= Gearóid O'Connell =

Irish hurler (born 1993)

Personal information
- Nickname: Gudgy
- Born: 26 March 1993 (age 33) Ballyea, County Clare, Ireland
- Occupation: Electrical engineer

Sport
- Sport: Hurling
- Position: Right wing-back
Clubs
- Years: Club
- Ballyea; Clondegad
Club titles
- Clare titles: 4
- Munster titles: 1
- All-Ireland Titles: 0
College
- Years: College
- Limerick Institute of Technology
Inter-county
- Years: County
- 2015-2017: Clare
Inter-county titles
- Munster titles: 0
- All-Irelands: 0
- NHL: 1
- All Stars: 0

Gearóid O'Connell (born 26 March 1993) is an Irish hurler. At club he plays with Ballyea, while he has also lined out at inter-county level with various Clare teams.

== Career ==
O'Connell first played hurling to a high standard as a student as St. Flannan's College in Ennis. He lined out for the college in all grades, including the Harty Cup.

At club level, O'Connell first played hurling at underage levels with Ballyea, while he also played Gaelic football with Clondegad. He was a dual medal-winner in the under-21 grades. At adult level, O'Connell has also won a Clare IFC medal and four Clare SHC medals. He was at centre-back when Ballyea were beaten by Cuala in the 2017 All-Ireland club final.

O'Connell first appeared on the inter-county scene with Clare at minor level. He was part of the team that won the Munster MHC title in 2011. O'Connell progressed to the under-21 team and was at right-wing-back when Clare beat Wexford to win a third consecutive All-Ireland U21HC title in 2014. He also spent a period of time with the senior team and was a panel member when Clare won the National League title in 2016.

== Honours ==
Ballyhea

- Munster Senior Club Hurling Championship: 2016
- Clare Senior Hurling Championship: 2016, 2018, 2021, 2022
- Clare Senior B Hurling Championship: 2013
- Clare Under-21 A Hurling Championship: 2012

Clondegad

- Clare Intermediate Football Championship: 2011
- Clare Under-21 A Football Championship: 2012

Clare

- National Hurling League: 2016
- All-Ireland Under-21 Hurling Championship: 2014
- Munster Under-21 Hurling Championship: 2014
- Munster Minor Hurling Championship: 2011
