= 2023 Clare Senior Hurling Championship =

Annual hurling competition season

Canon Hamilton Cup 2023
- League: Clare GAA
- Sport: Hurling
- Duration: 22 July - 22 October 2023
- Number of teams: 17
- Sponsor: TUS Midlands Midwest

Changes From 2022
- Promoted: St. Joseph's, Doora-Barefield
- Relegated: Smith O'Brien's, Killaloe; Whitegate

Changes For 2024
- Promoted: Corofin
- Relegated: Clarecastle; Wolfe Tones, Shannon

County Championship
- Winners: Clonlara (3rd Title)
- Runners-up: Crusheen

Senior B Championship
- Winners: -

The 2023 TUS Clare Senior Hurling Championship was the 128th staging of the Clare Senior Hurling Championship since its establishment by the Clare County Board in 1887.

The 2022 champions, and holders of the Canon Hamilton Cup are Ballyea, who successfully defended their 2021 crown, to win back-to-back titles and their fourth title in seven years. They defeated Éire Óg, Ennis by a single point in Cusack Park, Ennis in the county final.

The draws for the 2023 Clare club championships took place on 14 June 2023.

== Senior Championship Fixtures ==
=== Group stage ===
- One group of five and three groups of four.
- 2022 semi-finalists are seeded and kept separate.
- Each team plays all the other teams in their group once. Two points are awarded for a win and one for a draw.
  - The top two teams in each group advance to Quarter-Finals
  - The third-placed teams in each group and the fourth-placed team in Group A move to Senior B Championship
  - The bottom-placed team from each group contest Relegation Playoffs

==== Group A ====
Quarter-Final, Seeded Quarter-Final, Unseeded Senior B Championship Relegation Playoff

| Team | Pld | W | D | L | F | A | Diff | Pts |
|---|---|---|---|---|---|---|---|---|
| Scariff | 4 | 2 | 2 | 0 | 96 | 82 | +14 | 6 |
| Kilmaley | 4 | 2 | 1 | 1 | 90 | 83 | +7 | 5 |
| Ballyea | 4 | 2 | 1 | 1 | 82 | 82 | 0 | 5 |
| Inagh-Kilnamona | 4 | 2 | 0 | 2 | 106 | 87 | +19 | 4 |
| St. Joseph's, Doora-Barefield | 4 | 0 | 0 | 4 | 77 | 117 | -40 | 0 |

| 22 July 2023 Round 1 | Ballyea | 0-14 - 2-20 | Kilmaley | Cusack Park, Ennis |

| 22 July 2023 Round 1 | Doora-Barefield | 1-16 - 3-17 | Scariff | Dr Daly Park, Tulla |

| 29 July 2023 Round 2 | Ballyea | 1-16 - 0-15 | Inagh-Kilnamona | Shannon |

| 29 July 2023 Round 2 | Doora-Barefield | 2-11 - 0-24 | Kilmaley | Clarecastle |

| 11 August 2023 Round 3 | Inagh-Kilnamona | 0-23 - 4-18 | Scariff | Cusack Park, Ennis |

| 12 August 2023 Round 3 | Ballyea | 3-21 - 2-16 | Doora-Barefield | Clarecastle |

| 27 August 2023 Round 4 | Ballyea | 0-19 - 0-19 | Scariff | Dr Daly Park, Tulla |

| 27 August 2023 Round 4 | Inagh-Kilnamona | 3-22 - 1-16 | Kilmaley | Cusack Park, Ennis |

| 9 September 2023 Round 5 | Doora-Barefield | 1-16 - 4-25 | Inagh-Kilnamona | Cusack Park, Ennis |

| 9 September 2023 Round 5 | Kilmaley | 0-21 - 1-18 | Scariff | Cusack Park, Ennis |

==== Group B ====
Quarter-Final, Seeded Quarter-Final, Unseeded Senior B Championship Relegation Playoff

| Team | Pld | W | D | L | F | A | Diff | Pts |
|---|---|---|---|---|---|---|---|---|
| Clonlara | 3 | 3 | 0 | 0 | 67 | 52 | +15 | 4 |
| Crusheen | 3 | 1 | 0 | 2 | 58 | 62 | -4 | 2 |
| Sixmilebridge | 3 | 1 | 0 | 2 | 67 | 70 | -3 | 2 |
| O'Callaghan's Mills | 3 | 1 | 0 | 2 | 62 | 70 | -8 | 2 |

Crusheen finished above Sixmilebridge and O'Callaghan's Mills by virtue of an update to the GAA rule book as of 2023. In the case where point difference is used to determine placing, only the matches between the relevant teams are used to calculate the point difference.

Rule 6.21(5)(c)(i) of the GAA's official guide states:

The higher Scoring Difference (subtracting the total Scores Against from total Score For) in the ‘Head-to-Head’ games.

| 29 July 2023 Round 1 | Crusheen | 0-20 - 1-21 | Sixmilebridge | Clarecastle |

| 29 July 2023 Round 1 | Clonlara | 2-15 - 1-17 | O'Callaghan's Mills | O'Garney Park, Sixmilebridge |

| 12 August 2023 Round 2 | Clonlara | 0-24 - 1-16 | Sixmilebridge | Cusack Park, Ennis |

| 12 August 2023 Round 2 | Crusheen | 3-16 - 0-16 | O'Callaghan's Mills | Dr Daly Park, Tulla |

| 25 August 2023 Round 3 | Clonlara | 0-22 - 1-10 | Crusheen | Cusack Park, Ennis |

| 25 August 2023 Round 3 | O'Callaghan's Mills | 3-17 - 1-21 | Sixmilebridge | Clarecastle |

==== Group C ====
Quarter-Final, Seeded Quarter-Final, Unseeded Senior B Championship Relegation Playoff

| Team | Pld | W | D | L | F | A | Diff | Pts |
|---|---|---|---|---|---|---|---|---|
| Newmarket-on-Fergus | 3 | 3 | 0 | 0 | 72 | 52 | +20 | 6 |
| Clooney-Quin | 3 | 2 | 0 | 1 | 71 | 52 | +19 | 4 |
| Cratloe | 3 | 1 | 0 | 2 | 50 | 63 | -13 | 2 |
| Wolfe Tones, Shannon | 3 | 0 | 0 | 3 | 47 | 73 | -26 | 0 |

| 28 July 2023 Round 1 | Cratloe | 0-15 - 3-15 | Newmarket-on-Fergus | Cusack Park, Ennis |

| 29 July 2023 Round 1 | Clooney-Quin | 1-22 - 2-11 | Wolfe Tones, Shannon | Cusack Park, Ennis |

| 12 August 2023 Round 2 | Clooney-Quin | 0-19 - 2-16 | Newmarket-on-Fergus | O'Garney Park, Sixmilebridge |

| 12 August 2023 Round 2 | Cratloe | 1-19 - 1-09 | Wolfe Tones, Shannon | O'Garney Park, Sixmilebridge |

| 26 August 2023 Round 3 | Clooney-Quin | 5-12 - 0-13 | Cratloe | O'Garney Park, Sixmilebridge |

| 27 August 2023 Round 3 | Newmarket-on-Fergus | 3-17 - 0-18 | Wolfe Tones, Shannon | Clarecastle |

==== Group D ====
Quarter-Final, Seeded Quarter-Final, Unseeded Senior B Championship Relegation Playoff

| Team | Pld | W | D | L | F | A | Diff | Pts |
|---|---|---|---|---|---|---|---|---|
| Feakle | 3 | 3 | 0 | 0 | 61 | 47 | +14 | 6 |
| Éire Óg, Ennis | 3 | 2 | 0 | 1 | 64 | 54 | +10 | 4 |
| Broadford | 3 | 1 | 0 | 2 | 54 | 53 | +1 | 2 |
| Clarecastle | 3 | 0 | 0 | 3 | 48 | 73 | -25 | 0 |

| 29 July 2023 Round 1 | Broadford | 1-19 - 2-09 | Clarecastle | O'Garney Park, Sixmilebridge |

| 29 July 2023 Round 1 | Éire Óg, Ennis | 2-11 - 2-13 | Feakle | Fr Murphy Park, Newmarket-on-Fergus |

| 12 August 2023 Round 2 | Clarecastle | 0-17 - 1-21 | Feakle | Shannon |

| 13 August 2023 Round 2 | Broadford | 2-13 - 1-17 | Éire Óg, Ennis | Dr Daly Park, Tulla |

| 26 August 2023 Round 3 | Broadford | 1-10 - 1-15 | Feakle | O'Garney Park, Sixmilebridge |

| 26 August 2023 Round 3 | Clarecastle | 0-16 - 4-15 | Éire Óg, Ennis | Cusack Park, Ennis |

=== Quarter-finals ===
- Played by top two placed teams from each group

| 23 Sept. 2023 Quarter-Final | Clooney-Quin | 1-22 - 3-19 (AET) | Scariff | Cusack Park, Ennis |

| 23 Sept. 2023 Quarter-Final | Feakle | 1-18 - 2-13 | Kilmaley | Cusack Park, Ennis |

| 24 Sept. 2023 Quarter-Final | Clonlara | 1-14 - 0-14 | Éire Óg, Ennis | Cusack Park, Ennis |

| 24 Sept. 2023 Quarter-Final | Crusheen | 3-07 - 1-07 | Newmarket-on-Fergus | Cusack Park, Ennis |

=== Semi-finals ===
| 7 October 2023 Semi-Final | Crusheen | 1-24 - 0-19 | Scariff | Cusack Park, Ennis |

| 8 October 2023 Semi-Final | Clonlara | 0-23 - 0-15 | Feakle | Cusack Park, Ennis |

== County Final ==
| 22 October 2023 Final | Clonlara | 3-18 - 2-16 | Crusheen | Cusack Park, Ennis |
| 14:00 | Micheál O’Loughlin 2-9 (7fs), Colm Galvin 1-0, John Conlon, Ian Galvin 0-2 each, Colm O’Meara, Jathan McMahon, Diarmuid Stritch, Dylan McMahon, Aidan Moriarty 0-1 each. | Report | Oisin O’Donnell 1-4, Breffni Horner 1-3 (2fs), Ross Hayes 0-3 (3fs), Conor O’Donnell, Fergus Kennedy 0-2 each, Diarmuid Mullins, Jamie Fitzgibbon 0-1 each. | Attendance: 5,048; Referee: Niall Malone (Éire Óg) |

| Clonlara | Crusheen |

== Other Fixtures ==
=== Senior B Championship ===
- Played by four third-placed teams from Groups A-D, and the fourth-placed team from Group A

| 24 Sept. 2023 B Quarter-Final | Broadford | 1-12 - 1-16 | Inagh-Kilnamona | Dr Daly Park, Tulla |

| 4 October 2023 B Semi-Final | Ballyea | 3-23 - 1-22 | Sixmilebridge | O'Garney Park, Sixmilebridge |

| B Semi-Final | Cratloe | CONC - W/O | Inagh-Kilnamona |

| 23 October 2023 B Final | Ballyea | - | Inagh-Kilnamona | Gurteen |

=== Relegation Playoffs ===
- Played by the four bottom-placed teams from Groups A-D
  - Loser of each playoff relegated to Intermediate for 2024

| 23 Sept. 2023 Playoff 1A | Doora-Barefield | 2-16 - 1-13 | Wolfe Tones, Shannon | Fr Murphy Park, Newmarket-on-Fergus |

| 24 Sept. 2023 Playoff 1B | Clarecastle | 1-13 - 1-16 | O'Callaghan's Mills | O'Garney Park, Sixmilebridge |
