= Pearse Lillis =

Irish Gaelic footballer (born 1997)

Personal information
- Born: 16 June 1997 (age 29) Cooraclare, County Clare, Ireland
- Occupation: Secondary school teacher

Sport
- Sport: Gaelic football
- Position: Centre-back
Clubs
- Years: Club
- Cooraclare; Ballyea
Club titles
- Clare titles: 4
- Munster titles: 1
- All-Ireland Titles: 0
College
- Years: College
- University of Limerick
College titles
- Sigerson titles: 0
Inter-county
- Years: County
- 2016-present: Clare
Inter-county titles
- Munster titles: 0
- All-Irelands: 0
- NFL: 0
- All Stars: 0

Pearse Lillis (born 16 June 1997) is an Irish Gaelic footballer. At club level, he plays with Cooraclare, while he has also lined out at inter-county level with various Clare teams.

== Career ==
At club level, O'Connell first played Gaelic football at juvenile and underage levels with Cooraclare. He won a Clare U21AFC with the club in 2017. Lillis, however, has enjoyed his biggest club successes as a hurler with the Ballyea club and has won four Clare SHC medals. He was selected at left corner-forward when Ballyea were beaten by Cuala in the 2017 All-Ireland club final.

Lillis first appeared on the inter-county scene as a dual player with Clare at minor level in 2015. He later progressed to the under-21 team and concentrated solely on Gaelic football. Lillis was just 18-years-old when he made his senior team debut in 2016.

== Honours ==
Ballyhea

- Munster Senior Club Hurling Championship: 2016
- Clare Senior Hurling Championship: 2016, 2018, 2021, 2022

Cooraclare

- Clare Under-21 A Football Championship: 2017
