= Paul Flanagan =

Irish hurler (born 1992)

Personal information
- Native name: Pól Ó Flanagáin (Irish)
- Born: 16 September 1992 (age 34) Ballyea, County Clare, Ireland
- Occupation: Secondary school teacher
- Height: 5 ft 10 in (178 cm)

Sport
- Sport: Hurling
- Position: Right corner-back
Clubs
- Years: Club
- Ballyea; Clondegad
Club titles
- Clare titles: 4
- Munster titles: 1
- All-Ireland Titles: 0
College
- Years: College
- 2010-2014: University of Limerick
College titles
- Fitzgibbon titles: 0
Inter-county
- Years: County
- 2013-2024: Clare
Inter-county titles
- Munster titles: 0
- All-Irelands: 2
- NHL: 2
- All Stars: 0

Paul Flanagan (born 16 September 1992) is an Irish hurler. At club he plays with Ballyea, while he had also previously lined out at inter-county level with various Clare teams.

== Playing career ==
Flanagan first played hurling to a high standard as a student at St. Flannan's College in Ennis. He lined out for the college in all grades, including the Harty Cup. He later played with the University of Limerick in the Fitzgibbon Cup.

At club level, Flanagan first played hurling at underage levels with Ballyea, while he also played Gaelic football with Clondegad. He enjoyed success as a minor hurler, before later being a dual medal-winner in the under-21 grades. At adult level, Flanagan has also won a Clare IFC medal and four Clare SHC medals. He was at centre-back when Ballyea were beaten by Cuala in the 2017 All-Ireland club final.

Flanagan first appeared on the inter-county scene with Clare at minor level. He captained the team to a defeat by Kilkenny in the 2010 All-Ireland minor final. Flanagan progressed to the under-21 team and won back-to-back All-Ireland U21HC medals in 2012 and as team captain in 2013.

Flanagan was still eligible for the under-21 grade when he was also drafted onto the senior team. He was a non-used substitute when Clare beat Cork in a replay to win the All-Ireland SHC title in 2013. He was also a member of the team that won the National League title in 2016. Flanagan has remained a peripheral figure on the team, and only made his first championship start in 2022.

On 21 July 2024, he was an unused substitute as Clare won the All-Ireland for the first time in 11 years after an extra-time win against Cork by 3–29 to 1-34, claiming their fifth All-Ireland title.

On 27 September 2024, Flanagan announced his retirement from inter-county hurling.

== Coaching career ==
Flanagan has also become involved in team management and coaching as a teacher in Ardscoil Rís in Limerick. He was part of the management team that guided the school to Harty Cup titles in 2016 and 2018, before winning the All-Ireland Colleges SHC title in 2022.

== Honours ==
=== Player ===
Ballyea

- Munster Senior Club Hurling Championship: 2016
- Clare Senior Hurling Championship: 2016, 2018, 2021, 2022
- Clare Senior B Hurling Championship: 2013
- Clare Under-21 A Hurling Championship: 2012
- Clare Under-21 B Hurling Championship: 2011
- Clare Minor B Hurling Championship: 2009

Clondegad

- Clare Intermediate Football Championship: 2011
- Clare Under-21 A Football Championship: 2012

Clare

- All-Ireland Senior Hurling Championship: 2013, 2024
- National Hurling League: 2016, 2024
- All-Ireland Under-21 Hurling Championship: 2012, 2013 (c)
- Munster Under-21 Hurling Championship: 2012, 2013 (c)
- Munster Minor Hurling Championship: 2010 (c)

=== Management ===
Ardscoil Rís

- Dr Croke Cup: 2022
- Dr Harty Cup: 2016, 2018

Sporting positions
Preceded by Colin McGuane	Clare minor hurling team captain 2010	Succeeded by Tony Kelly
Preceded by Conor McGrath	Clare under-21 hurling team captain 2012	Succeeded by Tony Kelly
Achievements
Preceded by Conor McGrath	All-Ireland Under-21 Hurling Final winning captain 2013	Succeeded by Tony Kelly
