= 2017 Clare Senior Hurling Championship =

Annual hurling competition season

Canon Hamilton Cup 2017
- League: Clare GAA
- Sport: Hurling
- Duration: 13 May - 22 October 2017
- Number of teams: 16
- Sponsor: Pat O’Donnell & Co.

Changes From 2016
- Promoted: St. Joseph's, Doora-Barefield
- Relegated: Kilmaley

Changes For 2018
- Promoted: Kilmaley
- Relegated: Feakle

County Championship
- Winners: Sixmilebridge (13th Title)
- Runners-up: Clooney-Quin

Senior B Championship
- Winners: O'Callaghan's Mills

The 2017 Clare Senior Hurling Championship will be the 122nd staging of the Clare Senior Hurling Championship since its establishment by the Clare County Board in 1887.

The defending champions and holders of the Canon Hamilton Cup were Ballyea who won their first ever Senior title in October 2016.

== Senior Championship Fixtures/Results ==
=== First round ===
- Eight winners advance to Round 2A (winners)
- Eight losers move to Round 2B (Losers)

13 May 2017 Round 1	Newmarket-on-Fergus	1-16 - 1-13	Clooney-Quin	Cusack Park, Ennis
15:30

13 May 2017 Round 1	Clonlara	2-16 - 0-16	Feakle	O'Garney Park, Sixmilebridge
16:00

13 May 2017 Round 1	Inagh-Kilnamona	2-12 - 2-10	Crusheen	Cusack Park, Ennis
17:00

13 May 2017 Round 1	Sixmilebridge	3-25 - 1-11	Clarecastle	Cusack Park, Ennis
19:00

13 May 2017 Round 1	Cratloe	0-20 - 4-09	Whitegate	Tulla
19:00

14 May 2017 Round 1	Ballyea	1-16 - 0-12	Wolfe Tones, Shannon	Cusack Park, Ennis
12:00

14 May 2017 Round 1	Éire Óg, Ennis	3-18 - 0-16	O'Callaghan's Mills	Shannon
13:30

14 May 2017 Round 1	Tulla	3-13 - 1-22	St. Joseph's, Doora-Barefield	O'Garney Park, Sixmilebridge
16:00

=== Second round ===
==== A. Winners ====
- Played by eight winners of Round 1
  - Four winners advance to Quarter-finals
  - Four losers move to Round 3

12 August 2017 Round 2A	Newmarket-on-Fergus	1-18 - 0-14	St. Joseph's, Doora-Barefield	O'Garney Park, Sixmilebridge
16:00

12 August 2017 Round 2A	Ballyea	0-19 - 1-22	Sixmilebridge	Cusack Park, Ennis
19:00

13 August 2017 Round 2A	Éire Óg, Ennis	2-18 - 3-7	Whitegate	O'Garney Park, Sixmilebridge
13:30

13 August 2017 Round 2A	Clonlara	1-19 - 0-13	Inagh-Kilnamona	Cusack Park, Ennis
18:30

==== B. Losers ====
- Played by eight losers of Round 1
  - Four winners move to Round 3
  - Four losers move to Relegation Playoffs

12 August 2017 Round 2B	Feakle	2-14 - 2-22	Clooney-Quin	Shannon
14:00

12 August 2017 Round 2B	Clarecastle	0-12 - 1-13	Tulla	O'Garney Park, Sixmilebridge
16:00

12 August 2017 Round 2B	Cratloe	2-19 - 2-11	Crusheen	Cusack Park, Ennis
17:00

13 August 2017 Round 2B	O'Callaghan's Mills	2-20 - 0-24	Wolfe Tones, Shannon	Fr. Murphy Park, Newmarket-on-Fergus
13:45

=== Third round ===
- Played by four losers of Round 2A & four winners of Round 2B
  - Four winners advance to Quarter-finals
  - Four losers move to Senior B Championship

26 August 2017 Round 3	Cratloe	0-27 - 0-11	St. Joseph's, Doora-Barefield	O'Garney Park, Sixmilebridge
13:30

26 August 2017 Round 3	Ballyea	0-19 - 0-18	O'Callaghan's Mills	Fr.Murphy Park, Newmarket-on-Fergus
16:00

26 August 2017 Round 3	Inagh-Kilnamona	1-11 - 2-10	Tulla	O'Garney Park, Sixmilebridge
15:00

26 August 2017 Round 3	Clooney-Quin	0-17 - 0-11	Whitegate	Cusack Park, Ennis
16:00

=== Quarter-finals ===
- Played by four winners of Round 2A & four winners of Round 3

9 September 2017 Quarter-final	Éire Óg, Ennis	2-12 - 3-14	Clooney-Quin	Cusack Park, Ennis
14:45

9 September 2017 Quarter-final	Sixmilebridge	3-18 - 1-14	Cratloe	Cusack Park, Ennis
16:15		Report

9 September 2017 Quarter-final	Ballyea	1-12 - 1-16	Newmarket-on-Fergus	Cusack Park, Ennis
18:00		Report

10 September 2017 Quarter-final	Clonlara	1-17 - 1-09	Tulla	Cusack Park, Ennis
17:00

=== Semi-finals ===
23 September 2017 Semi-final	Clooney-Quin	0-16 - 0-14	Clonlara	Cusack Park, Ennis
17:30

24 September 2017 Semi-final	Sixmilebridge	3-17 - 2-18	Newmarket-on-Fergus	Cusack Park, Ennis
16:00

== County Final ==
15 October 2017; 3:30 pm Final	Sixmilebridge	0-19 - 1-16	Clooney-Quin	Cusack Park, Ennis; Attendance: 5,455; Referee: Ambrose Heagney (Corofin); Man of the Match: Keith Hogan
15 October 2017; 3:30 pm Final	Jamie Shanahan 0-9 (0-3f, 2 '65), Seadna Morey 0-3, Brian Corry and Alex Morey (0-2f) 0-2 each, Caimin Morey, Shane Golden, Niall Giliigan 0-1 each	Report	Peter Duggan 0-10 (0-8f, 1 '65), Ronan O’Donnell 1-1, Fergal Lynch 0-1, Ryan Taylor and Michael Corry 0-2 each, Fergal Lynch 0-1	Cusack Park, Ennis; Attendance: 5,455; Referee: Ambrose Heagney (Corofin); Man of the Match: Keith Hogan

22 October 2017; 3:30 pm Final (Replay)	Sixmilebridge	1-20 - 1-14	Clooney-Quin	Cusack Park, Ennis; Attendance: 5,892; Referee: Rory Hickey (Éire Óg); Man of the Match: Seadna Morey
22 October 2017; 3:30 pm Final (Replay)	Jamie Shanahan (0-3f) and Shane Golden 0-5 each, Brian Corry 1-1, Alan Mulready 0-3, Niall Gilligan 0-2, Aidan Quilligan, Conor Deasy, Cathal Malone, Cathal Lynch 0-1 each	Report	Peter Duggan 0-10 (0-6f, 2 '65, 1 sl), Michael Corry 1-1, Ryan Taylor, Fergal Lynch, Jimmy Corry 0-1 each	Cusack Park, Ennis; Attendance: 5,892; Referee: Rory Hickey (Éire Óg); Man of the Match: Seadna Morey

Sixmilebridge	Clooney-Quin

== Other Fixtures ==
=== Senior B Championship Fixtures/Results ===
==== Senior B Semi-finals ====
- Played by four losers of Round 3

8 September 2017 Senior B Semi-final	O'Callaghan's Mills	2-22 - 1-14	Whitegate	Broadford
16:00

9 September 2017 Senior B Semi-final	Inagh-Kilnamona	5-15 - 4-12	St. Joseph's, Doora-Barefield
				Attendance: Clarecastle

==== Senior B Final ====
23 September 2017 Senior B Final	Inagh-Kilnamona	1-15 - 3-16	O'Callaghan's Mills	Shannon
15:00

=== Relegation Play-Offs Fixtures ===
- Played by the four losers of Round 2B

==== Relegation Semi-finals ====
- Two winners remain in Senior Championship for 2018
- Two losers compete in Relegation Final

26 August 2017 Relegation Semi-final	Crusheen	1-23 - 0-11	Clarecastle	Gurteen
16:00

26 August 2017 Relegation Semi-final	Feakle	0-14 - 0-23	Wolfe Tones, Shannon	Tulla
18:00

==== Relegation Final ====
- Winner remains in Senior Championship for 2018
- Loser relegated to Intermediate for 2018

10 September 2017 Relegation Final	Feakle	0-11 - 1-21	Clarecastle	Tulla
12:00		Report
