= 2022 Clare Senior Hurling Championship =

Annual hurling competition season

Canon Hamilton Cup 2022
- League: Clare GAA
- Sport: Hurling
- Duration: 23 July - 23 October 2022
- Number of teams: 18
- Sponsor: Pat O’Donnell & Co.

Changes From 2021
- Promoted: Smith O'Briens, Killaloe
- Relegated: N/A

Changes For 2023
- Promoted: St. Joseph's, Doora-Barefield
- Relegated: Smith O'Brien's, Killaloe; Whitegate

County Championship
- Winners: Ballyea (4th Title)
- Runners-up: Éire Óg, Ennis

Senior B Championship
- Winners: Clonlara

The 2022 Clare Senior Hurling Championship was a competition in hurling that was the 127th staging of the Clare Senior Hurling Championship since its establishment by the Clare County Board in 1887.

The 2021 champions, and holders of the Canon Hamilton Cup are Ballyea who won their third title in six years, following on from their maiden success in 2016 and another in 2018. They defeated Inagh-Kilnamona by a single point in Cusack Park, Ennis in the county final.

The draws for the 2022 Clare club championships took place in April 2022.

== Senior Championship Fixtures ==
=== Group stage ===
- Two groups of five and two groups of four.
- 2021 semi-finalists are seeded and kept separate.
- Each team plays all the other teams in their group once. Two points are awarded for a win and one for a draw.
  - The top two teams in each group advance to Quarter-Finals
  - The third-placed teams in each group and the fourth-placed team in Groups A and B move to Senior B Championship
  - The bottom-placed team from each group contest Relegation Playoffs

==== Group A ====
Quarter-Final, Seeded Quarter-Final, Unseeded Senior B Championship Relegation Playoff

| Team | Pld | W | D | L | F | A | Diff | Pts |
|---|---|---|---|---|---|---|---|---|
| Sixmilebridge | 4 | 4 | 0 | 0 | 119 | 67 | +52 | 8 |
| Newmarket-on-Fergus | 4 | 2 | 1 | 1 | 75 | 67 | +8 | 5 |
| Feakle | 4 | 1 | 2 | 1 | 81 | 101 | -20 | 4 |
| Clonlara | 4 | 1 | 0 | 3 | 73 | 85 | -12 | 2 |
| Whitegate | 4 | 0 | 1 | 3 | 74 | 102 | -28 | 1 |

| 23 July 2022 Round 1 | Clonlara | 1-16 - 1-17 | Feakle | O'Garney Park, Sixmilebridge |

| 23 July 2022 Round 1 | Newmarket-on-Fergus | 1-13 - 0-23 | Sixmilebridge | Cusack Park, Ennis |

| 30 July 2022 Round 2 | Newmarket-on-Fergus | 0-18 - 0-09 | Whitegate | Dr Daly Park, Tulla |

| 31 July 2022 Round 2 | Feakle | 0-13 - 1-31 | Sixmilebridge | Cusack Park, Ennis |

| 13 August 2022 Round 3 | Clonlara | 1-20 - 0-19 | Whitegate | Cusack Park, Ennis |

| 14 August 2022 Round 3 | Feakle | 2-16 - 2-16 | Newmarket-on-Fergus | O'Garney Park, Sixmilebridge |

| 26 August 2022 Round 4 | Clonlara | 1-10 - 0-19 | Newmarket-on-Fergus | Cusack Park, Ennis |

| 28 August 2022 Round 4 | Sixmilebridge | 3-26 - 0-20 | Whitegate | Dr Daly Park, Tulla |

| 10 September 2022 Round 5 | Clonlara | 0-18 - 3-18 | Sixmilebridge | Shannon |

| 10 September 2022 Round 5 | Feakle | 1-23 - 1-23 | Whitegate | Dr Daly Park, Tulla |

==== Group B ====
Quarter-Final, Seeded Quarter-Final, Unseeded Senior B Championship Relegation Playoff

| Team | Pld | W | D | L | F | A | Diff | Pts |
|---|---|---|---|---|---|---|---|---|
| Cratloe | 4 | 3 | 0 | 1 | 109 | 76 | +33 | 6 |
| Ballyea | 4 | 3 | 0 | 1 | 86 | 74 | +12 | 6 |
| O'Callaghan's Mills | 4 | 2 | 1 | 1 | 85 | 87 | -2 | 5 |
| Broadford | 4 | 1 | 0 | 3 | 60 | 83 | -23 | 2 |
| Clarecastle | 4 | 0 | 1 | 3 | 58 | 78 | -20 | 1 |

| 23 July 2022 Round 1 | Ballyea | 2-20 - 1-14 | O'Callaghan's Mills | Cusack Park, Ennis |

| 23 July 2022 Round 1 | Clarecastle | 0-15 - 2-21 | Cratloe | O'Garney Park, Sixmilebridge |

| 30 July 2022 Round 2 | Ballyea | 1-22 - 0-13 | Broadford | Shannon |

| 31 July 2022 Round 2 | Clarecastle | 1-14 - 1-14 | O'Callaghan's Mills | Cusack Park, Ennis |

| 13 August 2022 Round 3 | Broadford | 0-16 - 2-23 | Cratloe | Cusack Park, Ennis |

| 14 August 2022 Round 3 | Ballyea | 0-21 - 1-14 | Clarecastle | Cusack Park, Ennis |

| 27 August 2022 Round 4 | Ballyea | 0-14 - 2-21 | Cratloe | Cusack Park, Ennis |

| 27 August 2022 Round 4 | Broadford | 0-18 - 3-11 | O'Callaghan's Mills | O'Garney Park, Sixmilebridge |

| 11 September 2022 Round 5 | Broadford | 0-13 - 0-09 | Clarecastle | Cusack Park, Ennis |

| 11 September 2022 Round 5 | Cratloe | 3-17 - 2-25 | O'Callaghan's Mills | O'Garney Park, Sixmilebridge |

==== Group C ====
Quarter-Final, Seeded Quarter-Final, Unseeded Senior B Championship Relegation Playoff

| Team | Pld | W | D | L | F | A | Diff | Pts |
|---|---|---|---|---|---|---|---|---|
| Clooney-Quin | 3 | 2 | 0 | 1 | 63 | 47 | +16 | 4 |
| Éire Óg, Ennis | 3 | 2 | 0 | 1 | 74 | 67 | +7 | 4 |
| Kilmaley | 3 | 2 | 0 | 1 | 63 | 70 | -7 | 4 |
| Scariff | 3 | 0 | 0 | 3 | 55 | 71 | -16 | 0 |

| 30 July 2022 Round 1 | Clooney-Quin | 1-16 - 0-13 | Scariff | O'Garney Park, Sixmilebridge |

| 30 July 2022 Round 1 | Éire Óg, Ennis | 3-15 - 3-18 | Kilmaley | Cusack Park, Ennis |

| 14 August 2022 Round 2 | Clooney-Quin | 0-26 - 1-09 | Kilmaley | Cusack Park, Ennis |

| 14 August 2022 Round 2 | Éire Óg, Ennis | 4-16 - 2-16 | Scariff | O'Garney Park, Sixmilebridge |

| 28 August 2022 Round 3 | Clooney-Quin | 1-15 - 0-22 | Éire Óg, Ennis | Cusack Park, Ennis |

| 28 August 2022 Round 3 | Kilmaley | 1-21 - 1-17 | Scariff | Dr Daly Park, Tulla |

==== Group D ====
Quarter-Final, Seeded Quarter-Final, Unseeded Senior B Championship Relegation Playoff

| Team | Pld | W | D | L | F | A | Diff | Pts |
|---|---|---|---|---|---|---|---|---|
| Inagh-Kilnamona | 3 | 2 | 0 | 1 | 62 | 54 | +8 | 4 |
| Wolfe Tones, Shannon | 3 | 2 | 0 | 1 | 63 | 57 | +6 | 4 |
| Crusheen | 3 | 1 | 0 | 2 | 61 | 56 | +5 | 2 |
| Smith O'Brien's, Killaloe | 3 | 1 | 0 | 2 | 49 | 68 | -19 | 2 |

| 30 July 2022 Round 1 | Crusheen | 1-12 - 1-18 | Inagh-Kilnamona | Cusack Park, Ennis |

| 30 July 2022 Round 1 | Smith O'Brien's, Killaloe | 1-12 - 2-17 | Wolfe Tones, Shannon | O'Garney Park, Sixmilebridge |

| 13 August 2022 Round 2 | Crusheen | 1-18 - 1-19 | Wolfe Tones, Shannon | Dr Daly Park, Tulla |

| 13 August 2022 Round 2 | Inagh-Kilnamona | 0-20 - 2-15 | Smith O'Brien's, Killaloe | Shannon |

| 28 August 2022 Round 3 | Crusheen | 2-19 - 0-13 | Smith O'Brien's, Killaloe | O'Garney Park, Sixmilebridge |

| 28 August 2022 Round 3 | Inagh-Kilnamona | 0-21 - 2-12 | Wolfe Tones, Shannon | Cusack Park, Ennis |

=== Quarter-finals ===
- Played by top two placed teams from each group

| 24 September 2022 Quarter-Final | Cratloe | 2-23 - 2-16 | Newmarket-on-Fergus | Cusack Park, Ennis |

| 24 September 2022 Quarter-Final | Sixmilebridge | 3-22 - 0-18 | Wolfe Tones, Shannon | Cusack Park, Ennis |

| 25 September 2022 Quarter-Final | Ballyea | 2-21 - 0-18 | Clooney-Quin | Cusack Park, Ennis |

| 25 September 2022 Quarter-Final | Éire Óg, Ennis | 2-21 - 0-16 | Inagh-Kilnamona | Cusack Park, Ennis |

=== Semi-finals ===
| 8 October 2022 Semi-Final | Ballyea | 0-24 - 1-17 | Cratloe | Cusack Park, Ennis |

| 9 October 2022 Semi-Final | Éire Óg, Ennis | 2-23 - 2-17 (AET) | Sixmilebridge | Cusack Park, Ennis |

== County Final ==
| 23 October 2022 Final | Ballyea | 2-14 - 1-16 | Éire Óg, Ennis | Cusack Park, Ennis |
| | Niall Deasy (1-06, 6f), Tony Kelly (0-04, 1’65), Aaron Griffin (1-01), Cathal O’Connor (0-02), Martin O’Leary (0-01). | Report | Danny Russell (0-11, 9f, 1’65), David Reidy (1-00), Darren O’Brien (0-02), Oran Cahill (0-01), Michael Moloney (0-01), Gavin Cooney (0-01) | Referee: Jarlath Donnellan (Wolfe Tones, Shannon) |

| Ballyea | Éire Óg, Ennis |

== Other Fixtures ==
=== Senior B Championship ===
- Played by four third-placed teams from Groups A-D, and the fourth-placed teams from Groups A and B

| 22 September 2022 B Quarter-Final | Clonlara | 1-25 - 3-13 | Crusheen | Clare GAA Centre of Excellence, Caherlohan |

| 25 September 2022 B Quarter-Final | Broadford | 2-23 - 0-14 | Kilmaley | Shannon |

| 7 October 2022 B Semi-Final | Feakle | 1-18 - 1-11 | O'Callaghan's Mills | O'Garney Park, Sixmilebridge |

| 9 October 2022 B Semi-Final | Broadford | 1-16 - 0-20 | Clonlara | Killaloe |

| 21 October 2022 B Final | Clonlara | 0-15 - 0-13 | Feakle | O'Garney Park, Sixmilebridge |

=== Relegation Playoffs ===
- Played by the four bottom-placed teams from Groups A-D
  - Loser of each playoff relegated to Intermediate for 2023

| 24 September 2022 Playoff 1A | Clarecastle | 0-28 - 1-21 | Whitegate | Dr Daly Park, Tulla |

| 25 September 2022 Playoff 1B | Scariff | 4-22 - 0-09 | Smith O'Brien's, Killaloe | Dr Daly Park, Tulla |
