= 2018–19 All-Ireland Senior Club Hurling Championship =

All-Ireland Senior Club Hurling Championship 2018–19
Championship Details
- Dates: 28 October 2018 – 17 March 2019
- Teams: 16

All Ireland Champions
- Winners: Ballyhale Shamrocks (7 win)
- Captain: Michael Fennelly
- Manager: Henry Shefflin

All Ireland Runners-up
- Runners-up: St Thomas'
- Captain: Conor Cooney
- Manager: Kevin Lally

Provincial Champions
- Munster: Ballygunner
- Leinster: Ballyhale Shamrocks
- Ulster: Ruairí Óg, Cushendall
- Connacht: Not Played

Championship Statistics
- Matches Played: 15
- Total Goals: 60 (4.00 per game)
- Total Points: 520 (34.67 per game)
- Top Scorer: Pauric Mahony (1–42)

The 2018–19 All-Ireland Senior Club Hurling Championship was the 49th staging of the All-Ireland Senior Club Hurling Championship, the Gaelic Athletic Association's premier inter-county club hurling tournament. The competition began on 28 October 2018 and ended on 17 March 2019.

The defending champion was Cuala of Dublin; however, Kilmacud Crokes eliminated that club in the 2018 Dublin SHC semi-final.

Ballyhale Shamrocks defeated St Thomas' by 2–28 to 2–11 in the final on 17 March 2019 to win the competition. This was the club's seventh title, as well as a first since 2015.

Pauric Mahony of Ballygunner was the competition's top scorer, finishing with 1–42.

== Format ==
County Championships

The top hurling teams in Ireland's counties compete in their senior club championship. Each county decides the format for determining their county champions – it can be knockout, double-elimination, league, etc or a combination.

Only single club teams are allowed to enter the All-Ireland Club championship. If a team which is an amalgamation of two or more clubs, a divisional team or a university team wins a county's championship, a single club team will represent that county in the provincial championship as determined by that county's championship rules. Normally it is the club team that exited the county championship at the highest stage.

Provincial Championships

Leinster, Munster and Ulster organise a provincial championship for their participating county champions. Connacht discontinued their senior club championship after 2007 but they do organise intermediate and junior championships. The Galway champions represent Connacht in the All-Ireland senior club semi-finals as Galway club hurling is at higher level than the hurling in the other four Connacht counties.

Some Leinster, Munster and Ulster counties also enter their senior champions in the All-Ireland intermediate club championship (tier 2) as it is recognised that club hurling is weak in those counties.

All matches are knock-out. Two ten minute periods of extra time are played each way if it's a draw at the end of normal time in all matches including the final. If the score is still level after extra time the match is replayed.

All-Ireland

The two semi-finals are usually played on a Saturday in early February. The All-Ireland Club SHC final is traditionally played at Croke Park on 17 March (St Patrick's Day).

All matches are knock-out. Two ten minute periods of extra time are played each way if it's a draw at the end of normal time in the semi-finals or final. If the score is still level after extra time the match is replayed.

Initial Schedule

County championships April 2018 to November 2018
Provincial championships October 2018 to December 2018
All-Ireland semi-finals early February 2019
All-Ireland final 17 March 2019

== County Finals ==
=== Connacht County Finals ===
Galway Senior Hurling Championships:

St Thomas' 2–13

Liam Mellows 0–10

=== Leinster County Finals ===
Carlow Senior Hurling Championships:

Mount Leinster Rangers 3–10

St Mullin's 1–13

Dublin Senior Hurling Championships:

Kilmacud Crokes 1–20 R 1–15

Ballyboden St Enda's 2–17 R 2–15

Kilkenny Senior Hurling Championships:

Ballyhale2–20

Bennettsbridge 2–17

Laois Senior Hurling Championships:

Rathdowney–Errill 0–19

Camross 2–15

Offaly Senior Hurling Championships:

Coolderry 2–17

Kilcormac–Killoughey 0–17

Westmeath Senior Hurling Championships:

Clonkill 1–13

Raharney 2-09

Wexford Senior Hurling Championships:

St Martin's 0–13

Naomh Éanna, Gorey 2–11

=== Munster County Finals ===
Cork Senior Hurling Championships:

As Imokilly are a divisional team, Midleton proceeded to the Munster Club Championship.

Imokilly 4–19

Midleton 1–18

Clare Senior Hurling Championships:

Ballyea 1–20

Cratloe 1–14

Limerick Senior Hurling Championships:

Na Piarsaigh 2–22

Doon 3–10

Tipperary Senior Hurling Championships:

Nenagh Éire Óg 2–13

Clonoulty–Rossmore 0–23

Waterford Senior Hurling Championships:

Ballygunner 2–19

Abbeyside 0–13

=== Ulster County Finals ===
Antrim Senior Hurling Championships:

Ruairí Óg, Cushendall

Loughgiel Shamrocks

Derry Senior Hurling Championships:

Slaughtneil 2–18

Banagher 0–14

Down Senior Hurling Championships:

Ballycran 2–13

Portaferry 1–14

== Team summaries ==
Team	County	Captain	Manager(s)	Most recent success		
Team	County	Captain	Manager(s)	All-Ireland	Provincial	County
Ballyboden St Enda's	Dublin	Simon Lambert	Joe Fortune			2013
Ballycran	Down	Michael Hughes	Gary Savage; Gary Gordon		1993	2015
Ballyea	Clare	Tony Kelly	Kevin Sheehan		2016	2016
Ballygunner	Waterford	Stephen O'Keeffe; Shane O'Sullivan	Fergal Hartley		2001	2017
Ballyhale Shamrocks	Kilkenny	Michael Fennelly	Henry Shefflin	2015	2014	2014
Camross	Laois	Niall Holmes	Danny Owens		1996	2017
Clonkill	Westmeath	Brendan Murtagh	Kevin O'Brien			2015
Clonoulty–Rossmore	Tipperary	John O'Keeffe	John Devane			1997
Coolderry	Offaly	Kevin Connolly	Joachim Kelly		2011	2015
Midleton	Cork	Luke O'Farrell	Paddy Fitzgerald	1988	1987	2013
Mount Leinster Rangers	Carlow	Gary Kelly	Brendan Fennelly		2013	2017
Na Piarsaigh	Limerick	William O'Donoghue	Paul Beary	2016	2017	2017
Naomh Éanna	Wexford	Brendan Travers	Louis Cullen			
Ruairí Óg	Antrim	Paddy Burke	Eamon Gillan		2015	2015
Slaughtneil	Derry		Michael McShane		2017	2017
St Thomas'	Galway	Conor Cooney	John Burke	2013		2016

== Leinster ==
=== Quarter-finals ===
4 November 2018 Quarter-final	Coolderry	1–22 – 1–16	Mount Leinster Rangers	O'Connor Park, Tullamore
1:30 pm	B Carroll 1–5 (3f), K Connolly 0–7, S Corcoran 0-5f, M Bergin 0–3, C Molloy 0–2.	Report	C Nolan 1–3, D Murphy (2f), D Byrne 0–3 each, E Byrne, J Murphy 0–2 each, J Nolan, M Malone, T Joyce 0–1 each.	Referee: J Keenan (Wicklow)

4 November 2018 Quarter-final	Camross	2–16 – 3–18	Naomh Éanna	O'Moore Park, Portlaoise
2:00 pm	Z Keenan 1–8 (1–7 frees, 0–1 ’65), O Bennett 1–1, N Holmes 0–3 (one free), C Collier 0–1, M Dowling 0–1, D Gilmartin 0–1, E Gaughan 0–1.	Report	P Doyle 0–9 (five frees, one ’65), D O’Brien 2–2, C McDonald 1–1, D Hughes 0–3 (two frees), C McGuckin 0–2, G Molloy 0–1.	Referee: S Cleere (Kilkenny)

6 November 2018 Quarter-final	Ballyboden St Enda's	2–25 – 2–19 (aet)	Clonkill	Parnell Park, Dublin
8:00 pm	P Ryan 0–15 (12f, 3 ’65), P Doherty 1–2, N Ryan 1–1, C Keaney, A Mellett 0–2 each, N McMorrow, J Roche, S O’Connor 0–1 each.	Report	B Murtagh 0–11 (7f), L Loughlin 1–2, E Price 0–4, N Mitchel 1–0, A Price, M Keegan 0–1 each.	Referee: D Hughes (Carlow)

=== Semi-finals ===
18 November 2018 Semi-final	Naomh Éanna	4–11 – 6–21	Ballyhale Shamrocks	Innovate Wexford Park, Wexford
	C Dunbar (2–3), P Doyle (0–6, 3fs, 1 '65), J Cullen (1–2), C McDonald (1–0 penalty).	Report	C Fennelly (4–4), TJ Reid (0–6, 1 '65, 1f), E Cody (1–1), E Reid (1–0), A Mullen (0–3), B Cody (0–2), E Shefflin (0–1), D Mullen (0–1), R Corcoran (0–1), R Reid (0–1), J Cuddihy (0–1).	Referee: J McGrath (Westmeath)

18 November 2018 Semi-final	Ballyboden St Enda's	5–28 – 5–25 (aet)	Coolderry	Parnell Park, Dublin
	P Ryan 0–14 (11f, 1 ‘65’), C Basquel 3–3, C Keaney 1–1, N Ryan 1–0, P Doherty 0–3, S Durkin, S O’Connor, D Curtin 0–2 each, A Mellett 0–1.	Report	B Carroll 2–16 (11f), D Parlon 1–1, C Molloy 1–0, S Corcoran (pen) 1–0, K Connolly 0–3, D Miller, C Parlon, M Bergin, W Malone, M Corcoran 0–1 each.	Referee: J Heffernan (Wexford)

=== Final ===
2 December 2018 Final	Ballyhale Shamrocks	2–21 – 0–11	Ballyboden St. Enda's	Dr Cullen Park
	TJ Reid 0–9 (0–8 frees), A Mullen 2–1, E Reid and E Cody 0–3 each, C Fennelly 0–2, E Shefflin, M Fennelly, R Corcoran 0–1 each.	Report	P Ryan 0–5 (all frees), C Basquel and N Ryan 0–2 each, S Durkin, N McMorrow 0–1 each.	Referee: Patrick Murphy (Carlow)

== Munster ==
=== Quarter-final ===
28 October 2018 Quarter-final	Ballygunner	1–18 – 2–13	Midleton	Walsh Park, Waterford
	Pauric Mahony 0–12 (11f, 0–1 '65), C Power 1–1, T O'Sullivan 0–2, B O'Keeffe, JJ Hutchinson, P Hogan 0–1 each	Report	C Lehane 1–4 (1-3f), C Beausang 1–2 (0–1 sideline), C Walsh 0–3, L Dineen, P White, L O'Farrell, J Nagle 0–1 each.	Referee: J Murphy (Limerick)

=== Semi-finals ===
4 November 2018 Semi-final	Na Piarsaigh	3–22 – 0–13	Clonoulty-Rossmore	Gaelic Grounds, Limerick
	P Casey (2–2); A Breen (0–6); S Dowling (0–5, frees); K Downes (1–1, 0–1 free); R Lynch (0–3, 1 free); C Grimes (0–2); D Dempsey, A Dempsey, C Boylan (0–1 each).	Report	T Hammersley (0–8, 5 frees); P White (0–2); C Bourke, C Hammersley, D Quirke (sideline) (0–1 each).	Referee: D Kirwan (Cork)

4 November 2018 Semi-final	Ballygunner	2–26 – 2–23 (aet)	Ballyea	Walsh Park, Waterford
	Pauric Mahony 0–14 (8fs), C Power 1–2, Philip Mahony 1–0, Brian O’Sullivan 0–3, Barry O’Sullivan 0–2, P Horgan, I Kenny, B O’Keeffe, C Sheehan and JJ Hutchinson 0–1 each.	Report	N Deasy 2–10 (5fs, 165), M O’Leary 0–4, T Kelly 0–3 (1 sideline), T Lynch, G Brennan, and P Lillis 0–2 each.	Referee: F Horgan (Tipperary)

=== Final ===
18 November 2018 Final	Na Piarsaigh	2–08 – 2–14	Ballygunner	Semple Stadium, Thurles
	S Dowling (1–4, 1–3 frees); K Downes (1–0); R Lynch (0–2); A Dempsey, A Breen (0–1 each).	Report	Pauric Mahony (1–6, 1–5 frees); S O’Keeffe (pen)(1–0), Brian O’Sullivan (0–3); Barry O’Sullivan (0–2); H Barnes, C Power, S O’Sullivan (0–1 each).	Referee: N Wall (Carrigaline)

== Ulster ==
=== Semi-final ===
28 October 2018 Semi-final	Ballycran	4–15 – 1–14	Slaughtneil	Corrigan Park, Belfast
2:30 pm	S Nicholson (0–7, 0–4 frees), J Coyle (2–0), C McManus (0–6 frees), N Breen (1–0), C Egan (1–0), C Woods (0–1), L Savage (0–1).	Report	C O’Doherty (0–7 frees), M McGrath (1–0), B Rogers (0–2), G Bradley (0–1), Se McGuigan (0–1), B Cassidy (0–1), M McGuigan (0–1), C McKaigue (0–1).	Referee: James Clarke (Cavan)

=== Final ===
11 November 2018 Final	Ruairí Óg, Cushendall	1–15 – 0–10	Ballycran	Athletic Grounds, Armagh
3:00 pm	N McManus (0–9, 7f, 1'65); S McAfee (1–0), D McNaughton (0–2), P Burke (0–1); S Delargy (0–1), E Campbell (0–1), F McCambridge (0–1).	Report	C McManus (0-3f), C Woods (0–3, 1f), S Nicholson (0–2), N Breen (0–1), J Coyle (0–1).	Referee: J Connors

== Semi-finals ==
The Leinster, Munster and Ulster champions qualify for the All-Ireland semi-finals. The Galway champions represent Connacht and enter the competition at the semi-final stage.

9 February 2019 Semi-final	Ruairí Óg, Cushendall	2–11 – 0–18	St Thomas'	Parnell Park, Dublin
3:00 pm	N McManus 1–6 (1-0pen, 0-4f, 0–2 65), F McCambridge 1–1, P McGill 0–2, S McAfee, E Campbell 0–1.	Report	Darragh Burke 0–6 (0-4f), E Burke 0–3, B Burke, J Regan 0–2, D Sherry, S Cooney (0-1f), C Cooney, K Burke, D McGlynn 0–1.	Referee: P O'Dwyer (Carlow)

9 February 2019 Semi-final	Ballygunner	0–13 – 1–15	Ballyhale Shamrocks	Semple Stadium, Thurles
5:00 pm	Pauric Mahony (0–10, 9f, 1 65), B O'Sullivan (0–2), P Hogan (0–1).	Report	E Cody (1–4), TJ Reid (0–4 3f), P Mullen (0–2); A Mullen (0–2), E Reid (0–2), E Shefflin (0–1).	Attendance: 3,944; Referee: C Lyons (Cork)

=== Final ===
17 March 2019 Final	St Thomas'	2–11 – 2–28	Ballyhale Shamrocks	Croke Park, Dublin
2:00 pm	Darragh Burke 0–7 (5f, 1’65’), C Cooney (pen), David Burke 1–0 each, B Burke, D McGlynn, J Regan, B Farrell 0–1 each.	Report	TJ Reid 0–9 (5f), C Fennelly 2–4, A Mullin 0–5, E Cody, B Cody, P Mullin 0–2 each, E Shefflin, R Reid, R Corcoran, M Aylward 0–1 each.	Attendance: 17,819; Referee: F Horgan (Tipperary)

== Statistics ==
=== Top scorers ===
Top scorer overall

Rank	Player	Club	Tally	Total	Matches	Average
1	Pauric Mahony	Ballygunner	1–42	45	4	11.25
2	Paul Ryan	Ballyboden St Enda's	0–34	34	3	11.33
3	Brian Carroll	Coolderry	3–21	30	2	15.00
4	Colin Fennelly	Ballyhale Shamrocks	6–10	28	4	7.00
4	T. J. Reid	Ballyhale Shamrocks	0–28	28	4	7.00
5	Neil McManus	Ruairí Óg	1–15	18	2	9.00
6	Adrian Mullen	Ballyhale Shamrocks	2–11	17	4	4.25
7	Niall Deasy	Ballyea	2–10	16	1	16.00
7	Eoin Cody	Ballyhale Shamrocks	2–10	16	4	4.00
8	Pádraig Doyle	Naomh Éanna	0–15	15	2	7.50

Top scorers in a single game

Rank	Player	Club	Score	Total	Opposition
1	Brian Carroll	Coolderry	2–16	22	Ballyboden St. Enda's
2	Colin Fennelly	Ballyhale Shamrocks	4-04	16	Naomh Éanna
2	Niall Deasy	Ballyea	2–10	16	Ballygunner
3	Paul Ryan	Ballyboden St Enda's	0–15	15	Clonkill
4	Pauric Mahony	Ballygunner	0–14	14	Ballyea
4	Paul Ryan	Ballyboden St Enda's	0–14	14	Coolderry
5	Colm Basquel	Ballyboden St Enda's	3-03	12	Coolderry
5	Pauric Mahony	Ballygunner	0–12	12	Midleton
6	Zane Keenan	Camross	1-08	11	Naomh Éanna
6	Brendan Murtagh	Clonkill	0–11	11	Ballyboden St Enda's

=== Miscellaneous ===
- Ruairí Óg, Cushendall became the most successful team in Ulster Club SFC history when winning an 11th title by defeating Ballycran in the final.
- Na Piarsaigh suffered a first ever defeat in the Munster Club SFC when losing to Ballygunner.
- Ballygunner won the Munster Club SFC title for the first time since 2001.

== Awards ==
Team of the Year

1. Stephen O'Keeffe
2. Eoghan Campbell
3. Joey Holden
4. Ian Kenny
5. Philip Mahony
6. Michael Fennelly
7. Fintan Burke
8. Shane O'Sullivan
9. Neil McManus
10. Adrian Mullen^{HOTY}
11. T. J. Reid
12. Pauric Mahony
13. Eoin Cody
14. Colin Fennelly
15. Brian Carroll

Hurler of the Year

- Adrian Mullen (Ballyhale Shamrocks)

Also nominated: PLAYER NAME (Club) & PLAYER NAME (Club)
