= Gary Brennan =

Irish Gaelic footballer

Personal information
- Native name: Gearóid Ó Braonáin (Irish)
- Occupation: Secondary school teacher

Sport
- Sport: Gaelic football
- Position: Midfield
Clubs
- Years: Club
- Clondegad (Football); Ballyea (Hurling)
Club titles
- Clare titles: 2
- Munster titles: 1
Inter-county
- Years: County
- 2007-2020: Clare

Gary Brennan is an Irish Gaelic footballer who played for the Clondegad club and at senior level for the Clare county team. He also plays club hurling for Ballyea.

== Playing career ==
=== Inter-county ===
On 31 July 2016, Brennan started in midfield as Clare were defeated by Kerry in the 2016 All-Ireland Quarter-finals at Croke Park. His performances throughout 2016 earned him an All-Star award nomination.

In January 2021, Brennan announced his retirement from inter-county football.

=== International ===
Brennan was included in the squad for the 2015 and 2017 International Rules Series. He scored 1-0-1 in the second test of the 2017 Series, including a first half goal.

=== Degrees ===
- Doctor of Philosophy (PhD) Royal Coll Surgeons in Ireland

=== Postgraduate Training ===
- George E. Hewitt Postdoctoral Research Fellow University of California-Irvine, United States1 Oct 2012 - 30 Sep 2015 Postdoctoral FellowshipSupervised by Baram TZ
- Marie Sklodowska-Curie Fellow Royal College of Surgeons in Ireland, Ireland1 Jul 2016 - 30 Jun 2018 Postdoctoral FellowshipSupervised by Henshall DC

== Other work ==
Brennan teaches P.E.E. and Irish at St Flannan's College in Ennis. He studied P.E.E. at the University of Limerick. Through his love of the Irish language he has accepted invitations to appear on TG4 Beo and Seó Spóirt.

== Honours ==
Ballyea

- Munster Senior Club Hurling Championship (1) : 2016
- Clare Senior Hurling Championship (2) : 2016, 2018

Clare

- McGrath Cup: (1) : 2019 (c)
- National Football League Division 3: (1) : 2016 (c)

Ireland

- International Rules Series: (1): 2015
