= John Conlon =

Irish hurler (born 1989)

John Conlon.
Personal information
- Native name: Seán Ó Conalláin (Irish)
- Born: 23 January 1989 (age 37) Limerick, Ireland
- Occupation: Primary school teacher
- Height: 1.88 m (6 ft 2 in)

Sport
- Sport: Hurling
- Position: Centre-back
Club
- Years: Club
- 2006–present: Clonlara
Club titles
- Clare titles: 2
College
- Years: College
- NUI Galway
College titles
- Fitzgibbon titles: 1
Inter-county*
Years	County	Apps (scores)
2009–present	Clare	66 (6–82)
Inter-county titles
- Munster titles: 0
- All-Irelands: 2
- NHL: 2
- All Stars: 2
- *Inter County team apps and scores correct as of 17:16, 06 November 2025.

John Conlon (born 23 January 1989) is an Irish hurler who plays for Clare Senior Championship club Clonlara. He usually lined out as a full-forward until 2020, when he became Clare's first choice for centre back.

== Playing career ==
=== St. Flannan's College ===
Conlon played in all grades of hurling with St. Flannan's College in Ennis before progressing onto the college's senior team. On 12 March 2006, he was introduced as a substitute when St. Flannan's College suffered a 2–08 to 0–12 defeat by Midleton CBS Secondary School in the Harty Cup final. On 1 May 2006, Conlon broke onto the starting fifteen when he was selected at full-forward for the All-Ireland final against Dublin Colleges. He scored a point from play in the 1–11 to 0–11 defeat.

On 11 March 2007, Conlon lined out at full-forward when St. Flannan's College faced De La Salle College from Waterford in the Harty Cup final. He top scored with 0-08 but ended the game on the losing side after a 2–07 to 0–11 defeat.

=== NUI Galway ===
As a student at NUI Galway, Conlon joined the university's senior hurling team and lined out in several Fitzgibbon Cup campaigns. On 6 March 2010, he lined out at right wing-forward when NUI Galway faced the Waterford Institute of Technology in the Fitzgibbon Cup final. Conlon scored the winning point in the 82nd minute and collected a winners' medal after the 1–1 to 1–16 extra-time victory.

=== Clonlara ===
Conlon joined the Clonlara club at a young age and played in all grades at juvenile and underage levels. He had already joined the club's senior team when he won a Clare Under-21 Championship medal in 2008.

On 28 October 2007, Conlon won a Clare Intermediate Championship medal following Clonlara's 1–21 to 1–18 defeat of Killanena in the final. On 25 November 2007, he scored 1–03 when Clonlara claimed the Munster Club Championship after a 1–14 to 1–08 defeat of Drom-Athlacca in the final.

On 26 October 2008, Conlon was selected at right wing-forward when Clonlara qualified for their first Clare Senior Championship final in 89 years. He scored two points from play and ended the game with a winners' medal after the 1–12 to 1–09 defeat of Newmarket-on-Fergus.

Conlon was again selected at right wing-forward when Clonlara qualified for a second successive final on 1 November 2009. He scored a point from play but ended the game on the losing side after the 3–05 to 1–09 defeat by first-time winners Cratloe.

On 11 October 2015, Conlon lined out at centre-back when Clonlara faced Sixmilebridge in the final. He ended the game on the losing side for the second time in his career after a 1–21 to 0–15 defeat.

On 16 October 2016, Conlon captained the team from right corner-forward when Clonlara faced Ballyea in the final. He scored a point from play in the 1–11 apiece draw. Conlon was switched to full-forward for the replay on 30 October 2016. He scored 1–01 from play but ended the game on the losing side after a 2–14 to 1–14 defeat.

=== Clare ===
==== Minor and under-21 ====
Conlon first played for Clare as a member of the minor team during the 2006 Munster Championship. He made his first appearance for the team on 5 April 2006 when he lined out at left wing-forward in a 2–13 to 1–08 defeat by Tipperary.

Conlon was eligible for the minor grade for a second successive season in 2007. He played his final game in the grade on 27 June 2007 when he scored a point from play in a 1–20 to 0–14 defeat by Cork.

On 20 July 2008, Conlon made his first appearance for the Clare under-21 team. He scored a two points in the 1–20 to 1–11 defeat of Cork. On 30 July 2008, Conlon lined out at right wing-forward when Clare faced Tipperary in the Munster final. He scored two points from play but ended the game on the losing side after a controversial 1–16 to 2–12 defeat by Tipperary.

Conlon was appointed captain of the Clare under-21 team in advance of the 2009 Munster Championship. On 29 July 2009, he captained the team from right wing-forward to a Munster final appearance against Waterford. Conlon ended the game with a Munster Championship medal after the 2–17 to 2–12 victory. On 13 September 2009, he again captained the team when Clare faced Kilkenny in the All-Ireland final. Conlon scored three points from play and collected a winners' medal after the 0–15 to 0–14 victory.

Conlon was eligible for the under-21 team for a third and final season in 2010. He played his last game for the team on 28 July 2010 when Clare suffered a 1–22 to 1–17 defeat by Tipperary in the Munster final.

==== Senior ====
Conlon was drafted onto the Clare senior team in advance of the 2009 National League. He made his first appearance for the team on 8 February 2009 when he was introduced as a substitute for Barry Nugent in a 3–13 to 1–18 first round defeat by Limerick. On 21 June 2009, Conlon made his Munster Championship debut when he was again introduced as a substitute in a 3–18 to 1–22 defeat by Tipperary.

On 7 April 2012, Conlon lined out at left corner-forward when Clare faced Limerick in the National League Division 1B final. He scored a point from play and claimed his first silverware at senior level after the 0–21 to 1–16 victory.

On 8 September 2013, Conlon was selected at right wing-forward when Clare qualified to play Cork in the All-Ireland final. He scored two points from play in the 0–25 to 3–16 draw. The replay on 28 September 2013 also saw Conlon scored two points from right wing-forward before collecting a winners' medal following the 5–16 to 3–16 victory.

Conlon was a regular starter during Clare's 2016 National League success, however, he missed the drawn final and the replay victory over Waterford after sustaining ankle ligament damage in the semi-final victory over Kilkenny.

On 9 July 2017, Conlon was selected at left wing-forward for his first Munster final appearance. He scored two points from play but ended the game on the losing side after Clare suffered a 1–25 to 1–20 defeat by Cork.

Conlon was selected at full-forward when Clare faced Cork in a second successive Munster final on 1 July 2018. He scored five points from play but ended on the losing side after a 2–24 to 3–19 defeat. Conlon ended the season by collecting his first GAA-GPA All-Star award.

Conlon was appointed captain of the Clare senior team for the 2020 season.

On 21 July 2024, he started in the half-back line as Clare won the All-Ireland for the first time in 11 years after an extra-time win against Cork by 3–29 to 1-34, claiming their fifth All-Ireland title.

== Career statistics ==
As of 27 June 2021.

Team	Year	National League			Munster		All-Ireland		Total	
Team	Year	Division	Apps	Score	Apps	Score	Apps	Score	Apps	Score
Clare	2009	Division 1	3	0-00	1	0-01	1	0-02	5	0-03
Clare	2010	Division 2	7	1–13	1	0-01	1	0-03	9	1–17
Clare	2011	Division 2	8	2–17	1	0-03	1	0-02	10	2–22
Clare	2012	Division 1B	6	2–11	1	1-02	2	0-06	9	3–19
Clare	2013	Division 1A	4	0-08	2	0-03	6	0-09	12	0–20
Clare	2014	Division 1A	6	1-08	1	1-02	2	1-05	9	3–15
Clare	2015	Division 1A	6	2–13	1	0-03	2	1-02	9	3–18
Clare	2016	Division 1B	6	3-07	1	0-01	3	0-03	10	3–11
Clare	2017	Division 1A	6	1-09	2	0-04	1	0-00	9	1–13
Clare	2018	Division 1A	6	0–15	5	1–19	3	0-08	14	1–42
Clare	2019	Division 1A	4	2-07	4	1-02	—		8	3-09
Clare	2020	Division 1B	4	0-05	0	0-00	0	0-00	4	0-05
Clare	2021	Division 1B	5	0-01	1	0-00	0	0-00	6	0-01
Total			71	14–114	21	4–41	22	2–40	114	20–195

== Honours ==
NUI Galway

- Fitzgibbon Cup (1) 2010

Clonlara

- Clare Senior Hurling Championship (2) 2008,2023
- Munster Intermediate Club Hurling Championship (1) 2007
- Clare Intermediate Hurling Championship (1) 2007

Clare

- All-Ireland Senior Hurling Championship (2): 2013, 2024
- National Hurling League Division 1 (2): 2016, 2024
- National Hurling League Division 1B (1): 2012
- All-Ireland Under-21 Hurling Championship (1): 2009
- Munster Under-21 Hurling Championship (1): 2009

Awards

- GAA GPA All Stars Awards (2): 2018, 2023

Sporting positions
Preceded by Patrick O'Connor	Clare Senior Hurling Captain; 2020	Succeeded by Incumbent
Achievements
Preceded by James Dowling	All-Ireland Under-21 Hurling Final winning captain 2009	Succeeded by Pádraic Maher
