= Niall Deasy =

Irish hurler

Personal information
- Native name: Niall Déiseach (Irish)
- Born: 1994 (age 31–32) Ballyea, County Clare, Ireland
- Occupation: AIB business adviser

Sport
- Sport: Hurling
- Position: Left wing-forward
Clubs
- Years: Club
- Ballyea; Parnells
Club titles
- Clare titles: 2
- Munster titles: 1
- All-Ireland Titles: 0
College
- Years: College
- 2011-2014: NUI Galway
College titles
- Fitzgibbon titles: 0
Inter-county*
Years	County	Apps (scores)
2016–present	Clare	1 (0-00)
Inter-county titles
- Munster titles: 0
- All-Irelands: 0
- NHL: 0
- All Stars: 0
- *Inter County team apps and scores correct as of 22:09, 6 December 2018.

Niall Deasy (born 1994) is an Irish hurler who plays as a left wing-forward for club side Ballyea and at inter-county level with the Clare senior hurling team.

== Playing career ==
=== Ballyea ===
Deasy joined the Ballyea club at a young age and played in all grades at juvenile and underage levels, enjoying championship success in the under-21 grade in 2012.

On 30 October 2016, Deasy scored 1-03 from right wing-forward when Ballyea defeated Clonlara by 2–14 to 1–14 to win the Clare Senior Championship for the first time ever. He retained his place at wing-forward for the subsequent Munster Championship, which culminated with him winning a provincial medal after a 1–21 to 2–10 defeat of Glen Rovers in the final. On 17 March 2017, Deasy scored 1-06 when Ballyea were defeated by Cuala in the All-Ireland final.

On 21 October 2018, Deasy won a second Clare Championship medal following Ballyea's 1–20 to 1–14 defeat of Cratloe in the final. He ended the championship as the top scorer with 2-48.

=== Clare ===
==== Minor and under-21 ====
Deasy first played for Clare at minor level in 2011. He was an unused substitute throughout the championship campaign, which culminated with the winning of a Munster Championship medal on 10 July 2011 after a 1–20 to 3–09 defeat of Waterford in the final.

Deasy subsequently joined the Clare under-21 hurling team and won a Munster Championship medal as a non-playing substitute on 30 July 2014 after a 1–28 to 1–13 defeat of Cork in the final. On 13 September 2014, Deasy was also an unused substitute in Clare's 2–20 to 3–11 defeat of Wexford in the All-Ireland final.

==== Senior ====
Deasy was added to the Clare senior hurling panel in late 2016. His involvement with the team during the National Hurling League was curtailed because of his involvement with the Ballyea club team and he was an unused substitute during the subsequent championship campaign.

Deasy made his first appearance for the Clare senior hurling team on 19 February 2017 in a 2–18 to 1–18 defeat by Kilkenny in the National Hurling League.

Later that season he made his first championship appearance, scoring 1-01 from play, in a 3–17 to 2–16 defeat by Clare in the Munster Championship. Later that season he made his first championship appearance, coming on as a substitute for David Reidy, in a 2–27 to 2–18 defeat of Waterford in the Munster Championship.

== Career statistics ==
As of match played 3 February 2019.

Team	Year	National League			Munster		All-Ireland		Total	
Team	Year	Division	Apps	Score	Apps	Score	Apps	Score	Apps	Score
Clare	2017	Division 1A	0	0-00	0	0-00	0	0-00	0	0-00
Clare	2018	Division 1A	5	0-02	1	0-00	0	0-00	6	0-02
Clare	2019	Division 1A	2	1-02	0	0-00	0	0-00	2	1-02
Total			7	1-04	1	0-00	0	0-00	8	1-04

== Honours ==
Ballyea

- Munster Senior Club Hurling Championship (1): 2016
- Clare Senior Hurling Championship (2): 2016, 2018

Clare

- All-Ireland Under-21 Hurling Championship (1): 2014
- Munster Under-21 Hurling Championship (1): 2014
- Munster Minor Hurling Championship (1): 2011
