= Ryan Taylor (hurler) =

Irish hurler (born 1995)

Personal information
- Born: 1995 (age 30–31) Ennis, County Clare, Ireland
- Occupation: Data analyst

Sport
- Sport: Hurling
- Position: Right corner-forward
Club
- Years: Club
- Clooney-Quin
Club titles
- Clare titles: 0
College
- Years: College
- 2014-2017: NUI Galway
College titles
- Fitzgibbon titles: 0
Inter-county
- Years: County
- 2015-present: Clare
Inter-county titles
- Munster titles: 0
- All-Irelands: 1
- NHL: 1
- All Stars: 0

Ryan Taylor (born 1995) is an Irish hurler. At club he plays with Clooney-Quin, while he has also lined out at inter-county level with various Clare teams.

== Career ==
Taylor first played hurling to a high standard as a student at St. Flannan's College in Ennis. He lined out for the college in all grades, including the Harty Cup. He later played with NUI Galway in the Fitzgibbon Cup.

At club level, Taylor first played hurling at underage levels with Clooney-Quin. He was part of the club's senior team that was beaten in a replay by Sixmilebridge in the 2017 SHC final.

Flanagan first appeared on the inter-county scene with Clare at minor level in 2013. He progressed to the under-21 team, with whom he spent two unsuccessful seasons. In spite of having earlier been a member of the extended training panel, it was only in November 2017 that Taylor earned a call-up to the senior team.

In 2023, Taylor suffered the "curse of the cruciate" also known as an injury to his ACL which would remove him from playing games for about nine months. He expects to return at the end of May 2024.

On 21 July 2024, he came on as a substitute as Clare won the All-Ireland for the first time in 11 years after an extra-time win against Cork by 3–29 to 1-34, claiming their fifth All-Ireland title.

== Honours ==
Clare

- All-Ireland Senior Hurling Championship: 2024
