= Jack Browne (hurler) =

Irish hurler

Jack Badger Browne
Personal information
- Native name: Seán de Brún (Irish)
- Born: 1993 (age 32–33) Ballyea, County Clare, Ireland
- Occupation: Teacher
- Height: 5 ft 11 in (180 cm)

Sport
- Sport: Hurling
- Position: Full forward
Club
- Years: Club
- Ballyea
Club titles
- Clare titles: 0
College
- Years: College
- University of Limerick
College titles
- Fitzgibbon titles: 1
Inter-county*
Years	County	Apps (scores)
2014-present	Clare	6 (0-00)
Inter-county titles
- Munster titles: 0
- All-Irelands: 0
- NHL: 1
- All Stars: 6
- *Inter County team apps and scores correct as of 18:08, 9 May 2016.

Jack Browne (born 1993) is an Irish hurler who plays as a right wing-back for the Clare senior team.

Born in Ballyea, County Clare, Browne was introduced to hurling in his youth. He developed his skills at St. Flannan's College while simultaneously enjoying championship successes at underage levels with the Ballyea club. Browne subsequently became a regular member of the Ballyea senior team. He has also enjoyed Fitzgibbon Cup success with the University of Limerick.

Browne made his debut on the inter-county scene at the age of seventeen when he first linked up with the Clare minor team. An All-Ireland runner-up in this grade, he later won two All-Ireland medals with the under-21 team. Browne made his senior debut during the 2014 league. Browne subsequently become a regular member of the starting fifteen and has won one National Hurling League medal.

== Career statistics ==
As of match played 8 May 2016.

Team	Year	National League			Munster		All-Ireland		Total	
Team	Year	Division	Apps	Score	Apps	Score	Apps	Score	Apps	Score
Clare	2014	Division 1A	2	0-00	1	0-00	2	0-00	5	0-00
Clare	2015	Division 1A	5	0-02	1	0-00	2	0-00	8	0-02
Clare	2016	Division 1B	3	0-02	0	0-00	0	0-00	3	0-02
Total			10	0-04	2	0-00	4	0-00	16	0-04

== Honours ==
=== Team ===
Ballyea

- Clare Senior B Hurling Championship (1) : 2013
- Clare Under-21 A Hurling Championship (1): 2012
- Clare Under-21 B Hurling Championship (1): 2011
- Clare Minor B Hurling Championship (1) : 2009

University of Limerick

- Fitzgibbon Cup (1) : 2015

Clare

- National Hurling League (1): 2016
- All-Ireland Under-21 Hurling Championship (3): 2012,2013, 2014
- Munster Under-21 Hurling Championship (3): 2012, 2013, 2014
- Munster Minor Hurling Championship (1): 2011
