= 2021 Clare Senior Hurling Championship =

Annual hurling competition season

Canon Hamilton Cup 2021
- League: Clare GAA
- Sport: Hurling
- Duration: 13 August - 14 November 2021
- Number of teams: 17
- Sponsor: Pat O’Donnell & Co.

Changes From 2020
- Promoted: Scarriff
- Relegated: N/A

Changes For 2022
- Promoted: Smith O'Briens, Killaloe
- Relegated: N/A

County Championship
- Winners: Ballyea (3rd Title)
- Runners-up: Inagh-Kilnamona

Senior B Championship
- Winners: Clonlara

The 2021 Clare Senior Hurling Championship was a competition in hurling that was the 126th staging of the Clare Senior Hurling Championship since its establishment by the Clare County Board in 1887.

With Sixmilebridge having won back-to-back titles in 2019 and 2020, they are looking to be the first Clare club team to win a three-in-a-row since Newmarket-on-Fergus in 1973. They defeated near-neighbours O'Callaghan's Mills in the 2020 final who were contesting their first final since 1993 which they ironically also lost to Sixmilebridge.

The 2021 Championship changed from the regular layout in adopting a group stage format. In 2020 a decision was made to not relegate any team from any championship in Clare due to the Coronavirus Pandemic.

== Senior Championship Fixtures ==
=== Group stage ===
- One group of five and three groups of four.
- 2020 semi-finalists are seeded and kept separate.
- Each team plays all the other teams in their group once. Two points are awarded for a win and one for a draw.
  - The top two teams in each group advance to Quarter-Finals
  - The third-placed teams in each group and the fourth-placed team in Group A move to Senior B Championship
  - The four bottom-placed teams in each group contest Relegation Playoffs

==== Group A ====
Quarter-Final, Seeded Quarter-Final, Unseeded Senior B Championship Relegation Playoff

| Team | Pld | W | D | L | F | A | Diff | Pts |
|---|---|---|---|---|---|---|---|---|
| Inagh-Kilnamona | 4 | 3 | 1 | 0 | 93 | 83 | +10 | 7 |
| Kilmaley | 4 | 2 | 1 | 1 | 89 | 80 | +9 | 5 |
| Clonlara | 4 | 2 | 1 | 1 | 93 | 92 | +1 | 5 |
| Whitegate | 4 | 1 | 1 | 2 | 92 | 101 | -9 | 3 |
| O'Callaghan's Mills | 4 | 0 | 0 | 4 | 80 | 91 | -11 | 0 |

| 14 August 2021 Round 1 | Inagh-Kilnamona | 0-23 0-21 | Kilmaley | Cusack Park, Ennis |

| 15 August 2021 Round 1 | Clonlara | 1-20 1-16 | O'Callaghan's Mills | Cusack Park, Ennis |

| 20 August 2021 Round 2 | Kilmaley | 1-24 2-12 | Whitegate | Cusack Park, Ennis |

| 22 August 2021 Round 2 | Inagh-Kilnamona | 0-23 1-16 | O'Callaghan's Mills | Cusack Park, Ennis |

| 5 September 2021 Round 3 | Clonlara | 2-15 1-22 | Inagh-Kilnamona | Cusack Park, Ennis |

| 5 September 2021 Round 3 | O'Callaghan's Mills | 2-18 2-19 | Whitegate | O'Garney Park, Sixmilebridge |

| 18 September 2021 Round 4 | Clonlara | 4-16 3-18 | Whitegate | O'Garney Park, Sixmilebridge |

| 18 September 2021 Round 4 | Kilmaley | 0-20 1-15 | O'Callaghan's Mills | Cusack Park, Ennis |

| 2 October 2021 Round 5 | Clonlara | 0-21 1-18 | Kilmaley | Cusack Park, Ennis |

| 2 October 2021 Round 5 | Inagh-Kilnamona | 0-22 0-22 | Whitegate | Cusack Park, Ennis |

==== Group B ====
Quarter-Final, Seeded Quarter-Final, Unseeded Senior B Championship Relegation Playoff

| Team | Pld | W | D | L | F | A | Diff | Pts |
|---|---|---|---|---|---|---|---|---|
| Sixmilebridge | 3 | 3 | 0 | 0 | 85 | 52 | +33 | 6 |
| Wolfe Tones, Shannon | 3 | 1 | 0 | 2 | 62 | 67 | -5 | 2 |
| Scariff | 3 | 1 | 0 | 2 | 60 | 71 | -11 | 2 |
| Clarecastle | 3 | 1 | 0 | 2 | 74 | 91 | -17 | 2 |

| 13 August 2021 Round 1 | Clarecastle | 2-13 3-26 | Sixmilebridge | Cusack Park, Ennis |

| 14 August 2021 Round 1 | Scariff | 1-08 2-16 | Wolfe Tones, Shannon | O'Garney Park, Sixmilebridge |

| 1 September 2021 Round 2 | Sixmilebridge | 3-19 0-13 | Wolfe Tones, Shannon | Shannon |

| 4 September 2021 Round 2 | Clarecastle | 2-21 2-23 | Scariff | Cusack Park, Ennis |

| 19 September 2021 Round 3 | Clarecastle | 2-22 2-21 | Wolfe Tones, Shannon | O'Garney Park, Sixmilebridge |

| 19 September 2021 Round 3 | Scariff | 1-17 2-16 | Sixmilebridge | Cusack Park, Ennis |

==== Group C ====
Quarter-Final, Seeded Quarter-Final, Unseeded Senior B Championship Relegation Playoff

| Team | Pld | W | D | L | F | A | Diff | Pts |
|---|---|---|---|---|---|---|---|---|
| Ballyea | 3 | 2 | 1 | 0 | 69 | 56 | +13 | 5 |
| Cratloe | 3 | 2 | 1 | 0 | 62 | 51 | +11 | 5 |
| Broadford | 3 | 0 | 1 | 2 | 43 | 48 | -5 | 1 |
| Crusheen | 3 | 0 | 1 | 2 | 42 | 61 | -19 | 1 |

| 14 August 2021 Round 1 | Cratloe | 3-16 1-15 | Crusheen | Cusack Park, Ennis |

| 15 August 2021 Round 1 | Ballyea | 1-19 2-15 | Broadford | Cusack Park, Ennis |

| 3 September 2021 Round 2 | Ballyea | 2-21 0-15 | Crusheen | Cusack Park, Ennis |

| 18 September 2021 Round 2 | Broadford | 1-10 1-14 | Cratloe | Shannon |

| 3 October 2021 Round 3 | Ballyea | 1-17 1-17 | Cratloe | Cusack Park, Ennis |

| 5 October 2021 Round 3 | Broadford | 0-09 0-09 | Crusheen | O'Garney Park, Sixmilebridge |

==== Group D ====
Quarter-Final, Seeded Quarter-Final, Unseeded Senior B Championship Relegation Playoff

| Team | Pld | W | D | L | F | A | Diff | Pts |
|---|---|---|---|---|---|---|---|---|
| Newmarket-on-Fergus | 3 | 2 | 0 | 1 | 59 | 53 | +6 | 4 |
| Éire Óg, Ennis | 3 | 2 | 0 | 1 | 68 | 60 | +8 | 4 |
| Feakle | 3 | 1 | 1 | 1 | 51 | 53 | -2 | 3 |
| Clooney-Quin | 3 | 0 | 1 | 2 | 57 | 69 | -12 | 1 |

| 14 August 2021 Round 1 | Éire Óg, Ennis | 0-19 0-22 | Newmarket-on-Fergus | O'Garney Park, Sixmilebridge |

| 15 August 2021 Round 1 | Clooney-Quin | 0-18 0-18 | Feakle | O'Garney Park, Sixmilebridge |

| 4 September 2021 Round 2 | Clooney-Quin | 3-10 1-24 | Éire Óg, Ennis | Cusack Park, Ennis |

| 5 September 2021 Round 2 | Feakle | 0-14 0-13 | Newmarket-on-Fergus | Cusack Park, Ennis |

| 18 September 2021 Round 3 | Clooney-Quin | 1-17 2-18 | Newmarket-on-Fergus | O'Garney Park, Sixmilebridge |

| 18 September 2021 Round 3 | Éire Óg, Ennis | 2-16 0-19 | Feakle | Shannon |

=== Quarter-finals ===
- Played by top two placed teams from Groups A-D

| 16 October 2021 Quarter-Final | Éire Óg, Ennis | 2-18 1-11 | Sixmilebridge | Cusack Park, Ennis |

| 16 October 2021 Quarter-Final | Newmarket-on-Fergus | 1-15 0-15 | Wolfe Tones, Shannon | Cusack Park, Ennis |

| 17 October 2021 Quarter-Final | Ballyea | 0-17 0-16 | Kilmaley | Cusack Park, Ennis |

| 17 October 2021 Quarter-Final | Cratloe | 0-21 1-22 | Inagh-Kilnamona | Cusack Park, Ennis |

=== Semi-finals ===
| 30 October 2021 Semi-Final | Éire Óg, Ennis | 0-17 1-17 | Inagh-Kilnamona | Cusack Park, Ennis |

| 31 October 2021 Semi-Final | Ballyea | 1-14 1-13 | Newmarket-on-Fergus | Cusack Park, Ennis |

== County Final ==
| 14 November 2021 Final | Ballyea | 1-17 1-16 | Inagh-Kilnamona | Cusack Park, Ennis |

| Ballyea | Inagh-Kilnamona |

== Other Fixtures ==
=== Senior B Championship ===
- Played by four third-placed teams from Groups A-D, and the fourth-placed team from Group A

| 16 October 2021 B Quarter-Final | Clonlara | 2-20 - 2-12 | Whitegate | O'Garney Park, Sixmilebridge |

| 16 October 2021 B Semi-Final | Broadford | 0-10 - 0-16 | Feakle | Shannon |

| 22 October 2021 B Semi-Final | Clonlara | 1-24 - 2-09 | Scariff | O'Garney Park, Sixmilebridge |

| 30 October 2021 B Final | Clonlara | 2-25 - 4-17 (AET) | Feakle | Broadford |

=== Relegation Playoffs ===
- Played by the four bottom-placed teams from Groups A-D
  - Top two teams remain in Senior Championship for 2022
  - Bottom two teams relegated to Intermediate for 2022

Remain in Senior Championship Relegated to Intermediate

| Team | Pld | W | D | L | F | A | Diff | Pts |
|---|---|---|---|---|---|---|---|---|
| Clooney-Quin | 3 | 2 | 0 | 1 | 59 | 50 | +9 | 4 |
| O'Callaghan's Mills | 3 | 2 | 0 | 1 | 57 | 52 | +5 | 4 |
| Crusheen | 3 | 2 | 0 | 1 | 57 | 61 | -4 | 4 |
| Clarecastle | 3 | 0 | 0 | 3 | 59 | 69 | -10 | 0 |

| 17 October 2021 Round 1 | Clarecastle | 0-22 0-25 | Clooney-Quin | Shannon |

| 17 October 2021 Round 1 | Crusheen | 1-19 - 1-17 | O'Callaghan's Mills | Clonlara |

| 25 October 2021 Round 2 | Clooney-Quin | 2-17 - 1-12 | Crusheen | Shannon |

| 30 October 2021 Round 2 | Clarecastle | 2-13 3-15 | O'Callaghan's Mills | Meelick |

| 6 November 2021 Round 3 | Clarecastle | 1-15 1-17 | Crusheen | Clonlara |

| 6 November 2021 Round 3 | Clooney-Quin | 1-08 0-13 | O'Callaghan's Mills | Meelick |
