= Seán Rynne =

Irish hurler

Personal information
- Native name: Seán Ó Rinn (Irish)
- Born: 2004 (age 21–22) Inagh, County Clare, Ireland
- Occupation: Student

Sport
- Sport: Hurling
- Position: midfield
Club
- Years: Club
- 2022-present: Inagh-Kilnamona
Club titles
- Clare titles: 0
College
- Years: College
- 2022-present: University of Limerick
College titles
- Fitzgibbon titles: 1
Inter-county
- Years: County
- 2023-present: Clare
Inter-county titles
- Munster titles: 0
- All-Irelands: 1
- NHL: 1
- All Stars: 0

Seán Rynne (born 2004) is an Irish hurler. At club level he plays with Inagh-Kilnamona and at inter-county level with the Clare senior hurling team. He usually lines out as a midfielder.

== Career ==
While a student at Ennistymon CBS, Rynne played both hurling and Gaelic football with the school, and was part of the senior teams in both codes when the school captured dual Munster PPS C grade honours in 2022, before losing both subsequent All-Ireland finals.

At club level, Rynne began his career in the juvenile and underage grades with Inagh-Kilnamona and won a Clare MAHC title in 2021. He has also lined out with University of Limerick in various inter-university competitions, including the Fitzgibbon Cup. He won an All-Ireland Freshers 1 Hurling League title in 2022.

Rynne first appeared on the inter-county scene with Clare as a member of the minor team that endured a 40-point defeat by Cork in 2021. He later spent three unsuccessful seasons with the under-20 team. Rynne was drafted onto the senior team in 2023. He claimed his first silverware as a member of the extended panel when Clare won the National Hurling League title in 2024.

== Honours ==
Ennistymon CBS

- Munster PPS Senior C Hurling Championship: 2022
- Munster PPS Senior C Football Championship: 2022

University of Limerick

- Fitzgibbon Cup: 2025
- All-Ireland Freshers 1 Hurling League: 2022

Inagh-Kilnamona

- Clare Minor A Hurling Championship: 2021

Clare

- National Hurling League: 2024
