= Thomas McInerney (disambiguation) =

Thomas McInerney (born 1937) is a retired US Air Force general.

Thomas McInerney may also refer to:

- Thomas McInerney (politician) (1854–1934), Australian politician
- Tom McInerney (1905–1998), Irish sportsman
- Thomas J. McInerney (executive), American CEO of Altaba Inc
- Thomas J. McInerney (politician) (1924–1998), American politician in the New York State Assembly
