= Conor Cooney (Clare hurler) =

Irish hurler (born 1987)

Personal information
- Native name: Conchúr Ó Cuana (Irish)
- Nickname: Rocky
- Born: 16 June 1987 (age 39) O'Callaghan's Mills, County Clare, Ireland
- Height: 5 ft 11 in (180 cm)

Sport
- Sport: Hurling
- Position: Corner-Back
Club
- Years: Club
- O'Callaghan's Mills
Club titles
- Clare titles: 0
Inter-county
- Years: County
- 2009-2015: Clare
Inter-county titles
- Munster titles: 0
- All-Irelands: 1
- NHL: 0
- All Stars: 0

Conor Cooney (born 16 June 1987) is an Irish hurler. At club level he plays with O'Callaghan's Mills, while he has also lined out at inter-county level with various Clare teams.

== Career ==
Cooney first played hurling at juvenile and underage levels with the O'Callaghan's Mills club. He subsequently progressed to adult level, but enjoyed little success during his career.

Cooney first appeared on the inter-county scene with Clare during a one-year tenure with the minor team in 2005. He was later drafted onto the under-21 team and captained the team to a controversial defeat by Tipperary in the 2008 Munster final. Cooney made the step up the senior team in 2009. He was an unused substitute when Clare won the All-Ireland SHC title after a defeat of Cork in 2013.

== Honours ==
Clare

- All-Ireland Senior Hurling Championship: 2013

Sporting positions
Preceded by	Clare under-21 hurling team captain 2008	Succeeded by Ciarán O'Doherty
