= 2019 All-Ireland Senior Club Hurling Championship final =

2019 All-Ireland Senior Club Hurling Championship Final
- Event: 2018-19 All-Ireland Senior Club Hurling Championship
St. Thomas'	Ballyhale Shamrocks
2-11	2-28
- Date: 17 March 2019
- Venue: Croke Park, Dublin
- Referee: Fergal Horgan (Tipperary)

The 2019 All-Ireland Senior Club Hurling Championship final was a hurling match which was played at Croke Park on 17 March 2019 to determine the winners of the 2018-19 All-Ireland Senior Club Hurling Championship, the 49th season of the All-Ireland Senior Club Hurling Championship, a tournament organised by the Gaelic Athletic Association for the champion clubs of the four provinces of Ireland. The final was contested by St. Thomas' of Galway and Ballyhale Shamrocks of Kilkenny, with Ballyhale Shamrockswinning by 2–28 to 2–11.

The All-Ireland final between Ballyhale Shamrocks and St. Thomas's was a unique occasion as it was the first ever championship meeting between the two teams. Ballyhale Shamrocks were hoping to win their seventh All-Ireland title, while St. Thomas's were bidding to win their second title after previously winning in 2013.

Ballyhale Shamrocks threatened to streak clear from the start. A nervous-looking St Thomas's hit a poor wide and overplayed a handpass when well placed while Shamrocks were far more clinical, moving three clear thanks to a point from Adrian Mullen either side of a free and first from play for T. J. Reid. The Kilkenny champions led 2–10 to 1-08 after an entertaining first period that saw Colin Fennelly raise two green flags, the second from an audacious piece of skill, but St Thomas's hit back with a penalty from Conor Cooney.

It was all one-way traffic after the break, however, as Thomas's only managed four scores – including a late consolation goal from Darragh Burke - and Ballyhale sent over a relentless stream of points. The sight of Conor Cooney going for goal from a 20m free with 15 minutes to play – it was blocked – was indicative of Thomas's already being resigned to their fate. Darragh Burke got Thomas's second goal, swiping a Shane Cooney delivery past Mason, six minutes into injury-time but even that only reduced the lead to 16 points.

== Match ==
=== Details ===
17 March 2019
14:00

St. Thomas	2-11 - 2-28	Ballyhale Shamrocks
Darragh Burke 0-7 (5f, 1’65’), C Cooney (pen), David Burke 1-0 each, B Burke, D McGlynn, J Regan, B Farrell 0-1 each.	Report	TJ Reid 0-9 (5f), C Fennelly 2-4, A Mullin 0-5, E Cody, B Cody, P Mullin 0-2 each, E Shefflin, R Reid, R Corcoran, M Aylward 0-1 each.

Croke Park, Dublin
Attendance: 17,819
Referee: F Horgan (Tipperary)

St. Thomas'	Ballyhale Shamrocks
