= 2018 Clare Senior Hurling Championship =

Annual hurling competition season

- Dates: 18 August 2018 – 21 October 2018
- Teams: 16
- Sponsor: Pat O'Donnell & Co.
- Champions: Ballyea (2nd title); Tony Kelly (captain); Kevin Sheehan (manager)
- Runners-up: Cratloe; Conor McGrath (captain); Alan Neville (manager)
- Promoted: Feakle
- Relegated: St. Joseph's, Doora-Barefield

Tournament statistics
- Matches played: 30
- Goals scored: 64 (2.13 per match)
- Points scored: 1007 (33.57 per match)

The 2018 Clare Senior Hurling Championship was the 123rd staging of the Clare Senior Hurling Championship since its establishment by the Clare County Board in 1887. The draw for the opening round fixtures took place in April 2018. The championship began on 18 August 2018 and ended on 21 October 2018.

Sixmilebridge were the defending champions, however, they were defeated by Cratloe at the quarter-final stage. St. Joseph's, Doora-Barefield were relegated from the championship.

On 21 October 2018, Ballyea won the championship following a 1–20 to 1–14 defeat of Cratloe in the final. This was their second championship title overall and their first title in two championship seasons.

Ballyea's Niall Deasy was the championship's top scorer with 2-48.

== Senior Championship Knockout Stages ==
=== Quarter-finals ===
22 September 2018 Quarter-Final	Clooney-Quin	0-14 - 0-17	O'Callaghan's Mills	Cusack Park, Ennis

22 September 2018 Quarter-Final	Cratloe	1-19 - 0-16	Sixmilebridge	Cusack Park, Ennis

23 September 2018 Quarter-Final	Ballyea	1-19 - 0-16	Inagh-Kilnamona	Cusack Park, Ennis

23 September 2018 Quarter-Final	Éire Óg, Ennis	1-08 - 1-21	Kilmaley	Cusack Park, Ennis

=== Semi-finals ===
6 October 2018 Semi-Final	Ballyea	1-21 - 1-17	O'Callaghan's Mills	Cusack Park, Ennis

7 October 2018 Semi-Final	Cratloe	1-14 - 0-16	Kilmaley	Cusack Park, Ennis
	R Considine 1-4; C McInerney, S Collins, C McGrath 0-2 each; P Collins, B Connors (’65), S Gleeson (f), D Collins 0-1 each.		M O’Malley 0-4; C Moloney (1f, 1’65), S O’Loughlin 0-3 each; M O’Neill, D Keane 0-2 each; T O’Rourke, E Bracken 0-1 each.

== County Final ==
21 October 2018 Final	Ballyea	1-20 - 1-14	Cratloe	Cusack Park, Ennis
	N Deasy 0-13 (0-12 frees, 0-1 ‘65), M O’Leary 1-3, T Kelly 0-2, B O'Connell 0-1, G Brennan 0-1.	Report	B Connors 0-8 (0-4f), C McInerney 1-3, R Considine 0-1, C McGrath 0-1, S Gleeson 0-1.	Attendance: 7,040; Referee: W King (Doora-Barefield)

Ballyea	Cratloe

== Championship statistics ==
=== Top scorers ===
Overall

Rank	Player	County	Tally	Points Total
1	Niall Deasy	Ballyea	2-48	54
2	Billy Connors	Cratloe	0-43	43
3	Peter Duggan	Clooney-Quin	1-36	39
4	Jacob Loughnane	O'Callaghan's Mills	0-37	37
5	Tony Kelly	Ballyea	3-33	42
