= Tom McInerney =

Irish hurler (1905–1998)

Personal information
- Native name: Tomás Mac an Airchinnigh (Irish)
- Born: O'Callaghan's Mills, County Clare
- Occupation: National school teacher

Sport
- Sport: Hurling
- Position: Midfield
Club
- Years: Club
- 1920s–1940s: O'Callaghan's Mills
Inter-county
- Years: County
- 1927–1936: Clare
Inter-county titles
- Munster titles: 1
- All-Irelands: 0
- NHL: 0

Tom McInerney (1905–1998) was an Irish sportsperson. He played hurling with his local club O'Callaghan's Mills. A defender, he played for the Clare senior inter-county team that reached the All-Ireland final in 1932.

== Playing career ==
=== Club ===
McInerney played club hurling with his local club O'Callaghan's Mills and enjoyed some success. He won a senior county title with the club in 1937. McInerney was the brother of Pa (Fowler) McInerney, also of O'Callahan's Mills, who won All-Ireland hurling championships with Clare and Dublin in the early 20th century.

=== Inter-county ===
McInerney first came to prominence for the Clare senior inter-county team in 1927 when Clare reached the Munster final. Cork opposed him on that occasion and went on to win the game by 5–3 to 3–4.

In 1928, Clare took on Cork for the second consecutive year in the Munster final. That year, McInerney's side nearly pulled off a shock result, however, both sides finished level after recording 2–2. The replay was not a happy game for Clare as Cork trounced them by 6–4 to 2–2.

Two years later, in 1930, McInerney was back in the provincial decider. Tipperary were the opponents on that occasion; however, Clare failed to make the breakthrough once again. A score line of 6–4 to 2–8 gave victory to Tipp.

In 1932, Clare reached the Munster final for the fourth time in six years. Once again, Cork, a team that had defeated McInerney's side on many occasions, provided the opposition. The game saw Clare triumph for the first time since 1914. A score line of 5–2 to 4–1 gave McInerney his first and only Munster medal. The subsequent All-Ireland semi-final ended with Clare emerging victorious over Galway by 9–4 to 4–14. This victory allowed Clare to advance to the All-Ireland final where Kilkenny provided the opposition. In a low-scoring but tense game, Clare's Tull Considine scored two goals and was foiled for what would almost certainly have been a third. These goals were negated by Kilkenny's three goal-scoring heroes Matty Power, Martin White and Lory Meagher. The final score of 3–3 to 2–3 gave victory to Kilkenny.

Clare went into decline following this game, as Limerick emerged as the dominant force in Munster. McInenrey retired from inter-county hurling in 1936.
