= Ballyea, County Clare =

Village in County Clare, Ireland

Ballyea Baile Uí Aodha
- Village
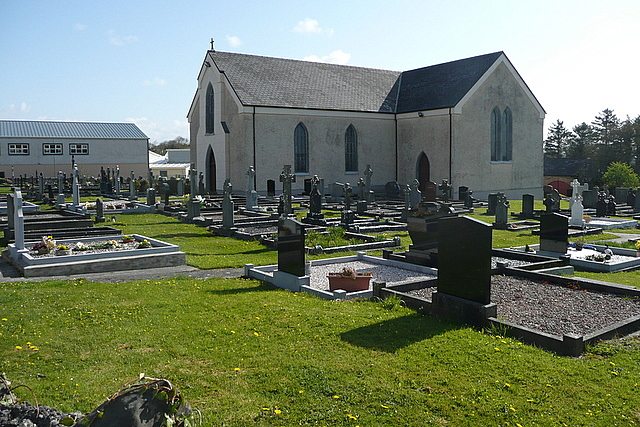
- Ballyea Catholic church

- Location in Ireland
- Coordinates: 52°47′02″N 9°01′48″W
- Country: Ireland
- Province: Munster
- County: County Clare
- Time zone: UTC+0 (WET)
  - Summer (DST): UTC-1 (IST (WEST))
- Irish Grid Reference: R305707

Ballyea (Irish: Baile Uí Aodha) is a small village in County Clare, Ireland, located southwest of Ennis.The village has a primary school, community centre, Catholic church and GAA facilities.

== Sports ==
Ballyea GAA is the local Gaelic Athletic Association club, and is mainly involved in hurling and camogie for girls. In the 2016 season, Ballyea won their first ever Clare Senior Hurling Championship and also went on to win the Munster Senior Club Hurling Championship.

== Notable people ==
- Tony Kelly - GAA-GPA Hurler of the Year in 2013, All Ireland Champion 2024
- Paul Flanagan - Ballyea GAA and Clare Hurling Teams, All Ireland Champion 2024
