= 2017 All-Ireland Senior Club Hurling Championship final =

2017 All-Ireland Senior Club Hurling Championship Final
- Event: 2016–17 All-Ireland Senior Club Hurling Championship
Ballyea	Cuala
1-10	2-19
- Date: 17 March 2017
- Venue: Croke Park, Dublin
- Man of the Match: Darragh O'Connell
- Referee: Fergal Horgan (Tipperary)
- Attendance: 30,930
- Weather: Showers

The 2017 All-Ireland Senior Club Hurling Championship final was a hurling match which was played at Croke Park on 17 March 2017 to determine the winners of the 2016–17 All-Ireland Senior Club Hurling Championship, the 47th edition of the All-Ireland Senior Club Hurling Championship, a tournament organised by the Gaelic Athletic Association for the champion clubs of the four provinces of Ireland. The final was contested by Cuala of Dublin and Ballyea of Clare, with Cuala winning by 2-19 to 1-10.

The All-Ireland final between Cuala and Ballyea was a unique occasion as it was the first-ever championship meeting between the two teams. Both teams were also appearing in their first All-Ireland final.

Ballyea struggled in the opening half as their star player, Tony Kelly, found it difficult to adjust to the pace of the game. His difficulties began after seven minutes when he hit the post with a point attempt and he blasted a wide soon after. Cuala positioned wing-back John Sheanon at midfield to mark Kelly and the ploy paid off with Kelly eventually slapping across the body of Seán Treacy in frustration for a 27th minute booking. Ballyea scored just two first-half points from play with free-taker Niall Deasy converting the other two and trailed by 1-07 to 0-04.

A clear turning point arrived two minutes into the second-half when Lillis was through on goal for Ballyea but released a weak shot that was saved when a goal seemed a certainty. A goal would have cut the gap to three at that stage and Cuala responded with three points themselves, from Treacy and Con O'Callaghan, to open up a commanding 1-10 to 0-04 lead. Ballyea's best period of the game came between the 37th and 51st minutes when they outscored Cuala by 1-06 to 0-04, including a 51st minute Deasy goal, to cut the gap to just four points. But Cuala's second goal from Malone in the 54th minute, after being released by Con O'Callaghan, set the seal on a famous win for the south Dubliners. Substitute Colum Sheanon glossed the scoreline with back to back injury-time points.

Cuala's All-Ireland victory was their first ever and a first for a Dublin club. They became the 26th club to win the All-Ireland title.

== Match ==
=== Details ===
17 March 2017
15:00

Ballyea	1-10 - 2-19	Cuala
N Deasy 1-6 (0-5f), P Lillis 0-2, J Murphy and G Brennan 0-1 each.	Report	D Treacy 0-9 (0-8f), C Cronin 1-1, D O’Connell 0-3, J Malone 1-0, C O’Callaghan 0-2, C Sheanon, J Sheanon and M Schutte 0-1 each.

Croke Park, Dublin
Attendance: 30,930
Referee: F Horgan (Tipperary)

Ballyea	Cuala
