= 2016 Clare Senior Hurling Championship =

Annual hurling competition season

Canon Hamilton Cup 2016
- League: Clare GAA
- Sport: Hurling
- Duration: 13 May - 30 October 2016
- Number of teams: 16
- Sponsor: Pat O’Donnell & Co.

Changes From 2015
- Promoted: Wolfe Tones, Shannon
- Relegated: Tubber

Changes For 2017
- Promoted: St. Joseph's, Doora-Barefield
- Relegated: Kilmaley

County Championship
- Winners: Ballyea (1st Title)
- Runners-up: Clonlara

Senior B Championship
- Winners: Clooney-Quin

The 2016 Clare Senior Hurling Championship was the 121st staging of the Clare Senior Hurling Championship since its establishment by the Clare County Board in 1887.

The defending champions and holders of the Canon Hamilton Cup were Sixmilebridge who won their second title in three years and to become county champions for a twelfth time.

== Senior Championship Fixtures/Results ==
=== First round ===
- Eight winners advance to Round 2A (winners)
- Eight losers move to Round 2B (Losers)

13 May 2016 Round 1	Clarecastle	0-19 - 0-17	Tulla	Cusack Park, Ennis

14 May 2016 Round 1	Clooney-Quin	4-13 - 1-19	Inagh-Kilnamona	Shannon

14 May 2016 Round 1	Cratloe	0-16 - 1-15	Feakle	Cusack Park, Ennis

14 May 2016 Round 1	Crusheen	1-14 - 0-16	Sixmilebridge	Cusack Park, Ennis

14 May 2016 Round 1	O'Callaghan's Mills	2-16 - 1-13	Whitegate	Scariff

15 May 2016 Round 1	Ballyea	1-23 - 3-26 (AET)	Éire Óg, Ennis	Cusack Park, Ennis

15 May 2016 Round 1	Clonlara	2-21 - 3-17	Kilmaley	Cusack Park, Ennis

15 May 2016 Round 1	Newmarket-on-Fergus	1-13 - 2-12	Wolfe Tones, Shannon	O'Garney Park, Sixmilebridge

=== Second round ===
==== A. Winners ====
- Played by eight winners of Round 1
  - Four winners advance to Quarter-finals
  - Four losers move to Round 3

20 August 2016 Round 2A	Clarecastle	1-17 - 1-19	Éire Óg, Ennis	Shannon

20 August 2016 Round 2A	Feakle	3-15 - 2-12	O'Callaghan's Mills	Scariff

21 August 2016 Round 2A	Clonlara	2-13 - 1-11	Clooney-Quin	O'Garney Park, Sixmilebridge

21 August 2016 Round 2A	Crusheen	1-12 - 0-12	Wolfe Tones, Shannon	Broadford

==== B. Losers ====
- Played by eight losers of Round 1
  - Four winners move to Round 3

20 August 2016 Round 2B	Ballyea	0-12 - 0-07	Newmarket-on-Fergus	O'Garney Park, Sixmilebridge

20 August 2016 Round 2B	Kilmaley	1-12 - 3-11	Sixmilebridge	Shannon

20 August 2016 Round 2B	Inagh-Kilnamona	1-12 - 2-12	Tulla	O'Garney Park, Sixmilebridge

21 August 2016 Round 2B	Cratloe	1-21 - 1-11	Whitegate	Tulla

=== Third round ===
- Played by four losers of Round 2A & four winners of Round 2B
  - Four winners advance to Quarter-finals

3 September 2016 Round 3	O'Callaghan's Mills	1-10 - 3-16	Tulla	Cusack Park, Ennis

4 September 2016 Round 3	Ballyea	0-18 - 3-08	Clooney-Quin	O'Garney Park, Sixmilebridge

4 September 2016 Round 3	Clarecastle	2-15 - 3-18	Cratloe	Cusack Park, Ennis

4 September 2016 Round 3	Sixmilebridge	0-18 - 2-13	Wolfe Tones, Shannon	Cusack Park, Ennis

=== Quarter-finals ===
- Played by four winners of Round 2A & four winners of Round 3

17 September 2016 Quarter-final	Ballyea	1-18 0-13	Crusheen	Cusack Park, Ennis

17 September 2016 Quarter-final	Clonlara	0-15 0-12	Tulla	Cusack Park, Ennis

18 September 2016 Quarter-final	Cratloe	0-18 1-12	Éire Óg, Ennis	Cusack Park, Ennis

18 September 2016 Quarter-final	Feakle	2-19 2-15	Wolfe Tones, Shannon	Cusack Park, Ennis

=== Semi-finals ===
1 October 2016 Semi-final	Ballyea	0-22 2-13	Feakle	Cusack Park, Ennis

2 October 2016 Semi-final	Clonlara	1-18 1-16	Cratloe	Cusack Park, Ennis

== County Final ==
16 October 2016 Final	Ballyea	1-11 1-11	Clonlara	Cusack Park, Ennis
14:00	Tony Kelly (0-9) 4 f’s, 1’65, Martin O’Leary (1-1), Cathal Doohan (0-1)		Colm Galvin (1-1), Cathal O’Connell (0-5) 3 f’s, John Conlon (0-2), Darch Honan (0-2), James Hastings (0-1)	Attendance: 5,035

30 October 2016 Final (Replay)	Ballyea	2-14 1-14	Clonlara	Cusack Park, Ennis
	Niall Deasy (1-3, 1 free); Gary Brennan (1-2); Tony Kelly (0-4, 1 free, 1 ’65); PJ Connolly, Joe Neylon, Jack Browne, Brian Carrigg, Damien Burke (0-1 each)		Cathal O’Connell (0-8, 7 frees); John Conlon (1-1); Colm Galvin (0-2); Nicky O’Connell (f), Darach Honan, Micheál O’Loughlin (0-1 each)	Referee: D Fox (Clooney-Quin)

Ballyea	Clonlara

== Championship statistics ==
=== Miscellaneous ===
- Ballyea win their first senior title.
