= Clonlara GAA =

Gaelic games club in County Clare, Ireland

- Cluain Lára
- Founded: 1897
- County: Clare
- Colours: Amber and black
- Grounds: Clonlara GAA Club
- Coordinates: 52°43′11″N 8°33′27″W

Playing kits
Regular Kit	Change Kit

Senior Club Championships
	All Ireland	Munster champions	Clare champions
Hurling:	-	-	3

Clonlara GAA is a Gaelic Athletic Association hurling club based in Clonlara, County Clare, Ireland. It is affiliated with Clare county board.

== History ==
The club was founded in 1897, making it one of the oldest clubs in County Clare.

In October 2023, they won their third Clare Senior Hurling Championship title after a 3–18 to 2–16 win against Crusheen in the final.

== Major honours ==
- Clare Senior Hurling Championship (3): 1919, 2008, 2023
- Clare Senior B Hurling Championship (3): 2020, 2021, 2022
- Munster Intermediate Club Hurling Championship (1): 2007
- Clare Intermediate Hurling Championship (5): 1928, 1975, 1989, 1999, 2007
- Clare Junior A Hurling Championship (4): 1973, 1999, 2015, 2019
- Clare Under-21 A Hurling Championship (1): 2008

== Notable hurlers ==
- Colm Honan
- Darach Honan
- Domhnall O'Donovan
- Colm Galvin
- John Conlon
- Nicky O'Connell

== Truagh Camogie Club ==
The Truagh Camogie Club, often called Truagh-Clonlara is the respective Camogie Club in the Parish. Several members of Clonlara GAA have been involved in the management team.

- Munster Senior Camogie Championship (1): 2024
- Munster Junior Camogie Championship (1): 2012
- Clare Senior Camogie Championship (3): 2023, 2024, 2026
