= 2016–17 All-Ireland Senior Club Hurling Championship =

All-Ireland Senior Club Hurling Championship 2016–17
Championship Details
- Dates: 2 October 2016 – 17 March 2017
- Teams: 18

All Ireland Champions
- Winners: Cuala (1st win)
- Captain: Oisín Gough
- Manager: Mattie Kenny

All Ireland Runners-up
- Runners-up: Ballyea
- Captain: Stan Lineen
- Manager: Robbie Hogan

Provincial Champions
- Munster: Ballyea
- Leinster: Cuala
- Ulster: Slaughtneil
- Connacht: Not Played

Championship Statistics
- Matches Played: 17
- Total Goals: 49 (2.88)
- Total Points: 514 (30.23 per game)
- Top Scorer: David Treacy (0–39)

The 2016–17 All-Ireland Senior Club Hurling Championship was the 47th staging of the All-Ireland Senior Club Hurling Championship since it began in the 1970–71 season. It is the Gaelic Athletic Association's premier inter-county club hurling tournament. The winning team received the Tommy Moore Cup. The competition began on 2 October 2016 and ended on 17 March 2017.

The defending champion was Na Piarsaigh. That club did not qualify from the group stage of the Limerick Senior Hurling Championship.

Cuala of Dublin defeated Ballyea by 2–19 to 1–10 in the final on 17 March to claim a first title. This was also a first title for a Dublin club.

Cuala's David Treacy was the competition's top scorer, finishing with 0–39.

== Format ==
County Championships

Ireland's counties play their county championships between their senior hurling clubs. Each county decides the format for determining their county champions. The format can be knockout, double-elimination, league, etc. or a combination.

Provincial Championships

Leinster, Munster and Ulster organise a provincial championship for their participating county champions. Connacht do not organise a provincial championship and are represented in the All-Ireland semi-finals by the Galway champions. All matches are knock-out and extra time is played if it's a draw at the end of normal time.

All-Ireland

The two semi-finals are usually played on a Saturday in early February. The All-Ireland Club SHC final is traditionally played at Croke Park on 17 March (St Patrick's Day). All matches are knock-out. If it's a draw at the end of normal time in the semi-finals, extra time is played. If the final ends in a draw the match is replayed.

Initial schedule

County championships April 2016 to November 2016
Provincial championships October 2016 to December 2016
All-Ireland semi-finals early February 2017
All-Ireland final 17 March 2017

== Leinster ==
=== Quarter-finals ===
6 November 2016 Quarter-final	Oulart–The Ballagh	2–13 – 0–9	St Rynagh's	Wexford Park, Wexford
	Rory Jacob (0–6, 0–4 frees), Murtha Doyle (1–0), Martin Óg Storey (1–0), Des Mythen (0–2), Paul Roche (0–1), Garrett Sinnott (0–1), David Redmond (0–1), Tommy Storey (0–1), Peter Murphy (0–1).	Report	Aidan Treacy (0–3 frees), Matthew Maloney (0–3, 0–1 free), Joseph O’Connor(0–2), Niall Wynne (0–1).	Referee: J Keenan (Wicklow)

6 November 2016 Quarter-final	Raharney	1–11 – 2–14	St Mullin's	Cusack Park, Mullingar
	Killian Doyle (0-05, 0-04f), Robbie Greville (1-00), Cormac Boyle (0-02); Joey Boyle (0-01); James Goonery (0-01), John Shaw (0-01), Ciaran Doyle (0-01).	Report	Marty Kavanagh (1–10, 0-07f), James Doyle (1-02), Seamus Murphy (0-01), John (Minor) Murphy (0-01).	Referee: S Cleere (Kilkenny)

6 November 2016 Quarter-final	Cuala	4–16 – 1–14	Borris-in-Ossory–Kilcotton	Parnell Park, Dublin
	Con O’Callaghan 4–3, David Treacy 0–6 (0-5f), Cian Waldron 0–4, Colm Cronin, John Sheanon and Darragh O’Connell 0–1 each.	Report	PJ Scully 0–6 (0-5f, 1 sideline), Patrick Whelan 1–2, Aaron Dunphy and Danny Fitzpatrick 0–2 each, Neil Foyle and Joseph Campion 0–1 each.	Referee: P O'Dwyer (Carlow)

=== Semi-finals ===
20 November 2016 Semi-final	Oulart–The Ballagh	0–17 – 3–17	O'Loughlin Gaels	Innovate Wexford Park, Wexford
	Garrett Sinnott (0–5); Nicky Kirwan (0–4, 3 frees); Des Mythen, David Redmond (0–2 each); Rory Jacob, Peter Murphy, Billy Dunne, Murtha Doyle (0–1 each).	Report	Mark Bergin (1–8, 0–4 frees); Mark Kelly (1–1); Martin Comerford (0–4); Sammy Johnston (1–0); Paddy Deegan (0–2); Huw Lawlor, Danny Loughnane (0–1 each).	Referee: A Devine (Westmeath)

20 November 2016 Semi-final	Cuala	1–19 – 1–7	St Mullin's	Cusack Park, Mullingar
	Con O'Callaghan (1-03), David Treacy (0-07, 0-05f); Sean Treacy (0-03), Mark Schutte (0-02), Colum Sheanon (0-01), Colm Cronin (0-01), Jake Malone (0-01), Darragh O'Connell (0-01).	Report	John Murphy (1–0); James Doyle (0-03, 0-01f), Jack Kavanagh (0-02), Marty Kavanagh (0-02, 0-01f).	Referee: P Burke (Kilkenny)

=== Final ===
4 December 2016 Final	Cuala	3–19 – 1–16	O'Loughlin Gaels	O'Moore Park, Portlaoise
	David Treacy 0–11 (0–1 sideline, 0–9 frees), Con O’Callaghan 1–4, Colm Cronin 1–0, Mark Schutte 1–1, Darragh O’Connell 0–2 (0–1 free), Cian Waldron 0–1.	Report	Mark Bergin 0–11 (0–10 frees), Danny Loughnane 1–0, Martin Comerford 0–2, Alan Geoghegan 0–1, Stephen Murphy 0–1 (free), Mark Kelly 0–1 each.	Attendance: 3,000; Referee: M Murtagh (Westmeath); Man of the Match: Con O'Callaghan

== Munster ==
=== Quarter-final ===
30 October 2016 Quarter-final	Thurles Sarsfields	0–17 – 0–16	Ballygunner	Semple Stadium, Thurles
	Pa Bourke 0–7 (3fs, 1 65’), Stephen Cahill 0–4, Ronan Maher 0–2, Stephen Lillis, Denis Maher, Aidan McCormack, Lar Corbett 0–1 each.	Report	Pauric Mahony 0–8 (8fs), David O'Sullivan 0–3, Peter Hogan 0–2, Harley Barnes, Shane O'Sullivan, Brian O'Sullivan 0–1 each.	Referee: J Murphy (Limerick)

=== Semi-finals ===
6 November 2016 Semi-final	Patrickswell	0–14 – 0–15	Glen Rovers	Gaelic Grounds, Limerick
	Aaron Gillane 0–6 (4f), Diarmaid Byrnes 0–3 (2 65s, 1f), Thomas O’Brien 0–2, Cian Lynch, Jack Kelleher & Kevin O’Brien 0–1 each.	Report	Patrick Horgan 0–8 (6f), Dean Brosnan, Conor Dorris & David Busteed 0–2 each, Donal Cronin 0–1.	Referee: R McGann (Clare)

6 November 2016 Semi-final	Ballyea	4–18 – 2–22 (aet)	Thurles Sarsfields	Cusack Park, Ennis
	Tony Kelly 1–10 (1–0 Pen, 3f, 1’65); Niall Deasy 0–5 (3f, 1’65); Pearse Lillis, Damien Burke 1–1 each; Gary Brennan 1–0;; PJ Connolly 0–1.	Report	Pa Bourke 0–9 (6f); Aidan McCormack 1–4; Tommy Doyle 0–3; Padraic Maher 1–0; Conor Lanigan 0–2; Ronan Maher, John Maher, Michael O’Brien, Stephen Cahill 0–1 each.	Referee: D Kirwan (Cork)

=== Final ===
20 November 2016 Final	Ballyea	1–21 – 2–10	Glen Rovers	Semple Stadium, Thurles
	Niall Deasy 0–7 (3f), Tony Kelly 0–5, Pearse Lillis 1–1, Gearoid O'Connell 0–3, PJ Connolly & Damien Burke 0–2 each, Gary Brennan 0–1.	Report	Conor Dorris 2–1, Patrick Horgan 0–5 (4f, 1 65), Mark Dooley 0–2, David Cunningham & Cathal O’Brien 0–1 each.	Referee: J Murphy (Limerick)

== Ulster ==
=== Quarter-final ===
2 October 2016 Quarter-final	Middletown	2–16 – 0–10	Lisbellaw	St Oliver Plunkett Park, Crossmaglen

=== Semi-finals ===
9 October 2016 Semi-final	Slaughtneil	3–16 – 1–12	Middletown	Páirc Esler, Newry
2:30 pm	Gerald Bradley and Cormac McKenna 1–1 each, Oisin O'Doherty 1–0 pen, Cormac O'Doherty 0–8 (0-5f), Brendan Rogers 0–3, Sé McGuigan 0–2 (0-1f), Mark McGuigan 0–1	Report ?	Nathan Curry (0-4f) and Dean Gaffney (0-3f) 0–4 each, Shaun Toal 1–0, Cathal Carvill 0–2, Paddy McBride and Ryan Gaffney 0–1 each.	Referee: C Cunning (Antrim)

9 October 2016 Semi-final	Loughgiel Shamrocks	1–25 – 0–9	Ballygalget	Watty Graham Park, Maghera
2:30 pm	M Connolly 0–11 (7f, 3 '65), B McCarry 1–3, L Watson 0–4, E McCloskey, M McFadden 0–2 each, D McMullan, D McKinley, B McAuley 0–1 each.	Report	C Coulter 0-4f, C Bailie, G Johnson (1f) 0–2 each, G Roddy 0–1.	Referee: É Hassan (Derry)

=== Final ===
23 October 2016 Final	Loughgiel Shamrocks	1–13 – 2–14	Slaughtneil	Athletic Grounds, Armagh
	Maol Connolly 0-5f, Joey Scullion 1–0, Mark McFadden and Barney McAuley 0–2 (0-f, 1 '65), Eddie McCloskey, Donal McKinley, Brendan McCarry, Liam Watson 0–1 each.	Report ?	Cormac O'Doherty 1–8 (0-7f), Brendan Rodgers 1–1, Chrissy McKaigue 0–3, Sé McGuigan 0–2.	Attendance: 5,635; Referee: James Clarke (Cavan); Man of the Match: Chrissy McKaigue

== Semi-finals ==
4 February 2017; 17:00; Semi-final	St Thomas'	2–14 – 1–19	Ballyea	Semple Stadium, Thurles; Referee: S Cleere (Kilkenny); Man of the Match: Niall Deasy
4 February 2017; 17:00; Semi-final	Darragh Burke 0–8 (0-6f, 0–1 ’65), Conor Cooney (1-0f), Anthony Kelly 1–0 each, Kenneth Burke 0–2, Shane Cooney, James Regan, Donal Cooney, Éanna Burke 0–1 each.	Report	Niall Deasy 1–11 (0-9f), Tony Kelly 0–3, Gearoid O’Connell, PJ Connolly 0–2 each, Cathal Doohan 0–1.	Semple Stadium, Thurles; Referee: S Cleere (Kilkenny); Man of the Match: Niall Deasy

25 February 2017; 15:00; Semi-final	Slaughtneil	2–11 – 3–21	Cuala	Athletic Grounds, Armagh; Referee: C Lyons (Cork); Man of the Match: Sean Moran
25 February 2017; 15:00; Semi-final	Gerald Bradley 1–2 (1f), Sé McGuigan 1–0, Chrissy McKaigue 0–2, Brendan Rodgers 0–2, Cormac O’Doherty 0–5 (2f, one ’65′).	Report	David Treacy 0–8 (7f), Con O’Callaghan 1–3, Sean Treacy 1–1, Niall Carty 1–0, Colm Cronin 0–3, Mark Schutte 0–1, Jake Malone 0–1, Colum Sheanan 0–1, Sean Moran 0–1.	Athletic Grounds, Armagh; Referee: C Lyons (Cork); Man of the Match: Sean Moran

== Final ==
17 March 2017; 15:00; Final	Ballyea	1–10 – 2–19	Cuala	Croke Park, Dublin; Referee: Fergal Horgan (Tipperary); Man of the Match: Darragh O'Connell
17 March 2017; 15:00; Final	Niall Deasy (1–6, 6f), Pearse Lillis (0–2), Gary Brennan (0–1), James Murphy (0–1).	Report	David Treacy (0–9, 8f), Colm Cronin (1–1), Jake Malone (1–0), Darragh O'Connell (0–3), Con O'Callaghan (0–2), Colum Sheanon (0–2), John Sheanon (0–1), Mark Schutte (0–1).	Croke Park, Dublin; Referee: Fergal Horgan (Tipperary); Man of the Match: Darragh O'Connell

== Top scorers ==
Overall

Rank	Player	Club	Tally	Total	Matches	Average
1	David Treacy	Cuala	0–39	39	5	7.80
2	Con O'Callaghan	Cuala	7–15	36	5	7.20
3	Niall Deasy	Ballyea	2–29	35	4	8.75
4	Cormac O'Doherty	Slaughtneil	2–22	28	3	9.33
5	Mark Bergin	O'Loughlin Gaels	1–18	21	2	10.50
5	Tony Kelly	Ballyea	1–18	21	4	5.25
7	Maol Connolly	Loughgiel Shamrocks	0–16	16	2	8.00
7	Pa Bourke	Thurles Sarsfields	0–16	16	2	8.00
9	Marty Kavanagh	St Mullin's	1–12	15	2	7.50
10	Patrick Horgan	Glen Rovers	0–13	13	2	6.50

Single game

Rank	Player	Club	Tally	Total	Opposition
1	Con O'Callaghan	Cuala	4–3	15	Borris-in-Ossory–Kilcotton
2	Niall Deasy	Ballyea	1–11	14	St Thomas'
3	Tony Kelly	Ballyea	1–10	13	Thurles Sarsfields
4	Marty Kavanagh	St Mullin's	1–10	13	Raharney
5	Cormac O'Doherty	Slaughtneil	1–9	12	Loughgiel Shamrocks
6	Cormac O'Doherty	Slaughtneil	1–8	11	Middletown
6	Mark Bergin	O'Loughlin Gaels	1–8	11	Oulart–The Ballagh
6	Maol Connolly	Loughgiel Shamrocks	0–11	11	Ballygalget
6	David Treacy	Cuala	0–11	11	O'Loughlin Gaels
10	Mark Bergin	O'Loughlin Gaels	0–10	10	Cuala

== Team summaries ==
Team	County	Captain(s)	Manager	Most recent success		
Team	County	Captain(s)	Manager	All-Ireland	Provincial	County
Ballygalget	Down	Danny Toner	Johnny McGrattan		2005	2003
Ballygunner	Waterford	Brian O'Sullivan	Denis Walsh		2001	2015
Ballyea	Clare	Stan Lineen	Robbie Hogan			
Borris-in-Ossory–Kilcotton	Laois	Brian Stapleton	Ken Hogan			
Cuala	Dublin	Oisín Gough	Mattie Kenny			2015
Glen Rovers	Cork	Graham Callinan	Richie Kelleher	1977	1976	2015
Lisbellaw	Fermanagh					2013
Loughgiel Shamrocks	Antrim	D. D. Quinn	Johnny Campbell	2012	2013	2013
Middletown	Armagh	Shea Gaffney; David Carvill	Arthur Hughes			2014
O'Loughlin Gaels	Kilkenny	Brian Hogan	Aidan Fogarty		2010	2010
Oulart–The Ballagh	Wexford	Garrett Sinnott	Frank Flannery		2015	2015
Patrickswell	Limerick	Thomas O'Brien	Gary Kirby		1990	2003
Raharney	Westmeath					2015
Slaughtneil	Derry	Chrissy McKaigue	Michael McShane			2015
St Mullin's	Carlow					2015
St Rynagh's	Offaly	Seán Dolan	Francis Forde		1993	1993
St Thomas'	Galway	Patrick Skehill	John Burke	2012		2012
Thurles Sarsfields	Tipperary	Pádraic Maher	Tommy Maher		2012	2015
