= O'Garney Park =

Sports stadium in County Clare, Ireland

- Páirc Uí gCearnaigh
- Location within Ireland
- Location: School Road, Sixmilebridge, County Clare, Ireland
- Coordinates: 52.744719°N 8.777783°W
- Owner: Sixmilebridge GAA
- Capacity: 7,000
- Surface: Grass
- Public transit: Sixmilebridge railway station Sixmilebridge bus stop (Pound Street, Bus Éireann route 343)

O'Garney Park (Irish: Páirc Uí gCearnaigh) is a GAA stadium in Sixmilebridge, County Clare, Ireland. It is the home of Sixmilebridge GAA club and is one of the main grounds of Clare GAA's Gaelic football and hurling teams.

It can hold about 7,000 spectators, including an 800-seater stand. It first saw inter-county use in the 1994–95 National Hurling League. Today, it sees inter-county hurling in the Munster Senior Hurling League.
