= Sixmilebridge GAA =

Gaelic games club in County Clare, Ireland

Sixmilebridge
- Droichead Abhann Ó gCearnaigh
- Founded: 1904
- County: Clare
- Nickname: The Bridge
- Colours: Saffron and blue
- Grounds: O'Garney Park
- Coordinates: 52°44′41.91″N 8°46′39.93″W

Playing kits
Standard colours

Senior Club Championships
| | All Ireland | Munster champions | Clare champions |
|---|---|---|---|
| Hurling: | 1 | 3 | 15 |
| Camogie: | 0 | 1 | 9 |

Sixmilebridge is a Gaelic Athletic Association club in Sixmilebridge, County Clare, Ireland.

== History ==
Sixmilebridge GAA Club was founded in 1904. The first recorded matches were at junior hurling and football level against Newmarket-on-Fergus with the hurlers winning and the footballers losing 2–07 to 0–02.

The first recorded championship success was in 1940. Kilkishen were defeated in the Clare Intermediate Hurling Championship by Newmarket-on-Fergus. A further ten years elapsed before Sixmilebridge won the Clare Junior A Hurling Championship. In 1951 they won the Clare Intermediate Hurling Championship beating Ennis Dalcassians in the final.

The following year the Bridge reached the county senior final only to be beaten by Scariff. In 1954 Sixmilebridge won their first ever senior trophy winning the Clare Cup against Newmarket-on-Fergus on a scoreline of 4-06 to 2-06.

The next county final appearance was in 1962, where they lost to Ruan in a replay by 3-09 to 2-08. After this defeat Sixmilebridge slipped into senior wilderness for more than a decade.

1968 saw the formation of a minor club. In 1970 the Clare Minor Hurling Championship came to the village for the first time, and the following year the Under-14 title was also a first time visitor to the Bridge. The Under-14 title was won again in 1975 and they represented Clare in the Féile na nGael All-Ireland U-14 Championship.

The Clare Under-21 Hurling Championship and Intermediate titles came to the Bridge in 1971. However they had to wait until 1976 to contest the third senior county final in the club's history. Newmarket-on-Fergus were the opponents and they emerged victorious on a scoreline of 1–11 to 1–05.

In 1977, Sixmilebridge won their first Clare Senior Hurling Championship defeating Kilkishen by 1–06 to 1–05 in the final. They were beaten in the Munster Senior Club Hurling Championship by St. Finbarr's of Cork in a replay. In 1979, the Bridge won the Senior, Under-21 (first of 3 in a row) and Minor (first of 2 in a row) as well.

Seven and a half acres of land were bought in 1978 and the new pitch and dressing rooms were opened in 1982. They won the Senior Championship in 1983 and again in 1984 winning their first Munster Championship beating Patrickswell in the final. County titles also came in 1989, 1992, and 1993.

In 1995, the Tommy Morey memorial stand was officially opened at the club. In the same year, the senior hurlers won the Clare Senior and Munster titles culminating in an All-Ireland Senior Club Hurling Championship title on St. Patrick's Day 1996.

In 2008, Sixmilebridge marked the opening of their new facilities by hosting a challenge match between Clare and Kilkenny.

In 2009 Sixmilebridge captured the Under-21 hurling title as they overcame Wolfe Tones, Shannon, Clooney-Quin, neighbours Cratloe and finally Crusheen in the final.

Sixmilebridge regained the Clare Senior Hurling Championship in 2013 with a victory over near-neighbours and reigning champions Newmarket-on-Fergus.

Sixmilebridge followed that up in 2015 with their twelfth title, beating Clonlara in the county final.

== Honours ==
- All-Ireland Senior Club Hurling Championship (1): 1996
- Munster Senior Club Hurling Championship (3): 1984, 1995, 2000
- Clare Senior Hurling Championship (15): 1977, 1979, 1983, 1984, 1989, 1992, 1993, 1995, 2000, 2002, 2013, 2015, 2017, 2019, 2020,
- Clare Intermediate Hurling Championship (5): 1951, 1957 (as Cappa), 1971, 1988, 1990
- Clare Junior A Hurling Championship (6): 1947 (as Cappa), 1949 (as Cappa), 1950, 1956 (as Cappa), 1981, 2016
- Clare Hurling League Div.1 (Clare Cup) (13): 1954, 1956, 1975, 1976, 1978, 1979, 1980, 1982, 1989, 2000, 2004, 2010, 2013
- Clare Under-21 A Hurling Championship (15): 1971, 1973, 1979, 1980, 1981, 1986, 1988, 1997, 1998, 2002, 2003, 2009, 2011, 2013, 2014
- Clare Minor A Hurling Championship 2025
- Munster Senior Club Camogie Championship (1): 1989
- Clare Club Camogie Championship (9) 1982, 1983, 1984, 1985, 1986, 1987, 1988, 1989, 1990

== Notable players ==
- Davy Fitzgerald
- Niall Gilligan
- Cathal Malone
- Séadna Morey
- Matthew O'Halloran
- Sean Stack
- Noel Casey
