= Clooney-Quin GAA =

Gaelic sports club in County Clare, Ireland

Clooney-Quin
- Cluain Aodha-Cuinche
- Founded: 1888
- County: Clare
- Colours: Red and green
- Grounds: Ballyhickey
- Coordinates: 52.836260°N 8.855603°W

Playing kits
Regular Kit

Senior Club Championships
	All Ireland	Munster champions	Clare champions
Hurling:	-	-	1

Clooney-Quin GAA is a Gaelic Athletic Association club located in the village areas of Clooney and Quin, County Clare in Ireland. The club field teams in hurling and Gaelic Football. The club was founded in 1888 and its most notable player was Amby Power, who captained the Clare 1914 All-Ireland winning team.

In 2017, Clooney-Quin reached their first county senior final in 73 years where they lost to Sixmilebridge after a replay.

== Major honours ==
- Clare Senior Hurling Championship (1): 1942 (as Clooney)
- Munster Intermediate Club Hurling Championship (1): 2006
- Clare Intermediate Hurling Championship (3): 1934 (as Clooney), 1986 (as Clooney), 2006
- Clare Junior A Hurling Championship (2): 1933 (as Clooney), 1966 (as Clooney)
- Clare Junior A Football Championship (2): 2004, 2009
- Clare Minor A Hurling Championship (2): 2006, 2022

== Noted hurlers ==
- Amby Power
- Peter Duggan
- Ryan Taylor
- Aidan Daffy
