= Inagh-Kilnamona GAA =

Hurling club in County Clare, Ireland

Inagh-Kilnamona
- Eidhneach-Cill na Móna
- Founded: 2008
- County: Clare
- Colours: Yellow and green
- Grounds: The Pit, Kilnamona & The Den, Inagh
- Coordinates: 52.877783°N 9.181027°W

Playing kits
Regular Kit	Change Kit

Senior Club Championships
	All Ireland	Munster champions	Clare champions
Hurling:	-	-	1

Inagh-Kilnamona GAA is a Gaelic Athletic Association club based in the parish of Inagh and Kilnamona, County Clare in Ireland. The club field teams in hurling. The present club was formed prior to the 2008 season when Inagh GAA and Kilnamona GAA merged to form one club.

== History ==
The club was set up in 1887. It was originally called Smith O'Brien's, Kilnamona, after the nationalist William Smith O'Brien (1803–64). Kilnamona enjoyed success in the first decade of the 20th century, winning the Clare Senior Hurling Championship in 1902, 1903 and 1908.

In 1902, Kilnamona defeated Barefield in the County Final. The Barefield club alleged that Kilnamona were the pick of four parishes and challenged Kilnamona to a rematch. Kilnamona captain Mick "Curk" Lyons gave the stirring reply: "Kilnamona won the medals and we mean to wear them!".

In 1903, Kilnamona defeated Thomonds in the final.

In 1908, Kilnamona proved too strong for Kilmaley in the semi-final, defeating them by 1–14 to 2–3. They defeated O'Callaghan's Mills in the final on a scoreline of 0–11 to 0–10. The game being played at the Showgrounds, Ennis.

Throughout this decade, there were three captains of the Clare Hurling team that came from Kilnamona: Michael "Curk" Lyons in 1902, Frank Hegarty in 1903 and Michael Hegarty in 1909.

Emigration hit the club hard in the intervening years and their next adult success was not until 1957 when they won the Junior B Championship. They defeated St. John's (Ennis), Kiltannon (Tulla) and Lisheen on their way to the final. On 13 October in Cusack Park, Ennis Kilnamona defeated Tubber by 8–7 to 4–3.

In 1965, Kilnamona won the Clare Junior Hurling Championship. They overcame Cappa/Kilmurry in the semi-final by 5–5 to 4–6. On 3 October, they faced Newmarket-on-Fergus in the final. A late goal by James O'Keefe proved decisive.

1971 saw Kilnamona win the Clare Junior Hurling Championship. They defeated Ballyea in the first round by 5–7 to 3–4. Kilmaley were defeated in the final which was held in Cusack Park Ennis on 14 September.

Kilnamona regained the Clare Junior Hurling Championship in 1975. Kilnamona defeated Éire Óg, Cratloe and Barefield on their way to the final. Kilnamona had goals scored by Michael Kerin, Michael Keane and Milo Keane in the final against Kilmaley.

1989 saw Kilnamona emerge triumphant over Éire Óg in the final of the Junior A Championship. In 1996 Kilnamona regained the title, defeating Kilmaley in the final. The club and defeated near neighbours Inagh in the 1998 Intermediate Championship Final. Kilnamona then won the Senior B Hurling Final soon after, defeating Clonlara on a score of 1–10 to 0–9.

In 2003, Kilnamona amalgamated with Inagh for Juvenile competitions to compete in "A" championships. They enjoyed spectacular success, winning the Under 16 championship in 2006, the minor title in 2005 and 2008 and the under 21 title in 2007 Clare Under-21 Hurling Championship.

In 2007, the Inagh and Kilnamona clubs fully merged.

On 11 October 2026, Inagh-Kilnamona won their first ever Clare Senior Hurling Championship after a 2-18 to 1-14 win against Kilmaley in the final.

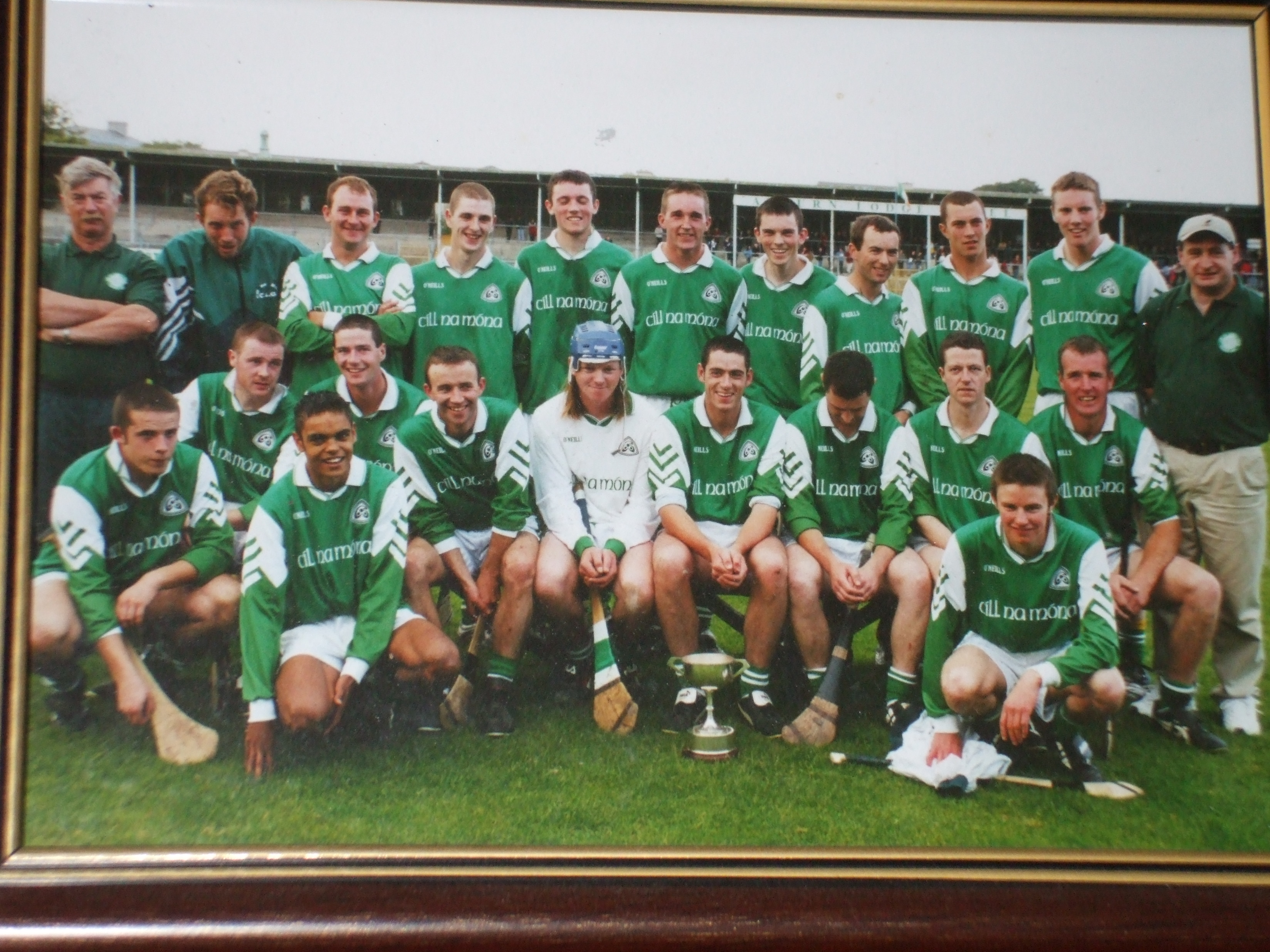
Kilnamona Senior B Champions 1998

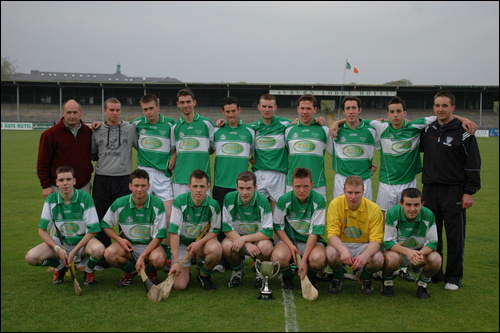
Kilnamona U-21 C Champions 2007

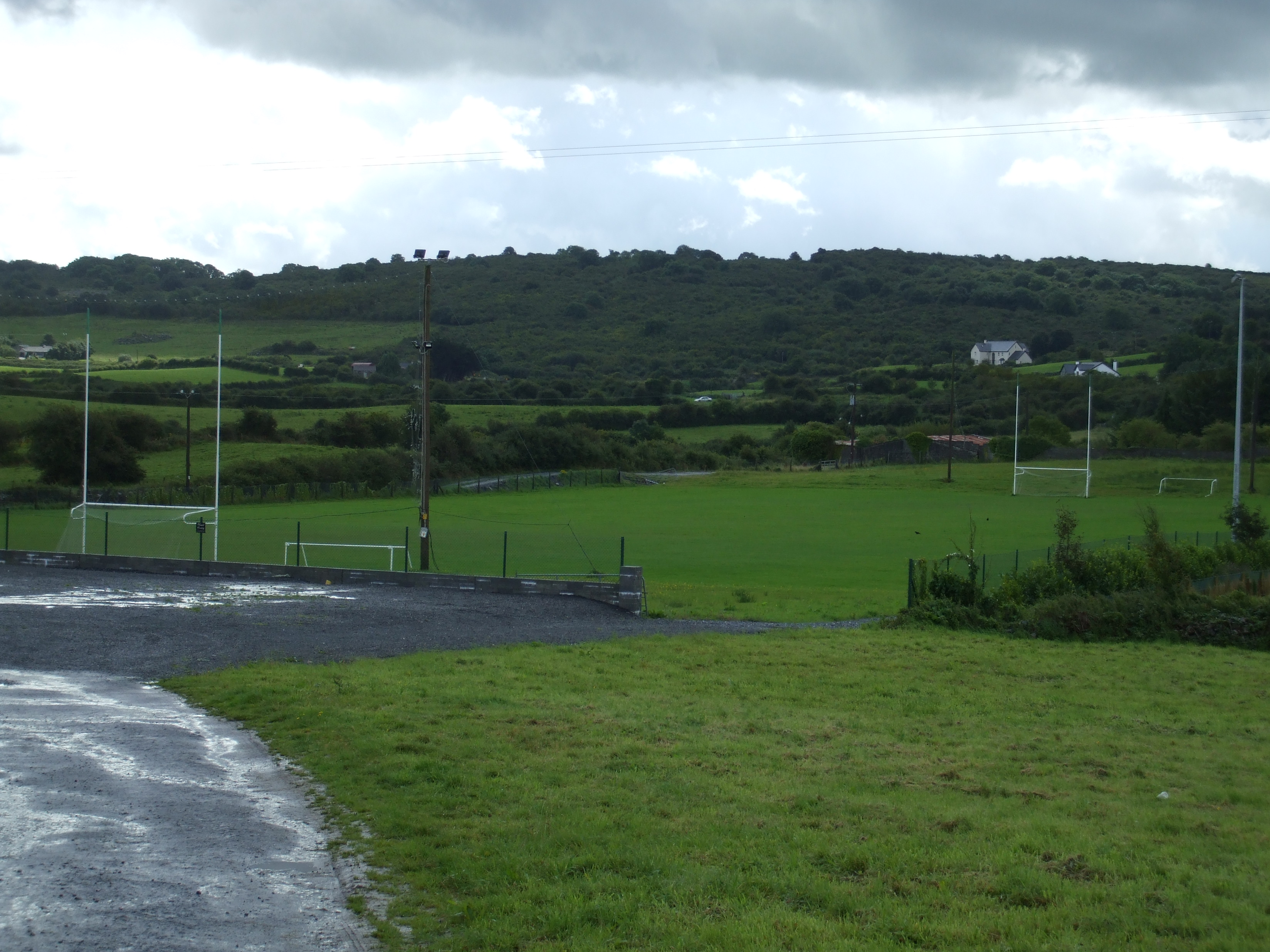
The Pit, Kilnamona Hurling Field

== Major honours ==
=== Kilnamona (1887–2007) ===
- Clare Senior Hurling Championship (3): 1902, 1903, 1908
- Clare Senior B Hurling Championship (1): 1998
- Clare Intermediate Hurling Championship (1): 1998
- Clare Junior A Hurling Championship (5): 1965, 1971, 1975, 1989, 1996
- Clare Junior B Hurling Championship (1): 1957
- Clare Under-21 C Hurling Championship (1): 2007

=== Inagh (1887–2007) ===
- Clare Intermediate Hurling Championship (1): 2005
- Clare Junior Hurling Championship (2): 1984, 1993

=== Inagh-Kilnamona (2007–present) ===
- Clare Senior Hurling Championship Winners: 2026
- Clare Senior Hurling Championship Runners-Up: 2021
- Clare Junior Hurling Championship (1): 2014
- Clare Intermediate Hurling Championship Runners-Up: 2025
- Clare Under-21 A Hurling Championship (4): 2007, 2016, 2018, 2025
- Clare Minor A Hurling Championship (5): 2005, 2008, 2017, 2021, 2023
- Clare Under-16 A Hurling Championship (2): 2006, 2025
