= Crusheen GAA =

GAA club in Clare, Ireland

Crusheen
- Croisín
- County: Clare
- Colours: Red and white

Playing kits
Standard colours

Senior Club Championships
	All Ireland	Munster champions	Clare champions
Hurling:	-	0	2

Crusheen GAA is a Gaelic Athletic Association club located in Crusheen, County Clare, Ireland. The club is almost exclusively concerned with the game of hurling. In October 2010, Crusheen became Clare hurling champions for the first time in their 123-year history with a 2–13 to 1–11 win against Cratloe. In their first ever Munster Club Championship, they were defeated by Kilmallock in the quarter-final by 0–14 to 2–11 In October 2011, Crusheen retained their county title after defeating Sixmilebridge at a waterlogged Cusack Park.

In November 2011, Crusheen played in their first ever Munster Senior Club Hurling Final against Na Piarsaigh from Limerick, the match finishing in a 0–14 to 1–11 draw. In the replay Na Piarsaigh won the title by 1–13 to 0–09.

== Major honours ==
- Munster Senior Club Hurling Championship Runners-Up: 2011
- Clare Senior Hurling Championship (2): 2010, 2011
- Clare Intermediate Hurling Championship (3): 1960, 1987, 2000
- Clare Junior A Hurling Championship (5): 1934, 1941, 1944, 1959, 2010
- Clare Under-21 A Hurling Championship (1): 1969
- Clare Under-21 B Hurling Championship (1): 2021 (with Tubber)

== Noted hurlers ==
- Cian Dillon
- Donal Tuohy
- Pat Vaughan
- Mick Moroney
- Michael McNamara
