= Ballyea GAA =

Gaelic sports club in County Clare, Ireland

Ballyea
- Baile Aodh
- Founded: 1935
- County: Clare
- Colours: Black and amber
- Grounds: Ballyea GAA Grounds
- Coordinates: 52°47′17.60″N 9°01′39.01″W

Playing kits
Regular Kit	Change Kit

Senior Club Championships
	All Ireland	Munster champions	Clare champions
Hurling:	0	1	4

Ballyea is a Gaelic Athletic Association club in the parish of Ballyea / Clarecastle in County Clare, Ireland founded in 1935.

== History ==
In 2016, Ballyea coached by Robbie Hogan won their first ever Clare Senior Hurling Championship when they defeated Clonlara in the final by 2–14 to 1–14 after a replay. The next week on 6 November, they defeated Thurles Sarsfields from Tipperary in the Munster Semi-final by 4–18 to 1–22 after extra-time. On 20 November 2016, Ballyea won the Munster Senior Club Hurling Championship after a 1–21 to 2–10 victory over Glen Rovers at Semple Stadium. On 4 February 2017, Ballyea qualified for the 2017 All-Ireland Senior Club Hurling Championship Final after a 1–19 to 2–14 win against St. Thomas in the semi-final at Semple Stadium. Having led by 13 points in the second half, they overcame a late fightback by St. Thomas's to win by 2 points. In the final on 17 March 2017 against Cuala from Dublin, Ballyea lost by 2–19 to 1–10.

In 2018, Ballyea captained by Tony Kelly won their second county senior hurling title after a 1–20 to 1–14 victory against Cratloe.

In 2022, Ballyea completed their first ever back-to-back county championship win, with James Murphy lifting the Canon Hamilton trophy, with a one-point win over their neighbours Éire Óg, Ennis, a year after beating Inagh-Kilnamona by the same margin in 2021.

== Major honours ==
- All-Ireland Senior Club Hurling Championship Runners-Up: 2017
- Munster Senior Club Hurling Championship (1): 2016
- Clare Senior Hurling Championship (4): 2016, 2018, 2021, 2022
- Clare Intermediate Hurling Championship (2): 1944, 2001
- Clare Junior A Hurling Championship (3): 1940, 1982, 1991
- Clare Under-21 A Hurling Championship (1): 2012

== Notable players ==
- Jack Browne
- Paul Flanagan
- Tony Griffin
- Tony Kelly
- Gary Brennan
