= O'Callaghan's Mills GAA =

Gaelic games club in County Clare, Ireland

O'Callaghan's Mills
- Muillte Uí Cheallacháin
- County: Clare
- Colours: Green and Yellow
- Grounds: Hamilton Park, Kilkishen

Playing kits
Regular Kit	Change Kit

Senior Club Championships
	All Ireland	Munster champions	Clare champions
Hurling:	-	-	8

O'Callaghan's Mills GAA is a Gaelic Athletic Association club based in O'Callaghan's Mills, County Clare, Ireland. The club fields teams in both hurling and Gaelic football.

== Major honours ==
- Clare Senior Hurling Championship (8): 1904, 1906, 1909, 1910, 1918, 1923 (as Kilkishen), 1932 (as Kilkishen), 1937
- Clare Premier Intermediate Hurling Championship (6): 1929 (as Kilkishen), 1933, 1935 (as Kilkishen), 1968, 1977, 2025
- Clare Junior A Hurling Championship (1): 2020
- Clare Junior A Football Championship (1): 2007
- Clare Hurling League Div. 1 (Clare Cup) (5): 1990, 1991, 1993, 1995, 2023

== Notable players ==
- Patrick Donnellan
- Pa "Fowler" McInerney
- Tom McInerney
- P. J. O'Connell
- Conor Cooney
