= 1982 All-Ireland Senior Club Hurling Championship final =

1982 All-Ireland Senior Club Hurling Championship Final
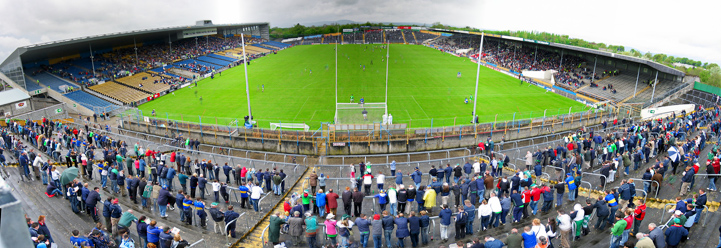
- Event: 1981–82 All-Ireland Senior Club Hurling Championship
| James Stephens | Mount Sion |
| 3-13 | 3-8 |
- Date: 16 May 1982
- Venue: Semple Stadium, Thurles
- Referee: George Ryan (Tipperary)
- Attendance: 6,300

The 1982 All-Ireland Senior Club Hurling Championship final was a hurling match played at Croke Park on 16 May 1982 to determine the winners of the 1981–82 All-Ireland Senior Club Hurling Championship, the 12th season of the All-Ireland Senior Club Hurling Championship, a tournament organised by the Gaelic Athletic Association for the champion clubs of the four provinces of Ireland. The final was contested by James Stephens of Kilkenny and Mount Sion of Waterford, with James Stephens winning by 3–13 to 3–8.

In the first and only championship meeting between the two sides, the All-Ireland final produced a glut of goals. Billy Walton of James Stephens pointed after just two minutes when he converted a free after John Joe Cullen was fouled. Mick Crotty and Jim Greene exchanged a series of tit-for-tat points. Billy Walton then had two points but Mount Sion supporters were cheering when Anthony Cooney shot to the net before Jim Greene, who was in brilliant form, put on a point to leave the Waterford side in front by 1–5 to 0–6. Mount Sion piled on the pressure when John Dalton scored a goal before Cooney and Greene pointed to give them a 2–7 to 0–6 lead.

What might be regarded as the turning point came when a good centre by Billy Walton, which appeared to be going wide, was tipped into the net by John McCormack. He quickly sent over a point to leave just the minimum between the teams. Mount Sion struck again when John Dalton had his second goal which left the Waterford side 3–7 to 1–9 in front. James Stephens hit back in style when Fan Larkin moved out to midfield to take a pass from Paddy Neary from a cut-in. His long delivery dropped in the Mount Sion goalmouth and McCormack tapped it home. Jim Greene put Mount Sion a point ahead but Ned Kelly tied the match for the fourth time. Greene subsequently tried to force his way through the James Stephens defence, however, the referee awarded a free out for an off-the-ball incident. Mick Crotty dispossessed Denis Shefflin and kicked the ball forward for John McCormack to finish to the net for his hat-trick. Billy Walton had two more points before the end to secure a five-point victory.

== Match ==
=== Details ===
16 May 1982

| James Stephens | 3-13 - 3-8 | Mount Sion |
|---|---|---|
| B Walton 0-10 (7f), J McCormack 3-0, M Crotty 0-1, T McCormack 0-1. | | J Greene 0-7 (3f), J Dalton 2-0, A Cooney 1-1. |

Semple Stadium, Thurles
Attendance: 6,300
Referee: G Ryan (Tipperary)
