= Pa McInerney =

Irish hurler (1893–1987)

Pa 'Fowler' McInerney
Personal information
- Native name: Pádraig Mac an Airchinnigh (Irish)
- Nickname: Fowler
- Born: 14 December 1893 O'Callaghans Mills, County Clare, Ireland
- Died: 15 January 1987 (aged 93) Ballyboden, Dublin, Ireland
- Occupation: Garda Síochána

Sport
- Sport: Hurling
- Position: Goalkeeper
Clubs
- Years: Club
- O'Callaghan's Mills; Garda
Club titles
- Dublin titles: 4
Inter-county
- Years: County
- 1913–1926 1927–1931 1932–1933: Clare; Dublin; Clare
Inter-county titles
- Munster titles: 2
- Leinster titles: 3
- All-Irelands: 2
- NHL: 1
- All Stars: 1

Pa "Fowler" McInerney (14 December 1893 – 15 January 1987) was an Irish hurler who played as a goalkeeper and full-back for the Clare and Dublin senior teams.

Born in O'Callaghan's Mills, County Clare, McInerney first arrived on the inter-county scene at the age of twenty-one when he first linked up with the Clare senior team, before later lining out with the Dublin team before returning to the Clare colours. He made his senior debut in the 1913 championship. McInerney went on to enjoy a twenty year inter-county career, and won two All-Ireland medals, two Munster medals, three Leinster medals and one National Hurling League medals. He was an All-Ireland runner-up on two occasions.

McInerney represented the Leinster inter-provincial team at various times throughout his career, winning one Railway Cup medal. At club level he won six championship medals, playing with O'Callaghan's Mills and Garda.

His retirement came following the conclusion of the 1933 championship.

MicInerney was the fourth recipient of the All-Time All-Star Award in 1983, and was chosen at full-back on a special all-time Garda hurling team.

== Playing career ==
=== Club ===
McInerney won his first championship medal with O'Callaghan's Mills in 1910. He added a second to his collection in 1918 following a defeat of Scariff.

A move to Dublin saw McInerney join the Garda club which enjoyed an unprecedented run of success in the late twenties. Five successive championship titles were annexed between 1925 and 1929, with McInerney lining out in the victories of 1927, 1928 and 1929.

McInerney won his last championship medal with Garda in 1931.

=== Inter-county ===
==== Beginnings with Clare ====
McInerney first lined out for Clare in 1913, at a time when the team's fortunes were about to take an upturn.

In 1914 Clare defeated Kerry and Tipperary to reach their first provincial decider in over a decade. Cork provided the opposition and, after a close hour of hurling, Clare emerged victorious by 3–2 to 3–1. It was McInerney's first Munster medal. This victory set up an All-Ireland final meeting with Laois on 18 October 1914. A hat-trick of goals from Jim Guerin, an opening goal from Jim Clancy and a second half goal from Martin Moloney set up a 5–1 to 1–0 victory. It was Clare's first All-Ireland title and a first winners' medal for McInerney.

Clare surrendered their Munster and All-Ireland crowns in 1915 following an 8–2 to 2–1 trouncing by Cork in the provincial decider.

In 1918 McInerney's side faced another humiliating Munster final defeat, this time when Limerick triumphed by 11–3 to 1–2.

==== Transfer to Dublin ====
After more than a decade with Clare, McInerney transferred to Dublin in 1927. He won his first Leinster medal that year following a 7–7 to 4–6 defeat of Kilkenny. On 4 September 1927 Dublin faced reigning champions Cork in the All-Ireland decider. McInerney was one of nine members of the Garda Síochána on the Dublin team who took a 2–3 to 0–1 lead at half-time. Cork fought back in the third quarter, however, McInerney collected his second All-Ireland medal following a 4–8 to 1–3 victory.

McInerney added a second Leinster medal to his collection in 1928 following a 9–7 to 4–3 defeat of Offaly.

In 1930 McInerney's Dublin renewed their rivalry with Cork, this time in the final of the National Hurling League. A 7–4 to 5–5 victory gave him his first league medal. He later secured a third Leinster medal, when Laois were downed by 4–7 to 2–2 in the provincial final. This victory paved the way for an All-Ireland showdown with Tipperary on 7 September 1930. Goals at the end of the first half from Martin Kennedy and John Joe Callanan gave Tipp a platform to secure a 2–7 to 1–3 victory.

==== Return to Clare ====
In 1932 McInerney returned to the Clare senior hurling team. His return was a fruitful one as the team reached the Munster decider against Cork. The game itself saw Clare triumph for the first time since 1914. A score line of 5–2 to 4–1 gave McInerney his second Munster medal. Near neighbours Galway were accounted for in the All-Ireland semi-final, before Clare faced Kilkenny in the decider on 4 September 1932. In a low-scoring but tense game Clare's Tull Considine scored two goals and was foiled for what would almost certainly have been a third. These goals were negated by Kilkenny's three goal-scoring heroes Matty Power, Martin White and Lory Meagher. The final score of 3–3 to 2–3 gave victory to Kilkenny.

McInerney retired from inter-county hurling in 1933.

=== Inter-provincial ===
McInerney's inter-county performances ensured his selection on the inaugural Leinster team for the inter-provincial championship. A 7–6 to 3–5 defeat of Connacht gave him a Railway Cup medal.

Leinster faced defeat at the hands of Munster in the deciders of 1928 and 1929.

== Recognition ==
As a hurler who claimed every honour in the game, McInerney became (in 1983) the third recipient of the GAA All-Time All-Star Award.

In 2004 McInerney was chosen as full-back on a special all-time hurling team made up of members of the Garda Síochána.

== Honours ==
=== Player ===
O'Callaghan's Mills

- Clare Senior Club Hurling Championship (2): 1910, 1918

Garda

- Dublin Senior Club Hurling Championship (4): 1927, 1928, 1929, 1931

Clare

- All-Ireland Senior Hurling Championship (1): 1914
- Munster Senior Hurling Championship (2): 1914, 1932

Dublin

- All-Ireland Senior Hurling Championship (1): 1927
- Leinster Senior Hurling Championship (3): 1927, 1928, 1930
- National Hurling League (1): 1929–30

Leinster

- Railway Cup (1): 1927

=== Individual ===
Awards

- GAA All-Time All-Star Award (1): 1982
- Garda All-Time Hurling Team (1922–2004): Full-back

Awards
Preceded by Garrett Howard (Limerick)	GAA All-Time All-Star Award; 1982	Succeeded by Jim Langton (Kilkenny)
