= John Fox (hurler) =

Irish hurler (1892–1967)

Personal information
- Native name: Seán Ó Sionnaigh (Irish)
- Born: 31 March 1892 Newmarket-on-Fergus, County Clare, Ireland
- Died: 22 July 1967 (aged 75) Ennis, County Clare, Ireland
- Occupations: Soldier, labourer
- Height: 6 ft 1 in (185 cm)

Sport
- Sport: Hurling
Club
- Years: Club
- Newmaret-on-Fergus
Club titles
- Clare titles: 4
Inter-county
- Years: County
- Clare
Inter-county titles
- Munster titles: 1
- All-Irelands: 1

John Fox (31 March 1892 – 22 July 1967) was an Irish hurler. At club level he played with Newmarket-on-Fergus, and also lined out at inter-county level with the Clare senior hurling team.

== Career ==
Fox first played hurling in his local area with the Newmarket-on-Fergus club. He was part of the Newmarket team that succeeded in winning their very first Clare SHC title in 1912, before claiming a second winners' medal in 1916. By that stage, Fox's performances at club level had earned him a call-up to the Clare senior hurling team. He won a Munster SHC medal in 1914, before later lining out at wing-back in Clare's defeat of Laois in the 1914 All-Ireland final.

After enlisting in the British Army, Fox's hurling career was brought to a sudden end as it contravened the GAA's Rule 21. He later resumed his club hurling with Newmarket, and claimed further Clare SHC medals in 1925 and 1926.

== Personal life and death ==
Fox joined the Royal Munster Fusiliers in 1915, which was somewhat of a propaganda boost for the British recruitment officers. During the Battle of the Somme, he received a serious head injury and returned to hospital in Dublin to recuperate. Fox later worked as a labourer at Dromoland Castle.

Fox died from heart failure at St Joseph's Hospital, Ennis on 22 July 1967, at the age of 75.

== Honours ==
Newmarket-on-Fergus

- Clare Senior Hurling Championship: 1912, 1916, 1925, 1926

Clare

- All-Ireland Senior Hurling Championship: 1914
- Munster Senior Hurling Championship: 1914
