= Jim Spellissy =

Irish hurler (1897–1969)

Personal information
- Nickname: Sham
- Born: 9 May 1896 Ennis, County Clare, Ireland
- Died: 24 June 1969 (aged 73) Clontarf, Dublin, Ireland
- Occupation: Clerk

Sport
- Sport: Hurling
Club
- Years: Club
- Ennis Dalcassians
Inter-county
- Years: County
- Clare
Inter-county titles
- Munster titles: 1
- All-Irelands: 1

James Spellissy (9 May 1896 – 24 June 1969) was an Irish hurler. At club level he played with Ennis Dalcassians, and also lined out at inter-county level with the Clare senior hurling team.

== Career ==
Spellissy first played hurling in his local area with the Ennis Dalcassians club. During a successful period for the club, he was part of the Clare SHC-winning teams in 1914 and 1915. By that stage, Spellissy was already playing for the Clare senior hurling team after impressing in a series of challenge games. He won a Munster SHC medal in 1914, before later lining out in Clare's defeat of Laois in the 1914 All-Ireland final.

== Death ==
Spellissy died on 24 June 1969, at the age of 73.

== Honours ==
Ennis Dalcassians

- Clare Senior Hurling Championship: 1914, 1915

Clare

- All-Ireland Senior Hurling Championship: 1914
- Munster Senior Hurling Championship: 1914
