= Willie Considine =

Irish hurler (1885–1959)

Personal information
- Nickname: Dodger
- Born: 29 July 1885 Ennis, County Clare, Ireland
- Died: 11 September 1959 (aged 74) Ennis, County Clare, Ireland
- Occupation: County council labourer

Sport
- Sport: Hurling
Club
- Years: Club
- Ennis Dalcassians
Club titles
	Football	Hurling
Clare titles	3	3
Inter-county
- Years: County
- 1904-1916: Clare
Inter-county titles
- Munster titles: 1
- All-Irelands: 1

William Considine (29 July 1885 – 11 September 1959) was an Irish hurler. At club level he played with Ennis Dalcassians, and also lined out at inter-county level with the Clare senior hurling team.

== Career ==
Considine first played hurling in his local area with the Ennis Dalcassians club. During a successful period for the club, he was part of the Clare SHC-winning teams in 1911, 1914 and 1915. His other club honours include three Clare SFC medals. By that stage, Considine was already playing for the Clare senior hurling team, having made his debut in 1904. He won a Munster SHC medal in 1914, before later lining out at corner-back in Clare's defeat of Laois in the 1914 All-Ireland final. McGrath continued to play for Clare until 1916.

== Personal life and death ==
Considine's younger brothers, Tull and Brendan, also played inter-county hurling. He was a close friend of Éamon de Valera, was a canvasser in the 1917 East Clare by-election campaign before later playing a role with the Irish Republican Army during the War of Independence.

Considine died on 11 September 1959, at the age of 74.

== Honours ==
Ennis Dalcassians

- Clare Senior Hurling Championship: 1911, 1914, 1915

Clare

- All-Ireland Senior Hurling Championship: 1914
- Munster Senior Hurling Championship: 1914
