= 1965 Munster Senior Club Hurling Championship =

- Dates: 15 May 1966 - 14 May 1967
- Teams: 7
- Champions: St. Finbarr's (1st title); Jim Power (captain)
- Runners-up: Mount Sion

Tournament statistics
- Matches played: 6
- Goals scored: 49 (8.17 per match)
- Points scored: 85 (14.17 per match)
- Top scorer(s): Tony Connolly (4-05)

The 1965 Munster Senior Club Hurling Championship was the second staging of the Munster Senior Club Hurling Championship since its establishment by the Munster Council. The championship, which was open to the champion clubs of 1965, began on 15 May 1966 and ended on 14 May 1967.

On 14 May 1967, St. Finbarr's won the championship after a 3-12 to 2-03 defeat of Mount Sion in the final at the Gaelic Grounds. It was their first ever championship title.

Tony Connolly from the St. Finbarr's club was the championship's top scorer with 4-05.

== Results ==
=== First round ===
15 May 1966 First round	Patrickswell	5-13 - 4-04	Thurles Sarsfields	Gaelic Grounds, Limerick
	R Bennis 2-4, J Shields 1-2, P Carey 1-1, S Casey 0-4, J O'Donnell 1-0, N Leonard 0-1, T O'Brien 0-1.		T Walsh 2-1, J Doyle 1-1, T Semple 1-1, P Butler 0-1.

22 May 1966 First round	Newmarket-on-Fergus	7-03 - 6-07	Mount Sion	Newmarket-on-Fergus
	P McNamara 2-1, P Cronin 1-2, H McCabe 1-0, L Danagher 1-0, J Woods 1-0, G Lohan 1-0.		S Greene 3-0, F Walsh 2-3, S Power 1-1, P Grimes 0-1, P O'Grady 0-1, M Walsh 0-1.

9 June 1966 First round	St. Finbarr's	8-12 - 2-06	Ballyduff	Mardyke, Cork
	T Connolly 4-4, J Hogan 2-2, C Cullinane 1-1, T Sexton 1-0, G McCarthy 0-2, P Doolan 0-1, J Power 0-1, C McCarthy 0-1.		E O'Sullivan 1-1, P O'Connor 1-0, E Diggins 0-3.	Referee: P O'Connell (Tipperary)

=== Semi-finals ===
19 June 1966 Semi-final	Mount Sion	4-10 - 4-07	Patrickswell	Fraher Field, Dungarvan
	S Greene 2-0, D Mahon 0-4, M Flannelly 1-0, S Power 1-0, F Walsh 0-3, L Guinan 0-3.		S Casey 1-1, N Leonard 1-1, J O'Donnell 1-0, Pat Bennis 1-0, R Bennis 0-3, J Shields 0-1, E Carey 0-1.

12 February 1967 Semi-final	St. Finbarr's	3-04 - 1-04	Turloughmore	Cork Athletic Grounds, Cork
	C McCarthy 1-1, C Cullinane 1-0, J McCarthy 1-0, M Archer 0-1, T Connolly 0-1, G McCarthy 0-1.		M Cullinane 1-0, F Coffey 0-1, F Forde 0-1, PJ Qualter 0-1, T Duffy 0-1.	Referee: P O'Connor (Tipperary)

=== Final ===
14 May 1967 Final	St. Finbarr's	3-12 - 2-03	Mount Sion	Gaelic Grounds, Limerick
	P Freeney 0-8, J McCarthy 2-0, E Philpott 1-0, M Archer 0-2, C McCarthy 0-1, G McCarthy 0-1.		L Guinan 1-1, J Flavin 1-0, J Hayes 0-1, M Óg Morrissey 0-1.	Referee: S Moloney (Tipperary)

== Championship statistics ==
=== Top scorers ===
Top scorer overall

Rank	Player	Club	Tally	Total	Matches	Average
1	Tony Connolly	St. Finbarr's	4-05	17	3	5.66

Top scorers in a single game

Rank	Player	Club	Tally	Total	Opposition
1	Tony Connolly	St. Finbarr's	4-04	16	Ballyduff
2	Richie Bennis	Patrickswell	2-04	10	Thurles Sarsfields
3	S. Greene	Mount Sion	3-00	9	Newmarket-on-Fergus
3	Frankie Walsh	Mount Sion	2-03	9	Newmarket-on-Fergus
4	J. Hogan	St. Finbarrs	2-02	8	Ballyduff
4	Pierce Freeney	St. Finbarrs	0-08	8	Mount Sion
