= Jim Clancy (hurler) =

Irish hurler (1890–1971)

Personal information
- Nickname: Bawn
- Born: 1890 Newmarket-on-Fergus, County Clare, Ireland
- Died: 21 January 1971 (aged 80) Ennis, County Clare, Ireland
- Occupation: Builder

Sport
- Sport: Hurling
Club
- Years: Club
- Newmarket-on-Fergus
Inter-county
- Years: County
- Clare
Inter-county titles
- Munster titles: 1
- All-Irelands: 1

James Clancy (1890 – 21 January 1971) was an Irish hurler. At club level he played with Newmarket-on-Fergus, and also lined out at inter-county level with Clare and Dublin.

== Career ==
Clancy first played hurling in his local area with the Newmarket-on-Fergus club. He was part of the Newmarket team that succeeded in winning their very first Clare SHC title in 1912, before claiming a second winners' medal in 1916. Clancy's performances at club level quickly earned him a call-up to the Clare senior hurling team. He won a Munster SHC medal in 1914, before later lining out at wing-back in Clare's defeat of Laois in the 1914 All-Ireland final. Clancy continued lining out for Clare until 1928, by which stage he had won further Clare SHC honours.

== Death ==
Clancy died in Ennis on 21 January 1971, at the age of 80.

== Honours ==
Newmarket-on-Fergus

- Clare Senior Hurling Championship: 1912, 1916, 1925, 1926

Clare

- All-Ireland Senior Hurling Championship: 1914
- Munster Senior Hurling Championship: 1914
