= Jim Guerin =

Irish hurler (1894–1918)

Personal information
- Native name: Séamus Ó Géaráin (Irish)
- Born: 20 October 1894 Ballycar, County Clare, Ireland
- Died: 16 December 1918 (aged 24) Ballycar, County Clare, Ireland
- Occupation: Labourer

Sport
- Sport: Hurling
- Position: Left wing-forward
Clubs
- Years: Club
- 1912-1916 1916-1918: Newmarket-on-Fergus; Ballycar
Club titles
- Clare titles: 2
Inter-county*
| Years | County | Apps (scores) |
| 1914-1918 | Clare | 5 |
Inter-county titles
- Munster titles: 0
- All-Irelands: 1
- *Inter County team apps and scores correct as of 21:08, 1 May 2014.

James Guerin (20 October 1894 – 16 December 1918) was an Irish hurler. At club level he played with Newmarket-on-Fergus and Ballycar, and also lined out at inter-county level with the Clare senior hurling team.

== Career ==
Guerin first played hurling in his local area with the Newmarket-on-Fergus club. He was part of the Newmarket team that succeeded in winning their very first Clare SHC title in 1912. He claimed a second winners' medal in 1916, before transferring to the newly-established Ballycar club. Guerin's performances at club level quickly earned him a call-up to the Clare senior hurling team. After missing Clare's successful Munster SHC campaign in 1914, he was a late addition to the team for the subsequent 1914 All-Ireland final against Laois. Guerin scored three goals in the 5-01 to 1-00 victory. His last game for Clare was a defeat by Limerick in the 1918 Munster final.

== Death ==
Guerin died on 16 December 1918 as a result of the 1918 flu pandemic.

== Honours ==
Newmarket-on-Fergus

- Clare Senior Hurling Championship: 1912, 1916

Clare

- All-Ireland Senior Hurling Championship: 1914
- Munster Senior Hurling Championship: 1914
