= 1981–82 All-Ireland Senior Club Hurling Championship =

All-Ireland Senior Club Hurling Championship 1981–82
Championship Details
- Dates: 27 September 1981 – 16 May 1982

All Ireland Champions
- Winners: James Stephens (2nd win)
- Captain: Jimmy O'Brien

All Ireland Runners-up
- Runners-up: Mount Sion
- Captain: Éamonn Kehoe

Provincial Champions
- Munster: Mount Sion
- Leinster: James Stephens
- Ulster: Ruairí Óg
- Connacht: Gort

Championship Statistics
- Top Scorer: Jim Greene (3–30)

The 1981–82 All-Ireland Senior Club Hurling Championship was the 12th staging of the All-Ireland Senior Club Hurling Championship, the Gaelic Athletic Association's premier inter-county club hurling tournament. The championship ran from 27 September 1981 to 16 May 1982.

Ballyhale Shamrocks of Kilkenny were the defending champions, however, they failed to qualify after being beaten by Fenians in the quarter-finals of the 1981 Kilkenny SHC. Borris–Ileigh of Tipperary, Faythe Harriers of Wexford and Tourlestrane of Sligo made their championship debuts.

The All-Ireland final was played at Semple Stadium in Thurles on 16 May 1982, between James Stephens of Kilkenny and Mount Sion of Waterford, in what was a first championship meeting between the teams. James Stephens won the match by 3–13 to 3–08 to become the first team from Kilkenny to win the title twice.

Mount Sion's Jim Greene was the championship's top scorer with 3–30.

== Connacht Senior Club Hurling Championship ==
=== Connacht first round ===
18 October 1981 First round	Tourlestrane	0–02 – 3–14	Tooreen	Ballyhanis Grounds
	R McVeigh 0-1, J Quinn 0-1.		C Sheridan 1-2, J Cunnane 0-5, P Delaney 1-1, A Henry 1-1, J Henry 0-3, V Henry 0-1, JJ Hoban 0-1.

=== Connacht semi-final ===
28 February 1982 Final	Four Roads	2–09 – 2–10	Tooreen	St Aidan's Park
	P Dolan 0-6, N Lawlor 1-0, M Murphy 1-0, T Fallon 0-2, S Moran 0-1.		J Henry 0-7, A Henry 1-1, M Nolan 1-0, V Henry 0-2.

=== Connacht final ===
28 March 1982 Final	Gort	8–13 – 0–03	Tooreen	Athleague Sportsfield
	K Fahy 3–2, G Lally 3–2, P Piggott 1–4, M Murphy 1–1, G Linnane 0–2, J Crehan 0–1, M Cahill 0–1.		J Henry 0–1, T Flanning 0–1, V Henry 0–1.

== Leinster Senior Club Hurling Championship ==
=== Leinster first round ===
18 October 1981 First round	Carnew Emmets	1–04 – 1–11	Brownstown	Aughrim County Ground
	B Molloy 1–1, S Brennan 0–2, T Sullivan 0–1.		J Garry 1–3, J Leonard 0–4, T Daly 0–1, N Fitzsimons 0–1, J Fitzsimons 0–1, M Geraghty 0–1.

1 November 1981 First round	Killyon	0–08 – 1–09	Ardclough	St Loman's Park
	PJ McKeown 0–5, T Massey 0–2, J Mitchell 0–1.		J Walsh 0–6, B Burke 1–1, P McCarthy 0–1, M Dwane 0–1.

=== Leinster quarter-finals ===
14 November 1981 Quarter-final	Brownstown	1–07 – 1–15	James Stephens	Delvin Grounds
	J Henry 1–1, J Leonard 0–3, J Fitzsimons 0–2, T Daly 0–1.		B Walton 0–5, J McCormack 1–1, D McCormack 0–3, M Crotty 0–3, M Hennessy 0–1, P Brennan 0–1, A Egan 0–1.

14 November 1981 Quarter-final	Faythe Harriers	v	St. Vincent's	Wexford Park

14 November 1981 Quarter-final	Naomh Eoin	0–05 – 5–11	Portlaoise	Dr Cullen Park
	E Quirke 0–4, P Quirke 0–1.		P Critchley 2–1, J Bohane 1–1, M Bohane 1–1, L Bergin 0–4, M Keegan 1–0, B Bohane 0–2, S Plunkett 0–1, M Conroy 0–1.

21 November 1981 Quarter-final	Ardclough	4–05 – 3–13	St. Rynagh's	Dan Graham Memorial Park
	M Dwane 2–0, J Walsh 1–2, J Tompkins 1–0, P McCarthy 0–1, B Burke 0–1, E King 0–1.		D Devery 1–2, G Dolan 1–2, P Horan 0–5, F Kenny 1–0, D Fogarty 0–3, N Molloy 0–1.

=== Leinster semi-finals ===
29 November 1981 Semi-final	Faythe Harriers	3–09 – 2–07	St. Rynagh's	Nowlan Park

29 November 1981 Semi-final	James Stephens	2–15 – 0–09	Portlaoise	Geraldine Park
	B Walton 1–7, A Egan 1–0, J McCormack 0–3, M Crotty 0–2, D Collins 0–1, P Brennan 0–1, Danny McCormack 0–1.		B Bohane 0–6, S Burke 0–1, L Bergin 0–1, J Keenan 0–1.

=== Leinster final ===
21 March 1982 Final	James Stephens	0–13 – 1–09	Faythe Harriers	Geraldine Park
	B Walton 0–4, D McCormack 0–4, A Egan 0–2, M Hennessy 0–1, J McCormack 0–1, M Crotty 0–1.		B Murphy 1–2, N Buggy 0–5, J Walker 0–1, P O'Gorman 0–1.	Referee: M Kelleher (Kildare)

== Munster Senior Club Hurling Championship ==
=== Munster quarter-finals ===
27 September 1981 Quarter-final	St. Finbarr's	0–10 – 3–11	Newmarket-on-Fergus	Páirc Uí Chaoimh
	C Ryan 0–3, É Fitzpatrick 0–2, T Finn 0–1, J Barry-Murphy 0–1, B O'Brien 0–1, T Maher 0–1, J Meyler 0–1.		P McNamara 2–0, E Moore 0–5, M Kilmartin 1–1, T Ryan 0–3, M Ryan 0–1, D Hayes 0–1.

18 October 1981 Quarter-final	Causeway	2–05 – 2–10	Mount Sion	Causeway Grounds
	P Moriarty 1–2, DJ Leahy 1–0, J O'Regan 0–2, M Leahy 0–1.		J Greene 0–6, T Butler 1–0, D Connolly 1–0, A Cooney 0–2, P Ryan 0–1, M Geary 0–1.

=== Munster semi-final ===
1 November 1981 Semi-final	Mount Sion	2–12 – 0–12	Borris-Ileigh	Walsh Park
	J Greene 1–6, M Geary 1–1, P Ryan 0–3, P McGrath 0–2.		N O'Dwyer 0–10, P Kavanagh 0–1, P Ryan 0–1.

15 November 1981 Semi-final	Newmarket-on-Fergus	1–05 – 2–09	South Liberties	Father Murphy Memorial Park
	M Kilmartin 1–0, T Ryan 0–2, E Moore 0–1, P McNamara 0–1, P Devanney 0–1.		M Butler 0–5, W Shanahan 1–0, T Ryan 1–0, M Grimes 0–2, M Shanahan 0–1, J McKenna 0–1.

=== Munster final ===
29 November 1981 Final	Mount Sion	3–09 – 1–04	South Liberties	Walsh Park
	J Greene 1–6, P Kelly 1–1, M Geary 1–0, P O'Grady 0–1, A Cooney 0–1.		J McKenna 1–2, W Shanahan 0–1, J Moynihan 0–1.

== Ulster Senior Club Hurling Championship ==
=== Ulster semi-final ===
27 September 1981 Semi-final	Clontibret O'Neills	0–02 – 2–04	Portaferry	Páirc Uí Néill
	W Connoly 0-1, P Curran 0-1.		C Duff 1-0, N Fitzsimmons 1-0, B McGeehan 0-3, L McMullan 0-1.

=== Ulster final ===
18 October 1981 Final	Ruairí Óg, Cushendall	4–17 – 0–09	Portaferry	Páirc Mhuire
	M Delargy 2–0, B McAuley 1–3, R Hyndman 0–6, D McNaughton 1–1, L McKillop 0–4, D McNaughton 0–2, M McKeegan 0–1.		L McMullan 0–4, B Orr 0–2, P McMullan 0–1, R Mageean 0–1, N Fitzsimons 0–1.

== All-Ireland Senior Club Hurling Championship ==
=== All-Ireland quarter-final ===
11 April 1982 Quarter-final	Gort	4–12 – 0–09	St Gabriel's	Ballinasloe Grounds
	G Lally 1-5, K Fahy 1-0, J Crehan 1-0, P Neylon 1-0, P Piggott 0-2, G Linnane 0-2, M Cahill 0-2, S Linnane 0-1.		T Burke 0-5, S Davoren 0-3, M Linnane 0-1.

=== All-Ireland semi-finals ===
25 April 1982 Semi-final	James Stephens	1–13 – 1–08	Gort	Nowlan Park, Kilkenny
	B Walton 0–9, JJ Cullen 1–0, M Crotty 0–3, A Egan 0–1.		G Lally 1–4, S Linnane 0–1, P Piggott 0–1, J Crehan 0–1, M Murphy 0–1.

25 April 1982 Semi-final	Mount Sion	1–14 – 1–08	Ruairí Óg, Cushendall	Walsh Park, Waterford
	J Greene 1–5, C Heffernan 0–3, J Dalton 0–2, D Connolly 0–1, P O'Grady 0–1, A Cooney 0–1, T Butler 0–1.		M Delargy 1–0, D McNaughton 0–3, D McNaughton 0–2, T McNaughton 0–2, L McKillop 0–1.

Final

16 May 1982 Final	James Stephens	3–13 – 3–08	Mount Sion	Semple Stadium, Thurles
	B Walton 0–10, J McCormack 3–0, M Crotty 0–1, T McCormack 0–1.		J Greene 0–7, J Dalton 2–0, A Cooney 1–1.	Referee: G Ryan (Tipperary)

== Championship statistics ==
=== Top scorers ===
Rank	Player	Club	Tally	Total	Matches	Average
1	Jim Greene	Mount Sion	3–30	39	5	7.80
2	Billy Walton	James Stephens	1–35	38	5	7.60
3	Gerry Lally	Gort	5–11	26	3	8.66
