= Jim Cullinan =

Irish hurler (1942–2020)

Personal information
- Native name: Séamus Ó Cuileannáin (Irish)
- Nickname: Puddin
- Born: 1942 Newmarket-on-Fergus, County Clare, Ireland
- Died: 11 February 2020 (aged 77) Ennis, County Clare, Ireland

Sport
- Sport: Hurling
- Position: Centre-back
Clubs
- Years: Club
- Newmarket-on-Fergus; Éire Óg
Club titles
- Clare titles: 10
- Munster titles: 1
Inter-county*
Years	County	Apps (scores)
1961–1977	Clare	22 (1-04)
Inter-county titles
- Munster titles: 0
- All-Irelands: 0
- NHL: 1
- All Stars: 0
- *Inter County team apps and scores correct as of 18:32, 17 February 2020.

James Cullinan (1942 – 11 February 2020) was an Irish hurler who played for Clare Senior Championship clubs Newmarket-on-Fergus and Éire Óg. He played for the Clare senior hurling team for 15 seasons, during which time he usually lined out as a centre-back.

== Honours ==
Newmarket-on-Fergus

- Munster Senior Club Hurling Championship (1): 1967 (c)

Clare

- National Hurling League (1): 1976-77

Munster

- Railway Cup (4): 1963, 1968, 1969, 1970
