= Phil Larkin =

Kilkenny hurler (born 1941)

Personal information
- Native name: Pilib Ó Lorcáin (Irish)
- Nickname: Fan
- Born: 5 October 1941 (age 85) Kilkenny, Ireland
- Occupation: Plasterer
- Height: 5 ft 4 in (163 cm)

Sport
- Sport: Hurling
- Position: Right corner-back
Clubs
- Years: Club
- Clann na Gael; James Stephens
Club titles
- Kilkenny titles: 4
- Leinster titles: 2
- All-Ireland Titles: 2
Inter-county*
Years	County	Apps (scores)
1962–1980	Kilkenny	35 (0-00)
Inter-county titles
- Leinster titles: 9
- All-Irelands: 5
- NHL: 1
- All Stars: 4
- *Inter County team apps and scores correct as of 14:12, 16 November 2014.

Philip Francis "Fan" Larkin (born 5 October 1941) is an Irish former hurler who played as a right corner-back at senior level for the Kilkenny county team.

Born in Kilkenny, Larkin first played competitive hurling during his schooling at Kilkenny City Vocational School. He arrive don the inter-county scene at the age of seventeen when he first linked up with the Kilkenny minor team. He made his senior debut during the 1962–63 league. Larkin went on to enjoy a lengthy career with the team, winning five All-Ireland medals, nine Leinster medals and one National Hurling League medal. He was an All-Ireland runner-up on three occasions.

As a member of the Leinster inter-provincial team on a number of occasions, Larkin won five Railway Cup medals. At club level he is a two-time All-Ireland medallist with James Stephens. In addition to this he also won two Leinster medals and a grand total of seven championship medals as a dual player.

His father, Paddy, and his son, Philly, also enjoyed multiple All-Ireland successes with Kilkenny.

Throughout his career Larkin made 35 championship appearances. He retired from inter-county hurling prior to the start of the 1980 championship.

In retirement from playing Larkin became involved in team management and coaching. As well as a brief spell as manager of the Kilkenny senior team, he also served as an inter-county and club selector.

During his playing days, Larkin won four All-Star awards, while he was also chosen on a special supreme All-Star team. Larkin was named at right corner-back on the Kilkenny Hurling Team of the Century, while he was also chosen as one of the 125 greatest hurlers of all-time in a 2009 poll.

== Playing career ==
=== Club ===
Larkin first tasted club success as a Gaelic footballer with Clann na Gael in 1962. Having lost the original fixture a replay was ordered following a Clann na Gael objection. A 2–7 to 2–3 defeat of St Senan's gave Larkin a junior championship medal.

After making the step up to the senior ranks in 1963, Clann na Gael continued their winning ways. A 1–6 to 0–2 defeat of Lamogue gave Larkin a first senior football championship medal.

In 1964 Clann na Gael and Lamogue faced each other in the championship decider once again. In a much closer affair both sides finished level. Clann na Gael went on to win the replay by 3–3 to 0–4, giving Larkin a second championship medal.

In 1969 Larkin was in the last line of defence as James Stephens qualified for the senior hurling championship decider for the first time in over thirty years. Fenians provided the opposition, however, the game was delayed until 19 April 1970. Three goals and two points in a devastating opening five minutes paved the way for a comfortable 5–2 to 1–4 half-time lead. James Stephens completed their rout of the Fenians in the second half and recorded an 8–5 to 2–7 victory. It was Larkin's first championship medal.

Defeat at the hands of the Fenians followed for Larkin's side in 1970 and 1973, however, James Stephens made another breakthrough in 1975. A 1–14 to 1–5 defeat of first-time finalists Galmoy gave Larkin a second championship medal. James Stephens subsequently qualified for the provincial decider, with Offaly champions St. Rynagh's providing the opposition. James Stephens took the lead from the third minute, with Liam "Chunky" O'Brien being scorer-in-chief. A 1–14 to 2–4 victory gave Larkin his first Leinster medal. Two-time champions and hot favourites Blackrock provided the opposition in the subsequent All-Ireland decider. "The Rockies" got off to the better start, with two goals by Éamonn O'Donoghue and Pat Moylan giving them a 2–1 lead at the quarter mark. James Stephens trailed at the interval but were transformed in the second half. A 2–10 to 2–4 victory gave Larkin his first All-Ireland medal.

Larkin collected a third championship medal in 1976 as Rower-Inistioge were accounted for by 2–14 to 0–13. It was a successful year for the James Stephens senior football team also. A 1–9 to 0–6 defeat of Railyard gave Larkin a third football championship medal.

After a period of decline, James Stephens bounced back in 1981. A double scores 2–10 to 0–8 defeat of Fenians gave Larkin a fourth championship medal. He later collected a second Leinster medal as championship debutantes Faythe Harriers were narrowly defeated by 0–13 to 1–9. First time finalists Mount Sion of Waterford provided the opposition in the subsequent All-Ireland decider. A hat-trick of goals by John McCormack, together with a ten-point haul from Billy Walton, saw James Stephens fight back from seven points down to record a 3–13 to 3–8 victory. It was a second All-Ireland medal for Larkin.

=== Inter-county ===
==== Minor ====
Larkin was seventeen years-old when he was called up to the Kilkenny minor team in 1959. He won a Leinster medal that year following a 7–9 to 3–4 trouncing of Wexford. He later lined out in the All-Ireland final, with near rivals Tipperary providing the opposition once again. A narrow 2–8 to 2–7 defeat denied Larkin, who had to retire early due to injury, an All-Ireland medal.

==== Early successes ====
Three years later in 1962 Larkin made his senior competitive debut in a National Hurling League game against Tipperary. He was later included on Kilkenny's championship panel and won his first Leinster medal following a 2–10 to 0–9 defeat of Dublin. This victory allowed Kilkenny to advance directly into an All-Ireland showdown with Waterford on 1 September 1963. "The Cats" entered the game as underdogs, however, ace marksman Eddie Keher proved to be the difference with a magnificent display in which he scored fourteen points. Despite a hat-trick of goals from Waterford's Séamus Power, Kilkenny secured a 4–17 to 6–8 victory. It was Larkin's first All-Ireland medal.

Larkin added a second Leinster medal to his collection in 1964 as Dublin were defeated on a 4–11 to 1–8 score line. The All-Ireland final on 6 September 1964 saw Kilkenny enter the game as firm favourites against fierce rivals Tipperary. John McKenna scored Tipp's first goal after ten minutes as the Munster champions took a 1–8 to 0–6 interval lead. The second half saw Tipperary score goals for fun, with Donie Nealon getting a hat-trick and Seán McLoughlin another. Kilkenny were humiliated at the full-time whistle as Tipperary triumphed by 5–13 to 2–8.

After surrendering their provincial crown in 1965, Kilkenny bounced back the following year, however, Larkin was dropped from the team.

==== Return to the team ====
During Larkin's absence from the team Kilkenny won two more All-Ireland titles, however, he returned to the starting fifteen in 1971 as "the Cats" began their complete dominance of the provincial championship. A 6–16 to 3–16 defeat of Wexford gave Larkin his third Leinster medal. On 5 September 1971 Kilkenny faced Tipperary in the All-Ireland final, the first to be broadcast in colour by Telefís Éireann and the only eighty-minute meeting between the two sides. Kilkenny's ever-dependable goalkeeper, Ollie Walsh, had a nightmare of a game in which he conceded five goals, one of which passed through his legs, while that year's Hurler of the Year and Larkin's direct opponent, "Babs" Keating, played out the closing stages of the game in his bare feet. Eddie Keher set a new record by scoring 2–11, however, it wasn't enough as Tipperary emerged the victors on a score line of 5–17 to 5–14.

In 1972 Larkin won a fourth Leinster medal following a thrilling draw and replay victory over Wexford. Cork provided the opposition in the All-Ireland final on 3 September 1972, a game which is often considered to be one of the classic games of the modern era. Halfway through the second-half Cork were on form and stretched their lead to eight points. "The Rebels" failed to score again as Kilkenny went on to claim a remarkable 3–24 to 5–11 victory.

Larkin added a fifth Leinster medal to his collection in 1973 following a 4–22 to 3–15 defeat of Wexford. On 2 September 1973 Kilkenny faced Limerick in the All-Ireland decider. The game hung in the balance for the first-half, however, eight minutes after the restart Mossie Dowling got a vital goal for Limerick. Shortly after this Richie Bennis spearheaded a rampant Limerick attack which resulted in a 1–21 to 1–14 victory for Limerick. In spite if this defeat Larkin finished off the year by winning his first All-Star.

Wexford were, once again, narrowly defeated by Kilkenny in the 1974 provincial decider. The remarkable 6–13 to 2–24 victory gave Larkin a sixth Leinster medal. In a repeat of the previous year Limerick provided the opposition in the subsequent All-Ireland final on 1 September 1974. The Munster champions stormed to a five-point lead in the first eleven minutes, however, a converted penalty by Eddie Keher, supplemented by two further goals gave Kilkenny a 3–19 to 1–13 victory and gave Larkin a third All-Ireland medal. He later won a second All-Star award.

Kilkenny made it five successive provincial titles in-a-row in 1975. The 2–20 to 2–14 defeat of Wexford gave Larkin his seventh Leinster medal. On 7 September 1975, Larkin lined out in another All-Ireland final, with surprise semi-final winners Galway providing the opposition. Playing with the wind in the first half, Galway found themselves ahead by 0–9 to 1–3 at the interval. Eddie Keher's huge tally of 2–7 kept Galway at bay giving Kilkenny a 2–22 to 2–10 victory. He later added a fifth successive All-Star award to his collection.

==== Twilight ====
In 1976 Larkin was appointed captain of the team as Kilkenny looked a sure bet to capture a third successive All-Ireland crown. The season began well with Larkin winning a National League medal following a 6–14 to 1–14 trouncing of Clare in a replay. Kilkenny's championship ambitions unravelled in spectacular fashion in the subsequent provincial campaign, when a 2–20 to 1–6 trouncing by Wexford dumped Larkin's team out of the championship. In spite of this Larkin was later presented with a third All-Star.

Larkin was now very much in the twilight of his career as Kilkenny's fortunes took an upward turn in 1978. A 2–16 to 1–16 defeat of three-in-a-row hopefuls Wexford gave Larkin an eighth Leinster medal. On 3 September 1978 Kilkenny faced reigning champions Cork in the All-Ireland decider. Cork secured a first three-in-a-row of All-Ireland titles for the first time in over twenty years, as a Jimmy Barry-Murphy goal helped the team to a 1–15 to 2–8 victory. Larkin later collected a fourth All-Star award.

In 1979 Larkin won his ninth Leinster medal as Kilkenny defeated Wexford by 2–21 to 2–17. "The Cats" later faced surprise finalists Galway in the All-Ireland decider on 2 September 1979. In one of the worst All-Ireland finals of the decade, Tipperary-born Galway goalkeeper Séamus Shinnors had an absolute nightmare of a game. A 70-yards free by Liam "Chunky" O'Brien after just four minutes dipped, hit off Shinnors and ended up in the Galway net. Galway fought back and went two points up twelve minutes into the second half, however, they failed to score for the rest of the game. Four minutes before the end of the game another long-range free for Kilkenny ended up in the net behind Shinnors. It was a score which summed up the day for Galway as Kilkenny went on to win by 2–12 to 1–8. Larkin, the oldest man on the field of play, collected his fifth and final All-Ireland medal.

Larkin remained on the Kilkenny panel early in 1980, but retired from inter-county duty before the start of the championship.

=== Inter-provincial ===
Larkin also lined out with Leinster in the inter-provincial series of games, and enjoyed much success during a lengthy career. He was at right corner-back in 1972 as Leinster defeated Munster by 3–12 to 1–10 to take the Railway Cup.

Leinster dominated the championship during this era and, after missing the 1973 campaign, Larkin was back on the team in 1974. A 2–15 to 1–13 defeat of Munster gave him a second Railway Cup medal.

Munster fell by 2–9 to 1–11 in 1975, with Larkin collecting a third Railway Cup medal.

Six-in-a-row proved beyond Leinster, however, the team bounced back in 1977. A 2–17 to 1–13 defeat of archrivals Munster gave Larkin a fourth Railway Cup medal.

In 1979 Larkin, by now a veteran, was appointed captain of the team. A 1–13 to 1–9 defeat of Connacht gave him a fifth and final winner' medal, while he also had the honour of lifting the Railway Cup.

== Recognition ==
In 1973 Larkin was recognised as one of the best corner-backs of his era. The citation on his first All-Star that year read: "For his dependability in defence, which combines with his natural hurling skill to establish him as one of the great corner backs of today."

Eddie Keher, a contemporary of Larkin's, said of him: "Inch for inch and pound for pound, he was the best corner back I have ever seen or encountered.".

In 2000 Larkin received the ultimate honour when he was chosen at right corner-back on the Kilkenny Hurling Team of the Century.

== Personal life ==
Larkin was born in "the village" area of Kilkenny. His father, Paddy Larkin, was a member of the defence forces and was a four-time All-Ireland medallist with Kilkenny between 1932 and 1939. Larkin's uncle, Mick, won an All-Ireland medal as a non-playing substitute during the same era.

From an early age Larkin was known as "Fan", a nickname which was adopted to avoid confusion with his cousin who was also called Philip Larkin. To avoid confusion, his middle name of Francis was abbreviated to Fan.

After his education at Kilkenny City Vocational School, Larkin worked as a plasterer with Kilkenny Corporation.

Larkin's son, Philly Larkin, also played with Kilkenny and won All-Ireland medals in 2000, 2002 and 2003.

== Honours ==
=== Team ===
Clann na Gael

- Kilkenny Senior Football Championship (2): 1963, 1964
- Kilkenny Junior Football Championship (1): 1962

James Stephens

- All-Ireland Senior Club Hurling Championship (2): 1976 (c), 1982
- Leinster Senior Club Hurling Championship (2): 1975 (c), 1981
- Kilkenny Senior Hurling Championship (4): 1969, 1975 (c), 1976, 1981
- Kilkenny Senior Football Championship (1): 1976

Kilkenny

- All-Ireland Senior Hurling Championship (5): 1963, 1972, 1974, 1975, 1979
- Leinster Senior Hurling Championship (9): 1963, 1964, 1971, 1972, 1973, 1974, 1975, 1978, 1979
- National Hurling League (1): 1975–76
- Leinster Minor Hurling Championship (1): 1959

Leinster

- Railway Cup (5): 1972, 1974, 1975, 1977, 1979 (c)

=== Individual ===
Honours

- Kilkenny Hurling Team of the Century: Right corner-back
- The 125 greatest stars of the GAA: No. 45
- All-Star Awards (4): 1973, 1974, 1976, 1978

Sporting positions
Preceded by Nicky Orr	Kilkenny Senior Hurling Captain; 1976	Succeeded by Liam 'Chunky' O'Brien
Preceded by Pat Henderson; Eddie Keher	Kilkenny Senior Hurling Manager; 1980–1981	Succeeded by Pat Henderson
Achievements
Preceded by Jim Power (St Finbarr's)	All-Ireland Club SHC winning captain 1976	Succeeded by Martin O'Doherty (Glen Rovers)
Preceded by Charlie McCarthy (Munster)	Railway Cup Hurling Final winning captain 1979	Succeeded by Joe Connolly (Connacht)
