= Brendan Considine =

Personal information
- Native name: Breandán Mac Consaidín (Irish)
- Born: 21 February 1897 Ennis, County Clare, Ireland
- Died: 17 December 1983 (aged 86) Terenure, Dublin, Ireland
- Occupation: Chairman of ACC

Sport
- Sport: Hurling
- Position: Left corner-forward
Clubs
- Years: Club
- Ennis Dalcassians; Collegians
Inter-county
- Years: County
- 1914-1916 1917-1919 1920-1922 1923-1927 1928-1930: Clare; Dublin; Cork; Waterford; Clare
Inter-county titles
- Munster titles: 2
- Leinster titles: 2
- All-Irelands: 2
- NHL: 0

Brendan C. Considine (21 February 1897 – 17 December 1983) was an Irish hurler, Gaelic footballer, rugby player and boxer who played as a left corner-forward for the Clare, Dublin, Cork and Waterford senior teams. He first played for Clare in 1914 and was a regular inter-county hurler until his retirement in 1930.

Part of the famous Considine family that included his brothers Willie and Tull, Considine is regarded as one of Clare's greatest-ever hurlers. He won two All-Ireland winners' medals, winning his first as a seventeen-year-old in 1914 making him the youngest player ever to win an All-Ireland title. He also won two Munster hurling medals, two Leinster hurling medals and one Leinster football medal.

At club level Considine is a multiple county club championship medalist with Ennis Dalcassians and Collegians.
