= 1967 Munster Senior Club Hurling Championship =

- Dates: 24 March 1968 - 6 October 1968
- Teams: 7
- Champions: Newmarket-on-Fergus (1st title); Jim Cullinan (captain)
- Runners-up: Carrick Davins

Tournament statistics
- Matches played: 6
- Goals scored: 37 (6.17 per match)
- Points scored: 106 (17.67 per match)
- Top scorer(s): Mick Roche (1-16)

The 1967 Munster Senior Club Hurling Championship was the fourth staging of the Munster Senior Club Hurling Championship since its establishment by the Munster Council. The championship, which was open to the champion clubs of 1967, began on 24 March 1968 and ended on 6 October 1968.

On 6 October 1968, Newmarket-on-Fergus won the championship after a 3-09 to 2-07 defeat of Carrick Davins in the final at Seán Treacy Park. It was their first ever championship title.

== Results ==
=== First round ===
24 March 1968 First round	Castlegar	3-10 - 3-09	Kilmallock	Kenny Park, Athenry
	T Murphy 1-3, J Carr 1-1, P Glynn 1-0, J Connolly 0-3, M Connor 0-2, K Shanughnessy 0-1.		M Dowling 1-2, D McCarthy 1-1, J Naughten 1-1, N Hayes 0-3, F Birrane 0-2.

9 June 1968 First round	Newmarket-on-Fergus	3-08 - 4-04	Glen Rovers	Fr. Murphy Memorial Park, Newmarket
	J McNamara 2-0, P McNamara 1-0, G Lohan 0-3, P Cronin 0-3, J Melody 0-1, L Danagher 0-1.		P Harte 1-2, B Carroll 1-1, J Daly 1-1, J Young 1-0.

11 August 1968 First round	Carrick Davins	2-17 - 1-08	St Brendan's, Ardfert	Páirc Dáibhín, Carrick-on-Suir
	M Roche 1-5, PJ Ryan 1-2, T Waters 0-5, M Ryan 0-3, J Ryan 0-2.		B Lalor 0-5, J Horgan 1-0, W McGuire 0-2, J McGrath 0-1.

=== Semi-finals ===
8 September 1967 Semi-finals	Carrick Davins	5-13 - 4-07	Castlegar	Gaelic Grounds, Limerick
	T Walsh 2-0, T Ryan 1-3, M Roche 0-6, N Hassett 1-2, M Ryan 1-0, J Walsh 0-2.		J Carr 2-1, T Madden 1-1, J Cochrain 1-0, J Connolly 0-2, K O'Shaughnessy 0-2, P Flynn 0-1.	Referee: J Quaid (Limerick)

29 September 1968 Semi-final	Ballygunner	3-04 - 4-10	Newmarket-on-Fergus	Walsh Park, Waterford
	T Walsh 1-2, V Connors 1-1, M Connors 1-0, T Cummins 0-1.		M Arthur 2-0, P McNamara 1-2, T Melody 1-0, J McNamara 0-3, P O'Leary 0-2, V Arthur 0-1, L Danagher 0-1, P Cronin 0-1.

=== Finals ===
6 October 1968 Final	Carrick Davins	2-07 - 3-09	Newmarket-on-Fergus	Seán Treacy Park, Tipperary
	M Roche 0-5, M Hassett 1-0, J Ryan 1-0, PJ Ryan 0-2.		P O'Leary 1-1, J McNamara 1-1, L Danaher 0-4, M O'Leary 0-1, V Arthur 0-1, P McNamara 0-1.	Referee: J Quaid (Limerick)
