= 1968 Munster Senior Club Hurling Championship =

- Teams: 7
- Champions: Newmarket-on-Fergus (2nd title)
- Runners-up: Ballygunner

The 1968 Munster Senior Club Hurling Championship was the fifth staging of the Munster Senior Club Hurling Championship since its establishment by the Munster Council.

on 26 March 1972, Newmarket-on-Fergus won the championship after a 5-08 to 4-03 defeat of Ballygunner in the final at Walsh Park. It was their second championship title overall and their second title in succession.

== Results ==
=== Semi-finals ===
16 November 1969 First round	Ballygunner	3-04 - 2-04	Roscrea	Walsh Park

19 December 1971 Semi-final	St. Finbarr's	3-02 - 4-09	Newmarket-on-Fergus	Dr Mannix Sportsfield
	C McCarthy 1-0, Jimmy-Barry-Murphy 1-0, E Fitzpatrick 1-0, M Archer 0-1, C Murphy 0-1.		T Ryan 2-2, M Gilmartin 2-2, J McNamara 0-3, P McNamara 0-1, J Woods 0-1.

=== Final ===
26 March 1972 Final	Newmarket-on-Fergus	5-08 - 4-03	Ballygunner	Seán Treacy Park
	P McNamara 2-0, L Danaher 1-1, T Ryan 1-1, M O'Leary 1-1, J Gilmartin 0-3, P Woods 0-2.		C McCabe 2-0, W Ahern 1-0, M Connors 1-0, J Phelan 0-3.	Referee: D Nealon (Tipperary)
