= 1975–76 National Hurling League =

45th season of the National Hurling League

League details
- Dates: 5 October 1975 – 20 June 1976
- Teams: 20

League champions
- Winners: Kilkenny (4th win)
- Captain: Phil Larkin

Other division winners
- Division 2: Wicklow

The 1975–76 National Hurling League was the 45th season of the National Hurling League.

== Division 1 ==
National Hurling League Division 1
- Season: 1975-76
- Champions: Kilkenny; 4th National League title Captain: Phil Larkin
- Relegated: Westmeath
- Matches played: 51
- Top goalscorer: Eddie Keher (11-58)
- Biggest home win: Waterford 7-18 - 1-4 Laois (23 November 1975)
- Biggest away win: Limerick 5-14 - 0-7 Laois (30 November 1975)
- Highest scoring: Wexford 4-16 - 3-24 Clare (25 April 1976)
- All statistics correct as of 28 February 2017.

Galway came into the season as defending champions of the 1974-75 season. Westmeath entered Division 1 as the promoted team.

On 20 June 1976, Kilkenny won the title after a 6–14 to 1–14 win over Clare in the final. It was their 4th league title overall and their first since 1965-66.

Westmeath were relegated from Division 1 after just one season in the top flight. They were defeated by Antrim in a relegation play-off.

Kilkenny's Eddie Keher was the Division 1 top scorer with 11–58.

=== Structure ===
The 14 teams in Division 1 were divided into two groups of seven teams named Division 1A and Division 1B. Each team played all the others in its group once. Two points were awarded for a win and one for a draw. The first two teams in Division 1A advanced to the league semi-finals. The third and fourth-placed teams in Division 1A joined the first two teams in Division 1B in the quarter-finals. The bottom-placed team in Division 1A was relegated to Division 1B with the Division 1B champion gaining promotion. The bottom-placed team in Division 1B was relegated to Division 2.

=== Division 1A table ===
| Pos | Team | Pld | W | D | L | Pts | Notes |
|---|---|---|---|---|---|---|---|
| 1 | Wexford | 6 | 4 | 0 | 2 | 8 | |
| 2 | Cork | 6 | 4 | 0 | 2 | 8 | |
| 3 | Clare | 6 | 3 | 1 | 2 | 7 | Division 1 runners-up |
| 4 | Kilkenny | 6 | 2 | 2 | 2 | 6 | Division 1 champions |
| 5 | Dublin | 6 | 1 | 3 | 2 | 5 | |
| 6 | Tipperary | 6 | 2 | 1 | 3 | 5 | |
| 7 | Galway | 6 | 1 | 1 | 4 | 2 | Relegated to Division 1B |

=== Group stage ===
| 5 October 1975 | Wexford | 3-10 - 1-14 | Galway | Páirc Uí Shíocháin, Gorey |
| | M Butler 1-1, N Buggy 1-0, T McCormack 1-0, T Doran 0-3, R Kinsella 0-3, M Quigley 0-2, J Quigley 0-1. | | G Coone 0-8, P Fahy 1-2, A Fenton 0-1, G Holland 0-1, PJ Molloy 0-1, S Grealish 0-1. | Referee: N Dalton (Waterford) |

| 5 October 1975 | Dublin | 2-9 - 1-12 | Clare | Croke Park, Dublin |
| | L Hennebry 0-6, J Towel 1-0, M Reidy 1-0, L Walsh 0-1, PJ Buckley 0-1, T Grealish 0-1. | | C Honan 0-6, B Gillegan 1-0, S Stack 0-2, T Kelly 0-1, J Callanan 0-1, E O'Connor 0-1, J McAllister 0-1. | Referee: M Gallagher (Kildare) |

| 5 October 1975 | Cork | 4-16 - 2-6 | Tipperary | The Mardyke, Cork |
| | B Cummins 2-0, P Moylan 0-5, E O'Donoghue 1-1, S O'Leary 1-1, M O'Doherty 0-4, J Fenton 0-3, D Coughlan 0-1, W Murphy 0-1. | | F Loughnane 1-2, A Fitzpatrick 1-0, M Butler 0-2, J Flanagan 0-1, J Dunlea 0-1. | Referee: J O'Grady (Limerick) |

| 19 October 1975 | Galway | 3-7 - 3-12 | Kilkenny | Duggan Park, Ballinasloe |
| | PJ Qualter 1-0, V Mullins 1-0, J Connolly 1-0, PJ Molloy 0-2, F Burke 0-2, P Fahy 0-1, S Murphy 0-1, J Grealish 0-1. | | E Keher 2-3, P Delaney 1-1, L O'Brien 0-3, K Purcell 0-2, M Brennan 0-1, P Henderson 0-1, G Henderson 0-1. | Referee: M Spain (Offaly) |

| 19 October 1975 | Tipperary | 1-8 - 2-8 | Wexford | Páirc Daibhín, Carrick-on-Suir |
| | T Butler 1-1, B Ryan 0-3, M Butler 0-1, F Loughnane 0-1, M Keating 0-1, S Hogan 0-1. | | T Doran 1-0, R Kinsella 1-0, J Murphy 0-3, M Butler 0-1, T Byrne 0-1, C Kehoe 0-1, M Quigley 0-1, J Quigley 0-1. | Referee: P Cronin (Cork) |

| 19 October 1975 | Clare | 0-9 - 2-10 | Cork | Cusack Park, Ennis |
| | C Honan 0-6, J Callanan 0-1, S Hehir 0-1, S Stack 0-1. | | P Moylan 0-6, S O'Leary 1-1, E O'Donoghue 1-1, W Murphy 0-1, J Horgan 0-1. | Referee: S O'Meara (Tipperary) |

| 2 November 1975 | Kilkenny | 1-12 - 2-9 | Tipperary | Nowlan Park, Kilkenny |
| | E Keher 1-6, M Brennan 0-2, K Purcell 0-2, M Ruth 0-1, G Henderson 0-1. | | J Ryan 0-5, T Butler 1-0, M Butler 1-0, J Kehoe 0-3, F Loughnane 0-1. | Referee: S O'Connor (Limerick) |

| 2 November 1975 | Wexford | 3-11 - 2-4 | Clare | Wexford Park, Wexford |
| | E Walsh 2-0, N Buggy 0-5, T Doran 1-0, T Byrne 0-2, J Murphy 0-2. | | T Ryan 1-0, C Woods 1-0, C Honan 0-3, J McNamara 0-1. | Referee: P Johnston (Kilkenny) |

| 2 November 1975 | Cork | 4-14 - 2-6 | Dublin | The Mardyke, Cork |
| | E O'Donoghue 2-2, R Cummins 2-0, P Moylan 0-4, B Óg Murphy 0-4, G McCarthy 0-3, J Rothwell 0-1. | | M Holden 1-0, J Towel 1-0, L Hennebry 0-2, P Carton 0-2, T Grealish 0-1, V Holden 0-1. | Referee: N Dalton (Westmeath) |

| 16 November 1975 | Tipperary | 4-5 - 1-5 | Galway | MacDonagh Park, Cloughjordan |
| | J Kehoe 2-0, F Loughnane 1-1, J Williams 1-0, J Ryan 0-2, S Hogan 0-1, Jimmy Ryan 0-1. | | G Coone 0-4, PJ Qualter 1-0, PJ Molloy 0-1. | Referee: J Rankins (Laois) |

| 16 November 1975 | Dublin | 5-7 - 2-7 | Wexford | Croke Park, Dublin |
| | J Towel 4-0, PJ Buckley 1-1, L Hennebry 0-4, M Reidy 0-2. | | E Walsh 2-0, N Buggy 0-5, T Doran 0-1, T Byrne 0-1. | Referee: P Byrnes (Gloucester) |

| 30 November 1975 | Dublin | 2-9 - 1-12 | Kilkenny | Croke Park, Dublin |
| | M Reidy 1-1, PJ Buckley 0-4, L Hennebry 0-4, J Towel 1-0. | | E Keher 0-6, M Brennan 1-1, M Ruth 0-3, K Purcell 0-1, F Larkin 0-1. |

| 30 November 1975 | Wexford | 3-7 - 1-10 | Cork | O'Kennedy Park, New Ross |
| | C Kehoe 1-1, N Buggy 0-4, E Walsh 1-0, T Doran 1-0, PJ Harris 0-1, T Byrne 0-1. | | E O'Donoghue 1-3, P Moylan 0-2, J Buckley 0-2, B Óg Murphy 0-1, J Horgan 0-1, M McDonnell 0-1. | Referee: P Johnston (Kilkenny) |

| 30 November 1975 | Galway | 3-6 - 3-11 | Clare | Pearse Stadium, Galway |
| | J Connolly 3-0, G Coone 0-4, PJ Qualter 0-1, A Fenton 0-1. | | C Honan 0-6, T Ryan 1-2, M Burke 1-1, J Callanan 1-0, N Casey 0-2. | Referee: M Spain (Offaly) |

| 7 December 1975 | Clare | 1-12 - 2-7 | Kilkenny | Dr. Daly Park, Tulla |
| | C Honan 1-0, T Ryan 0-3, C Woods 0-3, N Casey 0-3, M Burke 0-1, J McNamara 0-1, J Callanan 0-1. | | E Keher 1-3, P Henderson 1-0, M Ruth 0-2, B Fitzpatrick 0-1, M Brennan 0-1. | Referee: J O'Connor (Limerick) |

| 8 February 1976 | Kilkenny | 0-12 - 1-11 | Cork | Nowlan Park, Kilkenny |
| | E Keher 0-7, M Crotty 0-2, L O'Brien 0-1, M Ruth 0-1. | | E O'Donoghue 1-1, J Fenton 0-4, B Óg Murphy 0-2, C Roche 0-1, R Cummins 0-1, P Moylan 0-1, M O'Doherty 0-1. | Referee: S O'Meara (Tipperary) |

| 8 February 1976 | Clare | 0-9 - 0-3 | Tipperary | Dr. Daly Park, Tulla |
| | J Callanan 0-3, C Honan 0-2, P O'Connor 0-2, C Woods 0-1, M Moroney 0-1. | | F Loughnane 0-2, Jack Ryan 0-1. | Referee: S O'Connor (Limerick) |

| 8 February 1976 | Dublin | 2-8 - 2-8 | Galway | Croke Park, Dublin |
| | J Towell 2-0, Eamonn Flynn 0-4, M Holden 0-1, L Hennebry 0-1, D Keely 0-1, P Carton 0-1. | | P Fahy 2-0, G Coone 0-2, PJ Molloy 0-2, F Burke 0-2, S Grealish 0-1, S Murphy 0-1. | Referee: J Rankins (Laois) |

| 29 February 1976 | Tipperary | 1-12 - 1-6 | Dublin | Semple Stadium, Thurles |
| | F Loughnane 0-7, T Butler 1-1, B Ryan 0-1, S Power 0-1, S Hogan 0-1, J Grogan 0-1. | | E Flynn 1-4, P Carton 0-1, M Reidy 0-1. | Referee: P Johnston (Kilkenny) |

| 29 February 1976 | Wexford | 1-10 - 2-12 | Kilkenny | St. Patrick's Park, Enniscorthy |
| | N Buggy 0-5, T Doran 1-1, C Kehoe 0-3, J Murphy 0-1. | | E Keher 1-2, P Delaney 1-2, M Ruth 0-3, L O'Brien 0-2, M Brennan 0-1. | Referee: N Dalton (Waterford) |

| 29 February 1976 | Galway | 1-11 - 1-7 | Cork | Duggan Park, Ballinasloe |
| | PJ Molloy 1-1, G Cooney 0-3, I Clarke 0-2, F Burke 0-1, J Connolly 0-1, P Fahy 0-1, PJ Qualter 0-1, M Connolly 0-1. | | P Moylan 0-6, E O'Donoghue 1-0, J Fenton 0-1. | Referee: S O'Grady (Limerick) |

=== Division 1B table ===
| Pos | Team | Pld | W | D | L | Pts | Notes |
|---|---|---|---|---|---|---|---|
| 1 | Limerick | 6 | 6 | 0 | 0 | 12 | Promoted to Division 1A |
| 2 | Waterford | 6 | 5 | 0 | 1 | 10 | |
| 3 | Kildare | 6 | 3 | 0 | 3 | 6 | |
| 4 | Offaly | 6 | 3 | 0 | 3 | 6 | |
| 5 | Laois | 6 | 2 | 0 | 4 | 4 | |
| 6 | Antrim | 6 | 1 | 0 | 5 | 2 | |
| 7 | Westmeath | 6 | 1 | 0 | 5 | 2 | Relegated to Division 2 |

=== Group stage ===
| 5 October 1975 | Kildare | 3-5 - 4-12 | Waterford | St. Conleth's Park, Newbridge |
| | J Walshe 1-2, T White 1-0, N Walsh 1-0, M Deely 0-2, P Frainey 0-1. | | T Reide 2-1, J Greene 1-3, P O'Grady 0-5, M Walsh 1-0, M Whelan 0-3. | Referee: J Rankins (Laois) |

| 5 October 1975 | Westmeath | 1-13 - 2-7 | Antrim | Cusack Park, Mullingar |
| | M Kilcoyne 1-2, W Shanley 0-2, G Whelan 0-2, T McIntyre 0-2, J Keary 0-1, S Allen 0-1, C Connaughton 0-1, M Flanagan 0-1, JJ Lynch 0-1. | | J O'Neill 1-4, V Denny 1-0, E Donnelly 0-3. | Referee: T Furlong (Dublin) |

| 19 October 1975 | Antrim | 1-7 - 3-12 | Limerick | Corrigan Park, Belfast |
| | E Donnelly 0-5, R McDonnell 1-1, P Boyle 0-1. | | L O'Donoghue 2-2, F Kelly 0-7, M Dowling 1-0, W Fitzmaurice 0-2, S Barry 0-1. | Referee: T Kearney (Dublin) |

| 19 October 1975 | Offaly | 4-13 - 4-11 | Westmeath | St. Brendan's Park, Birr |
| | P Delaney 1-4, M Cleere 1-2, J Cleary 1-2, P Burke 1-0, C Loughnane 0-2, B Coolahan 0-1, PJ Whelehan 0-1, J Kelly 0-1. | | M Flanagan 1-4, N Fitzsimons 1-0, P Curran 1-0, M Kilcoyne 1-0, JJ Lynch 0-2, G Whelan 0-2, T McIntyre 0-1, S Allen 0-1, M Fagan 0-1. |

| 2 November 1975 | Limerick | 3-13 - 1-5 | Offaly | Gaelic Grounds, Limerick |
| | P Kelly 1-8, E Cregan 2-2, M Dowling 0-2, T Ryan 0-1. | | P Horan 1-0, M Cleere 0-2, C Spain 0-1, D Hanniffy 0-1, C Loughnane 0-1. | Referee: J O'Meara (Tipperary) |

| 2 November 1975 | Waterford | 2-9 - 0-3 | Westmeath | Fraher Field, Dungarvan |
| | J Greene 1-1, J Galvin 1-0, T Reid 0-2, T Casey 0-2, M Walsh 0-1, P McGrath 0-1, J Walsh 0-1, M Whelan 0-1. | | M Kilcoyne 0-2, | Referee: P Cronin (Cork) |

| 2 November 1975 | Laois | 3-11 - 6-8 | Kildare | Swan Road, Durrow |
| | P Bates 3-4, P Dillon 0-2, J Galvin 0-2, M Dunphy 0-1, J Hanlon 0-1, G Lanham 0-1. | | E Walsh 3-0, J Walsh 1-6, J Winders 2-0, T White 0-2. | Referee: G Kirwan (Offaly) |

| 16 November 1975 | Limerick | 2-8 - 1-1 | Waterford | Gaelic Grounds, Limerick |
| | J Neenan 1-1, M Dowling 1-0, J McCarthy 0-2, P Kelly 0-2, E Cregan 0-1, S Foley 0-1, G Maloney 0-1. | | J Greene 1-0, J Galvin 0-1. | Referee: S O'Meara (Tipperary) |

| 16 November 1975 | Kildare | 4-11 - 1-8 | Westmeath | St. Conleth's Park, Newbridge |
| | J Walsh 1-7, T White 2-0, B Burke 1-0, P Dunny 0-1, F Deering 0-1, P Freeney 0-1, N Walsh 0-1. | | M Flanagan 0-4, D Smith 1-0, S Allen 0-1, W Shanley 0-1, N Healy 0-1, M Cosgrove 0-1. | Referee: J Hatton (Wicklow) |

| 16 November 1975 | Offaly | 1-9 - 3-7 | Antrim | St. Brendan's Park, Birr |
| | P Delaney 0-4, C Spain 1-0, M Cleere 0-2, PJ Whelehan 0-1, J Kelly 0-1, P Horan 0-1. | | E Donnelly 1-4, R McDonnell 1-1, A Thornberry 1-0, P Boyle 0-1, J O'Neill 0-1. |

| 23 November 1975 | Waterford | 7-18 - 1-4 | Laois | Walsh Park, Waterford |
| | J Galvin 1-8, J Greene 3-1, T Reide 1-3, M Ormonde 1-1, M Whelan 1-0, D Heffernan 0-2, B Dineen 0-1, L Power 0-1, P McGrath 0-1. | | M Cuddy 1-0, G Lanham 0-2, P Bates 0-2. | Referee: D O'Connor (Cork) |

| 30 November 1975 | Waterford | 2-11 - 2-8 | Offaly | Walsh Park, Waterford |
| | J Galvin 1-4, M Walsh 0-4, M Whelan 1-0, P Kelly 0-2, B Dineen 0-1. | | PJ Whelehan 2-1, P Delaney 0-4, C Loughnane 0-1, D Hanniffy 0-1, C Spain 0-1. |

| 30 November 1975 | Laois | 0-7 - 5-14 | Limerick | O'Moore Park, Portlaoise |
| | P Dillon 0-2, J Hanlon 0-1, G Lanham 0-1, M Brophy 0-1, T Breen 0-1, M Walsh 0-1. | | M Dowling 2-0, J McCarthy 1-3, B Barry 0-6, G Moloney 1-1, E Cregan 1-0, L O'Donoghue 0-2. |

| 30 November 1975 | Kildare | 3-9 - 0-7 | Antrim | Geraldine Park, Athy |
| | J Walsh 0-5, P White 1-1, N Walshe 1-0, G Tiernan 1-0, N Deely 0-2, B Burke 0-1. | | S Ward 0-4, C Ward 0-1, J O'Neill 0-1, R McDonnell 0-1. | Referee: R Dowling (Kilkenny) |

| 8 February 1976 | Limerick | 4-9 - 1-7 | Kildare | Gaelic Grounds, Limerick |
| | E Cregan 2-0, G Moloney 1-2, L O'Donoghue 1-1, J McCarthy 0-2, E Grimes 0-2, P Kelly 0-1, P Fitzmaurice 0-1. | | M Moore 1-1, J Walsh 0-2, J O'Connor 0-1, R White 0-1, M Delea 0-1, Tommy Carew 0-1. | Referee: D Killeen (Galway) |

| 8 February 1976 | Westmeath | 2-9 - 3-7 | Laois | Cusack Park, Mullingar |
| | M Flanagan 1-1, P Curran 1-1, M Fagan 0-3, M Coyne 0-1, M Cosgrove 0-1, Gerry Whelan 0-1, S Allen 0-1. | | M Brophy 1-2, M Walsh 1-1, P Dowling 1-0, P Dillon 0-2, P King 0-1, P Kelly 0-1. | Referee: M Spain (Offaly) |

| 8 February 1976 | Antrim | 1-5 - 3-7 | Waterford | Corrigan Park, Belfast |
| | M Brunty 1-2, E Donnelly 0-1, J Fagan 0-1, M McKillop 0-1. | | T Reide 2-0, M Whelan 0-6, B Ormonde 1-0, B Knox 0-1. |

| 29 February 1976 | Antrim | 3-11 - 5-9 | Laois | Corrigan Park, Belfast |
| | E Donnelly 1-3, P Boyle 0-4, R McDonnell 1-0, A Hamill 1-0, P Growcott 0-1, S Ward 0-1, C Ward 0-1, J Fagan 0-1. | | M Aherne 2-0, P Dillon 0-5, M Cuddy 1-1, M Dunphy 1-0, P Kelly 1-0, P Dowling 0-1, D O'Loughlin 0-1, M Walsh 0-1. | Referee: S McGrattan (Down) |

| 29 February 1976 | Westmeath | 1-11 - 5-7 | Limerick | Cusack Park, Mullingar |
| | M Kilcoyne 1-3, M Fagan 0-4, G Whelan 0-2, D Fitzpatrick 0-1, M Cosgrove 0-1. | | E Cregan 3-1, L O'Donoghue 1-2, P Kelly 0-4, E Grimes 1-0. | Referee: M Kelleher (Kildare) |

| 29 February 1976 | Offaly | 4-9 - 1-9 | Kildare | St. Brendan's Park, Birr |
| | P Delaney 2-2, J Kelly 1-3, P Carroll 1-1, PJ Whelehan 0-3. | | T White 1-0, J Walsh 0-3, M Deely 0-2, D Walsh 0-2, S Butler 0-1, R Burke 0-1. | Referee: N Clarke (Westmeath) |

=== Play-off ===
| 7 March 1976 Play-off | Antrim | 4-7 - 2-9 | Westmeath | Páirc Mhuire, Ardee |
| | E Donnelly 1-2, E Dornin 1-1, R McDonnell 1-0, S Donnelly 1-0, J Fagan 0-2, A Thornbury 0-1, A Hamill 0-1. | | M Kilcoyne 2-1, M Fagan 0-6, P Curran 0-1, D Fitzpatrick 0-1. | Referee: N O'Donoghue (Dublin) |

=== Knock-out stage ===
Quarter-finals

| 21 March 1976 Quarter-final | Clare | 0-18 - 0-7 | Waterford | Semple Stadium, Thurles |
| | C Honan 0-8, J McNamara 0-5, N Casey 0-2, P O'Connor 0-1, C Woods 0-1, J Callanan 0-1. | | J Galvin 0-2, M Whelan 0-2, J Galvin 0-2, M Hickey 0-1. | Attendance: 13,470; Referee: S O'Grady (Limerick) |

| 21 March 1976 Quarter-final | Kilkenny | 4-13 - 3-10 | Limerick | Semple Stadium, Thurles |
| | E Keher 2-5, M Crotty 1-3, M Brennan 1-3, M Ruth 0-2. | | E Cregan 1-1, J Noonan 0-4, F Nolan 1-0, E Grimes 1-0, P Kelly 0-3, P Hartigan 0-1, L O'Donoghue 0-1. | Attendance: 13,470; Referee: N Dalton (Waterford) |

Semi-finals

| 4 April 1976 Semi-final | Cork | 2-11 - 3-8 | Kilkenny | Semple Stadium, Thurles |
| | S O'Leary 2-3, J Fenton 0-5, B Óg Murphy 0-2, J Horgan 0-1. | | E Keher 3-3, L O'Brien 0-3, M Brennan 0-1, M Crotty 0-1. | Attendance: 15,470; Referee: M Spain (Offaly) |

| 11 April 1976 Semi-final | Wexford | 2-9 - 3-6 | Clare | Semple Stadium, Thurles |
| | M Butler 1-3, C Kehoe 1-1, N Buggy 0-2, M Quigley 0-1, M Furlong 0-1, D Rowesome 0-1. | | T Crowe 1-1, M Moroney 1-1, N Casey 1-0, J McNamara 0-3, E O'Connor 0-1. | Attendance: 5,800; Referee: J Moloney (Tipperary) |

| 25 April 1976 Semi-final replay | Cork | 3-10 - 2-17 | Kilkenny | Semple Stadium, Thurles |
| | S O'Leary 2-1, J Fenton 1-2, B Óg Murphy 0-4, M Malone 0-1, E O'Donoghue 0-1, R Cummins 0-1. | | E Keher 0-9, M Brennan 1-4, P Delaney 1-1, F Cummins 0-1, G Henderson 0-1, L O'Brien 0-1. | Attendance: 30,246; Referee: M Spain (Offaly) |

| 25 April 1976 Semi-final replay | Wexford | 4-16 - 3-24 | Clare | Semple Stadium, Thurles |
| | N Buggy 1-11, M Butler 3-2, J Murphy 0-2, C Kehoe 0-1. | | J McNamara 0-8, C Honan 0-8, E O'Connor 1-2, N Casey 1-1, T Crowe 1-0, M Moroney 0-3, S Stack 0-1, J Callanan 0-1. | Attendance: 30,246; Referee: P Johnston (Kilkenny) |

Finals

| 9 May 1976 Final | Kilkenny | 0-16 - 2-10 | Clare | Semple Stadium, Thurles |
| | E Keher 0-7, M Brennan 0-3, B Fitzpatrick 0-2, P Henderson 0-1, L O'Brien 0-1, M Ruth 0-1. | | T Crowe 1-1, N Casey 1-0, C Honan 0-3, J McNamara 0-2, E O'Connor 0-2, C Woods 0-1, M Moroney 0-1. | Attendance: 26,350; Referee: F Murphy (Cork) |

| 20 June 1976 Final replay | Kilkenny | 6-14 - 1-14 | Clare | Semple Stadium, Thurles |
| | E Keher 1-7, P Delaney 3-0, M Brennan 1-5, B Fitzpatrick 1-1, M Ruth 0-1. | | J McNamara 0-5, N Casey 1-1, C Honan 0-3, M Moroney 0-2, J O'Gorman 0-2, J Callanan 0-1. | Attendance: 34,460; Referee: F Murphy (Cork) |

=== Scoring statistics ===
Top scorers overall

| Rank | Player | Team | Tally | Total | Matches | Average |
|---|---|---|---|---|---|---|
| 1 | Eddie Keher | Kilkenny | 11-58 | 91 | 11 | 8.27 |
| 2 | Colm Honan | Clare | 1-45 | 48 | 11 | 4.36 |
| 3 | Ned Buggy | Wexford | 2-32 | 38 | | |
| 4 | Mick Brennan | Kilkenny | 4-22 | 34 | | |
| 4 | Johnny Walsh | Kildare | 3-25 | 34 | | |
| 6 | Éamonn Cregan | Limerick | 9-05 | 32 | | |
| 7 | Éamonn O'Donoghue | Cork | 7-09 | 30 | | |
| 8 | Joe Towell | Dublin | 9-00 | 27 | | |
| 8 | Eddie Donnelly | Antrim | 3-18 | 27 | | |
| 10 | Jim McNamara | Clare | 0-25 | 25 | | |

Top scorers in a single game

| Rank | Player | Team | Tally | Total | Opposition |
|---|---|---|---|---|---|
| 1 | Ned Buggy | Wexford | 1-11 | 14 | Clare |
| 2 | Paddy Bates | Laois | 3-04 | 13 | Kildare |
| 3 | Joe Towell | Dublin | 4-00 | 12 | Wexford |
| 3 | Eddie Keher | Kilkenny | 3-03 | 12 | Cork |
| 5 | Mick Butler | Wexford | 3-02 | 11 | Clare |
| 5 | Eddie Keher | Kilkenny | 2-05 | 11 | Limerick |
| 5 | Paddy Kelly | Limerick | 1-08 | 11 | Offaly |
| 5 | John Galvin | Waterford | 1-08 | 11 | Laois |
| 9 | Jim Greene | Waterford | 3-01 | 10 | Laois |
| 9 | Éamonn Cregan | Limerick | 3-01 | 10 | Westmeath |
| 9 | Johnny Walsh | Kildare | 1-07 | 10 | Westmeath |
| 9 | Eddie Keher | Kilkenny | 1-07 | 10 | Clare |

== Division 2 ==
National Hurling League Division 2
- Season: 1975-76
- Champions: Wicklow
- Matches played: 16
- Biggest home win: Down 5-12 - 0-2 Kerry (2 November 1975)
- Biggest away win: Down 6-8 - 1-3 Carlow (19 October 1975)
- Highest scoring: Down 3-12 - 4-7 Meath (5 October 1975)
- All statistics correct as of 28 February 2017.

On 7 March 1976, Wicklow won the title after a 2–9 to 0–7 win over Down in a play-off.

=== Division 2 table ===
| Pos | Team | Pld | W | D | L | Pts | Notes |
|---|---|---|---|---|---|---|---|
| 1 | Wicklow | 5 | 4 | 0 | 1 | 8 | Division 2 champions |
| 2 | Down | 5 | 4 | 0 | 1 | 8 | |
| 3 | Meath | 5 | 3 | 0 | 2 | 6 | |
| 4 | Kerry | 5 | 3 | 0 | 2 | 6 | |
| 5 | Carlow | 5 | 1 | 0 | 4 | 2 | |
| 6 | Roscommon | 5 | 0 | 0 | 5 | 0 | |

=== Group stage ===
| 5 October 1975 | Down | 3-12 - 4-7 | Meath | St. Patrick's Park, Portaferry |

| 5 October 1975 | Roscommon | 1-7 - 5-8 | Kerry | Dr. Hyde Park, Roscommon |

| 19 October 1975 | Kerry | 3-7 - 1-6 | Wicklow |

| 19 October 1975 | Carlow | 1-3 - 6-8 | Down | Dr. Cullen Park, Carlow |

| 19 October 1975 | Meath | 1-16 - 2-5 | Roscommon |

| 2 November 1975 | Down | 5-12 - 0-2 | Kerry | McKenna Park, Ballycran |
| | J Martin 1-3, P Lennon 1-2, D Mullen 1-2, G McGrattan 1-0, M O'Flynn 1-0, W Coulter 0-2, C O'Flynn 0-1, B Mageean 0-1, P Brannif 0-1. | | F Donovan 0-2. |

| 2 November 1975 | Roscommon | 0-6 - 2-7 | Wicklow | Páirc Chiaráin, Athlone |
| | D Cox 0-1, M Finneran 0-1, F Carty 0-1, J Coyne 0-1, B Tansey 0-1, A Flaherty 0-1. | | J Glynn 1-2, T Glynn 1-0, T Kennedy 0-3, S Byrne 0-1, S Keogh 0-1. |

| 2 November 1975 | Meath | 4-13 - 1-7 | Carlow | Athboy |

| 8 February 1976 | Wicklow | 2-8 - 0-6 | Down | Aughrim County Ground, Aughrim |
| | G Byrne 2-0, T Glynn 0-4, J Reilly 0-1, T Kennedy 0-1. | | J Martin 0-4, M O'Flynn 0-2, W Coulter 0-1, C O'Flynn 0-1. |

| 8 February 1976 | Kerry | 0-7 - 2-6 | Meath | Austin Stack Park, Tralee |
| | P Moriarty 0-3, C Nolan 0-1, JM Brick 0-1, T Nolan 0-1, J O'Sullivan 0-1. | | B Maher 1-4, B Hayward 1-0, B Priest 0-1, M Martin 0-1. |

| 8 February 1976 | Carlow | 2-11 - 1-6 | Roscommon | Dr. Cullen Park, Carlow |
| | W Cullen 1-3, S Mullins 1-1, M Murphy 0-2, J O'Hara 0-1, P Kelly 0-1. | | B Tansey 0-4, S Kilroy 1-0, M Murphy 0-2. |

=== Play-off ===
| 7 March 1976 Play-off | Wicklow | 2-9 - 0-7 | Down | Páirc Mhuire, Ardee |
| | G Byrne 2-0, T Glynn 0-4, P Barry 0-3, T Kenny 0-2. | | J Martin 0-2, J Hughes 0-1, G McGrattan 0-1, P Hughes 0-1, B Mullen 0-1, D Mullen 0-1. | Referee: N O'Donoghue (Dublin) |
