= Tony Connolly =

Irish former sportsperson

Personal information
- Native name: Antoin Ó Conghaile (Irish)
- Born: 5 April 1941 (age 85) Blackrock, County Cork, Ireland
- Height: 5 ft 11 in (180 cm)

Sport
- Sport: Hurling
- Position: Midfield
Clubs
- Years: Club
- 1950s-1963 1964-1968: Blackrock; St Finbarr's
Club titles
- Cork titles: 3
- Munster titles: 1
Inter-county
Years	County	Apps (scores)
1966-1968	Cork	7 (1-0)
Inter-county titles
- Munster titles: 1
- All-Irelands: 1
- NHL: 0

Tony Connolly (born 5 April 1941 in Blackrock, County Cork, Ireland) is an Irish former sportsperson. He played hurling with his local clubs Blackrock and St Finbarr's and was a member at senior level of the Cork county team from 1960, interrupted by serious hand injury, returned 1966 until 1968, when six months suspension ended his career.

== Playing career ==
=== Club ===
Connolly began his club hurling career with the Blackrock club. In 1961 he won his first county senior championship title as 'the Rockies' defeated north Cork divisional side Avondhu by 4-10 to 3-7.

After a dispute with the Blackrock club Connolly left and joined the St Finbarr's club on the southside of Cork city. Here he had even more success, winning a second county title in 1965 following 'the Barr's' 6-8 to 2-5 defeat of UCC. The club later represented Cork in the provincial club series and even reached the final. A 3-12 to 2-3 defeat of Waterford's Mount Sion gave Connolly a Munster club winners' medal.

After St Finbarr's lost the 1967 county final to Glen Rovers, the club recovered to reach the championship decider again the following year. A remarkable 5-9 to 1-9 defeat of divisional side Imokilly gave Connolly a third county championship title.

=== Inter-county ===
Connolly made his return with the Cork senior hurling team in a Munster quarter-final against Clare in 1966. It was the beginning of a return to the big time for 'the Rebels' after a decade in the doldrums. That year Cork qualified for a Munster showdown with Waterford. An entertaining hour of hurling followed, however, victory went to Cork by 4-9 to 2-9 for the first time in ten years. It was Connolly's first senior Munster winners' medal. This victory allowed Cork to advance directly to the All-Ireland final where arch-rivals Kilkenny provided the opposition. It was the first meeting of these two great sides since 1947 and 'the Cats' were installed as the firm favourites. In spite of this a hat-trick of goals by Colm Sheehan gave Cork a merited 3-9 to 1-10 victory over an Eddie Keher-inspired Kilkenny. It was Connolly's first All-Ireland winners' medal.

Cork failed to retain their provincial and All-Ireland titles in 1967 while Tipperary trounced Cork by nine points in the Munster final a year later, a game missed through injury by Connolly. Connolly left the Cork team following this defeat.
