= Paddy Neary =

Irish hurler and referee

Personal information
- Native name: Pádraig Ó Náraigh (Irish)
- Born: 1956 (age 69–70) Kilkenny, Ireland
- Occupation: Teacher
- Height: 5 ft 11 in (180 cm)

Sport
- Sport: Hurling
- Position: Left corner-back
Club
- Years: Club
- James Stephens
Club titles
- Kilkenny titles: 3
- Leinster titles: 2
- All-Ireland Titles: 2
Inter-county
- Years: County
- 1976–1984: Kilkenny
Inter-county titles
- Leinster titles: 0
- All-Irelands: 0
- NHL: 1
- All Stars: 0

Paddy Neary (born 1956) is an Irish retired hurler and referee who played as a left corner-back for the Kilkenny senior team.

Neary joined the team during the 1975–76 National League and was a regular member of the team until his retirement from inter-county hurling almost a decade later. During that time he won one National Hurling League winners' medal. He also won two All-Ireland winners' medals as a non-playing substitute.

At club level Neary is a two-time All-Ireland medalist with James Stephens. In addition to this he has also won two Leinster winners' medals and three county club championship winners' medals.
