= Newmarket-on-Fergus GAA =

Gaelic games club in County Clare, Ireland

Newmarket-on-Fergus
- Cora Chaitlín
- Founded: 1885
- County: Clare
- Nickname: The Blues
- Colours
- Grounds: Father Murphy Memorial Park

Playing kits
Standard colours

Senior Club Championships
	All Ireland	Munster champions	Clare champions
Football:	-	-	2
Hurling:	-	2	23
Ladies' football:	–	0	1

Newmarket-on-Fergus GAA is a Gaelic Athletic Association club in Newmarket-on-Fergus, County Clare, Ireland. The club is affiliated to the Clare County Board and fields teams in both hurling and Gaelic football.

== History ==
Located in the town of Newmarket-on-Fergus, about 13km south of Ennis, Newmarket-on-Fergus GAA Club was founded in 1885. Early successes were in Gaelic football, with the club winning the inaugural Clare SFC in 1887, before retaining the title the following year. Since then, Newmarket-on-Fergus has been dominated by hurling, with the club winning their first Clare SHC title in 1912.

Since that initial success, the club has had several periods of championship dominance. Six Clare SHC titles were won between 1925 and 1936. A sharp decline followed, with the club's 1955 championship win being the only title success in a 25-year period.

Between 1963 and 1981, Newmarket-on-Fergus had their greatest era of success. 13 Clare SHC titles were won during that period, including a record four successive titles between 1971 and 1974. Newmarket-on-Fergus also became the first Clare club to win the Munster Club SHC title, when they claimed consecutive titles in 1967 and 1968.

The club faced a period of decline once again following this hugely successful era. The new century saw Newmarket-on-Fergus win a number of Clare MAHC and U21HC titles, while the club's second team won the Munster Club JHC title in 2003. After a lapse of 31 years, Newmarket-on-Fergus won their 23rd Clare SHC title after a 3–10 to 0–09 win over Cusheen in the 2012 final.

== Major Honours ==
=== Gaelic Football ===
- Clare Senior Football Championship (2): 1887, 1888

=== Hurling ===
- Munster Senior Club Hurling Championship (2): 1967, 1968
- Clare Senior Hurling Championship (23): 1912, 1916, 1925, 1926, 1927, 1930, 1931, 1936, 1955, 1963, 1964, 1965, 1967, 1968, 1969, 1971, 1972, 1973, 1974, 1976, 1978, 1981, 2012
- Clare Intermediate Hurling Championship (1): 1967
- Munster Junior Club Hurling Championship (1): 2003
- Clare Junior A Hurling Championship (5): 1926, 1972, 1998, 2003, 2011
- Clare Under-21 A Hurling Championship (7): 1967, 1968, 1970, 2001, 2004, 2005, 2006
- Clare Minor A Hurling Championship (6): 1961, 1968, 1998, 2002, 2007, 2010

=== Ladies Football ===
- Munster Senior Club Ladies Football Championship Runners-Up: 1991
- Clare Senior Ladies Football Championship (1): 1991
- Clare Intermediate Ladies Football Championship (3): 1997, 2001, 2010

== Notable players ==
- Jim Clancy: All-Ireland SHC–winner (1914)
- Jim Cullinan: National Hurling League–winner (1976–77)
- Bob Doherty: All-Ireland SHC–winner (1914, 1920, 1924)
- John Fox: All-Ireland SHC–winner (1914)
- Jim Guerin: All-Ireland SHC–winner (1914)
- Colin Ryan: All-Ireland SHC–winner (2013)
