= David Punch =

Limerick hurler

Personal information
- Born: 12 December 1956 (age 69) Patrickswell, County Limerick
- Occupation: Publican
- Height: 5 ft 7 in (170 cm)

Sport
- Sport: Hurling
- Position: Midfield
Club
- Years: Club
- 1970s–1990s: Patrickswell
Inter-county
- Years: County
- 1970s–1980s: Limerick
Inter-county titles
- Munster titles: 1
- All-Irelands: 0
- NHL: 0
- All Stars: 0

David Punch (born 12 December 1956) is an Irish former sportsman. Born in Patrickswell, County Limerick, Punch played hurling with his local club Patrickswell and the Limerick senior team in the 1970s and 1980s.
