= Tull Considine =

Irish hurler and Gaelic footballer

Personal information
- Native name: Traolach Mac Consaidín (Irish)
- Nickname: Tull
- Born: 5 October 1898 Ennis, County Clare, Ireland
- Died: 7 July 1980 (aged 81)

Sport
- Football Position: Left corner-forward
- Hurling Position: Left corner-forward
Club
- Years: Club
- Ennis Dalcassians
Club titles
	Football	Hurling
Clare titles	2	6
Inter-county
- Years: County
- 1918-1934: Cork
Inter-county titles
	Football	Hurling
Munster Titles	1	1
All-Ireland Titles	0	0
League titles	0	0

Turlough Owen "Tull" Considine (5 October 1898 – 7 July 1980) was an Irish hurler and Gaelic footballer who played for the Clare senior teams.

A talented dual player, Considine first played for the senior hurling team during the 1918 championship and was a regular on the inter-county scene until his retirement after the 1934 championship. During that time he won one Munster hurling medal. Considine was an All-Ireland runner-up on two occasions.

He also played football with Clare. Appearing in the 1917 All-Ireland Senior Football Championship Final where Clare lost out to Wexford.

At club level Considine played with the Ennis Dalcassians club and enjoyed much success. In a career that spanned three decades he won six county hurling championship medals and two county football championship medals.

Considine's brothers, Brendan and Willie, were All-Ireland medalists with Clare.

Sporting positions
Preceded by	Clare Senior Hurling Captain; 1930	Succeeded by
