= Munster Senior Club Hurling Championship =

- Current season or competition: 2026 Munster Senior Club Hurling Championship
- Irish: Craobh Iománaíochta Sinsir Mumhan na gClub
- Code: Hurling
- Founded: 1964; 62 years ago
- Region: Munster (GAA)
- Trophy: O'Neill Cup
- No. of teams: 5
- Title holders: Ballygunner (6th title)
- Most titles: Ballygunner (6 titles)
- Sponsors: Allied Irish Banks
- TV partner: TG4
- Motto: The toughest of them all
- Official website: Munster GAA

The Munster Senior Club Hurling Championship (Munster Club SHC), usually known simply as the Munster Club Championship, is an annual club hurling competition organised by the Munster Council of the Gaelic Athletic Association (GAA). It is one of the most prestigious hurling tournaments in Ireland and the most prestigious club competition in the province of Munster, played by the champion teams of the respective county club championships.

In its present format, the Munster Club Championship features five teams. The straight knockout series of games begins in October and culminates with the Munster final in late November or early December. The prize for the winning team is the O'Neill Cup. The winner of the Munster Club Championship automatically qualifies for the semi-final stage of the All-Ireland Club Championship.

Cork clubs have the most victories (18 wins), followed by Tipperary (13 wins) and Limerick, Clare and Waterford (10 wins each). Tipperary has the most winning teams, with nine clubs having won the title. The competition has been won by 28 clubs and 17 of them have won it more than once.

Ballygunner is the most successful club in the tournament's history, having won it six times. Ballygunner is the only club to have won it three times in-a-row. Ballygunner are the current Munster champions, having beaten Éire Óg, Inis 0–21 to 1–09 in the 2025 Munster final.

== History ==
=== Beginnings ===
Since the foundation of the Gaelic Athletic Association in 1884, challenge, exhibition and tournament matches between clubs on an inter-county level were commonplace. Throughout the 1930s and 1940s, Glen Rovers of Cork and Ahane of Limerick regularly clashed in off-season games. In the 1950s the Cork Churches Tournament came to be recognised as the unofficial All-Ireland Club Championship. The tournament was an initiative by the then Bishop of Cork and Ross, Cornelius Lucey, to raise money to build five new churches in the fast developing suburbs of Cork. Participation was by invitation and was extended to the country’s current best hurling teams. This tournament lasted for five years, however, by the 1960s there was a growing appetite for a similar competition. In 1965 the Munster Council organised the inaugural inter-county club championship, with participation limited to the 1964 champion hurling clubs of each county. The inaugural championship suffered lengthy delays, with the final taking place in 1966. Since then the title has been awarded every year.

=== Team changes ===
Due to a lack of meaningful competition in their own province, all Galway teams competed in the various Munster Championships between 1959 and 1969. The creation of the club championship saw the Galway champions participate for the Munster title for six seasons from 1964 until 1969.

The 2007 Munster Club Championship was the last time that the Kerry champions participated in the competition. Historically seen as the weakest of the team involved, the Kerry County Board decided to regrade and enter their senior champions in the Munster Intermediate Club Championship.

=== Team dominance ===
While Cork clubs Glen Rovers and St. Finbarr's, Togher won the first two championship titles, Newmarket-on-Fergus became the first team to retain the championship in 1968. Roscrea completed their own two-in-a-row in 1970, however, the rest of that decade was the preserve of Cork clubs as Blackrock, St. Finbarr's, Togher and Glen Rovers claimed every available championship title. Mount Sion of Waterford broke the decade-long hegemony in 1981 by becoming the first Waterford team to win the championship. Tipperary clubs were dominant throughout the rest of the 1980s, with Moycarkey-Borris, Kilruane MacDonaghs and Borris-Ileigh all winning the provincial decider. As the decade drew to a close and the 1990s began, Limerick clubs made their first impression with Ballybrown, Patrickswell and Kilmallock being added to the roll of honour. Clare clubs dominated between 1995 and 2000, with Sixmilebridge, Clarecastle, Wolfe Tones and St. Joseph's, Doora-Barefield reflecting the county's dominance at inter-county level by also claiming the club championship title. The new century saw Newtownshanrum and Toomevara win five titles between them between 2003 and 2009, however, Waterford clubs also enjoyed success. In the 2010s, the championship has been dominated by Limerick clubs, with Na Piarsaigh winning four titles in seven years. Between 2017 and 2025 Ballygunner from Waterford reached every final and won the championship 5 times including the first ever three-in-a-row.

== Format ==
=== Overview ===
The Munster Championship is a single elimination tournament. Each team is afforded only one defeat before being eliminated from the championship. Pairings for matches are drawn at random and there is no seeding.

Each match is played as a single leg. If a match is drawn there is a period of extra time, however, if both sides are still level at the end of extra time a replay takes place and so on until a winner is found.

=== Competition format ===
Quarter-final: Two teams contest this round. The winning team advances directly to the semi-final stage. The losing team is eliminated from the championship.

Semi-finals: Four teams contest this round. The two winning teams advance directly to the final. The two losing teams are eliminated from the championship.

Final: The final is contested by the two semi-final winners.

== Teams ==
=== Qualification ===
County	Championship	Qualifying team
Clare	Clare Senior Hurling Championship	Champions
Cork	Cork Premier Senior Hurling Championship	Champions*
Limerick	Limerick Senior Hurling Championship	Champions
Tipperary	Tipperary Senior Hurling Championship	Champions
Waterford	Waterford Senior Hurling Championship	Champions

*Or if the Championship is won by a divisional side, the club progressing furthest in the competition

=== 2025 teams ===
68 clubs will compete in the 2025 Munster Senior Club Hurling Championship:

County	No.	Clubs competing in county championship
Clare	16	Ballyea, Broadford, Clonlara, Clooney-Quin, Corofin, Cratloe, Crusheen, **Éire Óg Ennis**, Feakle, Inagh-Kilnamona, Kilmaley, Newmarket-on-Fergus, Scariff, Sixmilebridge, St. Joseph's Doora-Barefield, Wolfe Tones na Sionna
Cork	12	Blackrock, Charleville, Douglas, Erin's Own, Fr O'Neill's, Glen Rovers, Kanturk, Midleton, Newcestown, Newtownshandrum, **Sarsfields**, St Finbarr's
Limerick	12	Adare, Ahane, Ballybrown, Doon, Dromin/Athlacca, Kildimo-Pallaskenry, Kilmallock, Monaleen, Mungret/St. Paul's, **Na Piarsaigh**, Newcastle West, Patrickswell
Tipperary	16	Borris–Ileigh, Cashel King Cormacs, Clonoulty–Rossmore, Drom & Inch, Holycross–Ballycahill, JK Brackens, Kiladangan, Kilruane MacDonagh's, Lorrha–Dorrha, **Loughmore–Castleiney**, Moycarkey–Borris, Mullinahone, Nenagh Éire Óg, Roscrea, Thurles Sarsfields, Toomevara
Waterford	12	Abbeyside–Ballinacourty, **Ballygunner**, Brickey Rangers, Clonea, De La Salle, Dungarvan, Ferrybank, Fourmilewater, Lismore, Mount Sion, Passage, Roanmore

Note: Bold indicates title-holders.

== Trophy ==
At the end of the Munster final, the winning team is presented with a trophy. The cup, named the O'Neill Cup, is held by the winning team until the following year's final. Traditionally, the presentation is made at a special rostrum in the stand where GAA and political dignitaries and special guests view the match.

The cup is decorated with ribbons in the colours of the winning team. During the game the cup actually has both teams' sets of ribbons attached and the runners-up ribbons are removed before the presentation. The winning captain accepts the cup on behalf of his team before giving a short speech. Individual members of the winning team then have an opportunity to come to the rostrum to lift the cup.

The present trophy was donated by the Sarsfield's club in Cork in 1972 to commemorate Billy O'Neill who founded their club in 1903.

== Roll of honour ==
=== Performance by club ===
#	Team	County	Wins	Runners Up	Years won	Years runners up
1	Ballygunner	Waterford	6	10	2001, 2018, 2021, 2022, 2023, 2025	1966, 1968, 1996, 1999, 2005, 2009, 2015, 2017, 2019, 2024
2	Blackrock	Cork	5	2	1971, 1973, 1975, 1978, 1979	1985, 2001
3	Na Piarsaigh	Limerick	4	1	2011, 2013, 2015, 2017	2018
3	St. Finbarr's	Cork	4	0	1965, 1974, 1977, 1980	-
5	Sixmilebridge	Clare	3	6	1984, 1995, 2000	1977, 1989, 1992, 1993, 2002, 2013
5	Glen Rovers	Cork	3	2	1964, 1972, 1976	1969, 2016
5	Toomevara	Tipperary	3	2	1993, 2004, 2006	1994, 1998
5	Kilmallock	Limerick	3	1	1992, 1994, 2014	2021
5	Newtownshandrum	Cork	3	0	2003, 2005, 2009	-
10	Mount Sion	Waterford	2	6	1981, 2002	1964, 1965, 1975, 1988, 2000, 2004
10	Patrickswell	Limerick	2	4	1988, 1990	1982, 1984, 1997, 2003
10	Newmarket-on-Fergus	Clare	2	3	1967, 1968	1973, 1974, 1978
10	Roscrea	Tipperary	2	2	1969, 1970	1972, 1980
10	Borris-Ileigh	Tipperary	2	1	1986, 2019	1983
10	De La Salle	Waterford	2	1	2008, 2010	2012
10	Midleton	Cork	2	1	1983, 1987	1991
10	St. Joseph's, Doora-Barefield	Clare	2	0	1998, 1999	-
18	Clarecastle	Clare	1	2	1997	1970, 1986
18	Carrick Davins	Tipperary	1	1	1966	1967
18	Thurles Sarsfields	Tipperary	1	1	2012	2010
18	Ballyea	Clare	1	1	2016	2022
18	Moycarkey-Borris	Tipperary	1	0	1982	-
18	Kilruane MacDonaghs	Tipperary	1	0	1985	-
18	Ballybrown	Limerick	1	0	1989	-
18	Cashel King Cormacs	Tipperary	1	0	1991	-
18	Wolfe Tones, Shannon	Clare	1	0	1996	-
18	Loughmore-Castleiney	Tipperary	1	0	2007	-
18	Sarsfields	Cork	1	0	2024	-
29	South Liberties	Limerick	0	2	-	1976, 1981
29	Éire Óg, Ennis	Clare	0	2	-	1990, 2025
29	Moyne-Templetuohy	Tipperary	0	1	-	1971
29	Dunhill	Waterford	0	1	-	1979
29	Cappawhite	Tipperary	0	1	-	1987
29	Nenagh Eire Og	Tipperary	0	1	-	1995
29	Erins Own	Cork	0	1	-	2006
29	Tulla	Clare	0	1	-	2007
29	Adare	Limerick	0	1	-	2008
29	Crusheen	Clare	0	1	-	2011
29	Cratloe	Clare	0	1	-	2014
29	Clonlara	Clare	0	1	-	2023

=== Performance by county ===
County	Titles	Runners-up	Total
Cork	18	6	24
Tipperary	13	10	23
Clare	10	18	27
Limerick	10	9	19
Waterford	10	18	27

=== Winning clubs by county ===
#	County	Winners	Runners-Up	Winning Clubs	Runner-Up Clubs
1	Cork	18	6	Blackrock (5), St. Finbarr's, Togher (4), Glen Rovers (3), Newtownshandrum (3), Midleton (2), Sarsfields (1)	Blackrock (2), Glen Rovers (2), Midleton (1), Erin's Own (1)
2	Tipperary	13	10	Toomevara (3), Roscrea (2), Borris-Ileigh (2), Carrick Davins (1), Moycarkey-Borris (1), Kilruane McDonaghs (1), Cashel King Cormacs (1), Loughmore-Castleiney (1), Thurles Sarsfields (1)	Toomevara (2), Roscrea (2), Carrick Davins (1), Borris-Ileigh (1), Thurles Sarsfields (1), Moyne-Templetuohy (1), Cappawhite (1), Nenagh Éire Óg (1)
3	Clare	10	18	Sixmilebridge (3), Newmarket-on-Fergus (2), St. Joseph's, Doora-Barefield (2), Wolfe Tones, Shannon (1), Clarecastle (1), Ballyea (1)	Sixmilebridge (6), Newmarket-on-Fergus (3), Clarecastle (2), Éire Óg, Ennis (2), Tulla (1), Crusheen (1), Cratloe (1), Ballyea (1), Clonlara (1)
3	Limerick	10	9	Na Piarsaigh (4), Kilmallock (3), Patrickswell (2), Ballybrown (1)	Patrickswell (4), South Liberties (2), Adare (1), Na Piarsaigh (1), Kilmallock (1)
5	Waterford	10	18	Ballygunner (6), Mount Sion (2), De La Salle (2)	Ballygunner (10), Mount Sion (6), De La Salle (1), Dunhill (1)

== List of finals ==
=== Legend ===
All-Ireland champions
All-Ireland runners-up

=== List of Munster finals ===
Year	Winners			Runners-up			Stadium	Captain	#
Year	County	Club	Score	County	Club	Score	Stadium	Captain	#
2025	WAT	Ballygunner	0-21	CLA	Éire Óg, Ennis	1-09	Semple Stadium	Peter Hogan & Michael O'Mahony	
2024	COR	Sarsfields	3-20	WAT	Ballygunner	2-19	Semple Stadium	Conor O'Sullivan	
2023	WAT	Ballygunner	2-24	CLA	Clonlara	0-17	Semple Stadium	Pauric O'Mahony	
2022	WAT	Ballygunner	1-23	CLA	Ballyea	0-17	Semple Stadium	Pauric O'Mahony	
2021	WAT	Ballygunner	3-20	LIM	Kilmallock	1-12	Páirc Uí Chaoimh	Pauric O'Mahony	
2020		Cancelled due to the impact of the COVID-19 pandemic on Gaelic games							
2019	TIP	Borris-Ileigh	1-12	WAT	Ballygunner	1-11	Pairc Ui Rinn	Conor Kenny; Seán McCormack	
2018	WAT	Ballygunner	2-14	LIM	Na Piarsaigh	2-08	Semple Stadium	Stephen O'Keeffe; Shane O'Sullivan	
2017	LIM	Na Piarsaigh	3-15	WAT	Ballygunner	2-10	Semple Stadium	Cathal King	
2016	CLA	Ballyea	1-21	COR	Glen Rovers	2-10	Semple Stadium	Stan Lineen	
2015	LIM	Na Piarsaigh	2-18	WAT	Ballygunner	2-11	Semple Stadium	Cathal King	
2014	LIM	Kilmallock	1-32	CLA	Cratloe	3-18	Gaelic Grounds	Graeme Mulcahy	
2013	LIM	Na Piarsaigh	4-14	CLA	Sixmilebridge	0-08	Cusack Park	James O'Brien	
2012	TIP	Thurles Sarsfields	1-21	WAT	De La Salle	1-16	Páirc Uí Chaoimh	Pádraic Maher	
2011	LIM	Na Piarsaigh	1-13	CLA	Crusheen	0-09	Semple Stadium	Kieran Bermingham	
2010	WAT	De La Salle	0-09	TIP	Thurles Sarsfields	0-08	Páirc Uí Chaoimh	Ian O'Flynn	
2009	COR	Newtownshandrum	2-11	WAT	Ballygunner	2-09	Semple Stadium	Dermot Gleeson	
2008	WAT	De La Salle	1-09	LIM	Adare	0-10	Semple Stadium	John Mullane	
2007	TIP	Loughmore-Castleiney	1-06	CLA	Tulla	0-07	Gaelic Grounds	Johnny Gleeson	
2006	TIP	Toomevara	2-09	COR	Erin's Own	2-08	Gaelic Grounds	Tommy Dunne	
2005	COR	Newtownshandrum	0-16	WAT	Ballygunner	1-12	Semple Stadium	Brendan Mulcahy	
2004	TIP	Toomevara	1-14	WAT	Mount Sion	1-13	Semple Stadium	Paddy O'Brien	
2003	COR	Newtownshandrum	2-18	LIM	Patrickswell	2-09	Semple Stadium	John McCarthy	
2002	WAT	Mount Sion	0-12	CLA	Sixmilebridge	0-10	Semple Stadium	John Cleere	
2001	WAT	Ballygunner	2-14	COR	Blackrock	0-12	Semple Stadium	Billy O'Sullivan	
2000	CLA	Sixmilebridge	2-17	WAT	Mount Sion	3-08	Semple Stadium	Christy Chaplin	
1999	CLA	St. Joseph's, Doora-Barefield	4-09	WAT	Ballygunner	3-08	Semple Stadium	Ciarán O'Neill	
1998	CLA	St. Joseph's, Doora-Barefield	0-12	TIP	Toomevara	0-08	Gaelic Grounds	Lorcan Hassett	
1997	CLA	Clarecastle	2-11	LIM	Patrickswell	0-15	Semple Stadium	Martin Sheedy	
1996	CLA	Wolfe Tones, Shannon	4-09	WAT	Ballygunner	4-08	Semple Stadium	Brian Lohan	
1995	CLA	Sixmilebridge	2-18		Nenagh Éire Óg	1-07	Gaelic Grounds	Ian Mulready	
1994	LIM	Kilmallock	2-11	TIP	Toomevara	1-11	Semple Stadium	Mike Houlihan	
1993	TIP	Toomevara	0-15	CLA	Sixmilebridge	0-07	Gaelic Grounds	Jody Grace	
1992	LIM	Kilmallock	3-11	CLA	Sixmilebridge	2-11	Gaelic Grounds	Paddy Kelly	
1991	TIP	Cashel King Cormac's	0-09	COR	Midleton	0-06	Mitchelstown	Colm Bonnar	
1990	LIM	Patrickswell	0-08	CLA	Éire Óg, Ennis	0-06	Cusack Park	David Punch	
1989	LIM	Ballybrown	2-12	CLA	Sixmilebridge	1-08	Gaelic Grounds	Terence Kenny	
1988	LIM	Patrickswell	3-13	WAT	Mount Sion	2-13	Semple Stadium	David Punch	
1987	COR	Midleton	1-12	TIP	Cappawhite	1-11	FitzGerald Stadium	Ger Power	
1986	TIP	Borris-Ileigh	1-13	CLA	Clarecastle	1-09	Gaelic Grounds	Michael Ryan	
1985	TIP	Kilruane MacDonaghs	0-12	COR	Blackrock	0-06	Gaelic Grounds	Tony Sheppard	
1984	CLA	Sixmilebridge	4-10	LIM	Patrickswell	2-06	Semple Stadium	Seán Stack	
1983	COR	Midleton	1-14	TIP	Borris-Ileigh	1-11	FitzGerald Stadium	John Fenton	
1982	TIP	Moycarkey-Borris	1-09	LIM	Patrickswell	0-11	MacDonagh Park	Jack Bergin	
1981	WAT	Mount Sion	3-09	LIM	South Liberties	1-04	Walsh Park	Éamonn Kehoe	
1980	COR	St. Finbarr's	2-12	TIP	Roscrea	1-14	Páirc Mac Gearailt		
1979	COR	Blackrock	0-13	WAT	Dunhill	1-08	Páirc Uí Chaoimh		
1978	COR	Blackrock	3-08	CLA	Newmarket-on-Fergus	1-08	Páirc Uí Chaoimh	John Horgan	
1977	COR	St. Finbarr's	2-08	CLA	Sixmilebridge	0-06	Seán Treacy Park	Denis Burns	
1976	COR	Glen Rovers	2-08	LIM	South Liberties	2-04	Gaelic Grounds	Martin O'Doherty	
1975	COR	Blackrock	8-12	WAT	Mount Sion	3-08	Emly	John Horgan	
1974	COR	St. Finbarr's	0-07	CLA	Newmarket-on-Fergus	0-03	Gaelic Grounds	Jim Power	
1973	COR	Blackrock	1-13	CLA	Newmarket-on-Fergus	0-14	Bruff	John Horgan	
1972	COR	Glen Rovers	2-09	TIP	Roscrea	1-10	Gaelic Grounds	Denis Coughlan	
1971	COR	Blackrock	4-10	TIP	Moyne-Templetuohy	3-01	FitzGerald Stadium	John Horgan	
1970	TIP	Roscrea	4-11	CLA	Clarecastle	1-06	Gaelic Grounds	Donie Moloney	
1969	TIP	Roscrea	3-06	COR	Glen Rovers	1-09		Patsy Rowland	
1968	CLA	Newmarket-on-Fergus	5-08	WAT	Ballygunner	4-03			
1967	CLA	Newmarket-on-Fergus	3-09	TIP	Carrick Davins	2-07	Gaelic Grounds	Jim Cullinan	
1966	TIP	Carrick Davins	2-17	WAT	Ballygunner	1-11	Cusack Park		
1965	COR	St. Finbarr's	3-12	WAT	Mount Sion	2-03	Gaelic Grounds		
1964	COR	Glen Rovers	3-07	WAT	Mount Sion	1-07	Gaelic Grounds	Christy Ring	

=== Notes ===
- 1964 – The first match was abandoned: Glen Rovers 3-6, Mount Sion 2-6.
- 1977 – The first match ended in a draw: St. Finbarr's 3-5, Sixmilebridge 3-5.
- 1983 – The first match ended in a draw: Midleton 1-12, Borris-Ileigh 3-6.
- 1985 – The first match ended in a draw: Kilruane MacDonaghs 1-8, Blackrock 1-8.
- 2011 – The first match ended in a draw: Na Piarsaigh 1-11, Crusheen 0-14.

== Records and statistics ==
=== Final ===
==== Team ====
- Most wins: 6:
  - Ballygunner (2001, 2018, 2021, 2022, 2023, 2025)
- Most consecutive wins: 3:
  - Ballygunner (2021, 2022, 2023)
- Most appearances in a final: 16:
  - Ballygunner (1966, 1968, 1996, 1999, 2001, 2005, 2009, 2015, 2017, 2018, 2019, 2021, 2022, 2023, 2024, 2025)
- Most appearances in a final without ever winning: 2
  - South Liberties (1976, 1981), Éire Óg, Ennis (1990, 2025)
- Most appearances in a final without losing (streak): 5
  - Blackrock (1971, 1973, 1975, 1978, 1979)
- Biggest win: 19 points
  - Blackrock 8-12 – 3-08 Mount Sion, (1975)
- Most final defeats: 10
  - Ballygunner (1966, 1968, 1996, 1999, 2005, 2009, 2015, 2017, 2019, 2024)

=== Teams ===
==== County representatives ====
Year	Clare	Cork	Galway	Kerry	Limerick	Tipperary	Waterford
1964	Newmarket-on-Fergus	Glen Rovers	Turloughmore	Kilmoyley	Cappamore	Thurles Sarsfields	Mount Sion
1965	Newmarket-on-Fergus	St. Finbarr's	Turloughmore	Ballyduff	Patrickswell	Thurles Sarsfields	Mount Sion
1966	Éire Óg, Ennis	Avondhu	Turloughmore	Ballyduff	Patrickswell	Carrick Davins	Ballygunner
1967	Newmarket-on-Fergus	Glen Rovers	Castlegar	St. Brendan's	Kilmallock	Carrick Davins	Ballygunner
1968	Newmarket-on-Fergus	St. Finbarr's	Liam Mellows	Crotta O'Neill's	Claughaun	Roscrea	Ballygunner
1969	Newmarket-on-Fergus	Glen Rovers	Castlegar	Killarney	Patrickswell	Roscrea	Mount Sion
1970	Clarecastle	University College Cork	N/A	Kilmoyley	Patrickswell	Roscrea	Ballyduff-Portlaw
1971	Newmarket-on-Fergus	Blackrock	N/A	Kilmoyley	Claughaun	Moyne-Templetuohy	Portlaw
1972	Newmarket-on-Fergus	Glen Rovers	N/A	Ballyduff	South Liberties	Roscrea	Mount Sion
1973	Newmarket-on-Fergus	Blackrock	N/A	Ballyduff	Kilmallock	Roscrea	Portlaw
1974	Newmarket-on-Fergus	St. Finbarr's	N/A	Abbeydorney	Kilmallock	Thurles Sarsfields	Mount Sion
1975	Éire Óg, Ennis	Blackrock	N/A	St. Brendan's	Kilmallock	Moneygall	Mount Sion
1976	Newmarket-on-Fergus	Glen Rovers	N/A	Ballyduff	South Liberties	Moneygall	Portlaw
1977	Sixmilebridge	St. Finbarr's	N/A	Ballyduff	Patrickswell	Kilruane MacDonagh's	Portlaw
1978	Newmarket-on-Fergus	Blackrock	N/A	Ballyduff	South Liberties	Kilruane MacDonagh's	Dunhill
1979	Sixmilebridge	Blackrock	N/A	Causeway	Patrickswell	Kilruane MacDonagh's	Dunhill
1980	Newmarket-on-Fergus	St. Finbarr's	N/A	Causeway	Killeedy	Roscrea	Tallow
1981	Newmarket-on-Fergus	St. Finbarr's	N/A	Causeway	South Liberties	Borris-Ileigh	Mount Sion
1982	Éire Óg, Ennis	St. Finbarr's	N/A	Causeway	Patrickswell	Moycarkey-Borris	Ballyduff Upper
1983	Sixmilebridge	Midleton	N/A	Lixnaw	Patrickswell	Borris-Ileigh	Mount Sion
1984	Sixmilebridge	St. Finbarr's	N/A	Ballyduff	Patrickswell	Moycarkey-Borris	Tallow
1985	Kilmaley	Blackrock	N/A	Lixnaw	Kilmallock	Kilruane MacDonagh's	Tallow
1986	Clarecastle	Midleton	N/A	St. Brendan's	Claughaun	Borris-Ileigh	Mount Sion
1987	Clarecastle	Midleton	N/A	Causeway	Patrickswell	Cappawhite	Ballyduff Upper
1988	Feakle	St. Finbarr's	N/A	Ballyduff	Patrickswell	Loughmore-Castleiney	Mount Sion
1989	Sixmilebridge	Glen Rovers	N/A	Ballyduff	Ballybrown	Clonoulty-Rossmore	Roanmore
1990	Éire Óg, Ennis	Na Piarsaigh	N/A	St. Brendan's	Patrickswell	Holycross-Ballycahill	Roanmore
1991	Clarecastle	Midleton	N/A	Ballyduff	Ballybrown	Cashel King Cormacs	Lismore
1992	Sixmilebridge	Erin's Own	N/A	Ballyheigue	Kilmallock	Toomevara	Ballygunner
1993	Sixmilebridge	St. Finbarr's	N/A	Ballyduff	Patrickswell	Toomevara	Lismore
1994	Clarecastle	Midleton	N/A	Ballyduff	Kilmallock	Toomevara	Mount Sion
1995	Sixmilebridge	Na Piarsaigh	N/A	Ballyduff	Patrickswell	Nenagh Éire Óg	Ballygunner
1996	Wolfe Tones, Shannon	Na Piarsaigh	N/A	Ballyheigue	Patrickswell	Boherlahan-Dualla	Ballygunner
1997	Clarecastle	Sarsfields	N/A	Ballyheigue	Patrickswell	Clonoulty-Rossmore	Ballygunner
1998	St. Joseph's, Doora-Barefield	Blackrock	N/A	Causeway	Ahane	Toomevara	Mount Sion
1999	St. Joseph's, Doora-Barefield	Blackrock	N/A	Lixnaw	Ahane	Toomevara	Ballygunner
2000	Sixmilebridge	Newtownshandrum	N/A	Ballyduff	Patrickswell	Toomevara	Mount Sion
2001	St. Joseph's, Doora-Barefield	Blackrock	N/A	Kilmoyley	Adare	Toomevara	Ballygunner
2002	Sixmilebridge	Blackrock	N/A	Kilmoyley	Adare	Mullinahone	Mount Sion
2003	Clarecastle	Newtownshandrum	N/A	Kilmoyley	Patrickswell	Toomevara	Mount Sion
2004	Kilmaley	Na Piarsaigh	N/A	Kilmoyley	Ahane	Toomevara	Mount Sion
2005	Clarecastle	Newtownshandrum	N/A	Lixnaw	Garryspillane	Thurles Sarsfields	Ballygunner
2006	Wolfe Tones, Shannon	Erin's Own	N/A	Ballyduff	Bruree	Toomevara	Mount Sion
2007	Tulla	Erin's Own	N/A	Lixnaw	Adare	Loughmore-Castleiney	Ballyduff Upper
2008	Clonlara	Sarsfields	N/A	N/A	Adare	Toomevara	De La Salle
2009	Cratloe	Newtownshandrum	N/A	N/A	Adare	Thurles Sarsfields	Ballygunner
2010	Crusheen	Sarsfields	N/A	N/A	Kilmallock	Thurles Sarsfields	De La Salle
2011	Crusheen	Carrigtwohill	N/A	N/A	Na Piarsaigh	Drom-Inch	Ballygunner
2012	Newmarket-on-Fergus	Sarsfields	N/A	N/A	Kilmallock	Thurles Sarsfields	De La Salle
2013	Sixmilebridge	Midleton	N/A	N/A	Na Piarsaigh	Loughmore-Castleiney	Passage
2014	Cratloe	Sarsfields	N/A	N/A	Kilmallock	Thurles Sarsfields	Ballygunner
2015	Sixmilebridge	Glen Rovers	N/A	N/A	Na Piarsaigh	Thurles Sarsfields	Ballygunner
2016	Ballyea	Glen Rovers	N/A	N/A	Patrickswell	Thurles Sarsfields	Ballygunner
2017	Sixmilebridge	Blackrock	N/A	N/A	Na Piarsaigh	Thurles Sarsfields	Ballygunner
2018	Ballyea	Midleton	N/A	N/A	Na Piarsaigh	Clonoulty-Rossmore	Ballygunner
2019	Sixmilebridge	Glen Rovers	N/A	N/A	Patrickswell	Borris-Ileigh	Ballygunner
2020	NO CHAMPIONSHIP						
2021	Ballyea	Midleton	N/A	N/A	Kilmallock	Loughmore-Castleiney	Ballygunner
2022	Ballyea	St. Finbarr's	N/A	N/A	Na Piarsaigh	Kilruane MacDonagh's	Ballygunner
2023	Clonlara	Sarsfields	N/A	N/A	Na Piarsaigh	Kiladangan	Ballygunner
2024	Feakle	Sarsfields	N/A	N/A	Doon	Loughmore-Castleiney	Ballygunner
2025	Éire Óg	Sarsfields	N/A	N/A	Na Piarsaigh	Loughmore–Castleiney	Ballygunner
2026	Inagh–Kilnamona	Glen Rovers	N/A	N/A	Kilmallock	Thurles Sarsfields	Ballygunner

==== By decade ====
The most successful team of each decade, judged by number of Munster Championship titles, is as follows:

- 1960s: Two titles for Newmarket-on-Fergus (1967, 1968)
- 1970s: Five titles for Blackrock (1971, 1973, 1975, 1978, 1979)
- 1980s: Two titles for Midleton (1983, 1987)
- 1990s: Two titles each for Kilmallock (1992, 1994), and St. Joseph's, Doora-Barefield (1998, 1999)
- 2000s: Three titles for Newtownshandrum (2003, 2005, 2009)
- 2010s: Four titles for Na Piarsaigh (2011, 2013, 2015, 2017)
- 2020s: Four titles for Ballygunner (2021, 2022, 2023, 2025)

==== Successful defending ====
Only 5 teams of the 27 who have won the championship have ever successfully defended the title. These are:

- Newmarket-on-Fergus in 1 attempt out of 2 (1968)
- Roscrea in 1 attempt out of 2 (1970)
- Blackrock on 1 attempt out of 5 (1979)
- St. Joseph's, Doora-Barefield on 1 attempt out of 2 (1999)
- Ballygunner on 2 attempts out of 5 (2022, 2023)

==== Barren spells ====
Top five longest gaps between successive championship titles:

- 33 years: Borris-Ileigh (1986-2019)
- 21 years: Mount Sion (1981–2002)
- 20 years: Kilmallock (1994–2014)
- 17 years: Ballygunner (2001-2018)
- 11 years: Sixmilebridge (1984–1995)
- 11 years: Toomevara (1993–2004)

==== Biggest wins ====
The most one-sided games from all stages of the championship:

- 30 points – 1974: Kilmallock 6-16 (34) – (4) 0-04 Abbeydorney
- 30 points – 1975: Mount Sion 8-13 (37) – (7) 1-04 St. Brendan's, Ardfert
- 29 points – 1991: Lismore 5-18 (33) – (4) 0-04 Ballyduff

The most one-sided Munster finals:

- 19 points – 1975: Blackrock 8-12 (36) – (17) 3-08 Mount Sion
- 18 points – 2013: Na Piarsaigh 4-14 (26) – (8) 0-08 Sixmilebridge
- 14 points – 2021: Ballygunner 3-20 (29) – (15) 1-12 Kilmallock
- 14 points – 1995: Sixmilebridge 2-18 (24) – (10) 1-07 Nenagh Éire Óg
- 14 points – 1970: Roscrea 4-11 (23) – (9) 1-06 Clarecastle
- 13 points – 2023: Ballygunner 2-24 (30) – (17) 0-17 Clonlara
- 12 points – 1971: Blackrock 4-10 (22) – (10) 3-01 Moyne-Templetuohy
- 12 points – 1965: St. Finbarr's, Togher 3-12 (21) – (9) 2-03 Mount Sion

=== Top scorers ===
==== Overall ====
Year	Top scorer	Team	Score	Total
1970	Joe Tynan	Roscrea	5-05	20
1971	Pat Moylan	Blackrock	3-23	32
1972	Francis Loughnane	Roscrea	1-17	20
1973	Tim Ryan	Newmarket-on-Fergus	6-20	38
1974	Jimmy Barry-Murphy	St. Finbarr's, Togher	4-07	19
1975	Ray Cummins	Blackrock	4-04	16
1976	Tom Ryan	South Liberties	2-04	10
1976	Éamonn Grimes	South Liberties	1-07	10
1976	Tim Ryan	Newmarket-on-Fergus	1-07	10
1977	Charlie McCarthy	St. Finbarr's, Togher	3-07	16
1978	Seán O'Meara	Kilruane MacDonagh's	2-08	14
1979	John Grogan	Dunhill	4-05	17
1980	John Cremin	St. Finbarr's, Togher	0-17	17
1981	Jim Greene	Mount Sion	2-18	24
1982	Richie Bennis	Patrickswell	2-15	21
1983	John Fenton	Midleton	1-21	24
1984	Gerry McInerney	Sixmilebridge	3-13	22
1985	Finbarr Delaney	Blackrock	3-16	25
1986	Leo O'Connor	Claughaun	2-16	22
1987	John Fenton	Midleton	0-17	17
1988	Gary Kirby	Patrickswell	2-20	26
1989	John Buckley	Glen Rovers	2-03	9
1989	Gerry McInerney	Sixmilebridge	1-06	9
1989	Christy Keyes	Ballybrown	1-06	9
1990	Declan Coote	Éire Óg, Ennis	1-13	16
1991	Tommy Grogan	Cashel King Cormacs	1-13	16
1992	Paddy Kelly	Kilmallock	4-17	29
1993	Mike Nolan	Toomevara	1-25	28
1994	Ger Manley	Midleton	3-16	25
1995	Gary Kirby	Patrickswell	2-21	27
1996	Paul Flynn	Ballygunner	3-21	30
1997	Gary Kirby	Patrickswell	1-29	32
1998	Tommy Dunne	Toomevara	1-13	16
1999	Paul Flynn	Ballygunner	1-17	20
2000	Gary Kirby	Patrickswell	1-19	22
2001	Paul Flynn	Ballygunner	1-38	23
2002	Ken McGrath	Mount Sion	0-26	26
2003	Paul O'Grady	Patrickswell	0-17	17
2004	Ken McGrath	Mount Sion	2-15	21
2005	Paul Flynn	Ballygunner	4-11	23
2006	Ken Dunne	Toomevara	1-14	17
2007	Aidan Lynch	Tulla	1-14	17
2008	Pat Ryan	Sarsfields	0-20	20
2009	Ben O'Connor	Newtownshandrum	0-23	23
2010	John Mullane	De La Salle	0-10	10
2011	Shane Dowling	Na Piarsaigh	3-14	23
2012	Pa Bourke	Thurles Sarsfields	1-19	22
2013	Shane Dowling	Na Piarsaigh	0-15	15
2014	Conor McGrath	Cratloe	3-21	30
2015	Shane Dowling	Na Piarsaigh	1-16	19
2016	Tony Kelly	Ballyea	1-15	18
2017	Pauric Mahony	Ballygunner	1-24	27
2018	Pauric Mahony	Ballygunner	1-32	35
2019	Pauric Mahony	Ballygunner	0-20	20
2020	No championship			
2021	Pauric Mahony	Ballygunner	0-17	17
2022	Pauric Mahony	Ballygunner	0-29	29
2023	Pauric Mahony	Ballygunner	0-28	28
2024	Pauric Mahony	Ballygunner	1-28	31

==== Single game ====
Year	Top scorer	Team	Opposition	Score	Total
1970	Joe Tynan	Roscrea	Ballyduff-Portlaw	2-02	8
1970	Francis Loughnane	Roscrea	Clarecastle	1-05	8
1971	Pat Moylan	Blackrock	Claughaun	1-09	12
1971	Pat Moylan	Blackrock	Newmarket-on-Fergus	1-09	12
1972	Francis Loughnane	Roscrea	Mount Sions	1-10	13
1973	Tom Ryan	Newmarket-on-Fergus	Portlaw	4-07	19
1974	Tom Smith	Kilmallock	Abbeydorney	1-08	11
1975	Jim Greene	Mount Sion	St. Brendan's	3-06	15
1976	Donal Kennedy	Moneygall	Newmarket-on-Fergus	2-02	8
1977	Jimmy Barry-Murphy	St. Finbarr's	Portlaw	4-01	13
1978	Éamonn Grimes	South Liberties	Kilruane MacDonagh's	1-06	9
1978	Tom Casey	Dunhill	Newmarket-on-Fergus	1-06	9
1979	John Hogan	Dunhill	Causeway	3-02	11
1980	John Cremin	St. Finbarr's	Causeway	0-10	10
1981	Noel O'Dwyer	Borris-Ileigh	Mount Sion	0-10	10
1982	Richie Bennis	Patrickswell	Causeway	1-06	9
1983	John Fenton	Midleton	Borris-Ileigh	1-01	13
1984	Gerry McInerney	Sixmilebridge	St. Finbarr's	2-06	12
1985	Finbarr Delaney	Blackrock	Kilmallock	2-0 8	14
1986	Leo O'Connor	Claughaun	Midleton	2-05	11
1987	John Regan	Causeway	Patrickswell	1-05	8
1988	Val Donnellan	Feakle	Ballyduff	3-07	16
1989	John Buckley	Glen Rovers	Ballyduff	2-03	9
1990	Declan Coote	Éire Óg, Ennis	Roanmore	2-05	11
1991	Tommy Grogan	Cashel King Cormacs	Clarecastle	1-09	12
1992	Paddy Kelly	Kilmallock	Sixmilebridge	2-05	11
1993	Mike Nolan	Toomevara	Patrickswell	1-11	14
1994	Ger Manley	Midleton	Mount Sion	2-11	17
1995	Gary Kirby	Patrickswell	Ballyduff	1-07	10
1996	Paul Flynn	Ballygunner	Na Piarsaigh	1-12	15
1997	Gary Kirby	Patrickswell	Ballyheigue	1-10	13
1998	Tommy Dunne	Toomevara	Blackrock	1-06	9
1998	Jamesie O'Connor	St. Joseph's, Doora-Barefield	Toomevara	0-09	9
1999	Tommy Dunne	Toomevara	Ahane	1-07	10
2000	Gary Kirby	Patrickswell	Toomevara	1-08	11
2000	Niall Gilligan	Sixmilebridge	Mount Sion	1-08	11
2001	Alan Browne	Blackrock	Kilmoyley	2-07	13
2001	Paul Flynn	Ballygunner	St. Joseph's, Doora-Barefield	0-13	13
2002	Shane Brick	Kilmoyley	Blackrock	1-10	13
2003	James Bowles	Newtownshandrum	Patrickswell	2-03	9
2003	Paul O'Grady	Patrickswell	Mount Sion	0-09	9
2004	Seán Ryan	Mount Sion	Ahane	4-00	12
2005	Mike Conway	Lixnaw	Thurles Sarsfields	3-07	16
2006	Willie Ryan	Toomevara	Ballyduff	2-01	7
2006	Bobby O'Sullivan	Ballyduff	Toomevara	1-04	7
2006	Ken Dunne	Toomevara	Erin's Own	1-04	7
2006	Ken Dunne	Toomevara	Ballyduff	0-07	7
2006	Ken McGrath	Mount Sion	Toomevara	0-07	7
2007	Aidan Lynch	Tulla	Lixnaw	1-08	11
2008	Pat Ryan	Sarsfields	Clonlara	0-14	14
2009	Declan Hannon	Adare	Newtownshandrum	1-13	16
2010	Cian McCarthy	Sarsfields	De La Salle	1-06	9
2011	Shane Dowling	Na Piarsaigh	Ballygunner	2-04	10
2011	Shane Dowling	Na Piarsaigh	Crusheen	1-07	10
2012	Jake Dillon	De La Salle	Thurles Sarsfields	0-09	9
2013	Noel McGrath	Loughmore-Castleiney	Na Piarsaigh	0-09	9
2014	Cian McCarthy	Sarsfields	Kilmallock	0-12	12
2015	Brian O'Sullivan	Ballygunner	Glen Rovers	0-09	9
2015	Brian O'Sullivan	Ballygunner	Na Piarsaigh	1-06	9
2016	Tony Kelly	Ballyea	Thurles Sarsfields	1-10	13
2017	Ronan Lynch	Na Piarsaigh	Blackrock	0-15	15
2018	Niall Deasy	Ballyea	Ballygunner	2-10	16
2019	Patrick Horgan	Glen Rovers	Borris-Ileigh	2-04	10
2019	Pauric Mahony	Ballygunner	Sixmilebridge	0-10	10
2020	No championship				
2021	Micheál Houlihan	Kilmallock	Midleton	0-11	11
2022	Pauric Mahony	Ballygunner	Na Piarsaigh	0-13	13
2023	Pauric Mahony	Ballygunner	Na Piarsaigh	0-11	11
2023	Billy Seymour	Kiladangan	Clonlara	0-11	11
2024	Pauric Mahony	Ballygunner	Doon	0-11	11
2024	Pauric Mahony	Ballygunner	Sarsfields	1-08	11

==== Finals ====
Final	Top scorer	Team	Score	Total
1964	Tom Corbett	Glen Rovers	0-05	5
1965	Pierce Freaney	St. Finbarr's	0-08	8
1966	Mick Roche	Carrick Davins	1-09	12
1967	Mick Roche	Carrick Davins	0-05	5
1968	Mick Arthur	Newmarket-on-Fergus	2-00	6
1969	Francis Loughnane	Roscrea	2-01	7
1970	Francis Loughnane	Roscrea	1-05	8
1971	Pat Moylan	Blackrock	1-05	8
1972	Liam McAuliffe	Glen Rovers	2-02	8
1973	Timmy Ryan	Newmarket-on-Fergus	0-09	9
1974	Charlie McCarthy	St. Finbarr's	0-04	4
1975	Ray Cummins	Blackrock	3-02	11
1976	Patsy Harte	Glen Rovers	1-03	6
1977	Charlie McCarthy (D)	St. Finbarr's	2-02	8
1977	John Allen (R)	St. Finbarr's	1-01	4
1978	Ray Cummins	Blackrock	2-00	6
1979	John Grogan	Dunhill	1-03	6
1980	Charlie McCarthy	St. Finbarr's	0-06	6
1981	Jim Greene	Mount Sion	1-06	9
1982	Richie Bennis	Patrickswell	0-05	5
1983	Kevin Hennessy	Midleton	3-01	10
1984	Gerry McInerney	Sixmilebridge	1-05	8
1985	Paddy Williams	Kilrunae MacDonagh's	0-03	3
1986	Noel O'Dwyer	Borris-Ileigh	0-09	9
1987	John Fenton	Midleton	0-06	6
1987	Pat O'Neill	Cappawhite	0-06	6
1988	Shane Ahern	Mount Sion	2-06	12
1989	Christy Keyes	Ballybrown	1-04	7
1990	Gary Kirby	Patrickswell	0-06	6
1991	Tommy Grogan	Cashel King Cormac's	0-04	4
1992	Paddy Kelly	Kilmallock	2-05	11
1993	Michael Nolan	Toomevara	0-08	8
1994	Tommy Dunne	Toomevara	0-08	8
1995	Gerry McInerney	Sixmilebridge	1-02	5
1995	John Chaplin	Sixmilebridge	0-05	5
1995	Michael Cleary	Nenagh Éire Óg	0-05	5
1996	Paul Flynn	Ballygunner	2-04	10
1996	Paul O'Rourke	Wolfe Tones, Shannon	2-04	10
1997	Gary Kirby	Patrickswell	0-11	11
1998	Jamesie O'Connor	St. Joseph's, Doora-Barefield	0-09	9
1999	Paul Flynn	Ballygunner	1-05	8
2000	Niall Gilligan	Sixmilebridge	1-08	11
2001	Paul Flynn	Ballygunner	1-09	12
2002	Ken McGrath	Mount Sion	0-09	9
2003	James Bowles	Newtownshandrum	2-03	9
2004	Ken McGrath	Mount Sion	1-06	9
2005	Ben O'Connor	Newtownshandrum	0-06	6
2006	Ken Dunne	Toomevara	1-04	7
2007	Evan Sweeney	Loughmore-Castleiney	1-02	5
2008	John Mullane	De La Salle	1-02	5
2009	Paul Flynn	Ballygunner	0-08	8
2010	John Mullane	De La Salle	0-05	5
2011	Adrian Breen	Na Piarsaigh	1-03	6
2012	Jake Dillon	De La Salle	0-09	9
2013	Kevin Ryan	Na Piarsaigh	1-03	6
2014	Jake Mulcahy	Kilmallock	1-06	9
2014	Conor McGrath	Cratloe	1-06	9
2015	Brian O'Sullivan	Ballygunner	1-06	9
2016	Conor Dorris	Glen Rovers	2-01	7
2016	Niall Deasy	Ballyea	0-07	7
2017	Adrian Breen	Na Piarsaigh	1-05	8
2018	Pauric Mahony	Ballygunner	1-06	9
2019	Brendan Maher	Borris-Ileigh	0-07	7
2020	No championship			
2021	Dessie Hutchinson	Ballygunner	1-05	8
2022	Pauric Mahony	Ballygunner	0-10	10
2023	Pauric Mahony	Ballygunner	0-10	10
2024	Pauric Mahony	Ballygunner	1-08	11

=== Players ===
Players who have won the most Munster Championship titles
T	Player	Team	Years won				
T	Player	Team	Years won	5	Donie Collins	Blackrock	1971, 1973, 1975, 1978, 1979
5	Pat Kavanagh	Blackrock	1971, 1973, 1975, 1978, 1979				
5	Pat Moylan	Blackrock	1971, 1973, 1975, 1978, 1979				
4	David Breen	Na Piarsaigh	2011, 2013, 2015, 2017				
4	Barry Coughlan	Ballygunner	2018, 2021, 2022, 2023				
4	Frank Cummins	Blackrock	1971, 1973, 1975, 1978				
4	Ray Cummins	Blackrock	1973, 1975, 1978, 1979				
4	Alan Dempsey	Na Piarsaigh	2011, 2013, 2015, 2017				
4	Kevin Downes	Na Piarsaigh	2011, 2013, 2015, 2017				
4	Ian Kenny	Ballygunner	2018, 2021, 2022, 2023				
4	John Horgan	Blackrock	1971, 1973, 1975, 1978				
4	Kieran Kennedy	Na Piarsaigh	2011, 2013, 2015, 2017				
4	Pádraic Kennedy	Na Piarsaigh	2011, 2013, 2015, 2017				
4	John Horgan	Blackrock	1971, 1973, 1975, 1978				
4	Cathal King	Na Piarsaigh	2011, 2013, 2015, 2017				
4	Tony Maher	St. Finbarr's	1965, 1974, 1977, 1980				
4	Pauric Mahony	Ballygunner	2018, 2021, 2022, 2023				
4	Philip Mahony	Ballygunner	2018, 2021, 2022, 2023				
4	Charlie McCarthy	St. Finbarr's	1965, 1974, 1977, 1980				
4	Tim Murphy	Blackrock	1973, 1975, 1978, 1979				
4	Frank Norberg	Blackrock	1971, 1973, 1975, 1979				
4	Éamonn O'Donoghue	Blackrock	1973, 1975, 1978, 1979				
4	Billy O'Keefe	Ballygunner	2018, 2021, 2022, 2023				
4	Stephen O'Keeffe	Ballygunner	2018, 2021, 2022, 2023				
4	Shane O'Sullivan	Ballygunner	2018, 2021, 2022, 2023				
4	Kevin Ryan	Na Piarsaigh	2011, 2013, 2015, 2017				

=== Miscellaneous ===
- John Horgan of Blackrock holds the record of being the only player to captain his club to three Munster club titles. These victories came in 1971, 1973 and 1978.
- Cork clubs hold the record for the most consecutive appearances in Munster finals. They played in twelve-in-a-row between 1969 and 1980, with success coming on eleven of those occasions.
- Cork is the only county to have completed the Munster junior, intermediate and senior treble at club level in the same year. This feat was achieved in 2005 when Fr. O'Neill's, Ballinhassig and Newtownshandrum claimed their respective titles in their respective grades.
- Tipperary hold the record for the number of clubs that have won the Munster title, with nine different clubs all claiming provincial victories on behalf of the county.
- Ballygunner hold the record for appearances in Munster finals. They have appeared in fourteen provincial deciders.
- Five clubs have secured back-to-back Munster titles: Newmarket-on-Fergus in 1968, Roscrea in 1970, Blackrock in 1979, St. Joseph's, Doora-Barefield in 1999, and Ballygunner in 2022 and 2023.
- Ballygunner are the only club to have won three titles in a row from 2021 to 2023
- Five players have captained both their club and their county to Munster titles: Christy Ring, John Horgan, Martin O'Doherty, John Fenton and Tommy Dunne.
- St. Finbarrs won the Munster Senior Club Football and Hurling championships in 1980 and are currently the only Munster club team to achieve this double.

== See also ==
- All-Ireland Senior Club Hurling Championship
  - Connacht Senior Club Hurling Championship
  - Leinster Senior Club Hurling Championship
  - Ulster Senior Club Hurling Championship
- Munster Senior Club Football Championship
