= Billy Walton (hurler) =

Irish hurler

Personal information
- Native name: Liam de Bháltún (Irish)
- Born: 16 May 1961 Kilkenny, Ireland
- Died: 18 November 2012 (aged 51) Kilkenny, Ireland

Sport
- Sport: Hurling
- Position: Left wing-forward
Club
- Years: Club
- James Stephens
Club titles
- Kilkenny titles: 1
- Leinster titles: 1
- All-Ireland Titles: 1
Inter-county
- Years: County
- 1981-1982: Kilkenny
Inter-county titles
- Leinster titles: 0
- All-Irelands: 0
- NHL: 1

William Walton (16 May 1961 – 18 November 2012) was an Irish hurler who played as a left wing-forward for the Kilkenny senior team.

Born in Kilkenny, Walton first played competitive hurling during his schooling at St. Kieran's College. He arrived on the inter-county scene at the age of seventeen when he first linked up with the Kilkenny minor team, before later joining the under-21 side. He made his senior debut in the 1981–82 National Hurling League. Walton went on to play a minor role for Kilkenny for just one season, and won one a set of All-Ireland and Leinster medals as a non-playing substitute, as well as a National Hurling League medal.

At club level Walton was a one-time All-Ireland medallist with James Stephens. In addition to this he also won one Leinster medal and one championship medal.

Walton's father, Tom, enjoyed All-Ireland success with Kilkenny in 1947.

For over twenty years Walton acted as selector and manager of a host of underage and adult teams, as well as serving as juvenile coaching officer with James Stephens.

== Honours ==
=== Team ===
James Stephens

- All-Ireland Senior Club Hurling Championship (1): 1982
- Leinster Senior Club Hurling Championship (1): 1981
- Kilkenny Senior Hurling Championship (1): 1981

Kilkenny

- All-Ireland Senior Hurling Championship (1): 1982 (sub)
- Leinster Senior Hurling Championship (1): 1982 (sub)
- National Hurling League (1): 1981-82
