= Jim Greene =

Irish hurler

Personal information
- Native name: Séamus Ó hUaine (Irish)
- Born: 1950 (age 75–76) Waterford, Ireland

Sport
- Sport: Hurling
- Position: Full-forward
Club
- Years: Club
- 1960s-1980s: Mount Sion
Club titles
- Waterford titles: 8
- Munster titles: 1
- All-Ireland Titles: 0
Inter-county
- Years: County
- 1968–1986: Waterford
Inter-county titles
- Munster titles: 0
- All-Irelands: 0
- NHL: 0
- All Stars: 1

Jim Greene (born 1950) is an Irish retired hurler who played as a full-forward for the Waterford senior team.

Greene joined the team in 1968 and became a regular player until his retirement in 1986. During that time he appeared in numerous Munster finals but ended his career without any major honours. He won an All-Star award in 1982. He also lined out for Waterford in the minor and under-21 grades.

At club level Greene enjoyed a successful career with Mount Sion, winning a Munster club winners' medal and eight county club championship winners medal.
