= 1914 All-Ireland Senior Hurling Championship final =

1914 All-Ireland Senior Hurling Final
- Event: 1914 All-Ireland Senior Hurling Championship
Clare	Laois
5-1	1-0
- Date: 18 October 1914
- Venue: Croke Park, Dublin

The 1914 All-Ireland Senior Hurling Championship Final was the twenty-seventh All-Ireland Final and the culmination of the 1914 All-Ireland Senior Hurling Championship, an inter-county hurling tournament for the top teams in Ireland.

Clare were the winners.

Monadrehid GAA Club refused a request from the Laois County Board for a contribution after the team reached the 1914 final. The club was using its money locally to deal with a player-welfare issue of their own.
