= 1914 All-Ireland Senior Hurling Championship =

Championship details
- Dates: 10 May – 18 October 1914
- Teams: 14

All-Ireland champions
- Winning team: Clare (1st win)
- Captain: Amby Power

All-Ireland Finalists
- Losing team: Laois
- Captain: Jack Carroll

Provincial champions
- Munster: Clare
- Leinster: Laois
- Ulster: Monaghan
- Connacht: Galway

Championship statistics
- No. matches played: 14
- Goals total: 88 (6.2 per game)
- Points total: 75 (5.3 per game)
- All-Star Team: See here

The 1914 All-Ireland Senior Hurling Championship was the 28th staging of the All-Ireland hurling championship since its establishment by the Gaelic Athletic Association in 1887. The championship began on 10 May 1914 and ended on 18 October 1914.

Kilkenny entered the championship as defending champions, however, they were beaten by Laois in the Leinster final. Clare won the title following a 5–1 to 1–0 defeat of Laois in the final.

== Teams ==
=== Team summaries ===
Team	Colours	Most recent success	
Team	Colours	All-Ireland	Provincial
Clare	Saffron and blue		1889
Cork	Red and white	1903	1912
Dublin	Navy and blue	1889	1908
Galway	Maroon and white		1912
Kerry	Green and gold	1891	1891
Kilkenny	Black and amber	1913	1913
Laois	Blue and white		
Limerick	Green and white	1897	1911
Offaly	Green, white and gold		
Roscommon	Blue and saffron		1913
Tipperary	Blue and gold	1908	1913
Waterford	Blue and white		
Westmeath	Maroon and white		
Wexford	Purple and gold	1910	1910

== Results ==
=== Connacht Senior Hurling Championship ===
23 August Final	Roscommon	1–1 – 4–2; Abandoned	Galway	Roscommon

27 September Final refixture	Roscommon	2–1 – 5–1	Galway	Roscommon

=== Ulster Senior Hurling Championship ===
6 December Final	Monaghan	2–0 – 2–0	Antrim	Shaun's Park, Belfast

3 January 1915 Final Replay	Monaghan	4–3 – 2–0	Antrim	Clones Sportsfield

=== Leinster Senior Hurling Championship ===
24 May Quarter-final	Laois	4–3 – 1–4	Wexford	Kilkenny

7 June Quarter-final	Dublin	4–4 – 2–1	Offaly	Portlaoise

14 June Semi-final	Kilkenny	7–6 – 0–1	Westmeath	Croke Park

12 July Semi-final	Laois	4–3 – 3–5	Dublin	Tullamore

2 August Final	Kilkenny	2–4 – 3–2	Laois	Kilkenny

=== Munster Senior Hurling Championship ===
10 May Quarter-final	Kerry	4–1 – 7–3	Clare	Listowel

21 June Semi-final	Waterford	1–1 – 4–2	Cork	Waterford

5 July Quarter-final	Limerick	8–0 – 3–1	Tipperary	Fraher Field

30 August Semi-final	Clare	4–2 – 0–2	Limerick

20 September Final	Clare	3–2 – 3–1	Cork	Thurles Sportsfield

=== All-Ireland Senior Hurling Championship ===
6 September Semi-final	Clare	6–6 – 0–0	Galway	Portlaoise

18 October Final	Clare	5–1 – 1–0	Laois	Croke Park

== Championship statistics ==
=== Miscellaneous ===
- Monaghan win the Ulster title for the first time in their history. They then opt to play in the All-Ireland Junior Hurling Championship for the conclusion of the 1914 season.
- Laois win the Leinster title for the first time in their history.
- The All-Ireland final is the first ever championship meeting of Clare and Laois. Clare win the All-Ireland title for the first time in their history.

== Sources ==
- Corry, Eoghan, The GAA Book of Lists (Hodder Headline Ireland, 2005).
- Donegan, Des, The Complete Handbook of Gaelic Games (DBA Publications Limited, 2005).
