= Tony Considine =

Personal information
- Born: Cratloe, County Clare, Ireland

Sport
- Sport: Hurling
Club management
- Years: Club
- Garryspillane
	1	0	0
Inter-county management
- Years: Team
- 2006–2007: Clare

Tony Considine served as manager of the Clare senior hurling team from November 2006 until August 2007. Prior to his role with Clare, Considine had guided the County Limerick club Garryspillane to a county senior title in 2005.

== Clare manager ==
=== Appointment ===
Considine was ratified as the Clare hurling manager, to succeed Anthony Daly, at a county board meeting in Ennis in November 2006. He had previously served as a selector on the Clare All-Ireland junior winning team of 1993 under Mike McNamara. At senior level, he was also part of Ger Loughnane's senior Clare hurling backroom team (along with McNamara) in the mid-1990s. Considine had also spent a number of years as a "controversial and very earnest" pundit with the Irish Examiner newspaper where his critical viewpoint did not always draw the appreciation of players.

In October 2006, on a local radio programme, Considine had expressed his dismay that his friend Ger Loughnane had accepted a management role with Galway GAA and urged Clare Gaelic Athletic Association leaders to "stop talented GAA people leaving Clare". Considine was subsequently approached to take over the role of Clare hurling manager.

Upon his ratification as the manager in November 2006, Considine announced a backroom team which included Tim Crowe, Ciaran O'Neill, former Clare hurler Pat O'Connor and Ger Ward. Ger Ward, however, stood down from his role as Clare selector in February 2007.

In May 2007, the Clare manager had to survive an attempted vote of no confidence at a county board meeting. According to the Irish Examiner, the vote arose following a "row with goalkeeper Davy Fitzgerald".

=== Player departures ===
A few months into Considine's tenure, it was reported that the veteran Clare goalkeeper Davy Fitzgerald was unhappy with aspects of Considine's approach. And, despite a meeting between the two, Fitzgerald was omitted from Clare's National League panel. Fitzgerald's departure was linked to a disagreement between the pair about "training regimes". Philip Brennan became Clare's goalkeeper for the 2007 season.

The forward Tony Carmody also left the Clare squad, early in Considine's tenure, during the 2007 National Hurling League campaign. Another Clare forward, Tony Griffen, an all-star winner in 2006, decided to undertake a cycle across both Ireland and Canada to raise funds for cancer research in the wake of the death of his father from the disease between February and June 2007. This meant Clare was without the service of another experienced attacking player.

Prior to the start of the Munster championship clash with Cork at Semple Stadium on 27 May 2007, a number of players from both the Clare and Cork teams engaged in a pre-match scuffle. Several Cork and Clare players were subsequently handed four-week suspensions.

=== On field performances ===
The Clare senior hurling team endured a poor 2007 failing to qualify for the quarter-finals of the Allianz National Hurling League. The division 1A campaign saw defeats to Wexford and Cork with the home win over Waterford the subsequent League and Munster champions the only highlights.

On 27 May 2007, Clare lost to Cork in the Munster championship opening round game on a scoreline of 1–18 to 1–11. A pre-match scuffle between these sides resulted in one-month bans to Colin Lynch, Alan Markham, Andrew Quinn and Barry Nugent.

Considine subsequently saw his side draw Laois, Antrim and Galway in the 2007 All-Ireland Senior Hurling Championship back-door qualifiers. During the qualifiers, Clare narrowly defeated Galway by 2–10 to 0–14. With other wins against Antrim and Laois, Clare emerged top of group A to qualify for the quarter-final of the All-Ireland. Considine's side were defeated, at the 2007 quarter-finals stage, by Limerick. This game, on 29 July 2007, was Tony Considine's final game in charge of Clare.

== Role with Clare ends ==
Following a season, described in the Irish Independent as a "troubled season" and in the Irish Examiner newspaper as being "shrouded in controversy" and causing members of the Clare county board "much annoyance", Considine was dismissed from his role as Clare hurling manager in August 2007. Club delegates at a Clare county board meeting voted 45 to 6 to remove the management from their roles. Following his departure, Considine expressed his disappointment at the manner of his dismissal and reportedly stated that "Even Saddam Hussein got a trial". Mike McNamara succeeded Considine as manager of the Clare senior hurling team ahead of the 2008 season.

Considine subsequently returned to working as a hurling media pundit.

Sporting positions
Preceded by Anthony Daly	Clare Senior Hurling Manager; 2006–2007	Succeeded by Mike McNamara
