= 2025 Clare Senior Hurling Championship =

Annual hurling competition season

Canon Hamilton Cup 2025
- League: Clare GAA
- Sport: Hurling
- Duration: 25 July - 5 October 2025
- Teams: 16
- Sponsor: TUS Midlands Midwest

Changes From 2024
- Promoted: Wolfe Tones Shannon
- Relegated: O'Callaghan's Mills

Changes For 2026
- Promoted: O'Callaghan's Mills
- Relegated: Corofin

County Championship
- Winners: Éire Óg
- Runners-up: Clooney-Quin
- Finals venue: Cusack Park, Ennis

Seasons
- ← 2024 2026 →

The 2025 TUS Clare Senior Hurling Championship was the 130th staging of the Clare Senior Hurling Championship since its establishment by the Clare County Board in 1887.

The draws for the 2025 Clare club championship group stages took place on 20 May 2025. The championship was contested by 16 teams. The group stage was in a round-robin format, with each team playing each team in their group once.

The draws for the quarter-finals and relegation playoffs took place on 25 August 2025. The quarter-finals were played between the winners of each group versus the runners up of each group. The relegation playoffs were played between the last-place teams of each group, with the losers of these entering a relegation final to determine the relegated team.

The draws for the semi-finals and relegation final took place on 7 September 2025. The relegation final was won by St. Joseph's Doora-Barefield, relegating Corofin to the 2026 Clare Intermediate Hurling Championship. The final was won by Éire Óg, who defeated Clooney-Quin; it was Éire Óg's first senior hurling championship win in 35 years.

== Senior Championship Fixtures ==
=== Group stage ===
- Four groups of four.
- Each team plays all the other teams in their group once. Two points are awarded for a win and one for a draw.
- In cases where two or more teams are on equal points, only the matches between the relevant teams are used to calculate the score difference when determining placement in the group.
  - The top two teams in each group advance to the Quarter-Finals
  - The bottom-placed team from each group contest the Relegation Playoffs

==== Group 1 ====
Quarter-Finalist Relegation Playoff

Team	Pld	W	D	L	F	A	Diff	Pts
Clonlara	3	3	0	0	74	54	+20	6
Sixmilebridge	3	2	0	1	74	62	+12	4
Crusheen	3	1	0	2	64	63	+1	2
St Joseph's Doora-Barefield	3	0	0	3	50	83	-33	0

25 July 2025 Round 1	Clonlara	1-19 (22) - 1-18 (21)	Sixmilebridge	Cusack Park, Ennis
				Referee: Jarlath Donnellan

26 July 2025 Round 1	Crusheen	0-23 (23) - 1-15 (18)	St Joseph's Doora-Barefield	Cusack Park, Ennis
				Referee: Niall Malone

9 August 2025 Round 2	Clonlara	3-21 (30) - 0-12 (12)	St Joseph's Doora-Barefield	O'Garney Park, Sixmilebridge
				Referee: John Bugler

10 August 2025 Round 2	Sixmilebridge	1-20 (23) - 1-17 (20)	Crusheen	St Joseph's Doora-Barefield GAA Grounds, Gurteen
				Referee: Jim Hickey

23 August 2025 Round 3	Clonlara	0-22 (22) - 1-18 (21)	Crusheen	Páirc an Dálaigh, Tulla
				Referee: Jim Hickey

23 August 2025 Round 3	Sixmilebridge	1-27 (30) - 2-14 (20)	St Joseph's Doora-Barefield	Cusack Park, Ennis
				Referee: Jarlath Donnellan

==== Group 2 ====
Quarter-Finalist Relegation Playoff

Team	Pld	W	D	L	F	A	Diff	Pts
Clooney-Quin	3	2	1	0	72	68	+4	5
Inagh-Kilnamona	3	2	0	1	87	70	+17	4
Broadford	3	1	0	2	80	70	+10	2
Corofin	3	0	1	2	61	92	-31	1

26 July 2025 Round 1	Clooney-Quin	1-18 (21) - 2-12 (18)	Broadford	Wolfe Tones GAA Grounds, Shannon
				Referee: Jim Hickey

26 July 2025 Round 1	Inagh-Kilnamona	0-31 (31) - 0-18 (18)	Corofin	St Joseph's Doora-Barefield
				Referee: Eoghan O'Leary

9 August 2025 Round 2	Corofin	4-10 (22) - 5-25 (40)	Broadford	Cusack Park, Ennis
				Referee: Eoghan O'Leary

10 August 2025 Round 2	Inagh-Kilnamona	2-23 (29) - 1-27 (30)	Clooney-Quin	Cusack Park, Ennis
				Referee: Niall Malone

24 August 2025 Round 3	Corofin	1-18 (21) - 0-21 (21)	Clooney-Quin	Clarecastle GAA Grounds, Clarecastle
				Referee: Kieran Liddane

24 August 2025 Round 3	Inagh-Kilnamona	1-24 (27) - 2-16 (22)	Broadford	Cusack Park, Ennis
				Referee: Joseph Mullins

==== Group 3 ====
Quarter-Finalist Relegation Playoff

Team	Pld	W	D	L	F	A	Diff	Pts
Éire Óg Inis	3	3	0	0	84	57	+27	6
Feakle	3	1	1	1	62	64	-2	3
Wolfe Tones, Shannon	3	1	1	1	56	64	-8	3
Newmarket-on-Fergus	3	0	0	3	57	74	-17	0

25 July 2025 Round 1	Newmarket-on-Fergus	1-18 (21) - 2-24 (30)	Éire Óg Inis	Clarecastle GAA Grounds, Clarecastle
				Referee: John Bugler

26 July 2025 Round 1	Feakle	0-19 (19) - 1-16 (19)	Wolfe Tones, Shannon	Cusack Park, Ennis
				Referee: Joseph Mullins

8 August 2025 Round 2	Feakle	1-19 (22) - 1-17 (20)	Newmarket-on-Fergus	Cusack Park, Ennis
				Referee: Fergal O'Brien

9 August 2025 Round 2	Wolfe Tones, Shannon	1-12 (15) - 1-26 (29)	Éire Óg Inis	Fr Murphy Park
				Referee: Kevin Corry

25 August 2025 Round 3	Wolfe Tones, Shannon	0-22 (22) - 0-16 (16)	Newmarket-on-Fergus	O'Garney Park, Sixmilebridge
				Referee: John Bugler

24 August 2025 Round 3	Feakle	1-18 (21) - 3-16 (25)	Éire Óg Inis	Cusack Park, Ennis
				Referee: Eoghan O'Leary

==== Group 4 ====
Quarter-Finalist Relegation Playoff

Team	Pld	W	D	L	F	A	Diff	Pts
Kilmaley	3	3	0	0	92	69	+23	6
Ballyea	3	2	0	1	72	64	+8	4
Cratloe	3	1	0	2	63	79	-16	2
Scariff	3	0	0	3	70	85	-15	0

26 July 2025 Round 1	Kilmaley	2-20 (26) - 3-16 (25)	Ballyea	O'Garney Park, Sixmilebridge
				Referee: Kevin Corry

26 July 2025 Round 1	Cratloe	1-24 (27) - 1-21 (24)	Scariff	Broadford GAA Grounds Broadford
				Referee: Fergal O'Brien

9 August 2025 Round 2	Cratloe	0-20 (20) - 5-17 (32)	Kilmaley	Cusack Park, Ennis
				Referee: Joseph Mullins

10 August 2025 Round 2	Scariff	2-16 (22) - 1-21 (24)	Ballyea	Cusack Park, Ennis
				Referee: Jarlath Donnellan

23 August 2025 Round 3	Scariff	2-18 (24) - 1-31 (34)	Kilmaley	Cusack Park, Ennis
				Referee: Chris Maguire

23 August 2025 Round 3	Cratloe	0-16 (16) - 0-23 (23)	Ballyea	O'Garney Park, Sixmilebridge
				Referee: Niall Malone

=== Quarter-finals ===
- Played by the top 2 teams from Groups 1–4
  - The first-place team from each group is drawn to play a second-place team each group

6 September 2025 Quarter-Final	Ballyea	2-13 (19) - 0-16 (16)	Clonlara	Cusack Park, Ennis
		Report		Referee: Kevin Corry

6 September 2025 Quarter-Final	Kilmaley	1-21 (24) - 1-8 (11)	Sixmilebridge	Cusack Park, Ennis
		Report		Referee: Niall Malone

7 September 2025 Quarter-Final	Clooney-Quin	1-20 (23) - 1-11 (14)	Feakle	Cusack Park, Ennis
	Peter Duggan 0-8 (5f, 1sl); Darragh McNamara 1-0; Dannan Fox 0-3; Jerry O’Connor 0-2; Jimmy Corry 0-2; Ryan Taylor 0-2; Callum Hassett 0-1; Jack O’Neill 0-1; John Conneally 0-1	Report	Oisin Donnellan 0-6 (5f); Martin Daly 1-1; Oisin Clune 0-1; Eoin Tuohy 0-1; Oisin O’Connor 0-1; Owen McGann 0-1	Referee: Fergal O'Brien

7 September 2025 Quarter-Final	Éire Óg Inis	3-21 (30) - 1-17 (20)	Inagh-Kilnamona	Cusack Park, Ennis
		Report		Referee: John Bugler

=== Semi-finals ===
20 September 2025 Semi-Final	Kilmaley	1-12 (15) - 1-14 (17)	Éire Óg Inis	Cusack Park, Ennis
16:30	M OMalley 0-7 (5f, 1’65); C Cleary 1-1; S Kennedy 0-1; E McMahon 0-1; S O’Loughlin 0-1; M O’Neill 0-1		D Russell 0-6 (5f, 1’65); O Cahill 0-3; D Moroney 1-0; D O’Brien 0-2; D Reidy 0-1; D McNamara 0-1; A Fitzgerald 0-1	Referee: Fergal O'Brien

21 September 2025 Semi-Final	Ballyea	2-19 (25) - 4-15 (27)	Clooney-Quin	Cusack Park, Ennis
15:30	T Kelly 1-14 (1-0 Pen, 6f); F Kirby 1-1; C Kirby 0-2; D Costelloe 0-1; D Moylan 0-1		P Duggan 1-10 (8f); S Scanlan 1-1; D McNamara 1-0; J O'Connor 1-0; C Hassett 0-2; R Taylor 0-1; M Duggan 0-1	Referee: John Bugler

=== County Final ===
5 October 2025 Final	Éire Óg Inis	0-17 (17) - 0-12 (12)	Clooney-Quin	Cusack Park, Ennis
15:30	D Russell 0-5 (2f, 1 65); D Reidy 0-4; M Cleary 0-4; O Cahill 0-2; S O'Donnell 0-2		P Duggan 0-9 (5f, 1 65); J Connearlly 0-1; D McNamara 0-1; C Hassett 0-1	Referee: John Bugler

=== Relegation Playoffs ===
- Played by the four bottom-placed teams from Groups 1–4
  - The loser of each playoff enters the relegation final.
  - The loser of the relegation final is relegated to the Intermediate Championship for the 2026 season

6 September 2025 Playoff 1	Newmarket-on-Fergus	1-19 (22) - 2-15 (21)	St Joseph's Doora-Barefield	Páirc an Dálaigh, Tulla
				Referee: Eoghan O'Leary

7 September 2025 Playoff 2	Corofin	0-13 (13) - 3-20 (29)	Scariff	Páirc an Dálaigh, Tulla
				Referee: Joseph Mullins

21 September 2025 Relegation Final	Corofin	2-14 (20) - 0-21 (24)	St Joseph's Doora-Barefield	Fr Murphy Park, Newmarket-on-Fergus
13:00				Referee: Kevin Corry

== Championship statistics ==
=== Miscellaneous ===
- Éire Óg win the title for the first time since 1990.
- Éire Óg won both the Clare Senior Hurling Championship and the Clare Senior Football Championship to win first 'Double' for the club since 1929.
