= 2026 Clare Senior Hurling Championship =

Annual hurling competition season

Canon Hamilton Cup 2026
- League: Clare GAA
- Sport: Hurling
- Duration: 24 July - 11 October 2026
- Teams: 16
- Sponsor: TUS Midlands Midwest

Changes From 2025
- Promoted: O'Callaghan's Mills
- Relegated: Corofin

Changes For 2027
- Promoted: TBD
- Relegated: O'Callaghan's Mills

County Championship
- Winners: Inagh-Kilnamona
- Runners-up: Kilmaley

Seasons
- ← 2025 2027 →

The 2026 TUS Clare Senior Hurling Championship is the 131st staging of the Clare Senior Hurling Championship since its establishment by the Clare County Board in 1887.

The draws for the group stage took place on 12 April 2026. The championship is contested by 16 teams. The group stage is in a round-robin format, with each team playing each team in their group once.

The quarter-finals are played between the winners of each group versus the runners up of each group. The relegation playoffs are played between the last-place teams of each group, with the losers of these entering a relegation final to determine the relegated team.

Éire Óg were the defending champion after defeating Clooney-Quin; it was Éire Óg's first senior hurling championship win in 35 years.

O'Callaghan's Mills returns to the championship after one year in the Clare Premier Intermediate Hurling Championship.

On 11 October, Inagh-Kilnamona defeated neighbours Kilmaley by 2–18 to 1–14 in the final at Zimmer Biomet Páirc Chíosóg in Ennis, to win their first Senior Hurling Championship.

== Group stage ==
- Four groups of four.
- Each team plays all the other teams in their group once. Two points are awarded for a win and one for a draw.
- In cases where two or more teams are on equal points, only the matches between the relevant teams are used to calculate the score difference when determining placement in the group.
  - The top two teams in each group advance to the Quarter-Finals
  - The bottom-placed team from each group contest the Relegation Playoffs

=== Group 1 ===
Quarter-Finalist Relegation Playoff

Team	Pld	W	D	L	F	A	Diff	Pts
Inagh-Kilnamona	3	2	1	0	74	51	23	5
Clonlara	3	1	2	0	62	58	4	4
Ballyea	3	1	1	1	79	80	-1	3
St Joseph's Doora-Barefield	3	0	0	1	61	87	-26	0

=== Group 1 Results ===
24 July Round 1	Inagh-Kilnamona	0-29 (29) - 0-19 (19)	Ballyea
		Report

25 July Round 1	Clonlara	0-22 (22) - 0-18 (18)	St Joseph's Doora-Barefield
		Report

8 August Round 2	Inagh-Kilnamona	0-25 (25) - 0-12 (12)	St Joseph's Doora-Barefield
		Report

9 August Round 2	Ballyea	1-17 (20) - 2-14 (20)	Clonlara
		Report

22 August Round 3	Ballyea	5-25 (40) - 5-16 (31)	St Joseph's Doora-Barefield
		Report

22 August Round 3	Inagh-Kilnamona	0-20 (20) - 0-20 (20)	Clonlara
		Report

=== Group 2 ===
Quarter-Finalist Relegation Playoff

Team	Pld	W	D	L	F	A	Diff	Pts
Éire Óg Inis	3	3	0	0	88	65	23	6
Scariff	3	1	0	2	79	73	6	2
Broadford	3	1	0	2	72	77	-5	2
Crusheen	3	1	0	2	61	85	-24	2

=== Group 2 Results ===
24 July Round 1	Broadford	0-27 (27) - 0-22 (22)	Scariff
		Report

25 July Round 1	Éire Óg Inis	4-18 (30) - 0-18 (18)	Crusheen
		Report

8 August Round 2	Éire Óg Inis	2-20 (26) - 1-21 (24)	Scariff
		Report

9 August Round 2	Crusheen	3-14 (33) - 2-16 (22)	Broadford
		Report

23 August Round 3	Éire Óg Inis	4-20 (32) - 0-23 (23)	Broadford
		Report

23 August Round 3	Scariff	2-27 (33) - 2-14 (20)	Crusheen
		Report

=== Group 3 ===
Quarter-Finalist Relegation Playoff

Team	Pld	W	D	L	F	A	Diff	Pts
Clooney-Quin	3	2	1	0	74	46	28	5
Cratloe	3	1	2	0	72	71	1	4
Feakle	3	1	0	2	64	71	-7	2
O'Callaghan's Mills	3	0	1	2	57	79	-22	1

=== Group 3 Results ===
25 July Round 1	Feakle	0-28 (28) - 0-18 (18)	O'Callaghan's Mills
		Report

25 July Round 1	Clooney-Quin	0-21 (21) - 1-18 (21)	Cratloe
		Report

8 August Round 2	Cratloe	4-15 (27) - 1-24 (27)	O'Callaghan's Mills

9 August Round 2	Clooney-Quin	4-17 (29) - 0-13 (13)	Feakle
		Report

22 August Round 3	Clooney-Quin	1-21 (24) - 0-12 (12)	O'Callaghan's Mills
		Report

22 August Round 3	Cratloe	2-18 (24) - 2-17 (23)	Feakle
		Report

=== Group 4 ===
Quarter-Finalist Relegation Playoff

Team	Pld	W	D	L	F	A	Diff	Pts
Kilmaley	3	3	0	0	79	56	23	6
Wolfe Tones, Shannon	3	1	0	2	65	79	-14	2
Sixmilebridge	3	1	0	2	70	74	-4	2
Newmarket-on-Fergus	3	1	0	2	67	72	-5	2

Note: Place 2 to 4 are determined without considering the games against Kilmaley. As all teams have a scoring difference of 0 the points were decided in favor of Wolfe Tones.

Team	F	A	Diff
Wolfe Tones, Shannon	50	50	0
Sixmilebridge	49	49	0
Newmarket-on-Fergus	47	47	0

=== Group 4 Results ===
24 July Round 1	Kilmaley	1-22 (25) - 1-17 (20)	Newmarket-on-Fergus
		Report

25 July Round 1	Wolfe Tones, Shannon	2-21 (27) - 3-16 (25)	Sixmilebridge
		Report

8 August Round 2	Sixmilebridge	1-21 (24) - 2-16 (22)	Newmarket-on-Fergus
		Report

8 August Round 2	Kilmaley	3-20 (29) - 0-15 (15)	Wolfe Tones, Shannon
		Report

23 August Round 3	Newmarket-on-Fergus	1-22 (25) - 2-17 (23)	Wolfe Tones, Shannon
		Report

23 August Round 3	Kilmaley	0-25 (25) - 1-18 (21)	Sixmilebridge
		Report

== Knock-out stage ==
=== Relegation Playoffs ===
- Played by the four bottom-placed teams from Groups 1–4
  - The loser of each playoff enters the relegation final.
  - The loser of the relegation final is relegated to the Premier Intermediate Championship for the 2026 season

12 September 2026 Playoff	O'Callaghan's Mills	0-22 (22) - 1-21 (24)	Crusheen	Páirc an Dálaigh, Tulla
13:00		Report		Referee: Joseph Mullins

13 September 2026 Playoff	St Joseph's Doora-Barefield	1-17 (20) - 3-19 (28)	Newmarket-on-Fergus	Páirc an Dálaigh, Tulla
12:30		Report		Referee: Kieran Liddane

27 September 2026 Relegation final	St Joseph's Doora-Barefield	2-21 (27) - 2-14 (20)	O'Callaghan's Mills	Sixmilebridge GAA
13:00		Report		Referee: Kieran Liddane

=== Quarter-finals ===
- Played by the top 2 teams from Groups 1–4
- The first-place team from each group is drawn to play a second-place team each group

12 September 2026 Quarter-final	Clooney-Quin	0-27 (27) - 1-25 (28)	Scariff	Cusack Park, Ennis
15:00		Report		Referee: Fergal O’Brien

12 September 2026 Quarter-final	Inagh-Kilnamona	1-23 (26) - 1-17 (20)	Cratloe	Cusack Park, Ennis
17:00		Report		Referee: Jarlath Donnellan

13 September 2026 Quarter-final	Éire Óg Inis	3-25 (34) - 1-14 (17)	Wolfe Tones, Shannon	Cusack Park, Ennis
14:45		Report		Referee: Niall Donovan

13 September 2026 Quarter-final	Kilmaley	1-20 (23) - 1-17 (20)	Clonlara	Cusack Park, Ennis
16:45		Report		Referee: Niall Malone

=== Semi-finals ===
26 September Semi-final	Kilmaley	0-25 (25) - 1-11 (14)	Scariff	Cusack Park, Ennis
16:30		Report		Referee: Joseph Mullins

27 September Semi-final	Éire Óg Inis	2-14 (20) - 1-24 (27)	Inagh-Kilnamona	Cusack Park, Ennis
15:30		Report		Referee: John Bugler

=== County Final ===
11 Oct 2026 Final	Kilmaley	1 - 14 (17) - 2 - 18 (24)	Inagh-Kilnamona	Cusack Park, Ennis
16:15	Sean O’Loughlin 1-3 (1f); Mikey O’Neill 0-3; Mikey O’Malley (2f), Colm Killeen 0-2 each; Conor Cleary (sl), Tommy Barry, Daire Keane, Brian McNamara 0-1 each	Report	Aidan McCarthy (3f), Fred Hegarty 1-5 each; David Fitzgerald 0-5; David Mescall, Niall Mullins, Sean Rynne 0-1 each	Referee: Niall Malone
