= Joe Power =

Joe or Joseph Power may refer to:

- Joe Power (ice hockey) (1885–1935), Canadian politician and ice hockey player
- Joe Power (hurler) (1883–?), Irish hurler
- Joe Power (psychic) (born 1966)
- Joseph Power (librarian), librarian of the University of Cambridge
- Joseph Withers Power, Mississippi politician
- Joseph Power (politician), Canadian politician
