= 2024 Clare Senior Hurling Championship =

Annual hurling competition season

Canon Hamilton Cup 2024
- League: Clare GAA
- Sport: Hurling
- Duration: 9 August - 28 October 2024
- Teams: 16
- Sponsor: TUS Midlands Midwest

Changes From 2023
- Promoted: Corofin
- Relegated: Clarecastle; Wolfe Tones Shannon

Changes For 2025
- Promoted: Wolfe Tones Shannon
- Relegated: O'Callaghan's Mills

County Championship
- Winners: Feakle
- Runners-up: Sixmilebridge

Seasons
- ← 2023 2025 →

The 2024 TUS Clare Senior Hurling Championship was the 129th staging of the Clare Senior Hurling Championship since its establishment by the Clare County Board in 1887.

The draws for the 2024 Clare club championship group stages took place on 21 May 2024. The championship was contested by 16 teams, reduced by 1 from the 2023 championship. The group stage was in a round-robin format, with each team playing each team in their group once.

The draws for the quarter-finals and relegation playoffs took place on 9 September 2024. The quarter-finals were played between the winners of each group versus the runners up of each group. The relegation playoffs were played between the last-place teams of each group, with the losers of these entering a relegation final to determine the relegated team.

The draws for the semi-finals and relegation final took place on 24 September 2024. The semi-final between Sixmilebridge and Inagh-Kilnamona featured a penalty shoot-out for the first time in the history of the Clare Senior Hurling Championship, with Sixmilebridge winning 4–3 after seven penalties each. Feakle won the other semi-final, bringing them to their first Senior Clare final in 36 years. O'Callaghan's Mills lost the relegation final, demoting them to the Clare Intermediate Hurling Championship for 2025.

The final, originally scheduled for 20 October, was postponed until THE 28 October due to Storm Ashley. Feakle won the final, attaining their first Clare senior hurling title since 1988.

== Senior Championship Fixtures ==
=== Group stage ===
- Four groups of four.
- Each team plays all the other teams in their group once. Two points are awarded for a win and one for a draw.
- In cases where two or more teams are on equal points, only the matches between the relevant teams are used to calculate the score difference when determining placement in the group.
  - The top two teams in each group advance to the Quarter-Finals
  - The bottom-placed team from each group contest the Relegation Playoffs

==== Group 1 ====
Quarter-Finalist Relegation Playoff

Team	Pld	W	D	L	F	A	Diff	Pts
Éire Óg Inis	3	3	0	0	68	62	+6	6
Clonlara	3	2	0	1	78	72	+17	4
Ballyea	3	1	0	2	59	67	-8	2
Clooney-Quin	3	0	0	3	62	77	-15	0

10 August 2024 Round 1	Éire Óg Inis	1-20 (23) - 3-13 (22)	Clooney-Quin	Cusack Park, Ennis
				Referee: Fergal O'Brien

10 August 2024 Round 1	Clonlara	1-28 (31) - 1-20 (23)	Ballyea	Cusack Park, Ennis
				Referee: John Bugler

23 August 2024 Round 2	Ballyea	0-19 (19) - 0-17 (17)	Clooney-Quin	O'Garney Park, Sixmilebridge
				Referee: Chris Maguire

25 August 2024 Round 2	Clonlara	1-20 (23) - 1-23 (26)	Éire Óg Inis	Páirc an Dálaigh, Tulla
				Referee: John Bugler

7 September 2024 Round 3	Ballyea	0-17 (17) - 0-19 (19)	Éire Óg Inis	Cusack Park, Ennis
				Referee: Eoghan O'Leary

7 September 2024 Round 3	Clonlara	3-26 (35) - 2-17 (23)	Clooney-Quin	O'Garney Park, Sixmilebridge
				Referee: Jarlath Donnellan

==== Group 2 ====
Quarter-Finalist Relegation Playoff

Team	Pld	W	D	L	F	A	Diff	Pts
Feakle	3	2	0	1	66	55	+11	4
Cratloe	3	2	0	1	77	62	+15	4
Kilmaley	3	2	0	1	82	58	+24	4
Corofin	3	0	0	3	47	97	-50	0

10 August 2024 Round 1	Feakle	0-23 (23) - 1-16 (19)	Cratloe	O'Garney Park, Sixmilebridge
				Referee: Kieran Liddane

10 August 2024 Round 1	Kilmaley	6-22 (40) - 1-11 (14)	Corofin	Clarecastle GAA Grounds, Clarecastle
				Referee: Jarlath Donnellan

25 August 2024 Round 2	Cratloe	4-23 (35) - 0-19 (19)	Corofin	Cusack Park, Ennis
				Referee: Eoghan O'Leary

25 August 2024 Round 2	Feakle	0-21 (21) - 0-22 (22)	Kilmaley	Cusack Park, Ennis
				Referee: Fergal O'Brien

8 September 2024 Round 3	Cratloe	1-20 (23) - 1-17 (20)	Kilmaley	Fr Murphy Park, Newmarket-on-Fergus
				Referee: Aaron Hogg

8 September 2024 Round 3	Feakle	3-17 (26) - 1-21 (24)	Corofin	Clarecastle GAA Grounds, Clarecastle
				Referee: Kevin Corry

==== Group 3 ====
Quarter-Finalist Relegation Playoff

Team	Pld	W	D	L	F	A	Diff	Pts
Scariff	3	2	1	0	67	61	+6	5
Inagh-Kilnamona	3	2	0	1	76	49	+27	4
Broadford	3	1	1	1	60	71	-11	3
O'Callaghan's Mills	3	0	0	3	48	70	-22	0

9 August 2024 Round 1	Broadford	2-27 (33) - 0-19 (19)	O'Callaghan's Mills	Clonlara GAA Grounds, Clonlara
				Referee: Joseph Mullins

10 August 2024 Round 1	Scariff	0-24 (24) - 0-20 (20)	Inagh-Kilnamona	O'Garney Park, Sixmilebridge
				Referee: Chris Maguire

24 August 2024 Round 2	Scariff	1-18 (21) - 2-15 (21)	Broadford	Páirc an Dálaigh, Tulla
				Referee: Aaron Hogg

25 August 2024 Round 2	Inagh-Kilnamona	2-19 (25) - 0-9 (9)	O'Callaghan's Mills	St Joseph's Doora-Barefield GAA Grounds, Gurteen
				Referee: Kevin Corry

8 September 2024 Round 3	Inagh-Kilnamona	4-19 (31) - 0-16 (16)	Broadford	Cusack Park, Ennis
				Referee: Kieran Liddane

8 September 2024 Round 3	Scariff	1-19 (22) - 1-17 (20)	O'Callaghan's Mills	Páirc an Dálaigh, Tulla
				Referee: Augustine Callaghan

==== Group 4 ====
Quarter-Finalist Relegation Playoff

Team	Pld	W	D	L	F	A	Diff	Pts
Sixmilebridge	3	2	1	0	66	58	+8	5
Crusheen	3	2	0	1	73	64	+9	4
Newmarket-on-Fergus	3	1	1	1	64	63	+1	3
St Joseph's Doora-Barefield	3	0	0	3	50	68	-18	0

9 August 2024 Round 1	Sixmilebridge	1-18 (21) - 1-12 (15)	St Joseph's Doora-Barefield	Fr Murphy Park, Newmarket-on-Fergus
				Referee: Eoghan O'Leary

10 August 2024 Round 1	Crusheen	1-21 (24) - 2-17 (23)	Newmarket-on-Fergus	Gaelic Park, Ruan
				Referee: Niall Malone

24 August 2024 Round 2	Crusheen	2-15 (21) - 1-20 (23)	Sixmilebridge	Clarecastle GAA Grounds, Clarecastle
				Referee: Augustine Callaghan

24 August 2024 Round 2	Newmarket-on-Fergus	2-13 (19) - 1-14 (17)	St Joseph's Doora-Barefield	Páirc an Dálaigh, Tulla
				Referee: Joseph Mullins

6 September 2024 Round 3	Newmarket-on-Fergus	1-19 (22) - 1-19 (22)	Sixmilebridge	Cusack Park, Ennis
				Referee: John Bugler

6 September 2024 Round 3	Crusheen	3-19 (28) - 0-18 (18)	St Joseph's Doora-Barefield	Gaelic Park, Ruan
				Referee: Fergal O'Brien

=== Quarter-finals ===
- Played by the top 2 teams from Groups 1–4
  - The first-place team from each group is drawn to play a second-place team each group

21 September 2024 Quarter-Final	Scariff	2-14 (20) - 2-15 (21)	Cratloe	Cusack Park, Ennis
	P Crotty 0-7, Rodgers 0-4 (2f, 1’65); P Ryan 1-2; E O’Brien 1-1	Report	C McGrath 0-6; R Considine (2f), C McInerney(1-0 Pen) (1-2 each); D Neville 0-2; D Ryan (f) David Collins, S Neville 0-1 each	Referee: Jarlath Donnellan

21 September 2024 Quarter-Final	Éire Óg Inis	0-20 (20) - 2-16 (22)	Inagh-Kilnamona	Cusack Park, Ennis
	D Russell 0-12 (8f, 1’65); D Reidy 0-3 (1f); D O’Brien, O Cahill, D McNamara, R Loftus, M Cleary 0-1 each	Report	A McCarthy 0-7 (5f); Eoghan Foudy, N Mullins 1-0 each; S Rynne, D Fitzgerald, F Hegarty 0-2 each; S Foudy, D Cullinan, C Hegarty 0-1 each	Referee: John Bugler

22 September 2024 Quarter-Final	Feakle	5-19 (34) - 1-14 (17)	Crusheen	Cusack Park, Ennis
	S. McGrath (1-14, 8 frees, 1 65); M. Daly, R. Bane, S. Conway, O. O’Connor (1-0 each); O. Donnellan (0-2); E. Tuohy, R. O’Connor, E. Daly (0-1 each).	Report	B. Horner (1-6, 0-4 frees); R. Hayes (0-7, 5 frees, 1 65); O. O’Donnell (0-1).	Referee: Fergal O'Brien

22 September 2024 Quarter-Final	Sixmilebridge	2-18 (24) - 0-21 (21)	Clonlara	Cusack Park, Ennis
	A. Morey (0-9, frees); J. Shanahan (1-2); D. Kennedy (1-1); B. Corry (0-3); L. Fitzpatrick, J. Loughnane, A. Mulready (0-1 each).	Report	M. O’Loughlin (0-15, 13 frees); C. O’Connell, C. O’Meara, M. Collins, I. Galvin, A. Moriarty, M. Stritch (0-1 each).	Referee: Eoghan O'Leary

=== Semi-finals ===
5 October 2024 Semi-Final	Cratloe	1-15 (18) - 1-17 (20)	Feakle	Cusack Park, Ennis
16:00	R Considine 0-8 (7f); C McInerney 1-2; C McGrath 0-3; E Boyce 0-2	Report	S McGrath 0-11 (5f); M Daly 1-0; R O’Connor 0-1; O O'Connor 0-1; O Donnellan 0-1; E Tuohy 0-1; E Daly 0-1; F Donnellan 0-1	Referee: John Bugler

6 October 2024 Semi-Final	Sixmilebridge	0-28 (28) - 1-25 (28) (a.e.t.) (4-3 p)	Inagh-Kilnamona	Cusack Park, Ennis
15:30	A Morey 0-11 (9f); J Shanahan 0-7 (3f); B Corry 0-5; D Kennedy 0-2; L Fitzpatrick 0-1; J Loughnane 0-1; A Mulready 0-1	Report	A McCarthy 0-13 (8f); C Hegarty 0-4; D Fitzgerald 0-3; F Hegarty 1-0; S Rynne 0-2; E McNamara 0-2; S Foudy 0-1	Referee: Aaron Hogg

=== County Final ===
28 October 2024 Final	Feakle	1-17 (20) - 0-13 (13)	Sixmilebridge	Cusack Park, Ennis
14:30	Shane McGrath 0-8 (6f, 2 '65); Owen McGann 1-0; Steven Conway 0-2; Oisin Donnellan 0-2; Eoin Tuohy 0-2; Martin Daly 0-1; Killian Bane 0-1; Packie Daly 0-1	Report	Alex Morey 0-5 (5f); Shane Golden 0-2; Brian Corry 0-2; Lorcan Fitzpatrick 0-1; David Kennedy 0-1; Jamie Shanahan 0-1; Brian Carey 0-1	Referee: Joseph Mullins

=== Relegation Playoffs ===
- Played by the four bottom-placed teams from Groups 1–4
  - The loser of each playoff enters the relegation final.
  - The loser of the relegation final is relegated to the Intermediate Championship for the 2025 season

21 September 2024 Playoff 1	Corofin	0-14 (14) - 0-19 (19)	St Joseph's Doora-Barefield	Clarecastle GAA Grounds, Clarecastle
				Referee: Augustine Callaghan

22 September 2024 Playoff 2	Clooney-Quin	3-18 (27) - 1-18 (21)	O'Callaghan's Mills	Páirc an Dálaigh, Tulla
				Referee: Chris Maguire

6 October 2024 Relegation Final	Corofin	2-18 (24) - 1-18 (21)	O'Callaghan's Mills	Fr Murphy Park, Newmarket-on-Fergus
16:00				Referee: Fergal O'Brien

== Championship statistics ==
=== Miscellaneous ===
- Feakle qualify for the senior final for the first time since 1988.
- Feakle win the title for the first time since 1988.
