= Paddy Hannan =

Irish-born gold prospector in Australia

Patrick Hannan
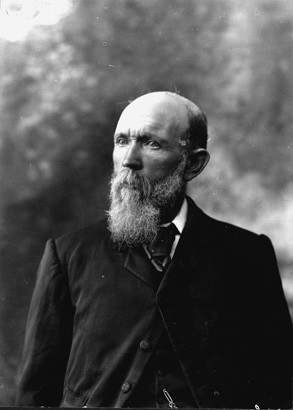
- Paddy Hannan in the 1920s (courtesy LISWA)
- Born: baptised 26 April 1840; Sixmilebridge, County Clare, Ireland
- Died: 4 November 1925, aged 85; Melbourne, Victoria, Australia

Patrick Hannan (baptised 26 April 1840 – 4 November 1925) was a gold prospector whose lucrative discovery on 14 June 1893 set off a major gold rush in the area now known as Kalgoorlie-Boulder in Western Australia.

The resulting goldfield has been mined ever since and is renowned as The Golden Mile, the richest square mile in the world. The modern open-cut mine is a vast, astonishing sight known as the Super Pit.

Hannan from Quin, County Clare, and his partners Thomas Flanagan from Ennis, County Clare and Daniel Shea from County Cork, are still remembered and celebrated in Australia and in Ireland.

== Early life ==
Paddy Hannan was the son of John Hannan and Bridget Lynch, and was baptised on 26 April 1840 in the town of Quin, County Clare, Ireland. His baptismal record shows that his godparents (sponsors) were Margaret Lynch and John O'Brien. Many of the people in his family emigrated to Australia from 1852 onwards, and close ties were maintained. Two of Hannan's nieces would welcome Hannan into their house for the last years of his life.

Hannan emigrated to Australia when he was 22, arriving in Melbourne on 23 December 1862 aboard the Henry Fernie from Liverpool. He is recorded in the passenger list as Pat Hannan, a labourer.

== Prospecting success ==
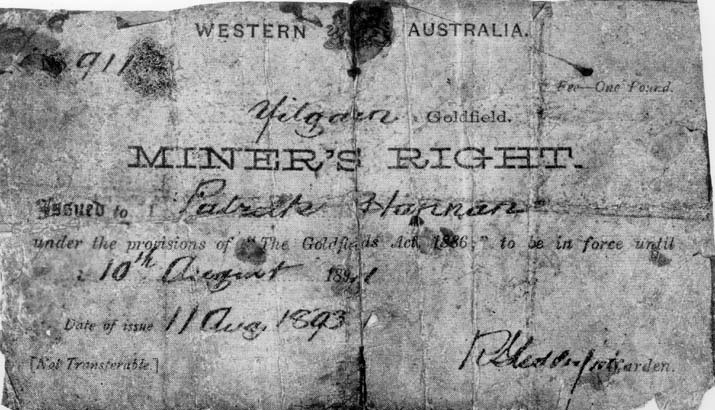
Hannan's Western Australian miner's right, 1893

In 1893 in Western Australia, Hannan and his partners were the first to find gold near Mount Charlotte, less than 40 kilometres from the existing Coolgardie Goldfields. Hannan, Flanagan and Shea were following a large number of prospectors who set out for a rumoured new prospect at Mount Youle.

One version of the story of the find has it that on the night of 14 June 1893, Hannan found gold in a gully. Not wanting to cause a rush, he concealed the find. During the night the trio moved one of their horses into the scrub. The following morning Hannan informed the main party they were going to stay behind to find their lost horse. After the main group moved off east, the three men started to pick up the gold and peg out their lease.

Amongst the various counter-claims to emerge over the years, one lively version of the story was told in 1909 by Fred Dugan (another prospector, who was present at the time) relating how Thomas Flanagan found the first nuggets, and covered his find with brushwood to conceal it until the following day.

By law, those finding "payable" gold were required to report the fact to the warden's office within seven days, so Hannan set off for Coolgardie to register their find, doing so on 17 June 1893.

It has been suggested that Hannan, rather than Flanagan or Shea, was chosen to officially register the claim because only he could read and write, but there is evidence that Flanagan was literate, since, in 1864, he had clearly signed the official death certificate of his brother John Flanagan, and had written his own place of residence at the time - White Hills (in Bendigo, Victoria, Australia).

The other possible reasons for Hannan going alone to the office at Coolgardie are set out by Martyn Webb, who relates that:

The fact that Flanagan and Shea were able to secure another 100 ounces while Hannan was away registering their claim at Coolgardie might help to explain why Hannan was chosen ... simply because they were better at specking than he was – it needs good eyesight. On the other hand, since the journey was arduous and had to be done as quickly as possible, Hannan might have been chosen because, as Uren and others suggest, he was the youngest and the fittest of the three. … The most likely reason … was that he was the undisputed leader of the party.

— Webb, p. 103

Hannan registered the claim in Flanagan's name as well as his own. Within hours a stampede began. It was estimated that about 400 men were prospecting in the area within three days, and over 1,000 within a week.

== Final years ==
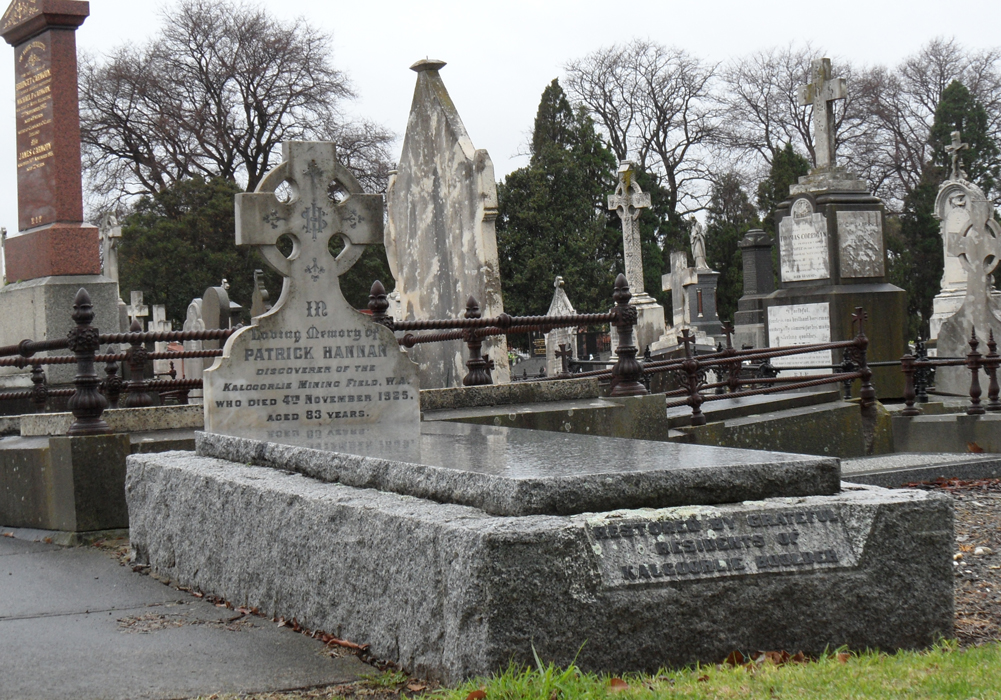
Hannan's grave in Melbourne General Cemetery, Section Y

In 1904, at the age of sixty-four, Hannan was granted an annual pension of £150 by the Government of Western Australia.

Having searched for gold throughout his adult life, he did not cease his prospecting activities until after 1910, his seventieth year. At that time he went to live with two of his nieces in Fallon Street, Brunswick, Victoria (close to the city of Melbourne).

He died there in 1925 and was buried in Melbourne General Cemetery, in the Catholic section, near the North Gate.

In 1993 his grave was restored by the citizens of Kalgoorlie, led by Tess Thomson, as a part of the celebration of the 100-year anniversary of the original find by Hannan, Flanagan and Shea.

== Legacy ==
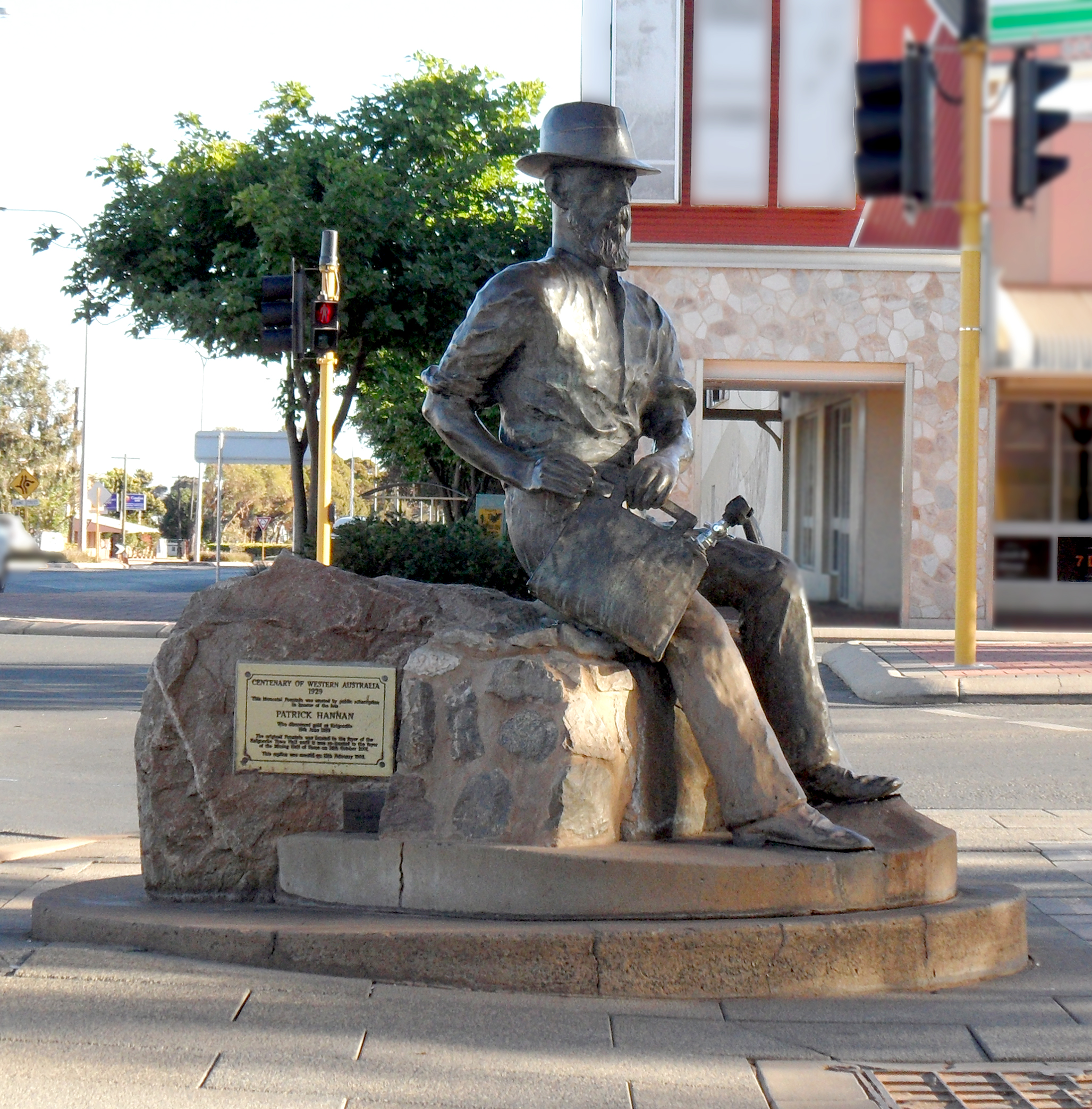
1929 statue of Paddy Hannan in Kalgoorlie, Western Australia

In memory of a man who is regarded as the founder of Kalgoorlie, the main street and a suburb in Kalgoorlie both bear Hannan's name, and in 1929 a statue of him by the sculptor John MacLeod was erected there.

The city boasts several commemorative plaques to the three Irishmen, Hannan, Flanagan and Shea. A popular Irish pub at the Burswood Entertainment Complex was also named after Hannan.

In Ireland there is a plaque dedicated to his memory opposite Quin Abbey, Quin, County Clare, and there is a bust with an explanatory dedication on display inside the DeValera Library in Ennis, County Clare.

== See also ==
- Gold mining in Western Australia
- History of Western Australia
- New South Wales gold rush
- Victorian gold rush
