= Matthew Whelan (disambiguation) =

Matthew Whelan (born 1979) is a former Australian footballer.

Matt or Matthew Whelan may also refer to:

- Matt Whelan (born 1985), New Zealand comedian and actor
- Matthew Whelan (hurler) (born 1988), Irish hurler
- Matthew Whelan (politician) (1916–2000), Canadian politician
