= Joe Power (hurler) =

Irish hurler

Personal information
- Native name: Seosamh de Paor (Irish)
- Born: 1883 Quin, County Clare, Ireland
- Died: Unknown
- Occupation: Farmer

Sport
- Sport: Hurling
- Position: Centre-back
Club titles
- Clare titles: 2
Inter-county
- Years: County
- 1900s-1910s: Clare
Inter-county titles
- Munster titles: 1
- All-Irelands: 1

Joe Power (born 1883) was an Irish hurler who played as a midfielder for the Clare senior team.

Power made his first appearance for the team around 1908 and became a regular player over the next decade. During that time he won one All-Ireland winner's medal and one Leinster winner's medal. His brother, Amby Power, was captain for those two victories.

At club level, Power played with Tulla and Carrahan and won two county championship winners' medals in a career that spanned the first two decades of the 20th century.
