= Andrew Quinn =

Andrew Quinn may refer to:

- Andrew Quinn (footballer) (born 2002), Irish footballer from Dunshaughlin, County Meath
- Andrew Quinn (hurler) (born 1983), Irish hurler from Tulla, County Clare
