= Brian Quinn (hurler) =

Irish hurler

Personal information
- Native name: Briain Ó Coinn (Irish)
- Born: 1972 (age 53–54) Tulla, County Clare, Ireland
- Height: 5 ft 10 in (178 cm)

Sport
- Sport: Hurling
- Position: Right corner-back
Club
- Years: Club
- Tulla
Club titles
- Clare titles: 1
Inter-county
| Years | County | Apps (scores) |
| 1994-2005 | Clare | 29 (0-00) |
Inter-county titles
- Munster titles: 3
- All-Irelands: 2
- NHL: 0
- All Stars: 0

Brian Quinn (born 1972) is an Irish former hurler who played as a right corner-back for the Clare senior hurling team.

Quinn made his first appearance for the team during the 1994-95 National League and became a regular member of the starting fifteen over the next decade. During that time he won one Munster medal on the field of play while he also won two All-Ireland medals as a non-playing substitute. He ended up as an All-Ireland runner-up on one occasion. He won Munster and all Ireland junior.

At club level Quinn is a one-time county club championship medalist with Tulla. His brother, Andrew Quinn, also played hurling with Clare.

== Playing career ==
=== Club ===
Quinn played his club hurling with Tulla and had much success in the twilight of his career.

In 2007 Tulla reached the final of the county championship for the first time in almost seventy-five years. Crusheen, a team who had never won the title, provided the opposition. Quinn scored a crucial goal and collected a Clare Senior Hurling Championship medal following a 1-7 to 0-9 victory. Tulla went on to contest Munster Final but lost by 2 points in terrible conditions. Quinn won his second Clare hurler of the year for his club performances, scoring seven goals along the way.

=== Inter-county ===
Quinn first came to prominence on the inter-county scene as a member of the Clare junior hurling team. He won a Munster medal in this grade in 1993 following a 2-15 to 0-10 trouncing of Waterford. Clare later qualified for an All-Ireland final meeting with Kilkenny. A 3-10 to 0-8 victory gave Quinn an All-Ireland medal.

Success in the junior grade allowed Quinn to join the Clare senior team. He made his debut in a National Hurling League game against Galway in 1994 and was an unused substitute for Clare's Munster and All-Ireland triumphs in 1995.

Quinn made his senior championship debut against Kerry in 1997, however, he was once again confined to the substitutes' bench for Clare's subsequent Munster and All-Ireland successes.

In 1998 Quinn became a regular member of the Clare starting fifteen. He won his first Munster medal on the field of play that year following a tense draw and a replay with Waterford. While Clare were installed as the favourites to retain their All-Ireland crown, a series of bizarre events led to one of the most controversial championship summers ever. Clare drew with Offaly in the All-Ireland semi-final, however, in the replay Clare were winning by two points when the referee, Jimmy Cooney, blew the whistle with two minutes of normal time left to be played. The Offaly fans were outraged and staged a sit-down protest on the Croke Park pitch. The result was not allowed to stand and Clare were forced to meet Offaly for a third time that year. They lost the second replay. Quinn got an all star nomination for his displays that year. Clare lost Munster final and all semi final again in 1999. In 2000 2001 and 2002 Clare lost all first rounds to tipp.

After a number of disappointing championship seasons, Clare surprised the hurling world by qualifying for the All-Ireland final again in 2002. Quinn's side put up a good fight against Kilkenny, however, a combined tally of 2-13 for Henry Shefflin and D. J. Carey gave "the Cats" a seven-point victory. Clare bounced back in 2003 and finally beat tipp in first round with his brother Andrew scoring an all-important goal only to get knocked out by cork and galway in the qualifiers. Quinn won his 1st Clare hurler of the year in 2003 for his displays.

Quinn continued to line out with Clare for the next few seasons but called time on his inter-county career following the team's exit from the championship in the 2005 all ireland semi final.

=== Inter-provincial ===
Quinn was included on the Munster panel in 1999 in a defeat by Connacht in the final of the Railway Cup. In 2015 after managing successful underage teams Quinn went on to manage his club Tulla at senior level for 3 years retaining senior status and reaching two quarter-finals. At underage he was involved with Tulla winning a U21 in 1992, losing a final in 1997 and a minor A final in 1998, but won again U21 in 2014. He also won a U16B and a minor B championship with Tulla /Boydke, and has been involved in successful Tulla Comogie teams.
