= Mike McNamara =

Personal information
- Nickname: Mike Mac
- Born: 1949 (age 76–77) Scariff, County Clare, Ireland
- Occupation: Publican

Sport
- Sport: Hurling
Inter-county management
- Years: Team
- 2002 – 2004 2007 – 2009: Offaly; Clare

Michael McNamara (born 1949) is an Irish former hurling manager and former player. He played hurling with his local club Scariff from the 1960s until the 1980s. McNamara is also a publican and night club owner in Scariff and served as manager of the Offaly and Clare senior inter-county teams.

== Managerial career ==
=== Offaly ===
McNamara was appointed manager of the Offaly senior hurling team in November 2002. In his first season in charge, his team lost to Wexford in the Leinster semi-final on a scoreline of 0–16 to 1–12. In the subsequent qualifying campaign, Offaly overcame Dublin and Limerick to qualify for an All Ireland quarter final against Tipperary. They lost this match 2–16 to 2–11 after a relatively poor display.

The following year, 2004, Offaly reached a Leinster final, only to be beaten by Wexford for the second successive year on a scoreline of 2–12 to 1–11. They were later knocked out of the qualifiers by Clare. Following a strike by the Offaly footballers which resulted in the resignation of their manager, Gerry Fahy on the grounds of lack of support by the county board, McNamara quit his post as Offaly hurling manager for the same reasons.

=== Clare ===
==== 2008: Munster final appearance ====
McNamara's first season in charge was a reasonably successful one. After a relatively lacklustre National Hurling League campaign, Clare were drawn to meet Waterford in the quarter-final of the Munster Championship and were installed as underdogs. An intriguing game developed, however, at the full-time whistle Clare had won by 2–26 to 0–23. The provincial semi-final pitted Clare against Limerick. While more was expected of the Shannonsiders McNamara's side had another relatively comfortable 4–12 to 1–16 victory. This win allowed Clare to advance to a first Munster final since 1999. Tipperary provided the opposition on this occasion, with Clare being regarded as underdogs once again. A close game developed in the second half as Clare ate into Tipp's lead, however, in the end victory went to Tipperary by 2–21 to 0–19. In spite of this defeat McNamara's side were allowed to advance to the All-Ireland quarter-final. Cork provided the opposition on this occasion, however, Clare went seven points ahead at one stage. Cork slowly fought back to eventually clinch a 2–19 to 2–17 victory. Thus ended Clare's involvement in the championship.

==== Allianz National Hurling League 2009 ====
On 8 February 2009 Clare started their NHL campaign they lost to Limerick 1–18 to 3–13. On 15 February they lost to Waterford 0–13 to 0–20. On 1 March they lost to Tipperary 0–16 to 0–23. On 22 March Clare lost to the Cork panel who were just back from being on strike the final score was 0–16 to 2–14. On 29 March they played Kilkenny and lost 1–09 to 3–16. On 5 April Clare drew with Dublin 0–15 to 0–15 because of this it meant that Clare were relegated. On Drivetime Sport the following Monday Mike McNamara said that Clare will not play NHL Division 2 next year against the likes of Antrim and Carlow. On 19 April Clare lost their last game of the NHL against Galway the score was 0–19 4–16.

==== Gerry Quinn Saga ====
Gerry Quinn had been left out of the Clare Hurling Panel. On 20 March 2009 Gerry Quinn went to visit the Clare Team Doctor Dr Paraic Quinn in Gurteen because he had been laid low with a virus. According to Quinn he rang Mike Mc on the way and informed him about the situation regarding his illness and his desire to meet Paraic Quinn. Quinn then claimed that Mike Mc cut loose at him on the phone. Nevertheless, Quinn was hopeful that things could be worked out when he arrived at the session and after asking McNamara whether the doctor was around, Quinn was informed that he was off the panel. On TG4 the day of the match Mike Mc was asked was Gerry Quinn still on the panel, McNamara gave no comment and when he was asked was there a drinking ban he gave no comment.

=== 2009 Player Opposition Crisis ===
In October 2009, McNamara's tenure as Clare hurling manager looked to be under threat after it emerged the players had sent a letter to the County Board seeking his removal from the post. It appears that the players were disappointed with the county's lack of progress in 2009. The panel requested that the unsigned letter be read out at a County Board meeting on 27 October 2009. At the meeting on 27 October 2009, the Clare county board gave McNamara their full backing despite the growing opposition from some players.

On 1 November 2009, the hurling panel produced a vote of no confidence in McNamara to continue as manager. After a Clare County Board meeting in Ennis on 10 November 2009, McNamama made a stirring address, confirming his desire to stay in place as manager of the Banner hurlers, reflecting on the progress made in 2009 and outlining his plans for next season. He spoke to delegates present for close to 30 minutes after members of the media had been asked to leave the room. A letter from the 27 player panel was read out at the meeting explaining that only one squad member had sided with McNamara in the vote of confidence on 1 November. In spite of the opposition, the Clare County Board stood standing behind McNamara with County Board officials pledging to work with him to iron out any problems they could.

On 6 December, following several postponements, a meeting took place between the players, the county board and the manager, which was described as 'constructive'. However, on 15 December 2009, McNamara tendered his resignation to the Clare county board, which they accepted.

=== Scariff Trainer ===
In 2010 it was announced that Mc Namara would be training his own club Scariff senior hurling team

== To Hell And Back ==
Mike McNamara's autobiography, To Hell And Back: The Inside Story of the Clare Hurling Revival, was released in 2000.

Sporting positions
| Preceded by Fr. Tom Fogarty | Offaly Senior Hurling Manager; 2002–2004 | Succeeded by John McIntyre |
| Preceded by Tony Considine | Clare Senior Hurling Manager; 2007–2009 | Succeeded by Ger O'Loughlin |
