= Jim Houlihan =

Irish hurler

Personal information
- Born: Tulla, County Clare

Sport
- Sport: Hurling
- Position: Right wing-back
Club
- Years: Club
- 1920s-1930s: Tulla
Club titles
- Clare titles: 1
Inter-county
- Years: County
- 1920s-1930s: Clare
Inter-county titles
- Munster titles: 1
- All-Irelands: 0
- NHL: 0

Jim Houlihan (1898–1967) was an Irish sportsperson. He played hurling with his local club Tulla and was a member of the Clare senior inter-county team in the 1920s and 1930s.
