= Quin (parish) =

Catholic parish in County Clare, Ireland

- Roman Catholic parish
- Location in Ireland
- Coordinates: 52°49′5.88″N 8°51′55.29″W
- Country: Ireland
- Province: Munster
- County: County Clare
- Time zone: UTC+0 (WET)
  - Summer (DST): UTC-1 (IST (WEST))

Quin, also known as Quin & Clooney, is a parish in County Clare, Ireland, and part of the Abbey grouping of parishes within the Roman Catholic Diocese of Killaloe.

Current (2022) co-parish priest is Fr Tom Ryan.

The present parish contains the mediaeval parishes of Quin and Clooney, that were administered together since the seventeenth century.

== Churches ==
The main church is the St. Mary's Church in Quin. Building of this church started in 1836, to be completed in 1837. The interior was finished in 1856.

The second church in the parish is the Church of Pope John XXIII in the village Clooney. This church was built in 1975 and replaced an older chapel on that site. First there was an eighteenth century mass house here, that was replaced by a small chapel in 1801. An attempt in 1820 to replace that chapel was thwarted by the local landlord. Instead, the building was enlarged in 1839.

The third church of the parish is a chapel named St. Stephen Church in the townland Maghera. It was built in 1932.

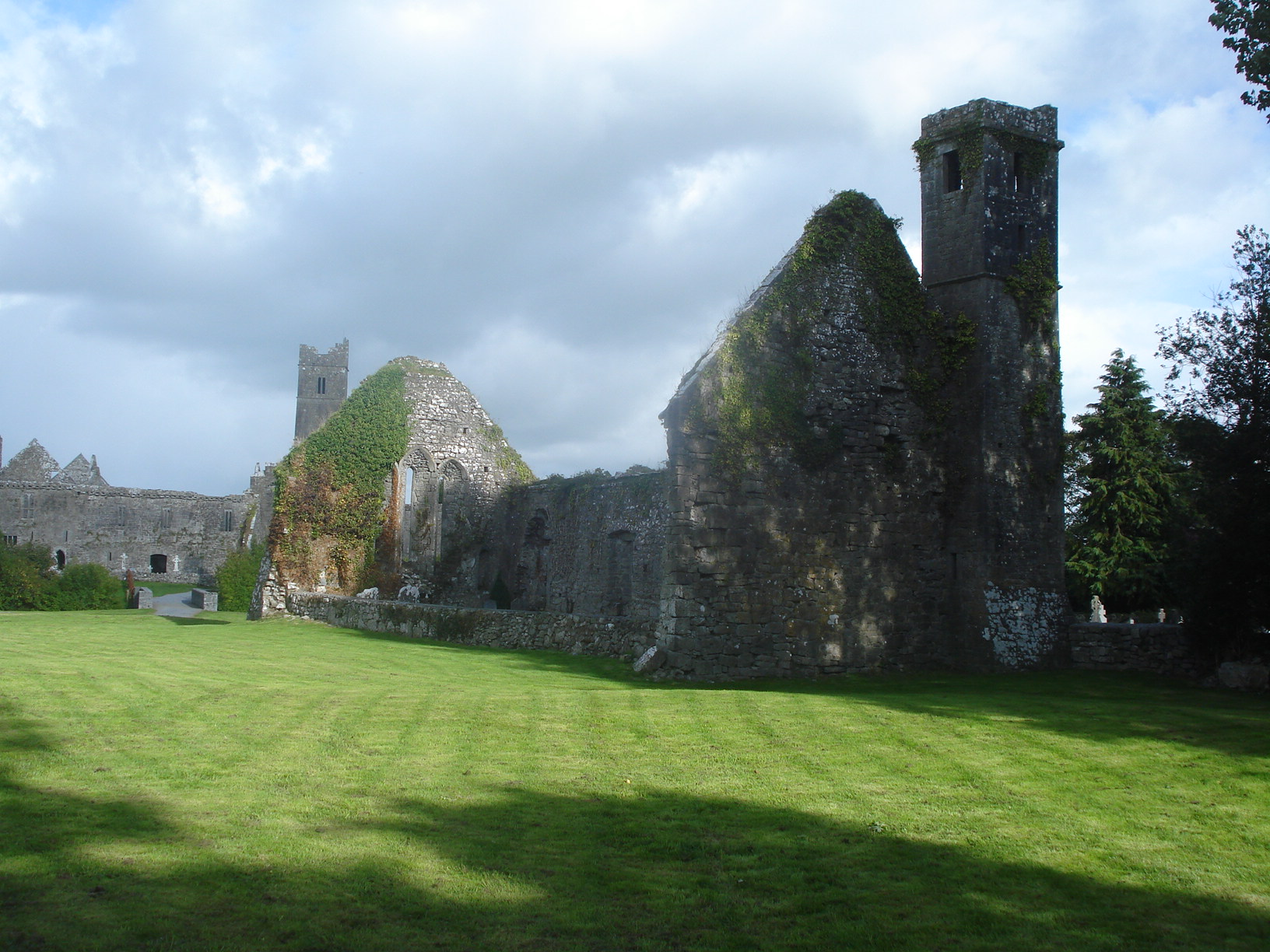
Old parish church near Quin Abbey

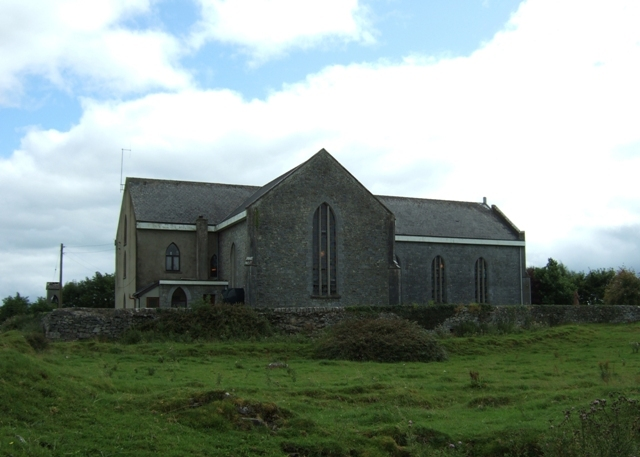
St. Mary's Church, Quin

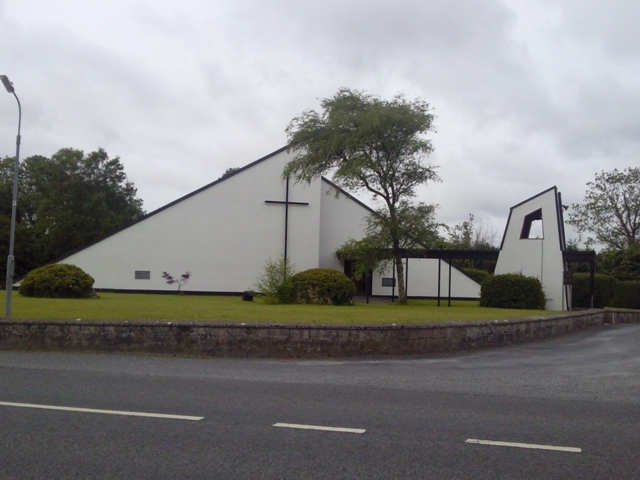
Church of Pope John XXIII, Clooney
