= Matthew Whelan (hurler) =

Irish hurler

Personal information
- Native name: Maitiú Ó Faoileáin (Irish)
- Born: 1 February 1988 (age 38) Borris-in-Ossory, County Laois, Ireland
- Occupation: Secondary school teacher
- Height: 6 ft 1 in (185 cm)

Sport
- Sport: Hurling
- Position: Centre-back
Clubs
- Years: Club
- Borris-in-Ossory; Borris-in-Ossory/Kilcotton
Club titles
- Laois titles: 1
College
- Years: College
- University of Limerick
College titles
- Fitzgibbon titles: 0
Inter-county*
Years	County	Apps (scores)
2007-2021	Laois	42 (0-29)
Inter-county titles
- Leinster titles: 0
- All-Irelands: 0
- NHL: 0
- All Stars: 0
- *Inter County team apps and scores correct as of 18:11, 26 June 2021.

Matthew Whelan (born 1 February 1988) is an Irish hurler who plays for Laois Senior Championship club Borris-in-Ossory/Kilcotton. He is a former member of the Laois senior hurling team.

== Career ==
Whelan first came to Gaelic games prominence at juvenile and underage levels with the Borris-in-Ossory club, before eventually joining the club's top adult team. After the creation of the new Borris-in-Ossory/Kilcotton club, he went on to win a County Senior Championship in 2016, having earlier won three intermediate titles. Whelan first played at inter-county level as a dual player with the Laois minor teams. He won a Leinster Minor Championship title in 2005, before winning an All-Ireland Schools' Championship title in 2006. Whelan was straight out of the minor grade when he made his Laois senior hurling team debut in 2007. Over the course of the following 15 seasons, he became a first-team regular and had two spells as team captain, while he also won a Joe McDonagh Cup medal and two National League Division 2 titles. Whelan retired from inter-county hurling on 25 July 2021, having made a record number of appearances for Laois.

== Career statistics ==
Team	Year	National League			McDonagh Cup		Leinster		All-Ireland		Total	
Team	Year	Division	Apps	Score	Apps	Score	Apps	Score	Apps	Score	Apps	Score
Laois	2007	Division 2A	9	1-09	—		1	0-00	3	0-02	13	1-11
Laois	2008	Division 1B	5	0-01	—		0	0-00	0	0-00	5	0-01
Laois	2009	Division 2	7	0-00	—		1	0-00	1	0-00	9	0-00
Laois	2010	Division 2	6	0-07	—		2	0-05	1	0-00	9	0-12
Laois	2011	Division 2	7	0-02	—		1	0-02	1	0-02	9	0-06
Laois	2012	Division 1B	6	0-03	—		2	0-02	1	0-00	9	0-05
Laois	2013	Division 2A	6	0-16	—		3	0-07	1	0-00	10	0-23
Laois	2014	Division 1B	6	0-07	—		5	0-03	1	0-02	12	0-12
Laois	2015	Division 1B	4	0-00	—		5	0-00	1	0-01	10	0-01
Laois	2016	Division 1B	7	0-01	—		1	0-00	1	0-01	9	0-02
Laois	2017	Division 1B	2	0-00	—		4	0-00	2	0-01	8	0-01
Laois	2018	Division 1B	6	0-00	5	0-01	—		—		11	0-01
Laois	2019	Division 1B	6	0-00	5	0-02	—		2	0-00	13	0-02
Laois	2020	Division 1B	3	0-00	—		0	0-00	0	0-00	3	0-00
Laois	2021	Division 1B	4	0-00	—		1	0-01	1	0-00	6	0-01
Career total			84	1-46	10	0-03	26	0-20	16	0-09	136	1-78

== Honours ==
St Fergal's College

- All-Ireland Senior Vocational Schools' Championship: 2006

Borris-in-Ossory

- Laois Intermediate Hurling Championship: 2009

Borris-in-Ossory/Kilcotton GAA

- Laois Senior Hurling Championship: 2016
- Laois Intermediate Hurling Championship: 2012, 2014

Laois

- Joe McDonagh Cup: 2019
- National Hurling League Division 2A: 2013
- National Hurling League Division 2: 2007
- Leinster Minor Football Championship: 2005

Ireland

- Shinty-Hurling International Series: 2015 (c)

Sporting positions
Preceded by Willie Hyland	Laois senior hurling team captain 2013-2014	Succeeded by Joe Fitzpatrick
Preceded by Eoin Reilly	Ireland national hurling team captain 2016	Succeeded by Eoin Reilly
