= 2007 National Hurling League =

76th season of the National Hurling League

League details
- Dates: 18 February – 29 April 2007
- Teams: 33

League champions
- Winners: Waterford (2nd win)
- Captain: Michael "Brick" Walsh
- Manager: Justin McCarthy

League runners-up
- Runners-up: Kilkenny
- Captain: Henry Shefflin
- Manager: Brian Cody

Other division winners
- Division 2: Laois
- Division 3: Roscommon
- Division 3 Shield: Fermanagh

The 2007 National Hurling League was the 76th season of the National Hurling League, the top leagues for inter-county hurling teams, since its establishment in 1925. The fixtures were announced on 28 November 2006. The season began on 18 February 2007 and concluded on 29 April 2007.

== Division 1A ==
National Hurling League Division 1
- Season: 2007
- Champions: Waterford; 2nd National League title Captain: Michael Walsh; Manager: Justin McCarthy
- Relegated: Down
- Matches: 36
- Top goalscorer: Eoin Kelly (1-61)
- Best goalkeeper: Brian Murray; P. J. Ryan (4 clean sheets)
- Biggest home win: Wexford 3-31 - 0-6 Down (1 April 2007)
- Biggest away win: Down 1-13 - 3-25 Clare (18 February 2007)
- Highest scoring: Limerick 6-20 - 1-18 Offaly (8 April 2007)
- All statistics correct as of 19 February 2016.

Kilkenny came into the season as defending champions of the 2006 season. Dublin entered Division 1 as the promoted team.

On 29 April 2007, Waterford won the title after a 0-20 to 0-18 win over Kilkenny. It was their first league title since 1963 and their second National League title overall.

Antrim and Down were the first two teams to be relegated to Division 2 after finishing bottom of Divisions 1A and 1B respectively. Offaly were the third team to be relegated after being beaten by Limerick in a play-off. Antrim and Offaly subsequently earned reprieves and retain their Division 1 status as the proposed restructuring of the 2008 league was scrapped.

Waterford's Eoin Kelly was the Division 1 top scorer with 1-61. Limerick's Brian Murray and Kilkenny's P. J. Ryan were the top goalkeepers having kept 4 clean sheets.

=== Structure ===
A total of 12 teams contested the top division of the league, including 11 sides from the 2006 season and one promoted from the 2006 National League Division 2. On 30 April 2006, Dublin earned promotion from the 2006 National League Division 2 after a one-year absence from the top flight. They were crowned Division 2 champions after beating Kerry. They replaced Laois who were relegated to Division 2 at the end of the previous season.

The 12 teams in Division 1 were divided into two groups of six team - 1A and 1B. Each team played all the others in its group once, earning 2 points for a win and 1 for a draw. The first-placed teams in 1A and 1B advanced to the league semi-finals. The second and third-placed teams in 1A and 1B advanced to the league quarter-finals.

=== Division 1A table ===
| Pos | Team | Pld | W | D | L | F | A | Pts | Notes |
|---|---|---|---|---|---|---|---|---|---|
| 1 | Cork | 5 | 4 | 0 | 1 | 4-73 | 3-67 | 8 | |
| 2 | Waterford | 5 | 3 | 0 | 2 | 6-94 | 6-59 | 6 | Division 1 champions |
| 3 | Wexford | 5 | 3 | 0 | 2 | 6-89 | 4-67 | 6 | |
| 4 | Clare | 5 | 2 | 1 | 2 | 6-78 | 3-63 | 5 | |
| 5 | Offaly | 5 | 1 | 1 | 3 | 9-74 | 5-83 | 3 | |
| 6 | Down | 5 | 0 | 0 | 5 | 5-42 | 15-111 | 0 | |

Group stage

| 18 February 2007 Round 1 | Cork | 1-21 - 1-14 | Offaly | Páirc Uí Chaoimh, Cork |
| | K Murphy (0-5, one free, one 65), E Murphy (1-1), N Ronan (0-4, three frees), J Deane (0-3, one free), T Kenny (0-3), N McCarthy (0-3), T McCarthy (0-1), D O'Sullivan (0-1). | Report | J Bergin (0-7, free), D Molloy (1-1), S Dooley (0-2), G Hannify (0-1), R Hanniffy (0-1), E Bevans (0-1), C Parlon (0-1). | Referee: M Wadding(Waterford) |

| 18 February 2007 Round 1 | Wexford | 1-12 - 1-23 | Waterford | Wexford Park, Wexford |
| | M Jacob (0-5, two frees), E Quigley (1-1), D Fitzhenry (0-1, a pen), S Nolan (0-1), P Roche (0-1), M Jordan (0-1), R Codd (0-1), R Jacob (0-1). | Report | E Kelly (0-10, five frees), K Moran (1-2), S Molumphy (0-3), S Prendergast (0-3), J Mullane (0-2), D Shanahan (0-2), J Kennedy (0-1). | Referee: É Morris (Dublin) |

| 18 February 2007 Round 1 | Down | 1-13 - 3-25 | Clare | St.Patrick's Park, Portaferry |
| | G Johnson (0-7, all frees), M Coulter (1-0, free), A Savage (0-2), E Trainor (0-2), P Hughes (0-1), E McGuinness (0-1). | Report | B Nugent (2-5), B Gaffney (1-2), A Quinn (0-4, all frees), F Lynch (0-4), A Markham (0-4, two 65s, two frees), N Gilligan (0-3, one free), B Bulgar (0-1), T Griffin (0-1), J Clancy (0-1). | Referee: G Devlin (Armagh) |

| 4 March 2007 Round 2 | Clare | 1-10 - 1-12 | Wexford | Cusack Park, Ennis |
| | N Gilligan (0-4, 2f), B Nugent (0-3), B Gaffney (1-0), T Carmody (0-2), J Clancy (0-1). | Report | P Carley (0-4, 2f), R Kehoe (1-0), R Jacob (0-2), M Jacob, E Quigley, S Nolan, M Jordan, R Codd, S Banville (all 0-1 each). | Referee: J Sexton (Cork) |

| 4 March 2007 Round 2 | Offaly | 4-18 - 1-11 | Down | St. Brendan's Park, Birr |
| | J Bergin 2-5 (1-4f); D Molloy 2-0; B Carroll 0-5; G Hanniffy, E Bevans 0-3 each; B Teehan, B Murphy 0-1 each. | Report | G Johnson 0-5 (4f); B McGourty 0-4; E Trainor 1-0; A Savage 0-2. | Referee: F Smith (Meath) |

| 11 March 2007 Round 2 | Waterford | 0-16 - 0-12 | Cork | Walsh Park, Waterford |
| | E Kelly 0-8 (6f), K McGrath 0-4 (2 65s, 2f), S Prendergast 0-2, M Walsh, K Moran 0-1 each. | Report | N McCarthy, P Cronin 0-3 each, J Deane 0-2 (2f), N Ronan, R Curran, D O'Sullivan and P O'Sullivan 0-1 each | Referee: B Gavin (Offaly) |

| 18 March 2007 Round 3 | Wexford | 1-16 - 1-11 | Offaly | Wexford Park, Wexford |
| | P Carley 1-4, E Quigley 0-5, R Jacob 0-4, S Banville 0-2, D Lyng 0-1. | Report | J Bergin 1-1, S Hanniffy 0-3, B Carroll 0-1, D Molloy 0-1, A Egan 0-1, B Teehan 0-1, R Hanniffy 0-1, P Cleary 0-1, D Franks 0-1. | Referee: S Roche (Tipperary) |

| 18 March 2007 Round 3 | Clare | 1-13 - 0-9 | Waterford | Cusack Park, Ennis |
| | B Gaffney 1-4 (0-4f), B Nugent, N Gilligan (2f) 0-3 each, F Lynch, T Carmody, K Dilleen 0-1 each. | Report | E Kelly 0-3 (3f), D Shanahan, S Molumphy, S Prendergast, K McGrath (‘65'), N Jacob, J Nagle 0-1 each. | Referee: J Ryan (Tipperary) |

| 18 March 2007 Round 3 | Down | 2-5 - 1-10 | Cork | Mitchel Park, Ballygalget |
| | G Johnson 1-2, P Coulter 1-0, B McGourty 0-2, A Savage 0-1. | Report | E Murphy 1-0, K Murphy 0-4, J Deane 0-3, P Cronin, T Kenny, C Naughton 0-1 each. | Referee: J O'Rourke (Monaghan) |

| 25 March 2007 Round 4 | Cork | 1-17 - 0-18 | Wexford | Páirc Uí Chaoimh, Cork |
| | N Ronan 0-5 (2f, 1 '65); C Naughton 1-2; J Deane 0-4 (1f); P Cronin 0-2; K Murphy (Sars), N McCarthy, K Murphy (Erins Own) and P Kelly 0-1 each. | Report | R Jacob 0-5; P Carley 0-5 (3f); B Lambert 0-4f; D Lyng 0-2; R Kehoe, M Jacob 0-1 each. | Referee: M Haverty (Galway) |

| 25 March 2007 Round 4 | Offaly | 1-16 - 1-16 | Clare | St. Brendan's Park, Birr |
| | J Bergin 0-5 (4f); D Molloy 1-1; B Carroll, R Hanniffy 0-3 each; P Cleary 0-2f; B Teehan, B Murphy 0-1 each. | Report | B Gaffney 1-8 (4f and 1 '65); F Lynch 0-4; N Gilligan 0-2 (1f); B Nugent, T Carmody 0-1 each. | Referee: P O'Connor (Limerick) |

| 25 March 2007 Round 4 | Waterford | 4-27 - 1-7 | Down | Fraher Field, Dungarvan |
| | S Molumphy 2-2, K McGrath 1-4, E Kelly 0-7, D Bennett 0-4, J Nagle 1-0, E McGrath 0-3, D Shanahan 0-3, M Walsh 0-2, S Prendergast 0-2. | | E Trainor 1-1, B McGourty 0-3, G Johnson 0-1, F Conway 0-1, P Coulter 0-1. | Referee: J Owens (Wexford) |

| 1 April 2007 Round 5 | Clare | 0-14 - 1-13 | Cork | Cusack Park, Ennis |
| | N Ronan 1-2 (0-1f), J Deane 0-5 (2f, 1 '65), P Cronin 0-2, T Kenny 0-2, K Murphy 0-2. | Report | B Gaffney 0-6 (6f), B Nugent 0-2, K Dilleen, B Bugler, D O'Rourke, F Lynch, N Gilligan, T Carmody 0-1 each. | Referee: D Richardson (Limerick) |

| 1 April 2007 Round 5 | Waterford | 1-19 - 3-15 | Offaly | Walsh Park, Waterford |
| | E Kelly 0-8, J Mullane 1-3, K McGrath 0-4, D Shanahan 0-1, S Molumphy 0-1, S Prendergast 0-1, J Kennedy 0-1. | | J Bergin 2-5, G Hanniffy 1-1, E Bevans 0-3, R Hanniffy 0-2, B Teehan 0-2, B Carroll 0-1, B Murphy 0-1. | Referee: S McMahon (Clare) |

| 1 April 2007 Round 5 | Wexford | 3-31 - 0-6 | Down | Wexford Park, Wexford |
| | R Jacob 1-7; B Lambert 0-8, 5f; D Stamp 2-1; M Jacob 0-5; D Lyng 0-3; R McCarthy 0-2; W Doran, D Fitzhenry f, P Roche, K Kavanagh, M Doyle 0-1 each. | Report | B McGourty 0-3; P Hughes f, C Courtney, G Johnson 0-1 each. | Referee: D Copps (Cork) |

== Division 1B ==
=== Division 1B table ===
| Pos | Team | Pld | W | D | L | F | A | Pts | Notes |
|---|---|---|---|---|---|---|---|---|---|
| 1 | Kilkenny | 5 | 3 | 1 | 1 | 7-89 | 5-67 | 7 | Division 1 runners-up |
| 2 | Galway | 5 | 3 | 0 | 2 | 4-94 | 7-60 | 6 | |
| 3 | Tipperary | 5 | 3 | 0 | 2 | 11-68 | 5-69 | 6 | |
| 4 | Dublin | 5 | 2 | 1 | 2 | 5-63 | 7-70 | 5 | |
| 5 | Limerick | 5 | 2 | 0 | 3 | 8-66 | 2-85 | 4 | |
| 6 | Antrim | 5 | 1 | 0 | 4 | 1-57 | 10-86 | 2 | |

Group stage

| 18 February 2007 Round 1 | Dublin | 2-13 - 0-19 | Kilkenny | Parnell Park, Dublin |
| | K O'Reilly (1-3, 1-0 pen, 0-2 frees), J Kelly (1-1), J McCaffrey (0-3, one sideline), D Curtin (0-3, one 65, two frees), K Flynn (0-2), L Ryan (0-1). | Report | E Larkin (0-6, five frees), E Brennan (0-6), W O'Dwyer (0-3), E McCormack (0-2), M Comerford (0-1), A Fogarty (0-1). | Referee: J McGrath (Westmeath) |

| 18 February 2007 Round 1 | Tipperary | 0-16 - 2-13 | Limerick | MacDonagh Park, Nenagh |
| | E Kelly (0-12, seven frees, two 65s), L Corbett (0-3), P Kelly (0-1). | Report | A O'Shaughnessy (1-8, eight frees), O Moran (1-1), N Moran (0-2), M O'Brien (0-1), B Foley (0-1). | Referee: D Murphy(Wexford) |

| 18 February 2007 Round 1 | Galway | 3-25 - 0-12 | Antrim | Pearse Stadium, Galway |
| | E Cloonan 1-10 (4f, 3 '65), K Broderick 1-3, N Healy 0-4, D Tierney 1-0, R Murray 0-3 (1f), A Kerins and M Kerins 0-2 each, D Hayes 0-1. | Report | L Watson 0-3 (1f), K McKeegan, B Herron and M Herron 0-2 each, P Richmond and N McAuley 0-1 each, J Campbell 0-1 ('65). | Referee: B Kelly (Westmeath) |

| 4 March 2007 Round 2 | Kilkenny | 2-13 - 3-13 | Tipperary | Nowlan Park, Kilkenny |
| | R Power 0-7 (5f), E Brennan 1-1, M Comerford 1-0, E McCormack, B Hogan, J Dalton (65) 0-1 each. | Report | D O'Hanlon 2-1, P Kelly 1-3, E Kelly 0-6 (6f), J Carroll 0-2, B Dunne 0-1. | Referee: B Kelly (Westmeath) |

| 4 March 2007 Round 2 | Limerick | 1-9 - 0-17 | Galway | Gaelic Grounds, Limerick |
| | S O'Connor 1-1, A O'Shaughnessy 0-3 (3f), JV O'Brien 0-2, C Fitzgerald, P Tobin, B Geary (1f) 0-1 each. | Report | E Cloonan 0-9 (6f), D Hayes, K Broderick 0-2 each, N Healy, F Healy, A Kerins, R Murray 0-1 each. | Referee: D Kirwan (Cork) |

| 28 March 2007 Round 2 | Antrim | 1-13 - 0-12 | Dublin | Casement Park, Belfast |
| | N McManus 1-3; B McFall 0-5 (4f); P Shields, J McIntosh (2f) 0-2 each; M Herron 0-1. | Report | K O'Reilly 0-8 (6f); K Dunne 0-2; K Flynn, P O'Driscoll 0-1 each. | Referee: G Devlin (Armagh) |

| 18 March 2007 Round 3 | Dublin | 2-7 - 1-8 | Galway | Parnell Park, Dublin |
| | P O'Driscoll 1-2, L Ryan 1-0, D Curtin 0-2 (f), K Flynn, S Mullen, K O'Reilly 0-1 each. | Report | N Healy 1-3 (1f), A Kerins, E Cloonan 0-2 each, M Kerins 0-1 (f) | Referee: D Murphy (Wexford) |

| 18 March 2007 Round 3 | Tipperary | 1-11 - 0-8 | Antrim | Páirc Shíleáin, Templemore |
| | E Kelly 0-7, P Bourke 1-1, W Ryan, C O Mahoney 0-1 each. | Report | B McFall 0-4, K McKeegan 0-3, B Herron 0-1. | Referee: J O'Mahoney (Limerick) |

| 19 March 2007 Round 3 | Kilkenny | 2-17 - 0-12 | Limerick | Nowlan Park, Kilkenny |
| | R Power 0-6, M Comerford 1-2, D Lyng 1-0, E McCormack 0-3, M Rice 0-2, E Brennan 0-1, A Fogarty 0-1, E Larkin 0-1, P Cleere 0-1. | | A O'Shaughnessy 0-5, N Moran 0-4, M Fitzgerald 0-1, Mike O'Brien 0-1, K Tobin 0-1. | Referee: A Heagney (Clare) |

| 25 March 2007 Round 4 | Limerick | 1-15 - 0-22 | Dublin | Gaelic Grounds, Limerick |
| | A O'Shaughnessy 0-4, S O'Connor 1-0, O Moran 0-3, P Tobin 0-2, Mike O'Brien 0-2, M Fitzgerald 0-1, D Ryan 0-1, B Foley 0-1, D O'Grady 0-1. | | K O'Reilly 0-7, J Kelly 0-4, K Flynn 0-3, P O'Driscoll 0-2, J Boland 0-2, G O'Meara 0-1, S Mullen 0-1, D Qualter 0-1, D O'Reilly 0-1. | Referee: C McAllister (Cork) |

| 25 March 2007 Round 4 | Galway | 0-26 - 3-13 | Tipperary | Pearse Stadium, Galway |
| | E Cloonan 0-10 (8f, 1 '65); M Kerins 0-4; I Tannion 0-3; A Kerins, R Murray, N Healy, D Hayes 0-2 each; F Healy 0-1. | Report | P Kelly 2-2; W Ryan 0-6f; E Kelly 1-0; E Corcoran 0-2 (2 sidelines); H Moloney, R O'Dwyer, P Bourke all 0-1 each. | Referee: M Wadding (Waterford) |

| 25 March 2007 Round 4 | Kilkenny | 2-21 - 0-11 | Antrim | Nowlan Park, Kilkenny |
| | E Brennan 1-4; M Comerford 1-3; A Fogarty 0-5; R Power 0-4; D Lyng 0-3; E McCormick, J Dalton 0-1 each. | Report | B McFall 0-8f; M Herron 0-3. | Referee: J Owens (Wexford) |

| 1 April 2007 Round 5 | Kilkenny | 1-19 - 0-18 | Galway | Nowlan Park, Kilkenny |
| | R Power 0-7, E McCormack 1-1, E Brennan 0-3, D Lyng 0-2, M Rice 0-2, E Larkin 0-1, M Comerford 0-1, J Tennyson 0-1, T Walsh 0-1. | | E Cloonan 0-7, R Murray 0-2, D Collins 0-2, A Kerins 0-2, F Healy 0-1, K Broderick 0-1, D Tierney 0-1, I Tannian 0-1, T Óg Regan 0-1. | Referee: B Gavin (Offaly) |

| 1 April 2007 Round 5 | Tipperary | 4-15 - 1-9 | Dublin | MacDonagh Park, Nenagh |
| | D O'Hanlon 2-1, E Kelly 1-3 (0-2f), P Bourke 0-5 (2f), P Kelly 1-2, B Dunne, S McGrath, T Stapleton, J Carroll 0-1. | Report | S Mullen 0-5 (4f), E Carroll 1-1 (1-0f), R Fallon 0-2 (2f), K Flynn 0-1. | Referee: D Connolly (Kilkenny) |

| 1 April 2007 Round 5 | Limerick | 4-17 - 0-13 | Antrim | Gaelic Grounds, Limerick |
| | S O'Connor 3-0, B Foley 1-4, A O'Shaughnessy 0-7, E Foley 0-2, B Geary 0-1, H Flavin 0-1, O Moran 0-1, B Begley 0-1. | | K McKeegan 0-6, M Herron 0-2, P Richmond 0-2, J McIntosh 0-1, N McManus 0-1, B McFall 0-1. | Referee: J McGrath (Meath) |

== Division 1 Knockout ==
Relegation play-off

| 8 April 2007 Relegation play-off | Limerick | 6-20 - 1-18 | Offaly | MacDonagh Park, Nenagh |
| | S O'Connor 2-3; B Foley 2-0; A O'Shaughnessy 1-4 (1-0 pen, 2f); O Moran 1-3; B Geary 0-4 (2 '65', 2f); J O'Brien 0-2; B Begley, M O'Brien, D Ryan, N Moran 0-1 each. | Report | J Bergin 1-8 (4f, 0-1 pen); R Hanniffy 0-3, E Bevans, S Dooley, B Carroll 0-2 each; D Molloy 0-1. | Referee: J Ryan (Tipperary) |

Quarter-finals

| 8 April 2007 Quarter-final | Wexford | 1-16 - 0-14 | Galway | Nowlan Park, Kilkenny |
| | E Quigley 1-1, S Nolan 0-3, D Lyng, R Jacob, M Jacob, P Carley 0-2 each, W Doran, D Stamp, B Lambert (1f), M Jordan 0-1 each. | Report | E Cloonan 0-6 (2f), I Tannian 0-4, A Kerins 0-2, D Hayes, N Healy 0-1 each. | Referee: S McMahon (Clare) |

| 8 April 2007 Quarter-final | Waterford | 1-20 - 1-19 | Tipperary | Nowlan Park, Kilkenny |
| | E Kelly 1-9 (6f, 2 '65s), D Shanahan 0-3, J Mullane 0-3, S Prendergast 0-2, J Kennedy 0-2 (1 lineball), S O'Sullivan 0-1. | Report | E Kelly 0-7 (6f, 1 '65'), P Kelly 1-1, L Corbett 0-4, W Ryan 0-3 (1f), R O'Dwyer 0-2, J Carroll, E Corcoran (lineball) 0-1. | Referee: M Haverty (Galway) |

Semi-finals

| 15 April 2007 Semi-final | Cork | 1-16 - 1-19 | Waterford | Semple Stadium, Thurles |
| | B O'Connor 1-5 (4f, 1 s-line), P Cronin 0-3, J Gardiner 0-3 (2f, 1 '65), N McCarthy 0-2, J O'Connor, K Murphy, C Naughton 0-1 each. | Report | E Kelly 0-8 (5f), D Shanahan 1-1, S Prendergast, S Walsh, J Mullane, J Kennedy 0-2 each, K McGrath 0-2 (2f). | Referee: B Kelly (Westmeath) |

| 15 April 2007 Semi-final | Kilkenny | 2-22 - 2-7 | Wexford | Semple Stadium, Thurles |
| | R Power 0-9 (4f, 2 '65s), A Fogarty 2-1, E Larkin, J Fitzpatrick 0-3 each, M Comerford, D Lyng, E Brennan 0-2 each. | Report | D Stamp 2-0, D Lyng, P Carley (2f) 0-2 each, R Jacob, M Jacob, E Quigley 0-1 each. | Referee: D Kirwan (Cork) |

Final

| 29 April 2007 Final | Kilkenny | 0-18 - 0-20 | Waterford | Semple Stadium, Thurles |
| | H Shefflin (0-12, 6f, 1 '65'), R Power (0-2), M Comerford (0-2), E Brennan (0-1), D Lyng (0-1), | Report | E Kelly (0-8, 6f), K McGrath (0-3, 1f), S Prendergast (0-3), J Mullane (0-2), P Flynn (0-1), E McGrath (0-1), D Shanahan (0-1), J Kennedy (0-1). | Attendance: 22,235 |

=== Top scorers ===
Overall

| Rank | Player | Team | Tally | Total | Matches | Average |
|---|---|---|---|---|---|---|
| 1 | Eoin Kelly | Waterford | 1-61 | 64 | 8 | 8.0 |
| 2 | Joe Bergin | Offaly | 6-31 | 49 | 6 | 7.6 |
| 3 | Eugene Cloonan | Galway | 1-44 | 47 | 6 | 7.8 |
| 4 | Eoin Kelly | Tipperary | 2-35 | 41 | 6 | 6.8 |
| 5 | Andrew O'Shaughnessy | Limerick | 2-31 | 37 | 6 | 6.1 |
| 6 | Richie Power | Kilkenny | 0-35 | 35 | 6 | 5.8 |

Single game

| Rank | Player | Team | Tally | Total | Opposition |
|---|---|---|---|---|---|
| 1 | Eugene Cloonan | Galway | 1-10 | 13 | Antrim |
| 2 | Eoin Kelly | Waterford | 1-9 | 12 | Tipperary |
| 2 | Henry Shefflin | Kilkenny | 0-12 | 12 | Waterford |
| 2 | Eoin Kelly | Tipperary | 0-12 | 12 | Limerick |
| 5 | Barry Nugent | Clare | 2-5 | 11 | Down |
| 5 | Joe Bergin | Offaly | 2-5 | 11 | Down |
| 5 | Joe Bergin | Offaly | 2-5 | 11 | Waterford |
| 5 | Bernard Gaffney | Clare | 1-8 | 11 | Offaly |
| 5 | Andrew O'Shaughnessy | Limerick | 1-8 | 11 | Tipperary |
| 5 | Joe Bergin | Offaly | 1-8 | 11 | Limerick |

Clean sheets

| Rank | Goalkeeper | Team | Clean sheets |
|---|---|---|---|
| 1 | Brian Murray | Limerick | 4 |
| 1 | P. J. Ryan | Kilkenny | 4 |
| 3 | Donal Óg Cusack | Cork | 3 |
| 4 | Greg Kennedy | Tipperary | 2 |
| 4 | Damien Fitzhenry | Wexford | 2 |
| 6 | Clinton Hennessy | Waterford | 1 |
| 6 | Philip Brennan | Clare | 1 |
| 6 | Gary Maguire | Dublin | 1 |
| 6 | Aidan Ryan | Galway | 1 |
| 6 | Ryan McGarry | Antrim | 1 |

== Division 2 ==
National Hurling League Division 2
- Season: 2006
- Champions: Laois; Captain: Joe FitzPatrick; Manager: Damien Fox
- Promoted: Laois
- Relegated: Meath; Carlow; Armagh; Mayo; London
- Matches: 30
- Biggest home win: Laois 3-26 - 2-9 Derry (18 February 2007); Wicklow 5-13 - 0-8 Armagh (25 March 2007)
- Biggest away win: Armagh 1-5 - 3-15 Laois (18 March 2007)
- Highest scoring: Westmeath 2-20 - 3-18 Laois (15 April 2007)
- All statistics correct as of 19 February 2016.

On 29 April 2007, Laois won the title after a 2-19 to 0-8 win over Wicklow. It was their first league title since 1965 and their third National League Division 2 title overall.

Meath, Carlow, Armagh, Mayo and London were relegated to Division 3 as the bottom placed teams of Divisions 2A and 2B. All of these teams subsequently earned reprieves and retained their Division 2 status as the proposed restructuring of the 2008 league was scrapped.

=== Structure ===
A total of 11 teams contested the second division of the league, including 9 sides from the 2006 season and one relegated from the 2006 National League Division 1 and one promoted from the 2006 National League Division 3.

On 30 April 2006, Armagh earned promotion from the 2006 National League Division 3. They were crowned Division 3 champions after beating Longford. They replaced Roscommon who were relegated to Division 3 at the end of the previous season. On the same day, Laois were relegated from the 2006 National League Division 1. They replaced Dublin who were promoted to Division 1 at the end of the previous season.

The 11 teams in Division 2 were divided into two groups - 2A which consisted of six teams and 2B which consisted of five teams. Each team played all the others in its group once, earning 2 points for a win and 1 for a draw. The first-placed teams in 2A and 2B advanced to the league semi-finals. The second and third-placed teams in 2A and 2B advanced to the league quarter-finals.

=== Division 2A ===
| Pos | Team | Pld | W | D | L | F | A | Pts | Notes |
|---|---|---|---|---|---|---|---|---|---|
| 1 | Wicklow | 5 | 5 | 0 | 0 | 12-67 | 4-61 | 10 | Division 2 runners-up |
| 2 | Laois | 5 | 3 | 1 | 1 | 11-82 | 8-40 | 7 | Division 2 champions |
| 3 | Derry | 5 | 2 | 1 | 2 | 13-62 | 7-75 | 5 | |
| 4 | Meath | 5 | 2 | 1 | 2 | 5-62 | 8-72 | 5 | |
| 5 | Carlow | 5 | 2 | 1 | 2 | 7-56 | 8-69 | 5 | |
| 6 | Armagh | 5 | 0 | 0 | 5 | 1-53 | 14-65 | 0 | |

Group stage

| 18 February 2007 Round 1 | Armagh | 0-17 - 2-12 | Carlow | Garard McGleenan Park, Keady |
| | B Lawler 1-6, C Doyle 1-0, J Kavanagh 0-2, R Foley 0-2, S Murphy 0-1, S Kavanagh 0-1. | | D Coulter 0-8 (4f, ‘65), G Enright 0-4, C Christie 0-3, P McCormack 0-1. | Referee: T McIntyre (Antrim) |

| 18 February 2007 Round 1 | Laois | 3-26 - 2-9 | Derry | O'Moore Park, Portlaoise |
| | N Costello 0-9, W Hyland 1-3, T Fitzgerald 1-2, P Russell 1-2, J Brophy 0-3, J Young 0-3, S Dollard 0-2, J Fitzpatrick 0-1, D McGill 0-1. | | S McBride 2-7, O McCluskey 0-1, P McGlade 0-1. | Referee: J Ryan (Tipperary) |

| 18 February 2007 Round 1 | Meath | 0-11 - 0-17 | Wicklow | Páirc Tailteann, Navan |
| | M Horan 0-10 (7f, 1 65), J Farrell 0-1. | | J O’Neill 0-9 (7f), E Glynn 0-3, A Tiernan 0-2 (1 sideline), D Hyland 0-1, D Moran 0-1, S Furlong 0-1. | Referee: B Gavin (Offaly) |

| 4 March 2007 Round 2 | Derry | 2-13 - 0-9 | Armagh | Celtic Park, Derry |
| | S McBride 2-1 (2-0 sidelines, 1f), G O'Kane 0-7f, L Hinphey 0-3 (2 '65s), K Hinphey 0-2. | | D Coulter 0-4f, B McCann 0-2, G Enright 0-1, R Gaffney 0-1, P Breen 0-1. | Referee: T McIntyre (Antrim) |

| 4 March 2007 Round 2 | Wicklow | 2-12 - 1-12 | Laois | Pearse Park, Arklow |
| | J O'Neill 0-7, W O'Gorman 2-0, D Hyland 0-2, J Murphy (f) 0-1, L Glynn 0-1, S Furlong 0-1. | | T Fitzgerald 1-1, J Young 0-2, N Costello 0-2, S Dwyer 0-2, C Dunne 0-1, J Fitzpatrick 0-1, W Hyland 0-1, S Dollard 0-1, D Carter 0-1. | Referee: D Murphy (Wexford) |

| 10 March 2007 Round 2 | Carlow | 2-14 - 1-18 | Meath | Páirc Uí Bhriain, Carlow |
| | B Lawler 0-7 (7f), S Murphy 1-1, S Kavanagh 1-1 (both f), R Coady 0-1, R Dunbar 0-1, J Coady 0-1. | | M Cole 1-11 (1pen, 0-8f), E Brislane 0-3, S Clynch 0-2, P Durnin 0-1, G O'Neill 0-1. | Referee: J Ryan (Tipperary) |

| 18 March 2007 Round 3 | Armagh | 1-5 - 3-15 | Laois | Garard McGleenan Park, Keady |
| | D Coulter 1-3 (all frees), K Christie 0-1, C McAlinden 0-1. | | P Russell 1-5, J Young 1-3 (1-0 pen, 1 '65'), J Brophy 0-5, T Fitzgerald 1-0, M Whelan 0-1, W Hyland 0-1. | Referee: J McGrath (Westmeath) |

| 18 March 2007 Round 3 | Carlow | 1-8 - 2-14 | Wicklow | Dr. Cullen Park, Carlow |

| 18 March 2007 Round 3 | Meath | 0-16 - 2-10 | Derry | Páirc Tailteann, Navan |

| 25 March 2007 Round 4 | Wicklow | 5-13 - 0-8 | Armagh | Pearse Park, Arklow |

| 25 March 2007 Round 4 | Laois | 4-17 - 2-5 | Meath | O'Moore Park, Portlaoise |

| 25 March 2007 Round 4 | Derry | 5-18 - 1-12 | Carlow | Fr. McNally Park, Feeny |

| 1 April 2007 Round 5 | Carlow | 1-9 - 0-12 | Laois | Dr. Cullen Park, Carlow |

| 1 April 2007 Round 5 | Meath | 2-12 - 0-14 | Armagh | Páirc Tailteann, Navan |

| 1 April 2007 Round 5 | Wicklow | 3-11 - 2-12 | Derry | Pearse Park, Arklow |

=== Division 2B ===
| Pos | Team | Pld | W | D | L | F | A | Pts | Notes |
|---|---|---|---|---|---|---|---|---|---|
| 1 | Westmeath | 4 | 3 | 1 | 0 | 9-57 | 4-44 | 7 | |
| 2 | Kildare | 4 | 2 | 1 | 1 | 5-43 | 5-46 | 5 | |
| 3 | Kerry | 4 | 2 | 0 | 2 | 8-39 | 7-45 | 4 | |
| 4 | Mayo | 4 | 1 | 1 | 2 | 2-41 | 4-43 | 3 | |
| 5 | London | 4 | 0 | 1 | 3 | 3-37 | 7-39 | 1 | |

Group stage

| 18 February 2007 Round 1 | Kerry | 3-10 - 1-13 | London | Austin Stack Park, Tralee |

| 18 February 2007 Round 1 | Kildare | 1-10 - 0-11 | Mayo | St. Conleth's Park, Newbridge |

| 4 March 2007 Round 2 | Mayo | 2-13 - 1-8 | Kerry | MacHale Park, Castlebar |

| 4 March 2007 Round 2 | Westmeath | 1-16 - 2-13 | Kildare | Cusack Park, Mullingar |

| 17 March 2007 Round 3 | Kerry | 1-12 - 4-11 | Westmeath | Austin Stack Park, Tralee |

| 18 March 2007 Round 3 | Mayo | 0-6 - 0-6 | London | MacHale Park, Castlebar |

| 25 March 2007 Round 4 | London | 1-10 - 2-12 | Kildare | Emerald GAA Grounds, Ruislip |

| 25 March 2007 Round 4 | Westmeath | 2-19 - 0-11 | Mayo | Cusack Park, Mullingar |

| 1 April 2007 Round 5 | Kildare | 0-8 - 3-9 | Kerry | St. Conleth's Park, Newbridge |

| 1 April 2007 Round 5 | London | 1-8 - 2-11 | Westmeath | Emerald GAA Grounds, Ruislip |

=== Knock-out stage ===
Quarter-finals

| 7 April 2007 Quarter-final | Laois | 4-15 - 4-9 | Kerry | Gaelic Grounds, Limerick |
| | J Phelan (1-4), M Whelan (1-4), T Fitzgerald (1-2), J Brophy (1-0), J Fitzpatrick (0-2), P Russell (0-1), J Young (0-1), M McEvoy (0-1). | Report | JM Dooley (3-1), M Slattery (0-5, 5f), L Boyle (1-0), J Egan (0-1), J Casey (0-1), M Conway (0-1). | Referee: J Owens (Wexford) |

| 8 April 2007 Quarter-final | Derry | 1-12 - 2-17 | Kildare | St. Tiernach's Park, Clones |
| | R Convery 0-8, D McSorley 1-0, G O'Kane 0-2, P McCloskey 0-1, S McBride 0-1, K Hinphey 0-1. | | B White 1-8, B Byrne 1-0, A McAndrew 0-3, K Divilly 0-2, M Dowd 0-1, O Lynch 0-1, C Buggy 0-1. | Referee: J McGrath (Westmeath) |

Semi-finals

| 15 April 2007 Semi-final | Wicklow | 4-12 - 2-17 | Kildare | Dr. Cullen Park, Carlow |
| | J O'Neill 1-7, W O'Gorman 1-1, L Glynn 1-0, Kennedy 1-0, D Hyland 0-2, D Moran 0-1, S Furlong 0-1. | | B White 1-5, O Lynch 1-3, A McAndrew 0-3, P O'Brien 0-3, R Hoban 0-1, K Divilly 0-1, C Buggy 0-1. |

| 15 April 2007 Semi-final | Westmeath | 2-20 - 3-18 | Laois | O'Connor Park, Tullamore |
| | D Carty 0-10, B Murtagh 0-4, R Whelan 1-0, P Dowdall 1-0, B Smyth 0-3, J Shaw 0-1, L Smith 0-1, D McNicholas 0-1. | | J Young 1-5, T Fitzgerald 2-2, E Jackman 0-3, M Whelan 0-3, W Hyland 0-2, J Brophy 0-2, J Phelan 0-1. |

Final

| 29 April 2007 Final | Wicklow | 0-8 - 2-19 | Laois | Semple Stadium, Thurles |
| | J O'Neill 0-4, A Tiernan 0-2, J Keogh 0-1, D Hyland 0-1. | | J Young 0-10, W Hyland 0-4, J Brophy 1-0, N Costello 1-0, Jason Phelan 0-2, E Jackman 0-1, P Russell 0-1, Joe Phelan 0-1. | Referee: S McMahon (Clare) |

== Division 3 ==
National Hurling League Division 3
- Season: 2006
- Champions: Roscommon; Captain: Mervyn Connaughton; Manager: David McConn
- Promoted: Roscommon
- Matches: 25
- Biggest home win: Roscommon 4-20 - 2-4 Cavan (25 March 2007)
- Biggest away win: Fermanagh 1-13 - 4-24 Roscommon (1 April 2007)
- Highest scoring: Donegal 6-15 - 1-9 Leitrim (25 March 2007); Tyrone 1-21 - 2-15 Louth (25 March 2007)
- All statistics correct as of 19 February 2016.

On 29 April 2007, Roscommon won the title after a 1-13 to 0-15 win over Sligo.

=== Structure ===
A total of 10 teams contested the third division of the league, including 9 sides from the 2006 season and one relegated from the 2006 National League Division 2. On 30 April 2006, Armagh earned promotion from the 2006 National League Division 3. They were crowned Division 3 champions after beating Longford. They replaced Roscommon who were relegated to Division 3 at the end of the previous season

The 10 teams in Division 1 were divided into two groups of five teams - 3A and 3B. Each team played all the others in its group once, earning 2 points for a win and 1 for a draw. The first-placed teams in 3A and 3B advanced to the league semi-finals. The second and third-placed teams in 3A and 3B advanced to the league quarter-finals.

The two bottom placed teams in each group contested the Division 3 Shield and advanced to the semi-finals. The winners of these two games contested the Shield final.

=== Division 3A ===
| Pos | Team | Pld | W | D | L | F | A | Pts | Notes |
|---|---|---|---|---|---|---|---|---|---|
| 1 | Sligo | 4 | 3 | 1 | 0 | 5-41 | 4-32 | 7 | Division 3 runners-up |
| 2 | Louth | 4 | 2 | 1 | 1 | 6-51 | 7-42 | 5 | |
| 3 | Donegal | 4 | 2 | 0 | 2 | 12-43 | 3-42 | 4 | |
| 4 | Leitrim | 4 | 1 | 1 | 2 | 6-31 | 11-44 | 3 | |
| 5 | Monaghan | 4 | 0 | 1 | 3 | 2-42 | 6-48 | 1 | |

Group stage

| 18 February 2007 Round 1 | Louth | 3-14 - 2-7 | Leitrim | Drogheda Park, Drogheda |

| 18 February 2007 Round 1 | Monaghan | 0-11 - 0-12 | Sligo | Páirc Gaeltacht Corr Dubh, Corduff |

| 4 March 2007 Round 2 | Donegal | 1-11 - 1-12 | Louth | O'Donnell Park, Letterkenny |

| 4 March 2007 Round 2 | Leitrim | 0-10 - 0-7 | Monaghan | Seán O'Heslin Park, Ballinamore |

| 18 March 2007 Round 3 | Leitrim | 3-5 - 2-8 | Sligo | Seán O'Heslin Park, Ballinamore |

| 18 March 2007 Round 3 | Monaghan | 0-8 - 5-9 | Donegal | O'Neill, Clontibret |

| 25 March 2007 Round 4 | Sligo | 2-9 - 1-7 | Louth | Markievicz Park, Sligo |

| 25 March 2007 Round 4 | Donegal | 6-15 - 1-9 | Leitrim | O'Donnell Park, Letterkenny |

| 1 April 2007 Round 5 | Louth | 1-18 - 2-15 | Monaghan | Páirc na nGael, Dundalk |

| 1 April 2007 Round 5 | Sligo | 1-12 - 0-9 | Donegal | Tourlestrane GAA Grounds |

=== Division 3B ===
| Pos | Team | Pld | W | D | L | F | A | Pts | Notes |
|---|---|---|---|---|---|---|---|---|---|
| 1 | Roscommon | 4 | 4 | 0 | 0 | 11-67 | 6-34 | 8 | Division 3 champions |
| 2 | Longford | 4 | 3 | 0 | 1 | 8-49 | 3-45 | 6 | |
| 3 | Tyrone | 4 | 2 | 0 | 2 | 6-61 | 7-34 | 4 | |
| 4 | Fermanagh | 4 | 0 | 1 | 3 | 5-41 | 10-66 | 1 | |
| 5 | Cavan | 4 | 0 | 1 | 3 | 8-26 | 12-65 | 1 | |

Group stage

| 18 February 2007 Round 1 | Longford | 4-12 - 1-9 | Cavan | Pearse Park, Longford |

| 18 February 2007 Round 1 | Tyrone | 2-18 - 2-7 | Fermanagh | Healy Park, County Tyrone |

| 4 March 2007 Round 2 | Cavan | 1-9 - 2-23 | Tyrone | Kingspan Breffni Park, Cavan |

| 4 March 2007 Round 2 | Roscommon | 1-15 - 2-7 | Longford | Dr. Hyde Park, Roscommon |

| 18 March 2007 Round 3 | Cavan | 4-4 - 2-10 | Fermanagh | Kingspan Breffni Park, Cavan |

| 18 March 2007 Round 3 | Tyrone | 1-10 - 2-8 | Roscommon | Healy Park, Omagh |

| 25 March 2007 Round 4 | Fermanagh | 0-11 - 0-20 | Longford | Cavancarragh |

| 25 March 2007 Round 4 | Roscommon | 4-20 - 2-4 | Cavan | Knockcroghery |

| 1 April 2007 Round 5 | Fermanagh | 1-13 - 4-24 | Roscommon | Lisnaskea |

| 1 April 2007 Round 5 | Longford | 2-10 - 1-10 | Tyrone | Pearse Park, Longford |

=== Knock-out stage ===
Quarter-finals

| 8 April 2007 Quarter-final | Tyrone | 1-21 - 2-15 (aet) | Louth | St. Tiernach's Park, Clones |
| | J Kelly 1-4, C McErlean 0-7, J Kerr 0-2, R Winters 0-2, P McMahon 0-1, J Treacey 0-1, D Lavery 0-1, J O'Neill 0-1, SP Begley 0-1, P Lavery 0-1. | | C Connolly 1-6, S Callan 0-4, N McEneaney 1-0, S Fennell 0-2, E McCarthy 0-1, P Donohoe 0-1, T Hilliard 0-1. | Referee: T Mahon (Fermanagh) |

| 8 April 2007 Quarter-final | Longford | 1-16 - 0-13 | Donegal | Markievicz Park, Sligo |
| | N Casey 0-5, C Finnucane 1-0, G Ghee 0-1, E Corcoran 0-1, R Stakelum 0-1, M Cassidy 0-1, M Heffernan 0-1. | | D Cullen 0-6, K Campbell 0-2, E Organ 0-2, M McCann 0-1, P Hannigan 0-1, C Dowds 0-1. | Referee: J O'Rourke (Monaghan) |

Semi-finals

| 15 April 2007 Semi-final | Roscommon | 1-22 - 1-8 | Tyrone | Breffni Park, Cavan |
| | S Sweeney 0-8, M Cunningham 1-3, A Cunniffe 0-2, T Reddington 0-2, T Lennon 0-2, J Moran 0-2, C Kelly 0-1, B Handley 0-1, G Fallon 0-1. | | C McElerlean 1-2, P Lavery 0-4, P McMahon 0-1, D Lavery 0-1. | Referee: T Carroll (Offaly) |

| 15 April 2007 Semi-final | Sligo | 2-10 - 1-11 | Longford | Breffni Park, Cavan |
| | K Raymond 0-8, M Shelly 1-0, J Mullins 1-0, J Quinn 0-1, M Gilmartin 0-1. | | J O'Brien 1-2, E Donnellan 0-5, G Ghee 0-1, M Coyle 0-1, M Cassidy 0-1, M Cunningham 0-1. | Referee: M Bartley (Meath) |

Final

| 29 April 2007 Final | Roscommon | 1-13 - 0-15 | Sligo | Breffni Park, Cavan |
| | S Sweeney 0-9, Colm Kelly 1-2, M Connaughton 0-1, T Reddington 0-1. | | K Raymond 0-10, D Collery 0-1, P Severs 0-1, D Burke 0-1, M Fitzsimons 0-1, M Gilmartin 0-1. | Referee: P Greene (Galway) |

=== Shield ===
Semi-finals

| 15 April 2007 Semi-final | Leitrim | 4-11 - 2-4 | Cavan | Markievicz Park, Sligo |
| | C Conniffe 0-6, M Burns 1-1, B Carroll 1-1, J McGrail 1-0, B Murra 1-0, S Walsh 0-2, D Poniard 0-1. | | P Sheridan 1-4, R O'Hanlon 1-0. | Referee: D Magee (Down) |

| 15 April 2007 Semi-final | Monaghan | 0-5 - 1-12 | Fermanagh | Markievicz Park, Sligo |
| | J Greene 0-2, D Connelly 0-1, H Cullen 0-1, N Morgan 0-1. | | J McManus 0-5, N Óg Murphy 1-0, R Bogue 0-3, C McManus 0-2, P McManus 0-1, M Slavin 0-1. | Referee: J Devlin (Tyrone) |

Final

| 29 April 2007 Final | Fermanagh | 1-11 – 1-10 | Leitrim | Markievicz Park, Sligo |
| | J McManus 1-3, D McGarry 0-3, P McManus 0-2, R Bogue 0-1, C McManus 0-1, D Curran 0-1. | Report | C Cunniffe 1-8, M Poniard 0-1. M Burns 0-1. | Referee: E O'Shaughnessy (Galway) |
