= Pat Minogue =

Irish hurler

Personal information
- Native name: Pádraig Ó Muineog (Irish)
- Born: 1 May 1972 (age 54) Scariff, County Clare, Ireland

Sport
- Sport: Hurling
- Position: Left wing-forward
Club
- Years: Club
- Scariff
Club titles
- Clare titles: 0
Inter-county
- Years: County
- 1990–1993: Clare
Inter-county titles
- Munster titles: 0
- All-Irelands: 0
- NHL: 0
- All Stars: 0

Patrick Minogue (born 1 May 1972) is an Irish retired hurler. At club level he played with Scariff and at inter-county level with the Clare senior hurling team.

== Career ==
Minogue played hurling and Gaelic football as a student at Scariff Community College. At club level, he played with Scariff. He was part of the club's senior team that lost Clare SHC final in 1991 and 1995.

At inter-county level, Minogue first appeared for Clare as a member of the minor team. He won a Munster MHC medal before losing to Offaly in the 1989 All-Ireland MHC final. He later progressed to the under-21 team and was part of the team defeated by Waterford in the 1992 Munster under-21 HC final.

Minogue made his senior team debut during the 1990-91 National Hurling League.

== Honours ==
Clare

- Munster Minor Hurling Championship: 1989

Sporting positions
Preceded by Paul Lee	Care minor hurling team captain 1990	Succeeded by Tomás Corbett
