= John Minogue =

Irish hurler and manager

Personal information
- Native name: Seán Ó Muineog (Irish)
- Born: 21 December 1959 (age 66) Scariff, County Clare, Ireland
- Occupations: Deputy Principal, St Flannan's
- Height: 5 ft 9 in (175 cm)

Sport
- Sport: Hurling
- Position: Corner-back
Club
- Years: Club
- 1970s-1990s: Scariff
Club titles
- Clare titles: 0
Inter-county
Years	County	Apps (scores)
1983-1990	Clare	5 (0-00)
Inter-county titles
- Munster titles: 0
- All-Irelands: 0
- NHL: 0
- All Stars: 0

John Minogue (born 21 December 1959 in Scariff, County Clare, Ireland) is an Irish hurling manager and former player. He is the current manager of the Clare under-21 hurling team.

Minogue captained UCC to 1 Fitzgibbon Cup in 1981 and also won a medal the next year 1982. He captained the combined universities team in 1981. He played his club hurling with Scariff and at inter-county level with Clare, playing in two County Finals and winning one Clare Cup. He was a corner-back on the latter team at various intervals throughout the 1980s, as well as serving as team captain for a season. He captained Clare to win the Oireachtas Cup in 1983.

In retirement from playing Minogue has become involved in team management at various levels. In his role as a teacher he has guided St. Flannan's College to 6 of Dr. Harty Cup titles and 3 All Ireland Colleges titles. Between 2000 and 2002 Minogue was a selector under Cyril Lyons on the Clare senior hurling team reaching an All Ireland Final. He managed the Clare under-21 hurling team, a team that captured the Munster and All-Ireland titles in 2009.

Sporting positions
Preceded by John Callinan	Clare Senior Hurling Captain; 1983	Succeeded by Ger Loughnane
Achievements
Preceded by Michael Walsh (Kilkenny)	All-Ireland Under-21 Hurling Final winning manager 2009	Succeeded by Ken Hogan (Tipperary)
