= Barry Murphy (Clare hurler) =

Irish hurler

Personal information
- Native name: Barra Ó Murchú (Irish)
- Born: 7 July 1975 (age 51) Scariff, County Clare, Ireland
- Height: 5 ft 10 in (178 cm)

Sport
- Sport: Hurling
- Position: Left corner-forward
Clubs
- Years: Club
- Kilnamona; Scariff
Club titles
- Clare titles: 0
Inter-county
Years	County	Apps (scores)
1997-2004	Clare	15 (1-15)
Inter-county titles
- Munster titles: 6
- All-Irelands: 1
- NHL: 0
- All Stars: 0

Barry Murphy (born 7 July 1975) is an Irish former hurler who played as a left corner-forward for the Clare senior team.

Murphy made his first appearance for the team during the 1997 championship and was a regular member of the starting fifteen until his retirement after the 2004 championship. During that time he won one All-Ireland medal and one Munster medal.

At club level Murphy continues to play with Scariff.
