= Arthur Quinlan =

Irish raconteur and print journalist with The Irish Times

- Ardúr Ó Cúinnlóin
- Born: 15 January 1921
- Died: 22 December 2012 (aged 91)
- Other names: Mr. Limerick; Uncle Arthur
- Education: B. A. English literature and history
- Alma mater: University College Dublin (UCD)
- Occupation: Journalist
- Years active: 1945–2000
- Employer: The Irish Times
- Spouse: Vera Quinlan
- Children: 3

Arthur Quinlan (15 January 1921 – 22 December 2012) was an Irish raconteur and print journalist with The Irish Times. Known for his interviews with politicians, royalty and film stars in a career spanning more than 50 years, he was widely regarded as a very important figure in his field, and was both the first Irishman to get a jet across the Atlantic Ocean to New York in 1958 and the only western journalist to have interviewed Che Guevara. Considered a "master of executing international scoops", his work was sent across the world.

== Early life ==
Quinlan came from Dublin but was raised in Quin, County Clare. He attended University College Dublin (UCD), where he studied English literature and history and edited two student publications.

== Journalism ==
Quinlan began working with The Irish Times in 1945. He was formerly based at Shannon Airport. Shannon is the most westerly airport in Europe and an important fuel stop for both eastward and westward traffic. Quinlan would start up his 1939 Morris 8 and head for the airport, using it as an opportunity to interview those passing through. He interviewed every United States President from Harry Truman to George H. W. Bush and many Soviet leaders, including Andrey Vyshinsky and Andrei Gromyko.

He once said,

"I interviewed many royals including the Duke of Edinburgh, Princess Margaret, King Michael of Romania and his mother (sic), Queen Maria, King Peter of Yugoslavia, King Zog of Albania, King Ibn Saud, founder of Saudi Arabia, Emperor Haile Selassie of Ethiopia, Queen Wilhelmina and Queen Juliana of Holland and that lovely couple Prince Rainier and his wife, the former Grace Kelly."

When Captain Charles Lindbergh's son was kidnapped, Quinlan interviewed him. A 4 am interview with George H. W. Bush on the Middle East left U.S. journalists perplexed as to why an Irish 'stringer' had managed to get hold of such a story.

Quinlan taught Fidel Castro how to make an Irish coffee and was the only western journalist to have interviewed Che Guevara. Guevara talked of his Irish connections through the name Lynch. He told Quinlan of his grandmother's Irish roots in Galway. Later, Che, and some of his Cuban comrades, went to Limerick and adjourned to Hanratty's Hotel on Glentworth Street. According to Quinlan, they returned that evening all wearing sprigs of shamrock, for Shannon and Limerick were preparing for the St. Patrick's Day celebrations.

In his 80s, he retired, declaring he had 'handed in his gun to The Irish Times'.

== Awards and honours ==
Quinlan was a "member of honour" of the National Union of Journalists. He was recognised in media circles as "Mr. Limerick" and "Uncle Arthur". In 1982, he successfully proposed that women be allowed to join Shannon Rowing Club, from which they had been banned. The club's main slipway is also named "Arthur" in his honour.

== Death ==
Quinlan died in Limerick in December 2012. A son and two daughters survived him. His wife, Vera, died shortly before him. Among those regarding him with fondness were Fergal Keane of the BBC.
