= List of Laois senior hurling team captains =

This article lists players who have recently captained the Laois county hurling team in the Leinster Senior Hurling Championship and the All-Ireland Senior Hurling Championship.

== List of captains ==
Year	Player	Club	National titles	Provincial titles
2006	Patrick Mullaney	Castletown		
2007	Joe FitzPatrick	Rathdowney-Errill		
2008	Niall Holmes	Camross		
2009	Brian Campion	Rathdowney-Errill		
2010	Brian Campion	Rathdowney-Errill		
2011	Brian Campion	Rathdowney-Errill		
2012	Willie Hyland	Clough-Ballacolla		
2013	Matthew Whelan	Borris-in-Ossory		
2014	Matthew Whelan	Borris-in-Ossory		
2015	Joe FitzPatrick	Rathdowney-Errill		
2016	Charles Dwyer	Ballinakill		
2017	Ross King	Rathdowney-Errill		
2018				
2019	Paddy Purcell	Rathdowney-Errill		
