= Joe Fitzpatrick (hurler) =

Irish hurler

Personal information
- Native name: Seosamh Mac Giolla Pádraig (Irish)
- Born: 29 April 1984 (age 42) Portlaoise, Ireland
- Height: 1.83 m (6 ft 0 in)

Sport
- Sport: Hurling
- Position: Right half back
Club
- Years: Club
- Rathdowney–Errill
Club titles
- Laois titles: 4
Inter-county*
Years	County	Apps (scores)
2003-	Laois	28 (1-18)
Inter-county titles
- NHL: 1
- *Inter County team apps and scores correct as of 7 April 2014.

Joe Fitzpatrick (born 29 April 1984) is an Irish hurler who plays as a right wing-back for the Laois senior team.

Born in Rathdowney, County Laois, Fitzpatrick first played competitive hurling in his youth. He made his senior debut for Laois during the 2003 National Hurling League. He has gone on to play a key role for Laois for over a decade, and has won one National League (Division 2) medal.

At club level he Fitzpatrick is a five-time championship medallist with Rathdowney–Errill.

Joe is also a Hurley Maker-based just outside Rathdowney.

== Honours ==
Rathdowney-Errill

- Laois Senior Hurling Championship (5): 2006, 2008, 2010, 2012, 2014

Laois

- National Hurling League (Division 2) (1): 2007 (c)
- National Hurling League, Division 2A (1): 2013

Sporting positions
Preceded by Patrick Mullaney	Laois Senior Hurling Captain; 2007	Succeeded by Niall Holmes
