= Plassey, County Clare =

Country estate in County Clare, Ireland

In 1761, Major-General Robert Clive (1725-1774) gave orders for his estate in County Clare, centred on the townland of Ballykilty near the village of Quin, to be renamed Plassey: 'the name of the place (now Palashi) where we gained our great victory in India to which I owe all my good fortune'. The victory was the Battle of Plassey in June 1757. In 1762, he was ennobled as The 1st Baron Clive, of Plassey in the County of Clare, in the Peerage of Ireland. In 1764, Lord Clive was appointed a Knight Companion of the Order of the Bath (K.B.). Clive had bought this country estate in County Clare around 1760 from a Dublin banker called Henry Mitchell.

A number of authors have assumed a direct link between Major-General Lord Clive and Plassey House, now the administrative centre of the University of Limerick (U.L.). Plassey House is located on the opposite, County Limerick bank of the River Shannon, at Monaleen in Castletroy, on the outskirts of Limerick City. This university campus is connected by a bridge to County Clare. More recently, John Logan of the University of Limerick (U.L.) has asserted that there is 'no historical basis for ascribing either occupancy or ownership of Plassey House or its adjacent lands to Robert Clive.' It has been suggested that Plassey House was renamed in the late eighteenth century by Thomas Maunsell, who lived there, to commemorate his own rôle or that of a family member in the Battle of Plassey.

Robert, 1st Baron Clive, was succeeded in his peerage and estates by his son Edward, 2nd Baron Clive (1754-1839). The 2nd Lord Clive was created 1st Earl of Powis in the Peerage of the United Kingdom in 1804. The Plassey Estate in County Clare was later sold by The 2nd Earl of Powis (1785-1848), grandson of The 1st Lord Clive, in 1842.
