= Amby Power =

Irish hurler (1884–1960)

Ambrose Power
Personal information
- Native name: Ambrós de Paor (Irish)
- Nickname: Amby
- Born: 17 February 1884 Quin, County Clare, Ireland
- Died: 25 February 1960 (aged 76) Quin, County Clare, Ireland
- Occupations: Publican, farmer, politician
- Height: 6 ft 2 in (188 cm)

Sport
- Sport: Hurling
- Position: Centre-back
Clubs
- Years: Club
- Tulla; Carrahan
Club titles
- Clare titles: 2
Inter-county
- Years: County
- Clare
Inter-county titles
- Munster titles: 1
- All-Irelands: 1

Ambrose Power (17 February 1884 – 25 February 1960) was an Irish hurler. At club level he played with Tulla and Carrahan, and also lined out at inter-county level with the Clare senior hurling team. Power also spent a period as trainer of the Clare team.

== Career ==
Power first played hurling in his local area with the Tulla club. He was part of the Clare SHC-winning team in 1905, while he also claimed back-to-back Redmond Cups with Tulla in 1905 and 1906, on a team that also featured his brothers. The introduction of the parish rule meant the Power had to play with the then Carrahan club after 1906. He earned a call-up to the Clare senior hurling team around this time and was part of the team that beat Galway to claim the Croke Cup in 1908.

The abolition of the parish rule in 1911 resulted in Power and his brothers returning to play with Tulla. He claimed a second Clare SHC medal in 1913, a win which resulted in him taking over the captaincy of the Clare team. Power won a Munster SHC medal in 1914, before later captaining Clare to a defeat of Laois in the 1914 All-Ireland final.

In retirement from playing, Power became involved in coaching. He was trainer of the Clare team that won the Munster SHC title in 1932, before losing the subsequent All-Ireland final to Kilkenny.

== Personal life and death ==
Power came from a large family of 11 siblings which included 4 sisters and 7 brothers, 3 of which, Fred, Joe, and Harry also played for Clare. His parents were Michael and Margaret Power. He married Kitty Reddan from Killorglin, County Kerry in November 1923. She inherited a public house in Quin which was run by the family for many years. Power was elected to Clare County Council as a Fine Gael member in 1950 before being re-elected in 1955.

Power died on 25 February 1960, at the age of 76.

== Honours ==
=== Player ===
Tulla

- Clare Senior Hurling Championship: 1905, 1913
- Redmond Cup: 1905, 1906

Clare

- All-Ireland Senior Hurling Championship: 1914
- Munster Senior Hurling Championship: 1914
- Croke Cup: 1908

=== Management ===
Clare

- Munster Senior Hurling Championship: 1932

Sporting positions
Preceded by	Clare senior hurling team captain 1914-1916	Succeeded by
Achievements
Preceded by Dick Walsh	All-Ireland Senior Hurling Final winning captain 1914	Succeeded by Jack Finlay
