= Joseph Power (librarian) =

English librarian

Joseph Power (5 October 1798 – 1868) was the librarian of the University of Cambridge from 1845 to 1864.
