= Quin, County Clare =

Village in County Clare, Ireland

Quin Irish: Cuinche
- Village and parish
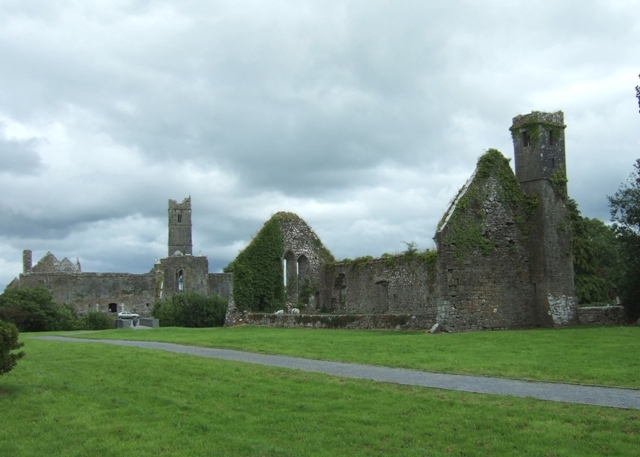
- The ruins of the former parish church, with Quin Abbey beyond

- Location in Ireland
- Coordinates: 52°49′06″N 8°51′55″W
- Country: Ireland
- Province: Munster
- County: County Clare
- Local electoral area: Ennis East
- Dáil constituency: Clare

Population (2022)
  - Total: 922
- Time zone: UTC+0 (WET)
  - Summer (DST): UTC-1 (IST (WEST))
- Irish Grid Reference: R417742

Quin (Irish: Cuinche, meaning 'arbutus grove or quince') is a village in southeast County Clare, Ireland. The name also refers to a civil parish in the barony of Bunratty Upper, and to an ecclesiastical parish of the same name. The main attraction in the vicinity is Quin Abbey, the ruins of Franciscan friary, which is open to the public. Although roofless, much of the structure remains and is relatively well-preserved. The abbey was built on the foundations of an earlier Norman castle; the foundations of three corner towers can still be seen.

The village is located in the townland sometimes known as Plassey.

== Name ==
The placename (Irish Cuinche; 13th-century documents also use the spellings Cuinnche, Cuinnchi, Cunnchi, Cuindchi, Coinche, Coynche, Cuínchi, Cuince) is thought to derive from a tree: either an arbutus (strawberry tree) (Irish caithne) or perhaps a quince (Irish cainche), used at the time for making jam.

== Location ==
The village of Quin is 9 kilometres (6 mi) from Ennis. The River Rine runs through the village, and Knappogue Castle is 3.3 km (2.1 mi) to the southeast. There was a productive lead mine at Ballyhickey, from which ore was taken to Clarecastle for shipment to Wales.

The Catholic parish of Quin is in the Roman Catholic Diocese of Killaloe. The churches in the parish are Blessed John XXIII in Clooney, St. Mary's in Quin, and St. Stephen's in Maghera.

The civil parish of Quin is in the Bunratty Upper barony. The civil parish held 7,290 statute acres in 1837, as applotted under the Tithe Act. The townlands in the Quin civil parish are:

- Applefort
- Ballagh
- Ballyhannan North
- Ballyhannan South
- Ballyhickey
- Ballykilty (also known as Plassey)
- Ballymacloon East
- Ballymacloon North
- Ballymacloon West
- Ballymarkahan
- Ballyroughan North
- Ballyroughan South
- Cahercalla
- Cant
- Carnmallow
- Carrowgar
- Carrowmeer
- Carrowroe
- Cloonaherna
- Coogaun
- Coolshamroge
- Commons
- Cragbwee
- Craggataska
- Craggaunowen
- Creevagh Beg
- Creevagh More
- Cullenagh
- Cullaun
- Cutteen
- Dangan
- Danganbrack
- Deerpark North
- Deerpark South
- Feaghquin
- Gorteen
- Keevagh
- Kildrum
- Kilnacrandy
- Knocknagoug
- Knappogue
- Madara
- Quin
- Quingardens
- Quinville North
- Quinville South
- Rathluby
- Rine
- Rinneen
- Shandangan

== History ==
Some of the most important prehistoric gold works in Ireland were found in Quin.

An earlier abbey was founded in Quin around 1250 but burned down in 1278. In 1280, Thomas de Clare built a Norman castle on the same site, which later fell into ruin. During the time of this castle, Quin is first mentioned as a village.

The castle ruins were later rebuilt as a church (c. 1350) and Quin Abbey (1433). Quin Abbey is considered to be one of the finest and most complete remains of monastic antiquity in Ireland. The abbey housed many Franciscan friars until the death of the last monk, Father Hogan, in 1820. His burial site can be visited in the abbey.

News of the Irish Rebellion of 1641 was first announced in County Clare "at the great fair of Quin".

In 1837, the parish had a small plain church of the Church of Ireland, built in 1797. At the time, a new Catholic chapel in Gothic style was being built.

== Demographics ==
As of 1831, there were 2,918 inhabitants, of whom 173 lived in the village. According to a 2002 Census, Quin had a population of 853. By 2006, the population had grown to around 1,048. In the 2022 census, the village population was 922.

== Sport ==
Clooney Quin GAA was founded in 1888. Players for the Clooney/Quin club include Amby Power, who captained the Clare 1914 All-Ireland winning team.

== Transport ==
Quin is approximately 21 kilometres from Shannon Airport.

Quin is served by Bus Éireann bus 317 and Local Link bus 318, both routes operate to and from Ennis and Limerick.

== Notable people ==
- Ger Colleran, former editor of the Irish Daily Star, grew up in Quin
- Paddy Hannan born in 1840, started the then world's biggest gold rush in 1893 in Kalgoorlie
- Amby Power (hurler) born in 1887 in Quin
- Arthur Quinlan (journalist) was reared in Quin

== See also ==
- List of towns and villages in Ireland
