= Quin Abbey =

Ruined Franciscan abbey in Clare, Ireland

- Mainistir Chuinche
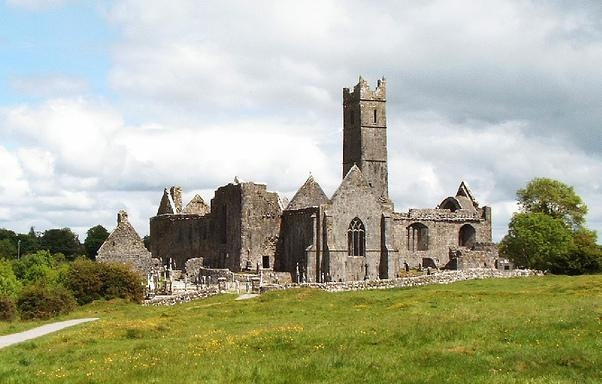
- Quin Abbey

- Location within Ireland
- Interactive map of Quin Abbey

Monastery information
- Other name: Quin Friary
- Order: Franciscans
- Established: c. 1350 (church), 1433 (abbey)
- Disestablished: 1541

People
- Founder: MacNamara family

Architecture
- Heritage designation: National Monument
- Style: Gothic
- Groundbreaking: 1402
- Completion date: 1433

Site
- Location: Quin, County Clare, Ireland
- Coordinates: 52°49′9.43″N 8°51′46.87″W
- Public access: Yes

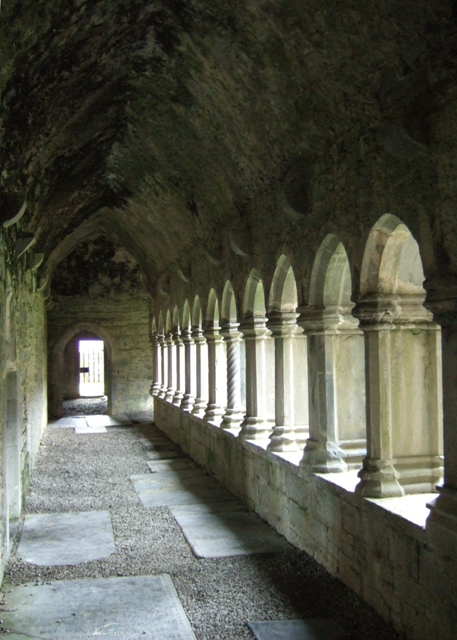
The ambulatory surrounding the cloister at Quin Abbey

Quin Abbey (Irish: Mainistir Chuinche), is a ruined Franciscan abbey in Quin, County Clare, Ireland. It was built for Fathers Purcell and Mooney, friars of the Franciscan order.

== History ==
The placename (Irish Cuinche; 13th-century documents also use the spellings Cuinnche, Cuinnchi, Cunnchi, Cuindchi, Coinche, Coynche, Cuínchi, Cuince) is thought to derive from a tree: either an arbutus (strawberry tree) (Irish caithne) or perhaps a quince (Irish cainche), used at the time for making jam.

A far earlier monastery had existed on the site but burned down in 1278. A Norman castle was built soon after by Thomas de Clare, a military commander. The foundations of the castle's enormous corner towers can still be seen. Around 1350 the castle, by then a ruin, was rebuilt as a church by the MacNamara clan.

The present abbey was rebuilt either by Mac Cam Dall Macnamara or by Sioda Cam MacConmara between 1402 and 1433, using the south curtain-wall of the old castle. It was this structure which the MacNamaras subsequently rebuilt as the present abbey, properly called a friary. In 1541, during the Reformation, King Henry VIII confiscated the friary and it passed into the hands of Conor O'Brian, Earl of Thomond. In about 1590 the MacNamaras regained control of the site and once again set about repairing and restoring it. The monastery was repaired by 1604.

In about 1640 the building became a college and is alleged to have had 800 students. Oliver Cromwell arrived only 10 years later, killing the friars and destroying the friary. In 1671 the building was once again restored, but never regained its former status.

In 1740 Bishop Pococke described it thus: "Quin is one of the finest and most entire monasteries that I have seen in Ireland." As late as 1808 the monastery was reported to be in much the same condition as Pococke had found it.

In 1760 the friars were ultimately expelled, although the last Friar, John Hogan, remained there until his death in 1820, by which time the buildings were ruined by neglect.

== Architecture ==
Although mostly roofless, the structure of the abbey is relatively well preserved. There is an intact cloister, and many other surviving architectural features make the friary of significant historical value.

A visitor centre is located near the building and the structure and grounds can be visited free of charge. A caretaker is permanently based at the monument. Floodlighting has also been installed. The graveyard surrounding the friary is still in use.

== See also ==
- List of abbeys and priories in Ireland (County Clare)
