= Philip Brennan (Clare hurler) =

Irish sportsperson

Personal information
- Native name: Pilib Ó Braonáin (Irish)
- Born: 30 July 1983 (age 43) Tulla, County Clare

Sport
- Sport: Hurling
- Position: Goalkeeper
Club
- Years: Club
- Tulla
Club titles
- Clare titles: 1
Inter-county
Years	County	Apps (scores)
2007-	Clare	9 (0-0)
Inter-county titles
- Munster titles: 0
- All-Irelands: 0

Philip Brennan (born 30 July 1983 in Tulla, County Clare) is an Irish sportsperson. He plays hurling with his local club Tulla and was the goalkeeper on the Clare senior inter-county team from 2007. He works as a hurley maker for John Torpey Woodturning Ltd.
