= Barry Nugent =

Irish hurler

Personal information
- Native name: Barra Dé Nuinseann (Irish)
- Born: Ennis, Ireland
- Occupation: Garda
- Height: 1.9 m (6 ft 3 in)

Sport
- Sport: Hurling
- Position: Full Forward
Club
- Years: Club
- 2008-: Éire Óg
College
- Years: College
- LIT
College titles
- Fitzgibbon titles: 1
Inter-county
- Years: County
- 2003-2008: Clare
Inter-county titles
- Munster titles: 0
- All-Irelands: 0
- NHL: 0
- All Stars: 0

Barry Nugent is an Irish sportsperson. He plays hurling with his local club Éire Óg and has been a member of the Clare senior hurling panel since 2003.

== Playing career ==
=== Club ===
Nugent plays his club hurling and football with Ennis based club Éire Óg.
