= Andrew Quinn (hurler) =

Irish hurler

Personal information
- Native name: Aindrias Ó Cuinn (Irish)
- Born: 25 May 1983 (age 43) Tulla, County Clare, Ireland
- Height: 5 ft 9 in (175 cm)

Sport
- Sport: Hurling
- Position: Right corner-forward
Club
- Years: Club
- Tulla
Club titles
- Clare titles: 1
Inter-county
- Years: County
- 2003-2010: Clare
Inter-county titles
- Munster titles: 0
- All-Irelands: 0
- NHL: 0
- All Stars: 0

Andrew Quinn (born 25 May 1983) is an Irish hurler who played as a right corner-forward for the Clare senior hurling team.

Andrew Quinn's underage career with St Flannan's College included winning Munster under-15 hurling and football, Munster under-16 hurling and football, Dean Ryan Cup and Frewen Cups, and won two Dr Harty Cups and one All-Ireland in 2000 and denied a third Harty Cup in 2001.

At club he won Minor A championship in 2000. He is also a county club championship medalist with Tulla. He contributed high scores on the path to final scoring 1-43 and contested Munster Club and Clare Cup finals after. At the college level he collected a Fitzgibbon Medal with Ul.

In 2007 when Tulla reached the final of the county championship for the first time in almost seventy-five years. Crusheen, a team which had never won the title, provided the opposition. Quinn's brother Brian scored a crucial goal as Tulla secured a 1–7 to 0–9 victory. His brother Mark played at centre back and another brother Karl was a substitute. The victory gave Quinn a Clare Senior Hurling Championship medal. It was the first county title for Tulla since 1933, when the team was captained by his grandfather Paddy.

== Inter-county ==
Quinn first came to prominence on the inter-county scene at under-age levels with Clare playing at all levels. He played minor and under-21 for three years.

He made his senior debut for Clare in a National Hurling League game against Meath in 2002 and later became a regular impact substitute during the subsequent championship campaign. In spite of losing their opening game, Clare surprised the hurling world by qualifying for the All-Ireland final. Quinn came on as a substitute once again as his side put up a good fight against Kilkenny. A combined tally of 2-13 for Henry Shefflin and D. J. Carey gave "the Cats" a seven-point victory. In 2003 he started at full forward in Clare's Munster championship win over Tipperary scoring 1–2.
