= Tulla GAA =

Gaelic games club in County Clare, Ireland

Tulla
- An Tulach
- Founded: 1885
- County: Clare
- Nickname: The Windswept Hill
- Colours: Claret and gold
- Grounds: Páirc an Dálaigh, Cloghaun, Tulla
- Coordinates: 52.861478°N 8.744128°W

Playing kits
Standard colours

Senior Club Championships
	All Ireland	Munster champions	Clare champions
Hurling:	-	1	11

Tulla GAA is a Gaelic Athletic Association club based in Tulla, County Clare, Ireland. It is affiliated with the Clare county board.

== History ==
The club was founded in 1885, making it the oldest club in County Clare. The club's grounds are named Páirc an Dálaigh, after Dr. Tommy Daly.

== Achievements ==
- Munster Senior Club Hurling Championship Runners-Up: 2007
- Clare Senior Hurling Championship (11): 1889, 1896, 1897, 1898 (as Carrahan), 1899, 1900 (as Carrahan), 1905, 1913, 1933, 1975 (as Brian Boru's with Bodyke & Killanena), 2007
- Clare Premier Intermediate Hurling Championship (1): 1979
- Clare Junior A Hurling Championship Runners Up: 2000
- Clare Minor A Hurling Championship (1): 2000

== Notable players ==
- Philip Brennan
- Jack Coughlan
- Dr. Tommy Daly
- Jim Houlihan
- Amby Power
- Joe Power
- Andrew Quinn
- Brian Quinn
- David McInerney
- John Fahy, Milltown
