= Scariff GAA =

Gaelic games club in County Clare, Ireland

Scariff
- An Scairbh
- Founded: 1890
- County: Clare
- Colours: Green and White
- Coordinates: 52°54′45.62″N 8°31′58.22″W

Playing kits
Standard colours

Senior Club Championships
| | All Ireland | Munster champions | Clare champions |
|---|---|---|---|
| Hurling: | - | - | 5 |

Scariff is a Gaelic Athletic Association club in Scariff, County Clare, Ireland.

== History ==
There is very little recorded of the first few years of Scariff Hurling Club, but it has almost certainly always been a senior club. In 1907, Scariff played in its first Clare Senior Hurling Championship county final, beating O'Callaghan Mills. It won further senior championships in 1917, 1946, 1952 and 1953 and lost the final in 1918, 1919, 1942, 1943, 1960, 1991 and 1995.

== Major honours ==
- Clare Senior Hurling Championship (5): 1907, 1917, 1946, 1952, 1953
- Clare Intermediate Hurling Championship (3): 1938, 1982, 2020
- Clare Junior A Hurling Championship (3): 1936, 1971, 1992
- Clare Junior A Football Championship (3): 1952, 1960, 1993
- Clare Under-21 A Hurling Championship (3): 1987, 2022, 2024 (with Ogonelloe)

== Notable managers ==
- Mike McNamara
- John Minogue
- Donal Moloney

== Notable players ==
Players to play Senior Championship Hurling with Clare

- Dan McInerney

Des Carroll JJ Bugler Eamon Long Vinny Henchy

- John Minogue
- Éamonn Giblin
- Donal Moloney

Pat Minogue

- Barry Murphy
- Brendan "Mousey" McNamara
- Mark Rodgers

Patrick Crotty

== See also ==
- Scarriff
- Clare GAA
