= Doora =

Doora may refer to:

== Localities ==
- Doora, Agra, a village in the Kiraoli Tehsil of Agra district, Uttar Pradesh, India
- Doora, County Clare, a civil parish in County Clare, Ireland, just to the east of the town of Ennis
- Doora, Mysore, a village in the Mysore Taluka of Mysore district, Karnataka, India
- Doora-Barefield, a parish in the Roman Catholic Diocese of Killaloe, in County Clare, Ireland

== Other ==
- Doora Church, a ruined church in the civil parish of Doora, County Clare, Ireland
- Doora Mine, an abandoned copper mine in the Copper Coast region of South Australia
- Durra, a common name for Sorghum bicolor, a grass species cultivated for its grain
