= Saint Brecan =

Irish saint of 5th–6th century

- Born: Breasel son of Eochaidh Bailldearg; 5th century AD
- Died: 6th century AD
- Occupation: Missionary

Saint Brecan was an Irish saint active in the 5th century AD. There are legends concerning Brecan from Clare and Aran, and wells and churches are dedicated to him in various places in Ireland. His main monument is the Tempull Breccain complex on Inishmore in the Aran Islands.

== Life and legends ==
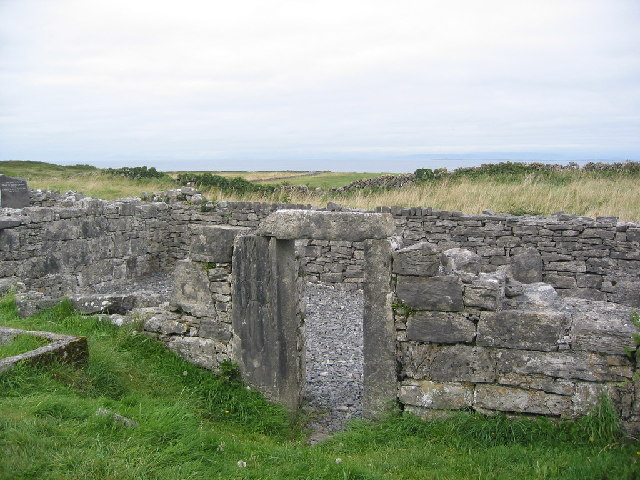
One of the outbuildings of a monastic settlement on Inishmore, Aran Islands, built between the 9th and the 15th centuries. The main church is dedicated to the founding saint, Brecan

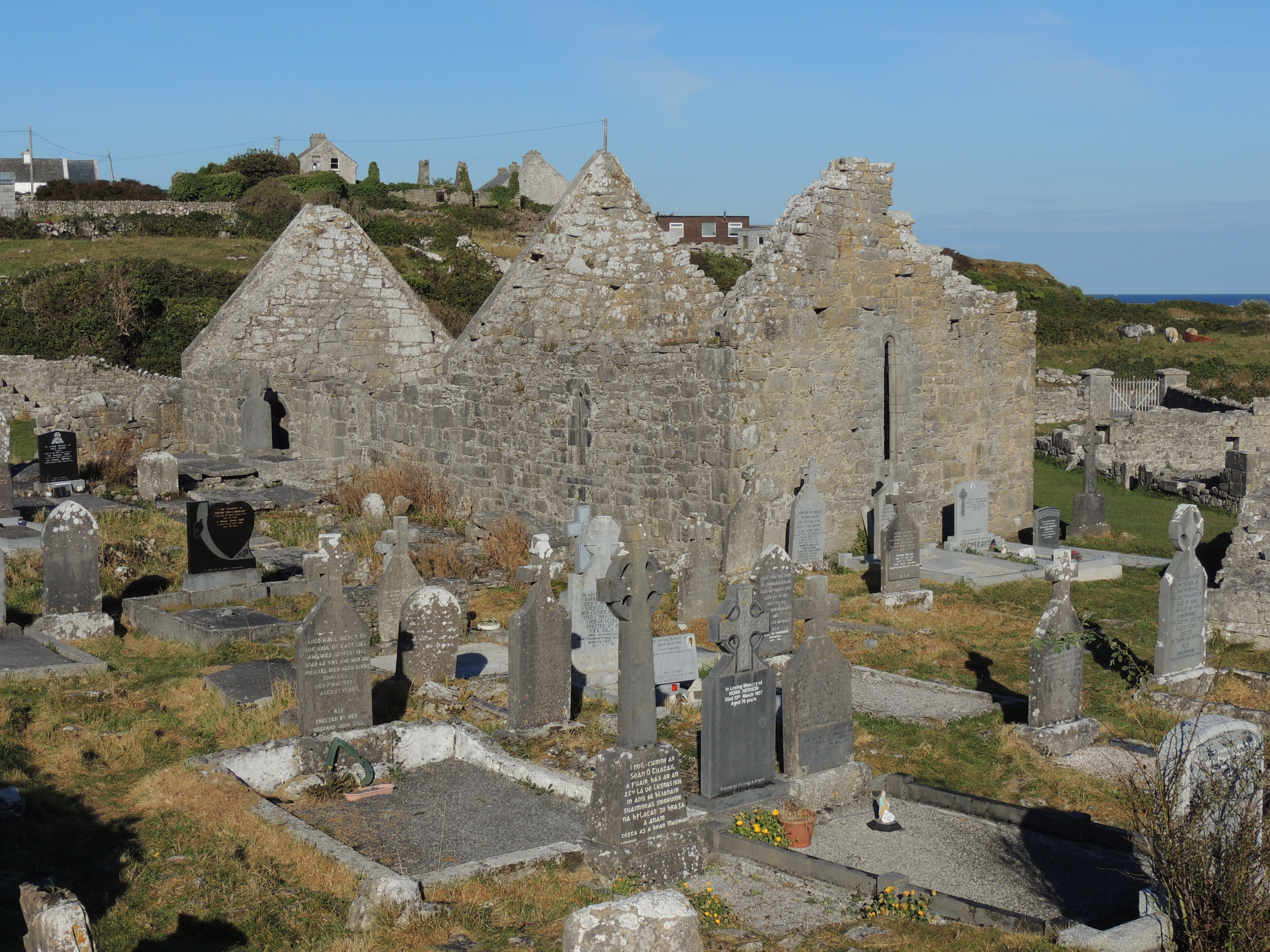
Tempull Breccain on Inishmore

Brecan (Note: Not to be confused with Brecan, the Irish chieftain who became a prominent ruler in Wales around 420 AD and founded one of the "three holy families of Wales".) is the oldest of all the local saints of County Clare, and lived around 480 AD. He was grandchild of Carthan Fionn, one of the Dalcassian kings who reigned in Munster around 439 AD. His grandfather was baptized by Saint Patrick at what is now Singland, near Limerick. His father, son of the king, was Eochu Balldearg, or Eochu of the Red Spot. It was recorded that Eochu was hopelessly disfigured and diseased when he was born, but was cured through a miracle by Saint Patrick. Brecan was one of two sons of Eochaidh Bailldearg, the other being Conall Caemh, and was originally named Breasel. A poem from the 14th or 15th century says he was a soldier before becoming a missionary. On his first mission to Aran he destroyed a reigning idol named Brecán, and took that name for himself. He converted the idol's sanctuary into a hermitage.

According to the antiquarian Thomas Johnson Westropp,

The Clare stories, though vague, represent him consistently as a bright, joyful, affectionate man, hardly troubled by the more mundane temptations. He won crowds of converts by a tact, patience, and sweetness, and is said even to have tried to convert the devils who led forlorn hopes against his temper and patience. He won over the impatient, jealous St. Enda by becoming one of his disciples and causing his own more numerous converts to pay reverence to that saint. He converted a chief (‘King’) whom Enda threatened with lightning, by thanking God for sparing the pagan, and then teaching the convert to do the same. ... In Aran the most definite tale is that Brecan and Enda agreed to set out from their churches at opposite ends of the island and to fix the boundary of their districts at the point at which they met. Brecan celebrated a mass early and set out, with the untiring energy ascribed to him in the Clare tales; but Enda prayed, and the feet of Brecan’s horse stuck fast in the rock near Kilmurvey, in the valley across the island below the great fort Dun Aengusa, until Enda came.

A different version of the dispute between Saints Enda and Brecan is recorded by Roderic O'Flaherty:

A dispute arose among their disciples, who were numerous, regarding the boundary line of the two divisions. The Saints agreed to settle the matter amicably. At day-break next day the two bodies were to start from their respective monasteries and travel leisurely towards each other until they met. The place of meeting was to be the boundary. When the day dawned, the disciples of St. Brecan saw to their astonishment that the followers of St. Enda, who had commenced to travel before daylight, were already far advanced on their journey. They went to their master and complained of this breach of faith. The latter had recourse to prayer, when lo! the advancing party were rooted to the rocks, and remained in that position until St. Brecan arrived to release them.

Saint Brecan died early in the 6th century.

== Legacy ==
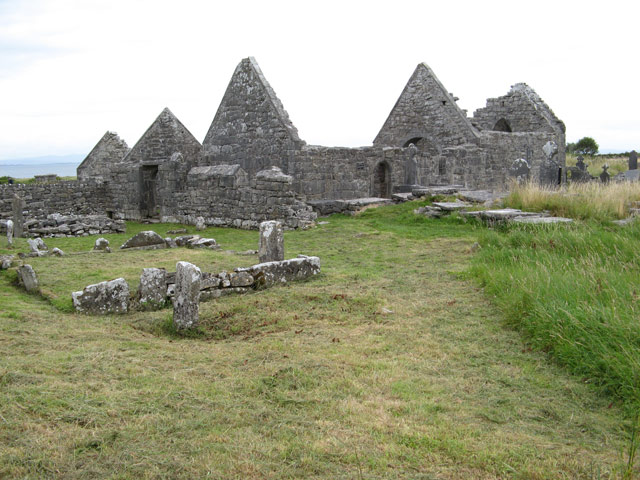
Na Seacht Teampaill (The Seven Churches), Inis Mór

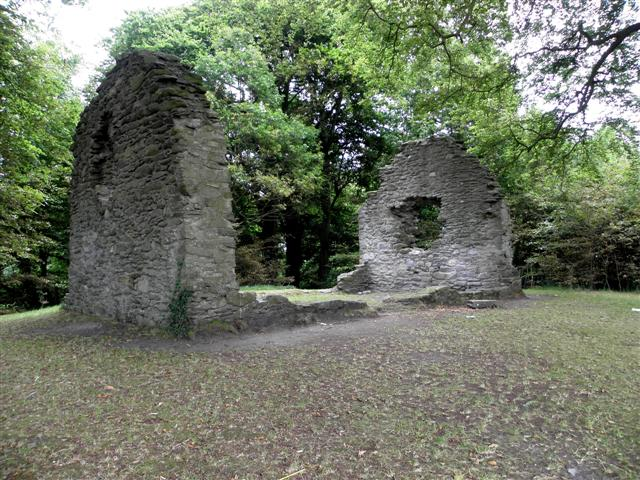
St Brecan's Church ruins, St Columb's Park, Derry

Saint Brecan's most important foundations were the Seven Churches of Aran on Inishmore, of which only the ruins of two have survived. Brecan's church is the chief of the Seven Churches. (Note: The popular name of the "Seven Churches" is due to identification of various other stone structure on the site as churches. They are simple rectangular buildings from the late medieval period that may have been used to lodge pilgrims to the site.) The Tempull Breccain (Church of Brecan) on Aran was described in 1684 as a handsome and formerly parochial church in which Brecan's feast was celebrated on 22 May each year. The Damhliag or great Church of Saint Brecan consists of a nave and a choir connected by a beautiful semi-circular arch of cut stone. The original layout was a rectangle with projections of the north and south walls beyond the east and west gables. It probably had an entrance doorway in the south wall, which suggests it was built in the 12th century or later. The building was remodeled in the 13th century when the chancel and arch were added. The interior of the building is 56 by 18.33 feet (17.07 by 5.59 m). A second church, the Teampull an Phoill (Church of the Hollows) is 125 feet (38 m) from the main church, and probably dates from the 13th century or later.

Brecan's tomb is beside the main church. The Leaba Brecain is an early enclosure that holds a broken but richly carved cross, and contains a slab inscribed with a cross and "[S]ci Brecani". This shows that he was revered as a saint from an early date. A smaller circular stone found in the tomb, about three inches in diameter, was inscribed with the short prayer in Irish: "OR AR BRAN NAILITHER", which may be short for "OROIT AR BRECAN NAILITHER", meaning "A prayer for Brecan the Pilgrim". However, the stone may well have been placed by a pilgrim named Bran.

Brecan is said to have founded many other churches and monasteries. These include Ardbraccan in County Meath, Kilbreccan in the parish of Kilcummin, County Galway, Kilbreccan of Thomand (Note: In 1189 Doora church near Kilbrecan was called Durinierekin.) in the parish of Doora, County Clare, Kilbreccan in Kilkenny, and two churches named Kilbreccan in Carlow. Doora Church near Kilbrecan, Doora parish would have been one of the first central mission churches in Clare if the tradition that it was founded by Brecan is accurate. He also founded what is now called Carntemple about 2 miles (3.2 km) to the east of Doora Church. The modern St. Brecan's Church, Doora, on Noughaval Drive in Noughaval townland, also bears his name. Brecan's name is remembered as "Rikin" at Clooney near Quin, and as "Brecan" at Kilbreckan in Doora parish and at the Toomullin well near the Moher cliffs. A well at Doolin, near Toomullin, was known as St. Brecan's in 1839.

St. Columb's Park in Derry has the ruins of a small church of Saint Brecan's. The original church was destroyed in 1197 by a Rotsel Pitun, a Norman knight. It is mentioned in a text from 1397. The ruins are those of a successor church built in 1585 in the same location by Redmond O'Gallagher, Bishop of Derry. The old church of Saint Brecan is one of the old standing Christian foundations in the city. According to Monsignor Eamon Martin, administrator of the Derry diocese, it is more than 1,500 years old.

== Sources ==
- Ganly, William (1886). ""The Seven Romans" of Arran". The Irish Ecclesiastical Record. Browne and Nolan.
- Harbison, Peter (1 April 1995). Pilgrimage in Ireland: The Monuments and the People. Syracuse University Press. ISBN 978-0-8156-0312-2.
- Map, Doora Barefield Parish
- Martin, Eamon (21 March 2013), "Saint Columba statue unveiled in Londonderry park", BBC News
- Moran, Patrick Francis (1879). Irish Saints in Great Britain. M.H. Gill. p. 7.
- O'Flaherty, Roderic (1846). A Chorographical Description of West Or H-Iar Connaught: Written A.D. 1684. For the Irish Archaeological Society. p. 75.
- "Ruins at St Columb's Park", Early Christian Heritage in the Derry City Council Area (PDF), Derry City Council, archived from the original (PDF) on 1 April 2014
- "St Columb's Park (Heritage Trail)", Discover Northern Ireland
- Wakeman, W.F. (1862). "Aran--Pagan and Christian". Duffy's Hibernian magazine.
- Westropp, Thomas Johnson (1894). "Churches with Round Towers in Northern Clare". Journal of the Royal Society of Antiquaries of Ireland. IV.
- Westropp, Thomas Johnson (1901). "Augustinian Houses of the County Clare, etc". Journal of the Royal Society of Antiquaries of Ireland. Archived from the original on 3 March 2016.
- Westropp, Thomas Johnson (1913). "Early Christian Period". County Clare Folk-Tales and Myths.
