= Spancill Hill, County Clare =

Hill and settlement in County Clare, Ireland

Spancill Hill Cnoc Uarchoille
- Settlement
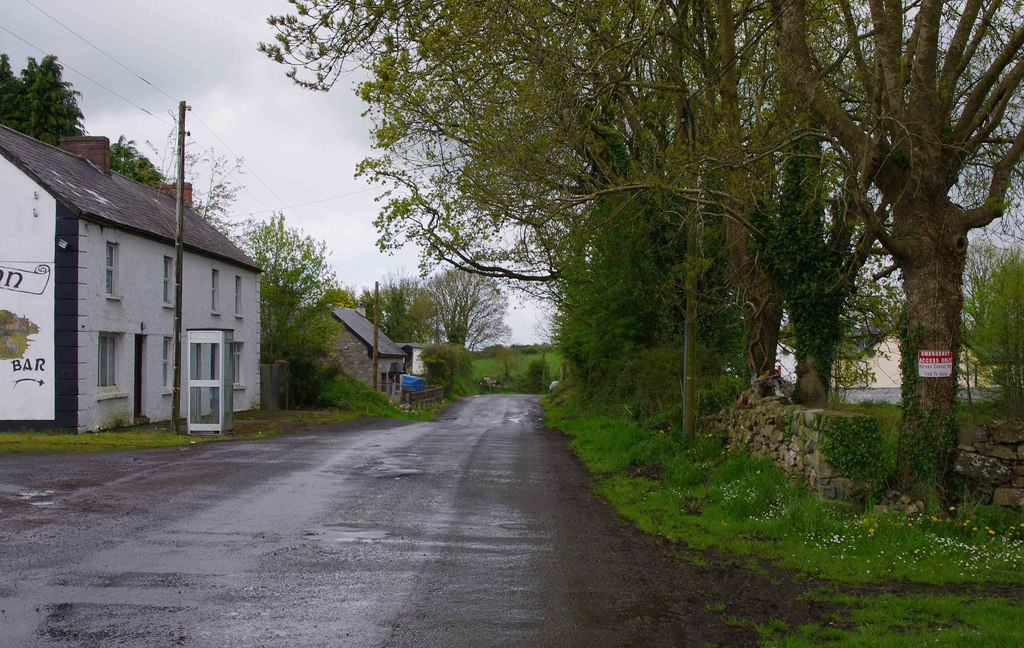
- Road passing the Spancilhill Inn

- Location in Ireland
- Coordinates: 52°52′16″N 8°54′01″W
- Country: Ireland
- Province: Munster
- County: County Clare
- Townland: Muckinish
- Time zone: UTC+0 (WET)
  - Summer (DST): UTC-1 (IST (WEST))

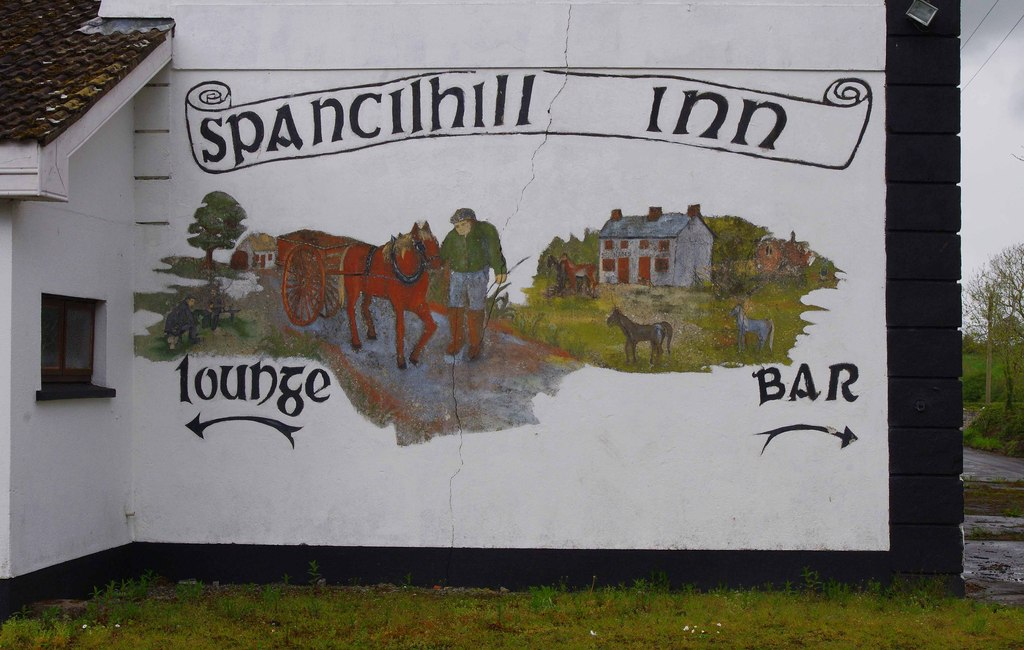
Spancilhill Inn

Spancill Hill or Spancilhill (Ordnance Survey spelling Spancel Hill for the hill and settlement, Spancelhill for the electoral division; Irish: Cnoc Uarchoille) is a hill and adjacent dispersed settlement in County Clare, Ireland. The historic hamlet of Spancilhill was by the fair green, which is still the site of the Spancill Hill Fair, which occurs annually on 23 June. Houses are concentrated slightly south at Cross of Spancilhill, where the R352 road between Ennis to the west and Tulla to the east crosses a local road between Barefield to the north and Quin to the south.

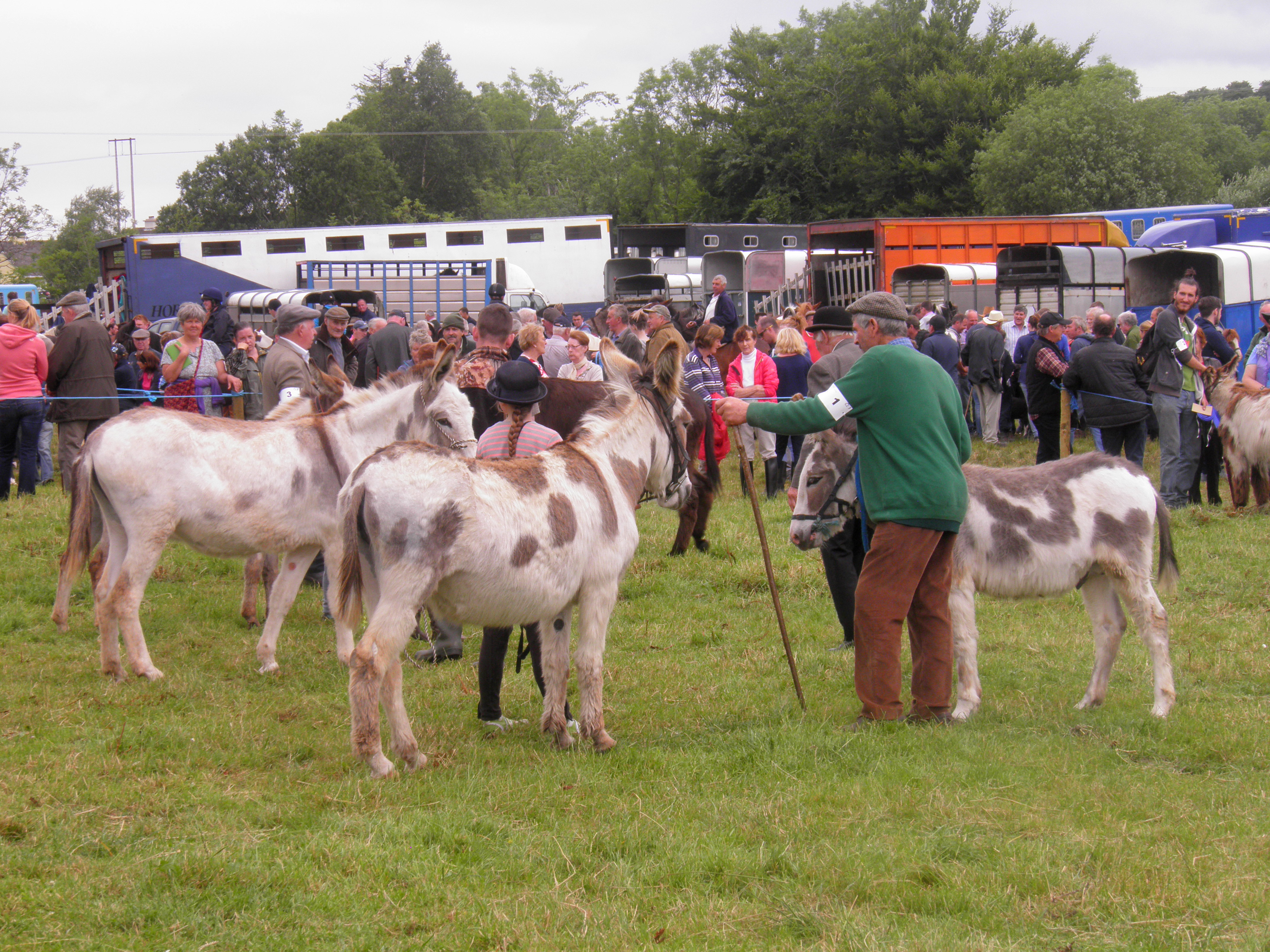
Horse fair at Spancil Hill.

== Name ==
The original Irish name was Cnoc Fhuar Choille ["Cold Wood Hill"], which was misinterpreted as Cnoc Urchaill ["Spancel Hill"]. A spancel is a rope used to tie an animal's legs together; the association of the place with a horse fair encouraged the misinterpretation. The hill itself was called Knockrughil on the 1842 six-inch Ordnance Survey map and 1896 25-inch map.

== History ==
Spancel Hill is in the townland of Muckinish, civil parish of Clooney, and barony of Bunratty Upper. The fair had a royal charter from Charles II. Historically, fairs were held on 1 January, 3 May, 24 June, 20 August, and 3 December. In 1913, British and Continental cavalry forces bought over 1,000 horses there.

In 1841 the population of the village was 169, in 26 houses. In 1851, after the Great Famine, there were fewer than 20 houses, so its population was not recorded separately from the townland, whose total population had fallen from 278 in 46 houses to 174 in 34. In 1911 the townland population was 72, in 14 houses.

== See also ==
- "Spancil Hill", a song written in a traditional Irish folk style by Michael Considine, a local who emigrated to America.
