= Spancil Hill =

Irish folk song written by Michael Considine

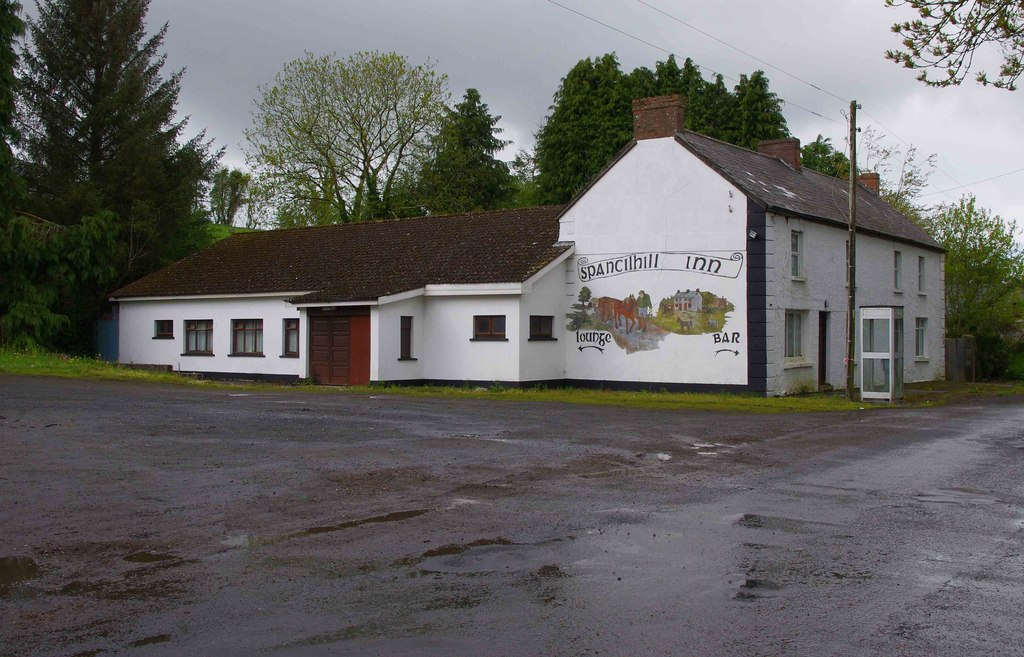
The Spancilhill Inn

"Spancil Hill" (Roud 22062, in original spelling "Spancilhill"), is a traditional Irish folk ballad composed by Michael Considine (1850–73), who was born in Spancil Hill and migrated to the US. It bemoans the plight of the Irish emigrants who so longed for home from their new lives in America. This song is sung by a man who longs for his home in Spancill Hill, County Clare, his friends and the love he left there. All the characters and places in this song are real.

== History ==
Spancil Hill is located in Muckinish townland, parish of Clooney, Bunratty Upper barony, County Clare, Ireland, just outside Ennis on the road to Tulla. Spancil Hill Fair is one of the oldest horse fairs in Ireland. It is held annually on 23 June. Spancil refers to the practice of "spancilling," which was to use a short rope to tie an animal's left fore-leg to its right hind leg, thereby hobbling the animal and stopping it from wandering too far.

Michael Considine was born in August 1850 close to Spancil Hill Crossroads, in the townland of Castletown, Doora, County Clare Civil Parish, Doora Electoral Division, barony of Bunratty Upper, County Clare. He was baptized on 11 August 1850 (page No. 204, entry No. 6051, in the Roman Catholic Baptism register of the parish of Clooney, Bunratty Upper). His father's name was Peter and his mother's was Mary, née Rogers. His siblings mentioned in the song, Pat & Ellen, also appear in the said baptism register. His godparents were John McGannon and Bridget Daffy. He was related to Michael Considine, the secretary of the guild of trades in Ennis town and also the election agent, in the 1852 United Kingdom general election, for Sir Edward Fitzgerald, the 3rd Baronet of the FitzGerald baronets, of Newmarket on Fergus. At the time of Griffith's Valuation in 1855, the family had rented a farm of 20 acres from Henry Moloney in Muckinish townland, Clooney parish, which was situated just two fields to the west of Spancilhill Fair Green, where the fair was held. There were five cottages on the farm, which Peter sublet to tenants. In 1851, after the Great Famine, there were fewer than 20 houses in Spancilhill, so its population was not recorded separately from the townland, whose total population had fallen from 278 in 46 houses to 174 in 34.

Considine emigrated to the United States of America around 1870. He left intending to make enough money to send for his sweetheart so they could be married. Her name was Mary MacNamara, and she is mentioned in the song as 'Mack the Ranger's daughter'. She was probably the daughter of his neighbour in Castletown townland, Michael McNamara and his wife, Margaret, née Culligan. Mary was baptized on 3 August 1851 (page No. 205, entry No. 6108, in the Roman Catholic Baptism register of the parish of Clooney, Bunratty Upper). The tailor Quigley mentioned in the song was probably Michael Quigley who is listed in the above Griffith's Valuation as a tenant of Considine's father Peter, as Michael's son Patrick was described as a tailor in the 1901 census. The Father Dan mentioned was Fr. Daniel Corbett. He was ordained in Maynooth seminary in 1832 and served as parish priest from 1836 to 1893. The musician Martin Moylan, who played at the fair, was probably the man who is listed in the above Griffith's Valuation as living in the adjoining townland of Knockaluskraun.

Considine worked in Boston for two years or so before moving to California. In failing health, he wrote the poem in memory of the hometown he would not live to see again, and posted it to his young nephew in Ireland. Michael Considine trained as an accountant and died in California in 1873 at the age of 23, probably from TB.

The rendition of the late singer/songwriter Robbie McMahon, who died in 2012 at the age of eighty-six, is widely regarded as the definitive version of Spancil Hill.

The best known version of the song is that sung by the Dubliners and Christy Moore, which is highly abbreviated and makes a number of changes to the lyrics – for example renaming the protagonist "Johnny" instead of "Mike", and describing his love as daughter of a farmer instead of the local ranger.

== Lyrics ==
The below version is the one sung by Robert McMahon which is considered to be closest to Michael Considine's original poem.

Spancilhill

Last night as I laid dreaming of the pleasant days gone by,
My mind being bent on rambling and to Erin's Isle I did fly.
I stepped on board a vision, I sailed out with a will,
And I quickly came to anchor at my home in Spancilhill.

Enchanted with the novelty, delighted with the scenes,
Where in my early childhood I often times have been.
I thought I heard a murmur, I think I hear it still,
'Tis that little stream of water at the Cross of Spancilhill.

And to amuse my fancy I laid upon the ground,
Where all my school companions in crowds assembled 'round.
Some have grown to manhood, while more their graves did fill,
Oh I thought we were all young again at the Cross of Spancilhill.

It being on a Sabbath morning, I thought I heard a bell,
O'er hills and vallies sounded, in notes that seemed to tell,
That Father Dan was coming his duty to fulfill,
At the parish church of Clooney, just one mile from Spancilhill.

And when the ceremony ended, we all knelt down in prayer,
In hopes for to be ready to climb the Golden Stairs.
And when back home returning, we danced with right good will,
To Martin Moylan's music at the Cross of Spancilhill.

It being on the twenty third of June, the day before the fair,
Sure Erin's sons and daughters, they all assembled there.
The young, the old, the stout and the bold came there to sport and kill,
What a curious combination at the Fair of Spancilhill.

I went into my old home, as every stone can tell,
The old boreen was just the same and the apple tree over the well,
I missed my sister Ellen, my brothers Pat and Bill,
And I only met strange faces at my home in Spancilhill.

I called to see the neighbors, to hear what they might say,
The old were getting feeble and the young ones turning grey.
I met with tailor Quigley, he's as stout as ever still,
Sure he used to mend my breeches when I lived in Spancilhill.

I paid a flying visit to my first and only love,
She's as pure as any lily and as gentle as a dove.
She threw her arms around me, saying: Mike I love you still,
She is Mack the Ranger's daughter, the Pride of Spancilhill.

I thought I stooped to kiss her, as I did in days of yore,
Says she: Mike you're only joking, as you often were before,
The cock crew on the roost again, he crew both loud and shrill,
And I awoke in California, far far from Spancilhill.

But when my vision faded, the tears came in my eyes,
In hope to see that dear old spot some day before I die.
May the Almighty King of Angels His Choicest Blessings spill,
On that Glorious spot of Nature, the Cross of Spancilhill.

== Melody ==
The lyrics were set to the 19th century tune My Bonny Irish Boy.

== Recordings ==
Spancil Hill has been recorded by:

- Joe Bethancourt (a folk version titled "Beacon Hill")
- Patrick Clifford
- The Corrs (2005)
- Cruachan
- Derina Harvey Band
- Dropkick Murphys (as "Fairmount Hill" with changes setting the song in Massachusetts)
- The Dubliners
- Mary Duff
- Geasa
- The High Kings
- Niall Horan
- Johnny Logan
- Jim McCann
- Johnny McEvoy
- Christy Moore
- Hazel O'Connor
- Peat and Diesel
- The Prodigals (to the tune of "(Ghost) Riders in the Sky")
- Rapalje
- Paddy Reilly
- Ryan's Fancy
- Maggie Sansone
- Tir na n'Og
- The Wolfe Tones
- Brendan Shine
- Present Artist X (as "The Cross at Spancil Hill")
- Loughlin
- Madra Salach

== See also ==
- List of Irish ballads
- Music of Ireland
