= Templemaley =

Civil parish in County Clare, Ireland

Templemaley Teampall Uí Mháille
- Civil parish
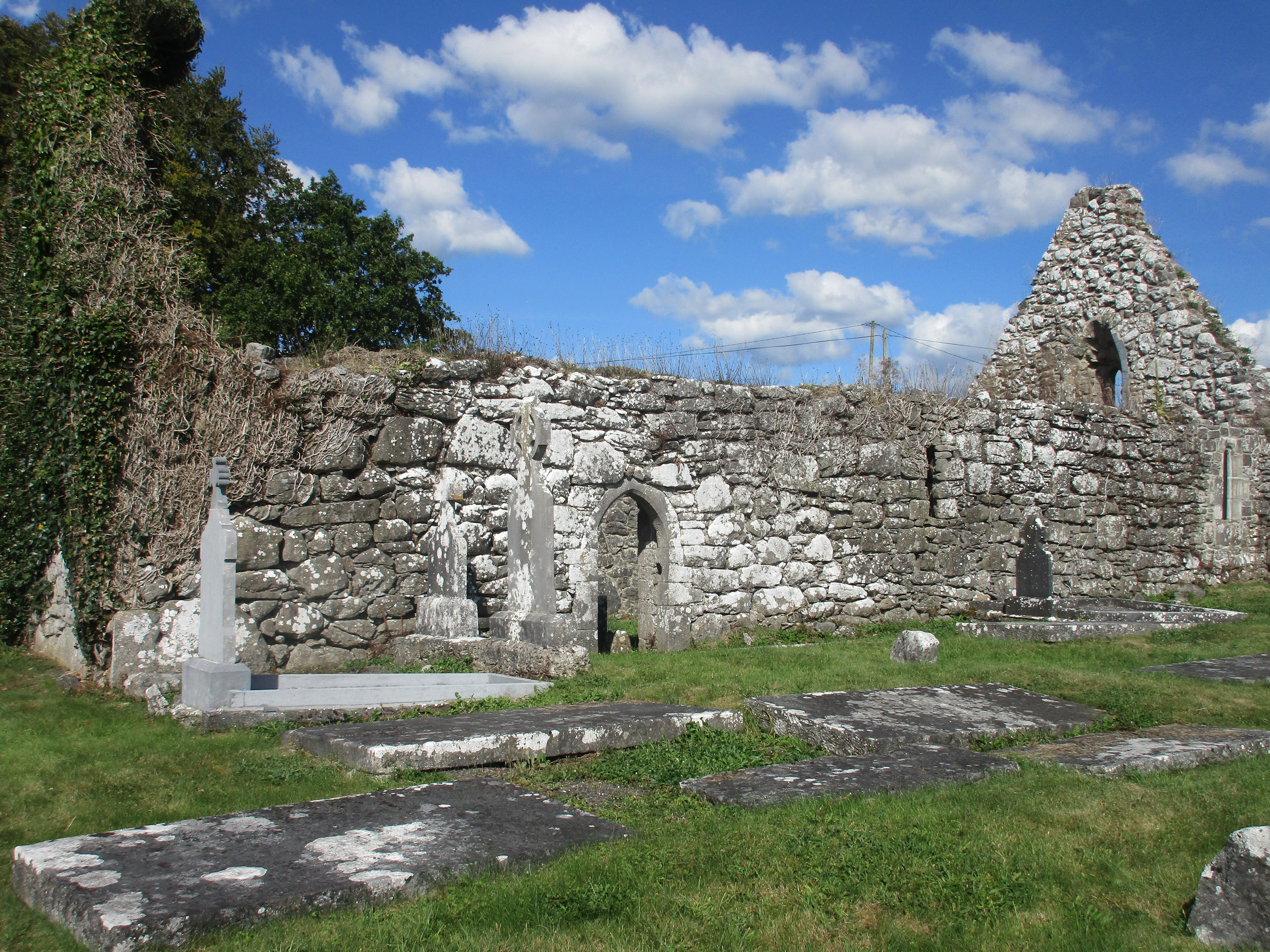
- Templemaley Church ruins

- Location within Ireland
- Coordinates: 52°53′04″N 8°59′06″W
- Country: Ireland
- Province: Munster
- County: County Clare
- Time zone: UTC+0 (WET)
  - Summer (DST): UTC-1 (IST (WEST))

Templemaley (Irish: Teampall Uí Mháille) is a civil parish in County Clare, Ireland. It contains the village of Barefield and part of the town of Ennis.

== Location ==
The parish of Templemaley is in the barony of Bunratty Upper, 2.5 miles (4.0 km) east of Ennis. It is 4.5 by 2.75 miles (7.24 by 4.43 km) and covers 4,648 acres (1,881 ha). Dromore Lough lies on the north boundary. The land slopes down from there to the River Fergus opposite Ennis. Lough Ballyallia is on the south-western boundary and Lough Cleggan on the western boundary. In 1841 the population was 1,634 in 251 houses.

== Roman Catholic Church ==
By 1837 the medieval Roman Catholic parish was part of a union with the parish of Doora. The church of The Immaculate Conception is in Barefield.

== Facilities ==
The Barefield National School is run by the Doora-Barefield parish. St Josephs Doora-Barefield GAA is the local Gaelic Athletic Association club. It has its ground at Gurteen.

== Antiquities ==
The parish appears to be named after the same saint as the parish of Kilmaley, but there are no records that discuss him. As of 1893 his church, which had a very plain architecture, was still in reasonable condition. There were no other ancient ecclesiastical buildings in the parish. There is one holy well dedicated to Ingean Baoth, the patroness of Killanaboy parish. There were three old castles in Templemaley. One at Ballyallia belonged to Dr. James Neylan in 1580. It has been completely demolished. A castle at Ballycarrol belonged to Conor M‘Clancy in that year. The third castle, at Drumeen, does not appear in the 1580 list and may not have been standing at the time.

== Townlands ==
Townlands are Ardcarney, Ballyallia, Ballycarroll, Ballycorey, Ballyduff (Blake), Ballyduff (Paterson), Ballyhee, Ballymaley, Ballymaquiggin, Ballymulqueeny, Barefield or Gortlumman, Cappahard, Cloonteen, Cragaweelcross, Derry, Dulick, Faunrusk, Inishmore, Killian, Knockaclara, Knockaderry, Knockanoura, Licknaun, Newpark, Nutfield and Reaskaun.

The townlands of Ballycorey, Cappahard, Dulick, Knockaderry, and Knockanoura are in the town of Ennis.
