= Carntemple =

Ruined church in County Clare, Ireland

- Location within Ireland
- 52.838647°N 8.911838°W
- Country: Ireland
- Denomination: Roman Catholic

History
- Status: Ruined
- Founded: c. 480
- Founder: Saint Brecan

Specifications
- Materials: Stone

Administration
- Parish: Doora, County Clare

Carntemple, once known as Kilbrecan, is a ruined church in the civil parish of Doora, County Clare, Ireland. It may date back to 480 AD. Little remains except the massive foundations.

== Location ==
According to the antiquarian Thomas Johnson Westropp, "Brought into contact with the pagans of the Corcomroes, Brecan probably conceived the idea of founding a mission in the centre of the present county Clare; and with that wonderful genius and power of selection of strategic positions, so generally displayed by the Irish missionaries, he fixed his establishment at a place called Noughaval, in the district of Magh Adhair. It was a low green ridge, not far from the Fergus, and commanding a view across the whole plain of Clare to Burren, Echtge, and Slieve Bernagh; here he built a church, which formed an independent parish of Kilbrecan, down to, at any rate, the fourteenth century. The name is still preserved in two adjoining townlands, but the massive “cyclopean” foundations of the little oratory are now called Carntemple, and the holy well is Tubberdooran. History has justified his choice - all traffic, and commerce, and warfare have since passed by his monastery."

Carntemple or Kilbreckan lies in an area rich in ancient religious buildings. Westropp writes elsewhere, "Less than a mile to the north [of Clare Abbey] the grim stone faces on the ivied church of Doora stare across the swamp. Little over a mile to the east stands the venerable church of Killoe (Killuga in 1302), the cell of some Lingad, perhaps the earlier patron of Killaloe. About a mile from Killoe, the "Cyclopean" foundations, rude earthworks and well of Kilbrecan or Carntemple, mark the monastery, traditionally the earliest in Clare, founded towards the end of the fifth century by Brecan, son of Eocliy Baillderg, one of the earliest evangelisers of Thomond and Aran."

An 1842 map notes that the church was in ruins and shows it in the northern part of Noughaval townland, about 200 metres (660 ft) from the main road running through the townland, now the L-4114 local road. The map shows a burial ground for children beside the ruined church.

== Foundation ==
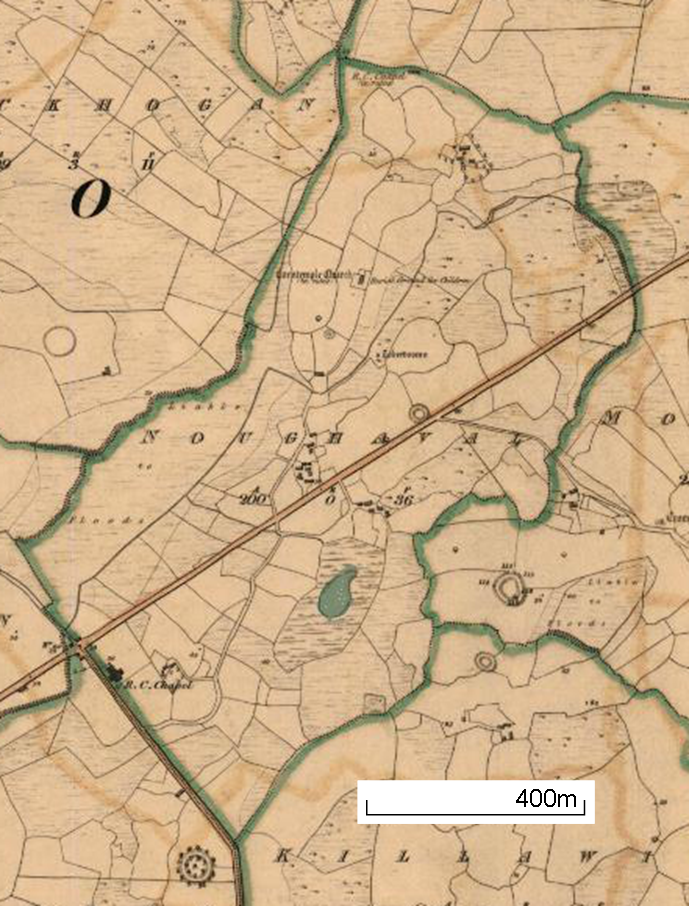
1842 map showing Noughaval townland, Doora. The ruined Carntemple church is in the north, with a burial ground for children.

Westropp wrote elsewhere, "Brecan founded three churches, not far to the east of Ennis; Kilbrecan, or Carntemple, whose massive but nearly levelled and overgrown walls lie near the well of Toberdoon, not far from Kilbrecan chapel; Doora, or Durinierkin, a venerable church, mainly of the 10th or 11th century, near Ennis station, and Clooney Church, where he was venerated as St. Rikin."

James Frost wrote "In the history of St. Breccan of Arran it is stated that he founded a church in Dalcais called after his name. In Doora parish there is a townland called Kilbreckan, and in that townland stands a ruined church named Carrantemple. (Note: In fact Carntemple is in Noughaval townland, just east of Kilbreckan townland, but it is also known as Kilbrecan.)" Now, the old edifice in question must be the church founded by St. Breccan. Its characteristics are those of a building of very great antiquity.

== Description ==
Westropp describes the ruin briefly in 1900: "20 by 10 feet. The very ancient and massive foundations of an oratory (some of the stones over 6 feet long) in the townland of Noughaval, and called Carntemple. It marks the site of Kilbrecan, one of the first mission churches of Thomond. Founder, Brecan, c. A.D. 480. “Kellbrakyn,” 1302, being then a separate parish."

== See also ==
- Doora Church, another ruined church nearby

== Sources ==
- 1842 Ordnance Survey 6-Inch Maps of County Clare, Clare County Library
- Frost, James (1893). "Part I. Topography of Thomond Chapter 4. Ui Caisin". The History and Topography of the County of Clare.
- Hull, Graham (15 October 2008). "N18 Ennis Bypass and N85 Western Relief Road Clare Abbey, Co. Clare - Final Archaeological Excavation Report for Clare County Council" (PDF).
- Westropp, Thomas Johnson (1893). "Ancient Remains Near Lisdoonvarna" (PDF). Journal of the Royal Society of Antiquaries of Ireland.
- Westropp, Thomas Johnson (1900). "Barony of Bunratty Upper". The Churches of County Clare.
- Westropp, Thomas Johnson (1900b). "Spread of Christianity in Thomond". The Churches of County Clare.
- Westropp, Thomas Johnson (1901). "Augustinian Houses of the County Clare, etc". Journal of the Royal Society of Antiquaries of Ireland. Archived from the original on 3 March 2016.
