= Crusheen (Inchicronan) =

Civil parish in County Clare, Ireland

Crusheen − Croisín Inchicronan − Inse Chrónáin
- Civil parish
- Location in Ireland
- Coordinates: 52°56′19″N 8°53′49″W
- Country: Ireland
- Province: Munster
- County: County Clare
- Time zone: UTC+0 (WET)
  - Summer (DST): UTC-1 (IST (WEST))

Crusheen (Irish: Croisín), formerly called Inchicronan (Irish: Inse Chrónáin), is a civil parish in County Clare, Ireland. There is also a catholic parish Crusheen, covering the same area. The parish lies to the northeast of Ennis. It contains the villages of Crusheen and Ballinruan.

== Location ==
The civil parish of Inchicronan is in the Bunratty Upper barony, about 5.25 miles (8.45 km) north of Ennis. It is 5 by 3.5 miles (8.0 by 5.6 km) and covers 17,438 acres (7,057 ha), of which 597 acres (242 ha) are water. The land is mostly rough, rocky upland. Lough Inchicronan is over 1.25 miles (2.01 km) long, and lies on the southern border of the parish. The road from Ennis to Gort runs near the west side of the lake.

== Antiquities ==
Knocknacullia fort and the structure called the Giant's Grave are in the angle of the parish nearest to Spancil Hill.

The parish is named after Saint Cronán, but it is not known which of the various saints by this name it refers to. Possibly he is the same saint as that of Roscrea and Tomgraney. His church was sited in the peninsula between the two arms of Lough Inchicronan. In 1190 Donald O'Brien, king of Munster, founded an abbey for Canons Regular on an islet in Inchicronan lake. The church was removed to make space for the abbey. The abbey is very dilapidated.

The church and burial-ground of Kilvoydane are in far end of the parish near Spancil Hill. Kiltolagh church and graveyard is in the townland of Carrowmore. It is named after St. Tolagh, who was also the patron of the parish of Dysert. The parish also holds the ruined churches of Kilvakee and Kilvilly, and there is a graveyard at Doonmulvihill but no trace of a church. There are five holy wells, Tobarmacduach, Toberineenboy, Tobernaneeve, Toberbreeda, and Kilvoydan.

The ruins of the castle of Inchicronan stand near the lake. It is not included in the 1580 list of castles. The castle at Doonmulvihill belonged to Owen MacSweeney in 1580. The population in 1841 was 5,118 in 866 houses. Of these, 4,924 in 834 houses were in rural areas.

== Townlands ==
Townlands are Ballinruan, Ballygassan, Ballynagranagh, Ballyscanlan, Ballyvanna, Bunnahow, Caher, Caheraphuca, Calluragh, Cappafeean, Cappamore, Cappanapeasta, Carrahil, Carrowkeel Beg, Carrowkeel More, Carrownacloghy, Cloonagowan, Cloonawillin, Clooneen, Cloonmoney, Crusheen, Derrygarriff, Derrymore, Derrynagleragh, Derryvet, Doon, Drumbonniv, Drumcore, Drummanneen, Drumminacknew, Drumsallagh, Drumumna, Durra, Gortaficka, Gortaniska, Gortlurkaun, Gortnamearacaun, Inchicronan Island, Kilvoydan North, Kilvoydan South, Knockaloaghan, Knockmael East, Knockmael West, Knocknamucky, Knockreddan, Lahardan, Obrienscastle, Parkalough, Scalpnagown, Sranagalloon and Sunnagh.
