= Ballyhannon Castle =

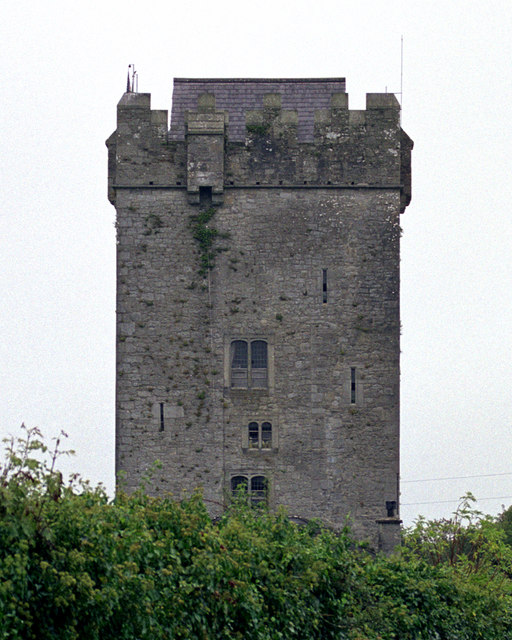
- Ballyhannon (Castlefergus) Castle

- Location within Ireland
- 52.8014°N 8.9082°W
- Location: 3 km (1.9 mi) south west of Quin, County Clare, Ireland

History
- Built: 15th century

Ballyhannon Castle is a medieval Irish castle dating back to the 15th century, located near the village of Quin in County Clare, on the west coast of Ireland. It is fully intact and in the Irish Governmental records it is registered as a National Monument and "Listed/Protected" structure, intended to protect its historic, architectural and aesthetic significance.

== History ==
The castle of Ballyhannon, also known in later times as Castlefergus, most likely from its proximity to the River Fergus, is a towerhouse of atypical internal design within the context of the County Clare group of towerhouses. The castle stands in the townland of Castlefergus close to Latoon Creek, which itself feeds into the River Fergus. Ballyhannon townlands (both north and south) lie to the north east of the castle. The older spelling, Ballyhannan, is retained in these townland names. The townland name can be translated as O'Hannan's or O'Hannon's home. Although there are many substantial families of Hannon in Munster and Connaught, the name seldom appears in the annals of medieval Ireland.

The death in 1266 of Maelisa O'Hannen, prior of Roscommon, is one of the few such entries. In the census of 1659 the name was found in considerable numbers in the Barony of Bunratty. The prefix O, was dropped in the submergence of Gaelic Ireland and has not been resumed. Strictly speaking Hannon is the anglicised form of the Gaelic Ó hAnnáin, a name chiefly associated with Co. Limerick. It was common at the end of the sixteenth century in many parts of Connaught and Munster. The Hannons or Ó hAnnáin are a Dalcassian sept of noble Milesian ancestry whose members attained the status of knighthood, and whose patrimonial lands were in this area, south of Quin. Their name is still retained in the townlands of Ballyhannan north and Ballyhannan south. Although the Hannon name is remembered in the name of Ballyhannon Castle, their history is of an earlier period and no references to the family can be found in connection with the history of the castle itself.

The castle was built about 1490 by Hugh, and possibly Síoda, sons of Donnchadh MacNamara. This period was described by the noted antiquarian, T. J. Westropp, as the "Golden Age of castle-building in Thomond" because of the high standard of construction which had been achieved by the masons at this period. Although Ballyhannon Castle was the home of the MacNamaras for many centuries, there are some references to the O'Briens, on whose lands it stood, in relation to its history. For example in the year 1560, a grant was made by Queen Elizabeth I (7 September 1533 – 24 March 1603) to Conor O'Brien (c.1534 - 1581), Earl of Thomond, of Ballyhannon Castle, and several other castles, previously held by Donnell O'Brien; "To hold in tail male, by service of one knight's fee", meaning that the property would pass onto his male heirs, subject to military service to the Queen. In the lists of the castles of the county for the years 1570 and 1574 Ballyhannon Castle was owned by Covea Riogh MacNamara, son of Mahon. Some transcriptions of these lists record the castle as being owned by William Neylon. This was due to an error in aligning the columns during the transcription of the original manuscript lists.

A fireplace with the inscription "H.T.E. 1576" was recorded by Westropp & Twigge in the 1890s, as being in the castle. This was one of the earliest dated fireplaces in the county, though it cannot now be located within the castle. In 1586 Queen Elizabeth I issued a pardon to Hugh, son of Covea MacNamara, of Ballyhannon Castle for being in rebellion. He had to provide sureties for his future good behaviour and answer at the local courts as requested. In the 1626 rental of the 5th Earl of Thomond, Henry O'Brien (c.1588 - 1639), Ballyhannon Castle was listed as being rented to one Robert Hawksworth, with one quarter of land for the sum of £4.00. It is likely that Hawksworth was one of the many English Protestant settlers brought into the county by the O'Briens and settled on the O'Brien properties in Thomond during this period. The settling of English Protestants on lands of the native Irish Catholics precipitated the 1641 rebellion and many records exist of the Irish despoiling the settlers and turning them out of their newly acquired lands and properties. The MacNamaras of Ballyhannon acted no differently from the other displaced Irish. John Smith of Latoon complained of his losses which, "amounted to £1,354, including his lease for life of Lattoon, and his outlay upon buildings and sea embankments." He complained that Oliver Delahoyde of Fomerla Castle in Tulla, "with fifty men came, on the night of 15 January 1642, and stripped him of part of his goods. The work of spoliation was subsequently completed by the MacNamaras of Ballyhannon" among others. Most of the Irish landowners who took part in this rebellion were later stripped of their possessions. Among those noted as having forfeited their property after the rebellion was Mahone MacNamara of Ballyhannon. His property was disposed of to Pierce Creagh (a Protestant settler) and to the Earl of Thomond, Barnabas O'Brien (c.1590 - 1657), 6th Earl. After the rebellion, the Cromwellian campaign attempted to complete the subjugation of the native Irish, and many of their castles were dismantled by the Commonwealth forces to render them defenceless. Ballyhannon appears to have escaped this destruction and a sketch of the castle in 1675, which survives in the "Edenvale Survey", shows it to have been roofed and in good condition. The castle appears to be surrounded by a bawn wall with a gate and loophole windows at this time. With the assention to the English throne of the Catholic King James II (14 October 1633 – 16 September 1701) in 1685, the fate of the native Irish improved somewhat for a time. Ballyhannon Castle was one of the castles noted by Sir Daniel O'Brien, Viscount Clare, as being suitable for the imprisonment of Protestant settlers who were now being dispossessed. A letter written in 1689 describing the events of the time is worth recording. "Take every one of them that are young (Seir or Mr.), and let the common sort lie in the prison, and the rest strictly guarded, or rather put into some strong castle that has a geate to be locked on the outside like Ballyhannon". Pierce Creagh who had received part of the MacNamara property at Ballyhannon after the rebellion was named as one of those to be imprisoned in the above letter from Sir Daniel O'Brien. The castle is also mentioned in 1690 when Thomas Hickman, who seemed to be living in fear during another upsurge in the conflict, asked Sir Donough O'Brien to collect some of his belongings from Ballyhannon Castle and to keep other possessions of his in a safe place, as he expected the castle was soon to be garrisoned.

The castle appears on Henry Pelham's "Grand Jury" map of 1787 under the names Ballyhannon and Castlefergus, which is the first time Castlefergus appears as the name of the castle. Hely Dutton, writing in 1808, records the castle as: "Fergus – inhabited and lately white-washed! ". There are also some references to the Blood family of Castlefergus, though these relate most likely to Castlefergus House which stood south west of the castle and is now demolished. Charlotte Blood, daughter of William Blood, who was murdered at his house at Applevale near Corofin, married her cousin Matthew Henry Blood, M.D. of Castlefergus in 1831. Westropp, writing in 1917 notes some curious traces of settlement in the fields at Castlefergus, most likely the remains of ringforts and other early Bronze Age habitation sites. Samuel Lewis, writing, in 1837, notes Castlefergus as: "The fine modern residence" of William Smith Blood Esq. He adds: "adjoining which are the remains of the ancient edifice", telling us that by this date the castle was uninhabited, probably for the first time in 350 years. By 1858 the castle was ivy-covered and described as: "a fine old green-mantled tower" on the grounds of Castlefergus House.

The American millionaire and oil heiress Elizabeth Phillips (of Phillips Petroleum) and her husband Henry D. Irwin, who chose to call it "Ballyhannan Castle", (using the older townland spelling), restored the building to its former glory in 1970. It is currently rented out to top-of-the-market tourists as an out-of-the-way destination. It was also home to rock stars and several American film stars during film making in the region.

Robert Twigge describes the castle in the early 1900s as follows: "The castle stands on a low rock, scarped to the west and had no outworks, (the bawn noted in 1675 having been removed by this time). The very perfect tower, measuring 33 1/2 ft × 24 ft (10.2 m × 7.3 m), is in excellent preservation, having been inhabited in the last century. The pointed south door is defended by a shot-hole on the left and a murder hole above. The stair mounts round the s.w. angle, and at the 14th step a long corridor with 2 lights in the w. wall is reached. At the n. end a spiral staircase of 72 steps leads to the top. At the 12th step from the corridor another passage through the n. wall is reached. 5 curved steps at the s. end of the w. corridor lead to a similar passage along the s. wall over the porch and lodge. There is a handsome trefoil headed window of 2 lights in the s.w. angle and a garderobe to the s.e. angle. Mounting the spiral stair still higher other corridors, over the lower ones, in the w. and s. sides, are reached. There are 4 main stories under the stone vault forming the roof. The basement story has very deep recesses under the corridor and the 2 on the n. side have a narrow chamfered screen between them. A fireplace bears the date 1576, but this was of course a later addition to the building".
