= Doora Church =

Church in County Clare, Ireland

- St Brecan's
- Location within Ireland
- 52.840324°N 8.960577°W
- Country: Ireland
- Denomination: Roman Catholic

History
- Status: Ruined
- Founded: c. 500
- Founder: Saint Brecan

Specifications
- Materials: Stone

Administration
- Parish: Doora, County Clare

Doora Church (Irish: Teampull Dúrain), also known as St Brecan, Doora, is a ruined church in the civil parish of Doora, County Clare, Ireland. It may date back to 500 AD, although it has been extensively reworked since then.

== History ==
The church may have been founded by Saint Brecan around 500 AD. If Brecan was the founder, as tradition states, it would have been one of the first central mission churches in Clare. It is mentioned in 1189. At this time the church, which is near Kilbrecan, was called Durinierekin. Brecan also founded what is now called Carntemple about 2 miles (3.2 km) to the east of Doora Church. An 1842 map notes that the church was in ruins and shows it about 200 metres (660 ft) southwest of what was then the hamlet of Doora, which lay in the west of the townland of Ballaghboy in the parish of Doora. The church itself lies in the townland of Bunnow. It is about 300 metres (980 ft) east of the River Fergus, opposite the town of Ennis.

== Description ==
=== O'Donovan and Curry 1839 ===
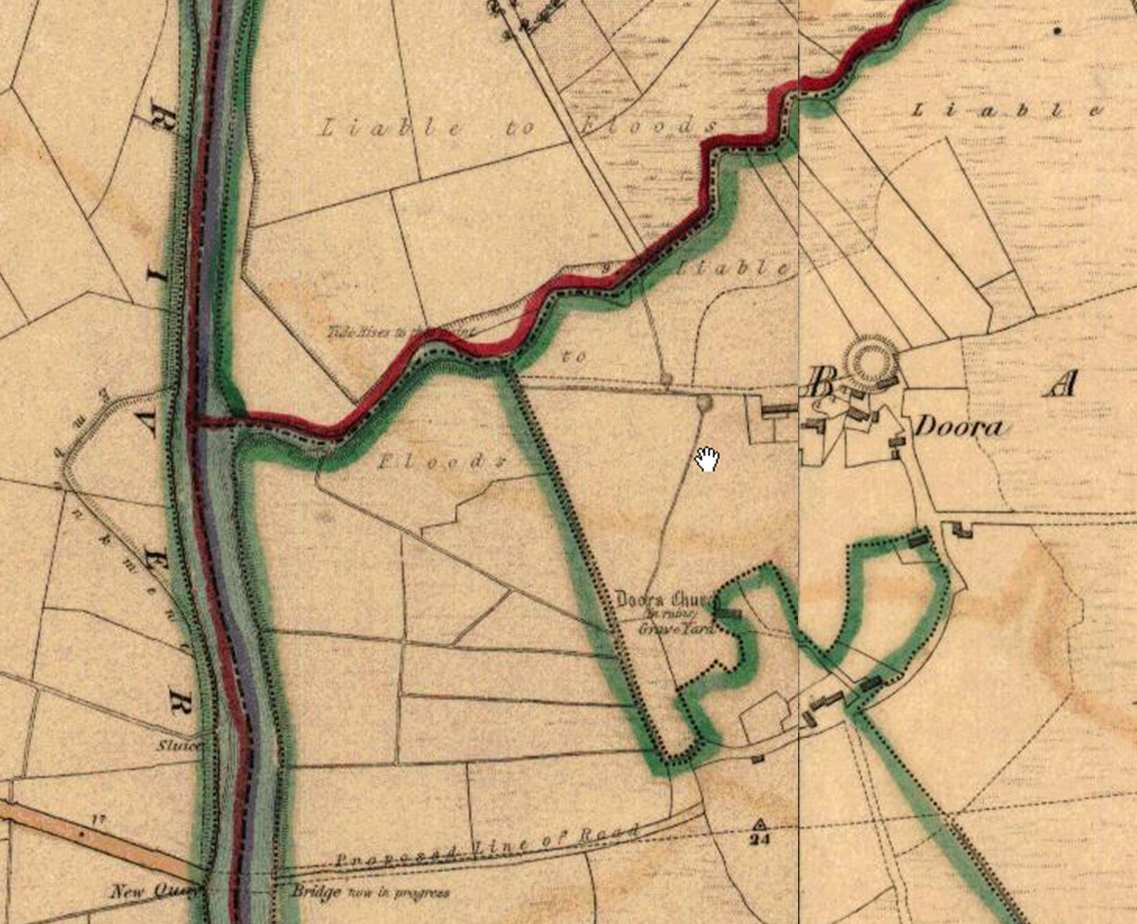
1842 Ordnance Survey map showing the ruined church and the hamlet of Doora

According to John O'Donovan and Eugene O'Curry, writing in 1839:

The old Church of Dúiré is situated in the middle of a bog, about one mile to the south east of the Abbey of Ennis. It is a Church of considerable antiquity and was remodelled at an early period. It measures on the inside fifty nine feet in length and twenty three feet eight inches in breadth. The west gable, which was not of the original work, is all destroyed with the exception of two fragments attached to the two walls; the fragment at the south west corner six feet in length and about seventeen feet in height, and that at the north west corner three feet in length and of the same height with the north wall. At the distance of thirteen feet three inches of the west gable the south wall contains a doorway now reduced on the outside to a formless breach; on the inside it is also very much injured, but it can be ascertained from what remains of it that it was seven feet four inches in height to the springing of the arch and four feet ten inches in width. There is a stone projecting from the wall on the outside over this doorway with the head of some animal rudely shaped on it.

At the distance of thirteen feet seven inches to the east of this doorway there is in the same wall a very ancient window, round-headed inside and outside. On the inside it is five feet three inches from the present level of the ground, eight feet high and five feet in width, and on the outside four feet in height and in breadth (width) five inches at top and seven and a half inches at the bottom. At the distance of eleven feet eight inches to the east of this window there is another nearly of the same shape, but not so ancient, it having been evidently inserted to match the former when the Church was remodelled. It is placed at the height of five feet from the present level of the ground on the inside, and measures on the inside seven feet seven inches in height and four feet six inches in breadth (width) and on the outside three feet eight inches in height, and in width four and a half inches at top and five and a half inches at the bottom. The former of these windows has a channel and rope (rabbit) on the outside and a representation of the head and breast of a very large dog (evidently the Irish wolf dog) placed at the height of one foot over it; the latter window has not the channel (architrave) or rope (cable moulding) and the only ornament it exhibits is a semicircle raised on the stone which forms its top.

Within two feet six inches of the south east corner there is in the east gable a pointed recess (like a doorway) measuring six feet one inch in height and two feet five inches in breadth and extending about half the thickness of the wall. This was certainly constructed when the Church was remodelled. Besides this, the east gable contains two windows which were once very beautiful but now much effaced. They are round-headed inside and outside, and constructed of beautifully chiselled grit. The southern one measures on the inside nine feet six inches in height and six feet in width, but it is disfigured on the outside except at the top, where the stone in which the top of the little arch is formed remains untouched. From this it appears that the width at top was (is) four and a half inches; it was probably six or seven inches at bottom, but it cannot now be ascertained with much certainty. The northern window in this gable is of the same height and breadth with the other, but it certainly is not so old. Like the other, it is destroyed on the outside except the top stone in which its round head is formed. This stone is lime, but the head of the other is grit. The former has the channel and rope (rabbit) on the outside, the latter has the rope but the channel not so deep.

The north wall contains a semi-Cyclopean doorway placed eleven feet from the east gable and measuring on the outside five feet six inches from the present level of the field and in width two feet four inches at top and two feet five inches at bottom. Its lintel is three feet nine inches long, seven inches thick, and extends the entire thickness of the wall. This doorway led into an Iardom, the site of which is still faintly traceable. It resembles the southern doorway on the Cathedral of Glendalough which led into a similar lateral (Iardom) building. There were two buttresses placed at the north west and south west corners, but they are nearly destroyed; they were manifestly built when the Church was remodelled.

That part of the north wall extending forty two feet in length is of the original work to the height of twelve feet; the remaining four feet of its height is modern. All the east gable was certainly rebuilt. It is my opinion that this gable originally contained but one window, and this the more southern one above described, which was first placed in the middle of the gable, but when the Church was remodelled it was removed some feet out of its original position, and this northern one placed alongside it, and constructed, as well as the taste of the times would allow, to match it. The artizans, however betray their want of taste or skill in making the fac simile.

All the south wall was rebuilt except fourteen feet in the middle to the height of twelve feet. The more western window in this wall above described was taken out of its place and removed a few feet further to the north when the wall was remodelled. The more eastern one was put in to match it, but betrays its authenticity (age). The south wall had evidently but one window originally. The more northern window in the south wall of this Church is obviously of the same age with the more southern one in the east gable, and the more eastern window in the south wall is of the same age with the more northern one in the east gable.

=== Westropp 1900 ===
Writing in 1900 the antiquarian Thomas Johnson Westropp described the church as follows:

Parish church, 58 feet 6 inches by 23 feet 8 inches. A very ancient church “cyclopean” masonry. The side walls and south windows probably date from the early eleventh century. The east window has two lights; the southern is of sandstone, with a semicircular head boldly moulded, and of the same period as the south window; its other light is a close copy in limestone. The north door is lintelled, but does not incline. There are two curious corbels in the south wall. Founder, St. Brecan, c. A.D. 500. “Durinierekin,” in 1189; “Dubdery,” in 1302; “Dura,” in O’Brien’s Rental, 1380: “Dubhdoire,” [128] in the Life of St. Brendan MacFinloga.

=== Recent times ===
A website maintained by King's College London recorded in 2015 that the church had changed little since it was described by Westropp, apart from the fact that the arch stone of the west window of the south wall had fallen to the ground to the south of the church. The sculpture was so badly worn that it could not be dated, but the moldings of the windows seemed to date to the 12th century. The south door had been repaired with a concrete gable.

== See also ==
- Carntemple, another ruined church nearby

== Sources ==
- 1842 Ordnance Survey 6-Inch Maps of County Clare, Clare County Library
- O'Donovan, John; Curry, Eugene (1839). "Parish of Doora". Ordnance Survey Letters.
- "St Brecan, Doora", The Corpus of Romanesque Sculpture in Britain and Ireland., King's College London
- Westropp, Thomas Johnson (1894). "Churches with Round Towers in Northern Clare". Journal of the Royal Society of Antiquaries of Ireland. IV.
- Westropp, Thomas Johnson (1900). The Churches of County Clare and the Origin of the Ecclesiastical Divisions in that County. PRIA.
- Westropp, Thomas Johnson (1900b). The Churches of County Clare and the Origin of the Ecclesiastical Divisions in that County. PRIA.
- Westropp, Thomas Johnson (1901). "Augustinian Houses of the County Clare, etc". Journal of the Royal Society of Antiquaries of Ireland. Archived from the original on 3 March 2016.
- Westropp, Thomas Johnson (1913). "Early Christian Period". County Clare Folk-Tales and Myths.
