= Doora, County Clare =

Village in County Clare, Ireland

Doora Dúire
- Civil parish
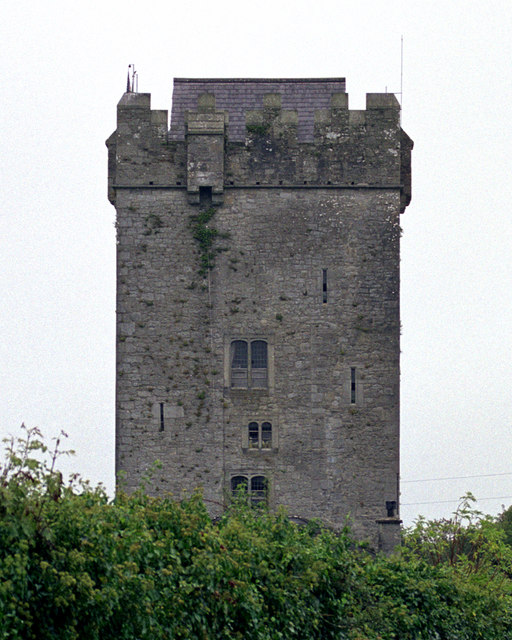
- Castlefergus or Ballyhannon Castle

- Location within Ireland
- Coordinates: 52°49′56″N 8°55′09″W
- Country: Ireland
- Province: Munster
- County: County Clare
- Time zone: UTC+0 (WET)
  - Summer (DST): UTC-1 (IST (WEST))

Doora (Irish: Dúire) is a village and civil parish in County Clare, Ireland, just to the east of the town of Ennis.

== Name ==
In Irish the word Dúr means "water", and Dúire means "of water", so the name means the parish of the water or bog.

== Location ==
The parish is on the western border of the barony of Bunratty Upper, just east of the town of Ennis. It is 3.75 by 3 miles (6.04 by 4.83 km) and covers 5,927 acres (2,399 ha). The land includes bog, upland pasture and farmland. It is drained by the River Quin, which runs southwest into the River Fergus. The population in 1841 was 2,365 in 370 houses. While the original eponymous hamlet decayed, a new village developed around Doora Church.

== Antiquities ==
The history of Saint Brecan of Arran says he founded a church in Daclais that is named after him. According to James Frost the townland of Kilbreckan holds the ruined church of Carrantemple, a very old building, which may be this church. In fact Carntemple lies in the adjacent townland of Noughaval. Doora Church may have been founded by Saint Brecan around 500 AD. If Brecan was the founder, as tradition states, it would have been one of the first central mission churches in Clare. An 1842 map notes that the church was in ruins and shows it about 200 metres (660 ft) southwest of what was then the hamlet of Doora, in the west of the townland of Ballaghboy. It was about 300 metres (980 ft) east of the River Fergus, opposite the town of Ennis. There is also a ruined church named Kellavella. Two holy wells in the parish are dedicated to Saint Breccan.

The parish has the remains of two castles. Ballyhannon Castle was the property of William Neylan in 1580. Renamed Castlefergus, it was still well preserved in 1893. The castle has since been restored and may be rented. The other castle, Clonmore, was completely ruined by the end of the 19th century. As of 1845 the principal hamlets were Dowry and Ballaghboy. The parish name at that time was variously spelled Doora, Dowry, or Dowrie.

A notable native of the parish was Michael Considine of Castletown townland, who composed the famous folk song Spancil Hill in the early 1870s.

== Sports ==
The Gaelic Athletic Association (GAA) club, St Josephs Doora-Barefield GAA, has its grounds in the parish with three playing pitches in the Gurteen townland (52.842086°N 8.906281°W).

== Catholic parish ==
In 1837 the parish was united in the Catholic church with the parish of Kilraghtis. Doora today is in the Catholic parish of Doora-Barefield, also called Doora and Kilraghtis, in the Roman Catholic Diocese of Killaloe.

== Townlands ==
The parish contains the townlands of Ardsollus, Ballaghboy, Ballyglass, Ballyortla (North), Ballyortla (South), Ballyvonnavaun, Bunnow, Castlefergus, Castletown, Cloonawee, Cloonmore, Corebeg, Creggaun, Deerpark, Dooneen, Drim, Drumdoolaghty, Finanagh, Gaurus, Gortataggart, Gorteen, Kilbreckan, Kilfeilim, Killawinna, Knockanean, Knockaskibbole, Knockhogan, Monanoe, Moyriesk and Noughaval.

The townlands of Castlefergus and Ardsollus are isolated from the rest of the parish, a small distance to the south. The town of Ennis includes the townlands of Ballaghboy, Bunnow, Gaurus, and Knockanean.

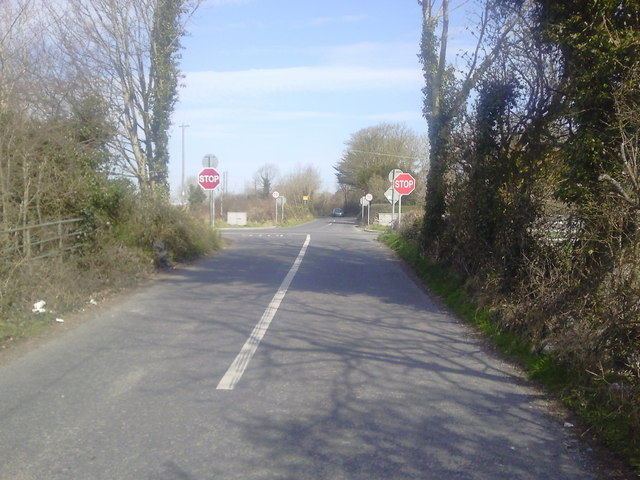
Junction of country road with R469, Ennis

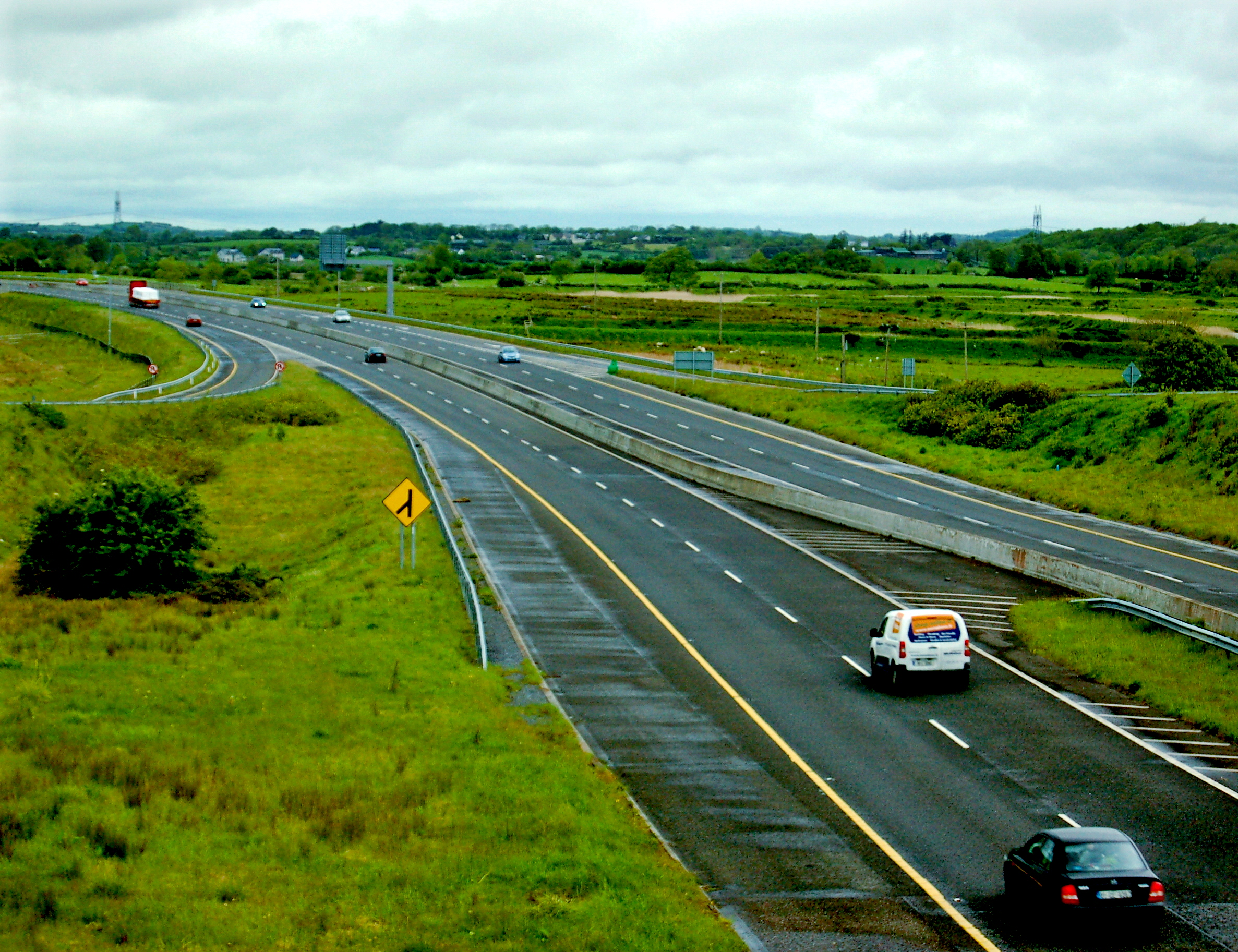
Junction of N85 with M18 - View of the M18 to North from the N85

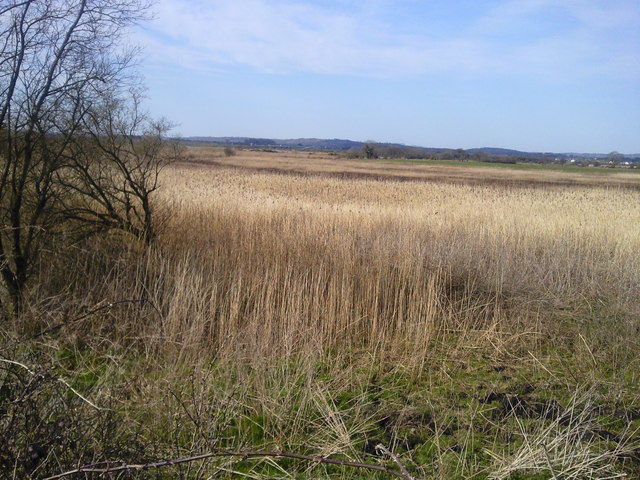
Reedbed in the townland of Kilbreckan

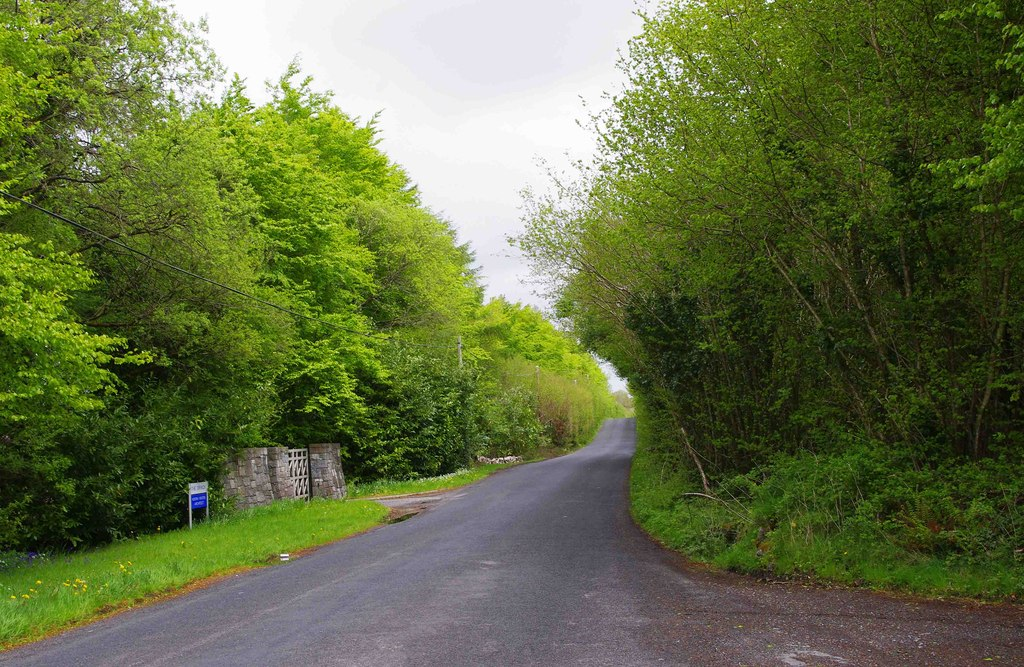
L4104 road near Finanagh

== Sources ==
- 1842 Ordnance Survey 6-Inch Maps of County Clare, Clare County Library
- "About Us". St Joseph’s Doora Barefield.
- "Ballyhannon Castle". Ballyhannon Castle.
- "Doora and Kilraghtis". Diocese of Killaloe.
- "Dúire". Placenames Database of Ireland.
- "Ennis (Inis)". Clare County Library.
- Frost, James (1893). The History and Topography of the County of Clare: From the Earliest Times to the Beginning of the 18th Century. author. p. 49.
- Lewis, Samuel (1837). County Clare, A History and Topography. Ennis: CLASP Press. ISBN 1-900545-00-4.
- "Map of Doora Parish showing Townlands". Clare County Library.
- "Our Parish". Doora-Barefield parish.
- "Doora, Dowry, or Dowrie". Parliamentary Gazetteer of Ireland. 1845.
- "Schools". Doora-Barefield Parish.
- Westropp, Thomas Johnson (1894). "Churches with Round Towers in Northern Clare". Journal of the Royal Society of Antiquaries of Ireland. IV.
- Westropp, Thomas Johnson (1900). The Churches of County Clare and the Origin of the Ecclesiastical Divisions in that County. PRIA.
