= Clooney, Bunratty Upper =

Clooney Cluaine
- Civil parish
- Location in Ireland
- Coordinates: 52°53′58″N 8°51′42″W
- Country: Ireland
- Province: Munster
- County: County Clare
- Time zone: UTC+0 (WET)
  - Summer (DST): UTC-1 (IST (WEST))

Clooney (Irish: Cluaine) is a civil parish of County Clare, Ireland, located to the northeast of Ennis, south of Inchicronan. The area is marshy, with the Oysterman's Marsh Natural Heritage Area in the vicinity. Clooney-Quin GAA is a GAA club for the Catholic parish of Clooney and Quin.

== Geography ==
The civil parish of Clooney is in the barony of Bunratty Upper. It is situated in the central part of the county and is bordered by Inchicronan to the north, Tulla to the east, Quin to the south, Doora to the southwest, and Kilraghtis to the west. It is divided into 25 townlands:

- Ballycrighan
- Ballyhickey
- Ballyvergin
- Ballyvroghaun Eighter
- Ballyvroghaun Oughter
- Caherloghan
- Cahershaughnessy
- Carrahan
- Clooney
- Corbally
- Cranagher
- Curraghmoghaun
- Derrycalliff
- Feenagh
- Kilgobban
- Knockanoura
- Knockaphreaghaun
- Lassana
- Maghera
- Moyriesk
- Muckinish
- Rathclooney
- Rylane
- Sraheen
- Toonagh

== See also ==
- List of townlands of County Clare
