= Doora, Mysore =

Doora
- Village
- Location within India Location within Karnataka
- Coordinates: 12.146102°N 76.595632°E
- Country: India
- State: Karnataka
- District: Mysore
- Taluka: Mysore

Population (2011)
  - Total: 4,273
- Time zone: UTC+5:30 (IST)
- PIN: 570008
- STD code: 0821

Doora is a village in the Mysore Taluka of Mysore district, Karnataka state, India with a total population of 4,273 as of 2011.

== Location ==
Doora has the census location code of 618778. The village is in the Mysore Tehsil of Mysore district, Karnataka. It is a 17 kilometres (11 mi) drive from Mysore city. The village is administered by an elected Sarpanch, or village head, who represents the village.

== Demographics ==
As of the 2011 census, there were 914 families in the village. The total population was 4,273, or which 2,183 were male and 2,090 female. There were 499 children aged up to six years old, or 11.68%. The average sex ratio was 957, lower than the state average of 973. The child sex ratio was 1028, higher than the state average of 948.

Literacy was 65.13% compared to 75.36% in Karnataka as a whole. 70.99% of males were literate and 58.95% of females. 31.71% of the population were of Scheduled Castes and 1.03% were of Scheduled Tribes. 1,790 of the population worked, of whom 1,641 worked full-time and the others worked for less than six months per year. 758 owned or co-owned farmland and 195 were agricultural laborers.

== Facilities ==
The village has a Primary Health Care (PHC) center.
