= Crusheen (parish) =

Roman Catholic parish in County Clare, Ireland

- Roman Catholic parish
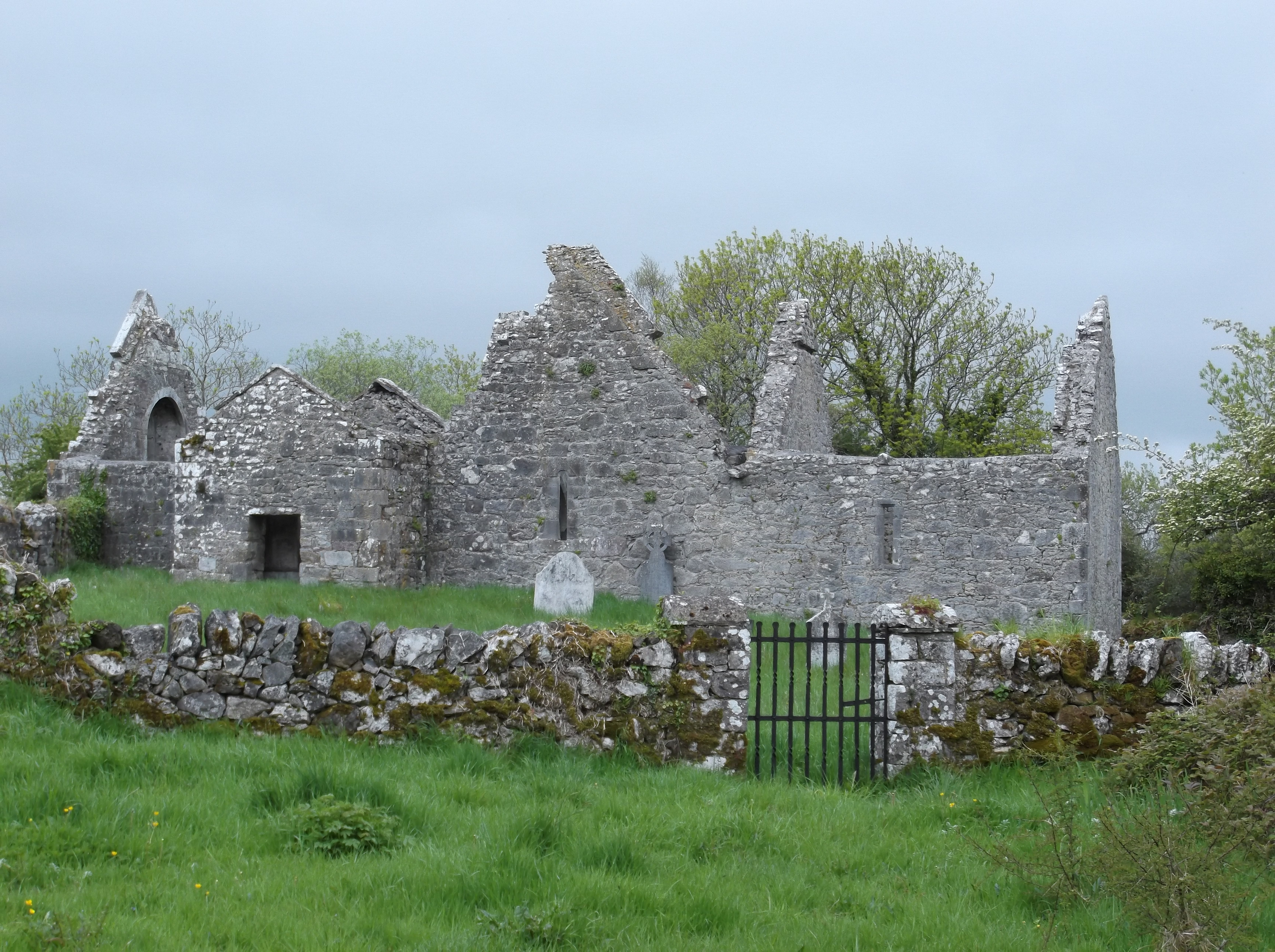
- Remains of Inchicronan Priory

- Location in Ireland
- Coordinates: 52°59′24″N 8°53′39″W
- Country: Ireland
- Province: Munster
- County: County Clare
- Time zone: UTC+0 (WET)
  - Summer (DST): UTC-1 (IST (WEST))

Crusheen, formerly Inchicronan, is a parish in County Clare, Ireland, and part of the Roman Catholic Diocese of Killaloe.

Current (2021) co-assistant parish priest is Pat O'Neil.

The main church of the parish is the Church of St. Cronan in Crusheen, completed in 1837. The is a cruciform barn church. It replaced an older mass house, built in 1726, which in turn was thoroughly renovated or replaced in 1736.

The second church of the parish is the "Chapel of the Immaculate Conception" in Ballinruan, built in 1824. A renovation and enlargement in 1857 gave the chapel its present form of two aisles at a 90-degree angle.

The parish is also home to Inchicronan Priory.

== Notable priests ==
- Fr. Ger Nash, first parish priest, later diocesan secretary and director of pastoral planning. In 2021 appointed Bishop of Ferns.
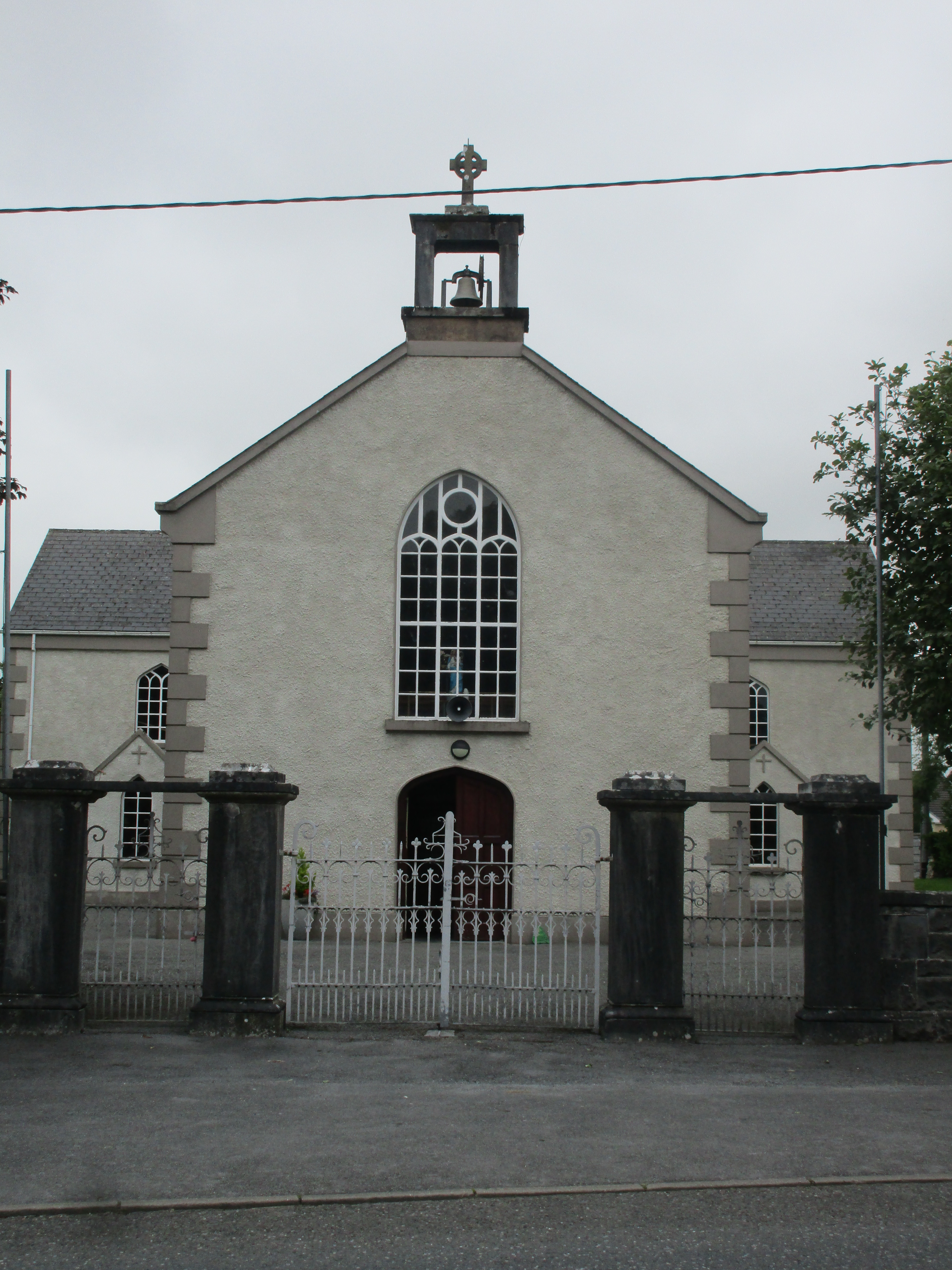
Church of St. Cronan in Crusheen

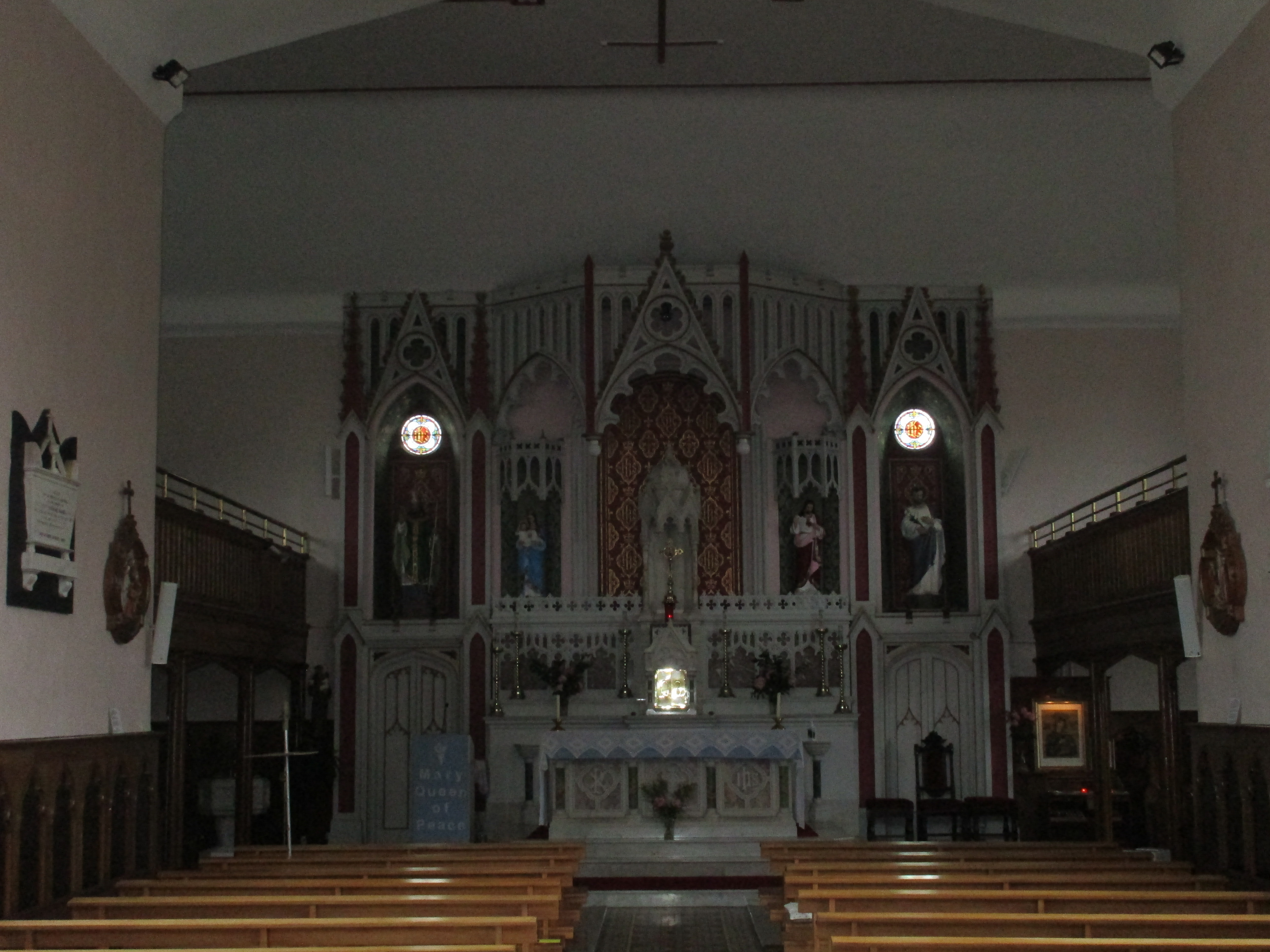
Altar of the Church of St. Cronan

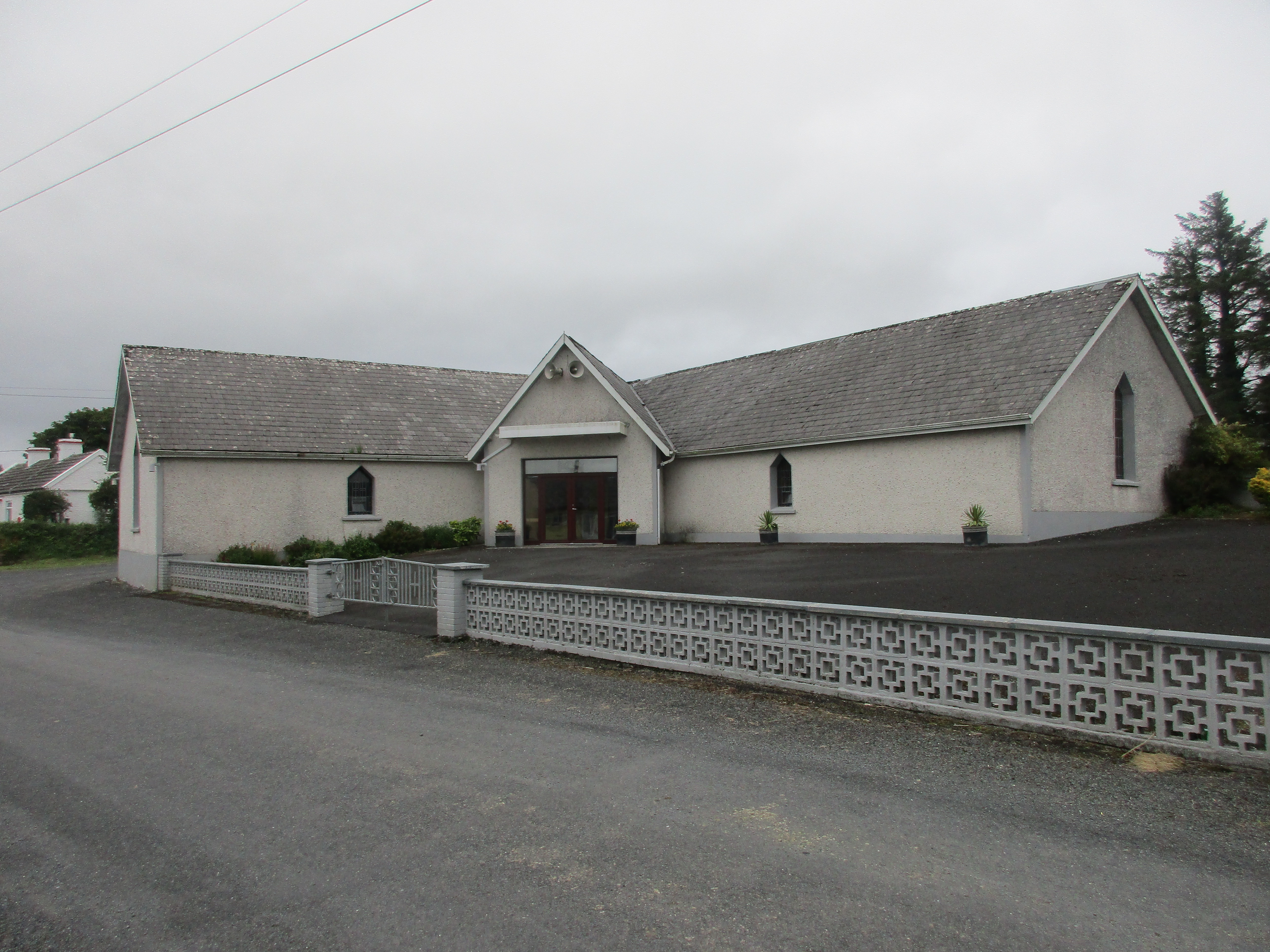
Chapel of the Immaculate Conception in Ballinruan

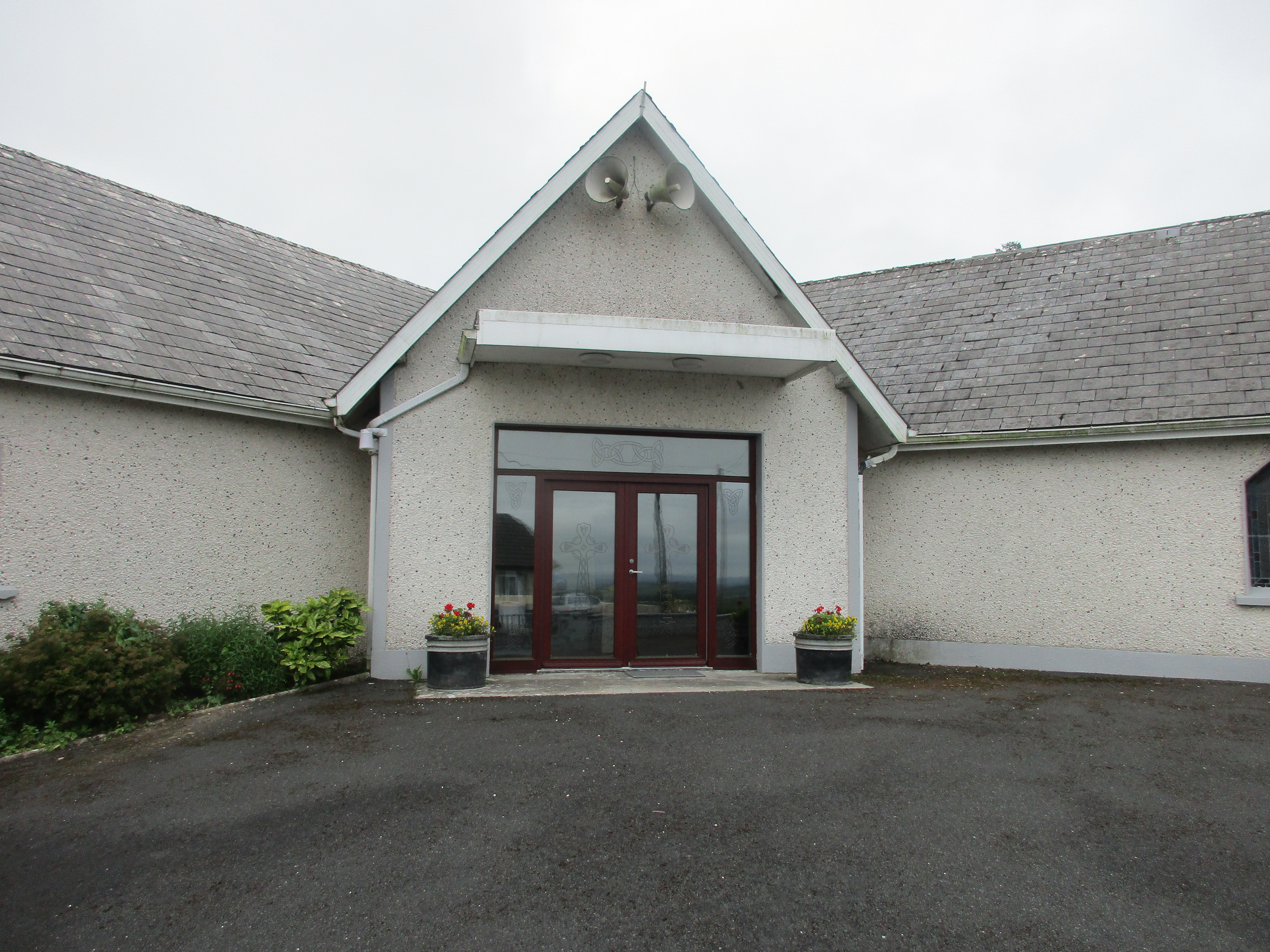
Entry Chapel of the Immaculate Conception in Ballinruan
