= Doora, Agra =

Doora
- Village
- Location in Uttar Pradesh, India Doora (India)
- Coordinates: 27.051080°N 77.737455°E
- Country: India
- State: Uttar Pradesh
- District: Agra
- Tehsil: Kiraoli Tehsil

Population (2011)
  - Total: 7,465
- Time zone: UTC+5:30 (IST)
- PIN: 283110

Doora is a village in the Kiraoli Tehsil of Agra district, Uttar Pradesh, India with a total population of 7,465 as of 2011.

== Location ==
Doora has the census location code of 124774. The village is in the Kiraoli Tehsil of Agra district, Uttar Pradesh. The nearest town is Kiraoli. The village is administered by an elected Sarpanch, or village head, who represents the village.

== Demographics ==
According to the 2011 census there were 1,188 families in the village. The total population was 7,465, or which 3,995 were male and 3,470 female. There were 1,276 children aged up to six years old, or about 17%. The average sex ratio was 869, and the child sex ratio was 800, lower than the state averages of 912 and 902.

Literacy was 71.06% compared to 67.68% in Uttar Pradesh as a whole. 86.28% of males were literate and 53.84 of females. 24.7% of the population were of Scheduled Castes. There were no members of Scheduled Tribes. 2,240 of the population worked, of whom 1,082 worked full-time and the others worked for less than six months per year. 396 owned or co-owned farmland and 188 were agricultural laborers.
