= Bunratty Upper =

Barony in County Clare, Ireland

Bunratty Upper Bun Raite Uachtarach
- Location within Ireland
- Coordinates: 52.819052°N 8.863012°W
- Country: Ireland
- Province: Munster
- County: Clare

Bunratty Upper (Irish: Bun Raite Uachtarach) is a barony in County Clare, Ireland. This ancient geographical division of land is in turn divided into six civil parishes.

== Legal context ==
Baronies were created after the Norman invasion of Ireland as divisions of counties and were used the administration of justice and the raising of revenue. While baronies continue to be officially defined units, they have been administratively obsolete since 1898. However, they continue to be used in land registration and in specification, such as in planning permissions. In many cases, a barony corresponds to an earlier Gaelic túath which had submitted to the Crown.

== Landscape ==
Bunratty Upper is a division of the former barony of Bunratty. This belonged to the Macnamara family, and was called Dangan-i-vigin. It is bounded to the north by the county of Galway. Within the county of Clare, it is bounded by the baronies of Tulla Upper (to the north-east), Tulla Lower (to the east), Bunratty Lower (to the south), Islands (to the south-west) and by Inchiquin (to the north-west). Lough Cullaunyheeda separates the barony from its neighbour, Tulla Lower.

The barony has an area of 53,844 acres (21,790 ha). The land is rocky, but able to support large numbers of sheep.

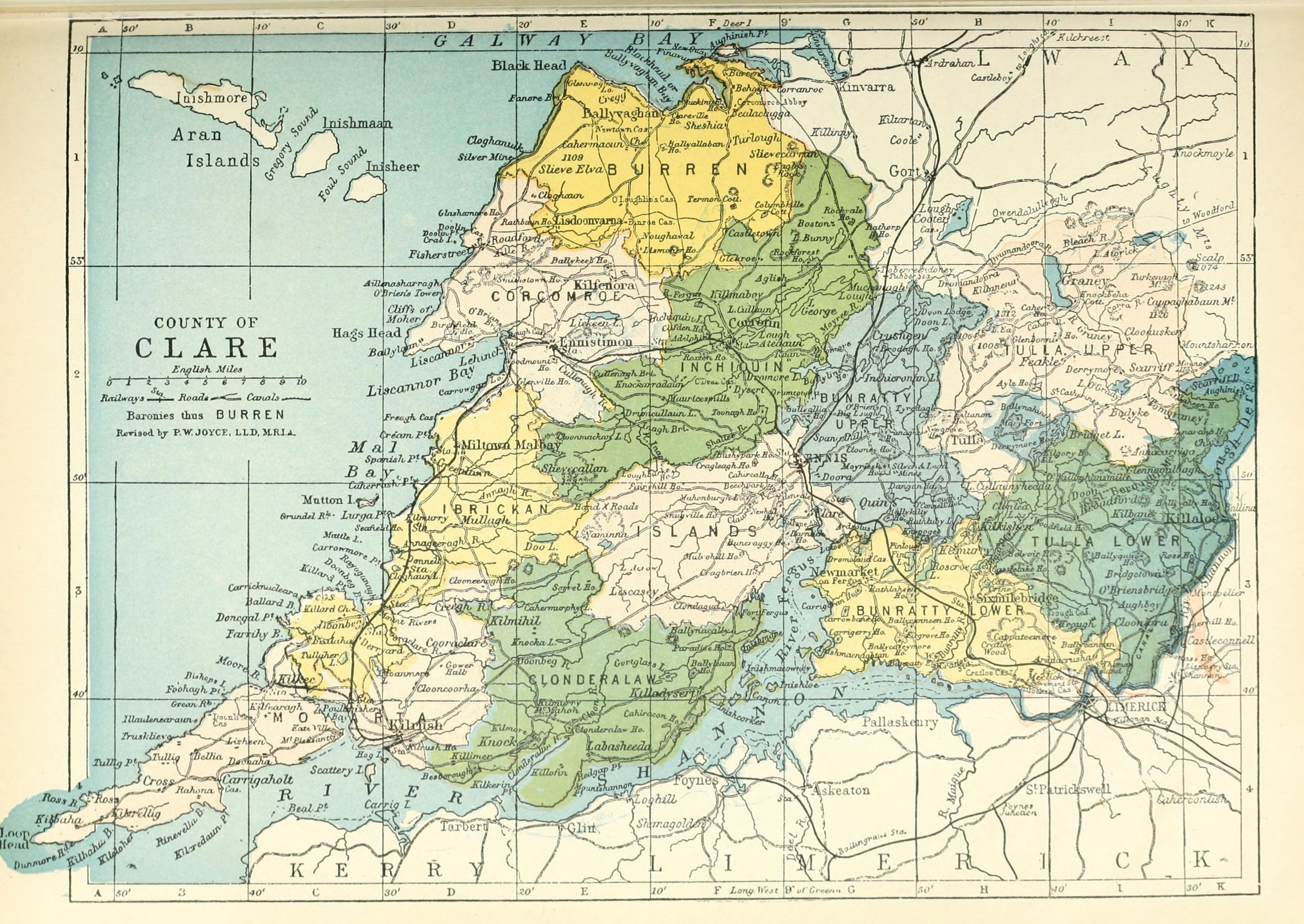
Baronies of Clare. Bunratty Upper, coloured blue, is in the middle.

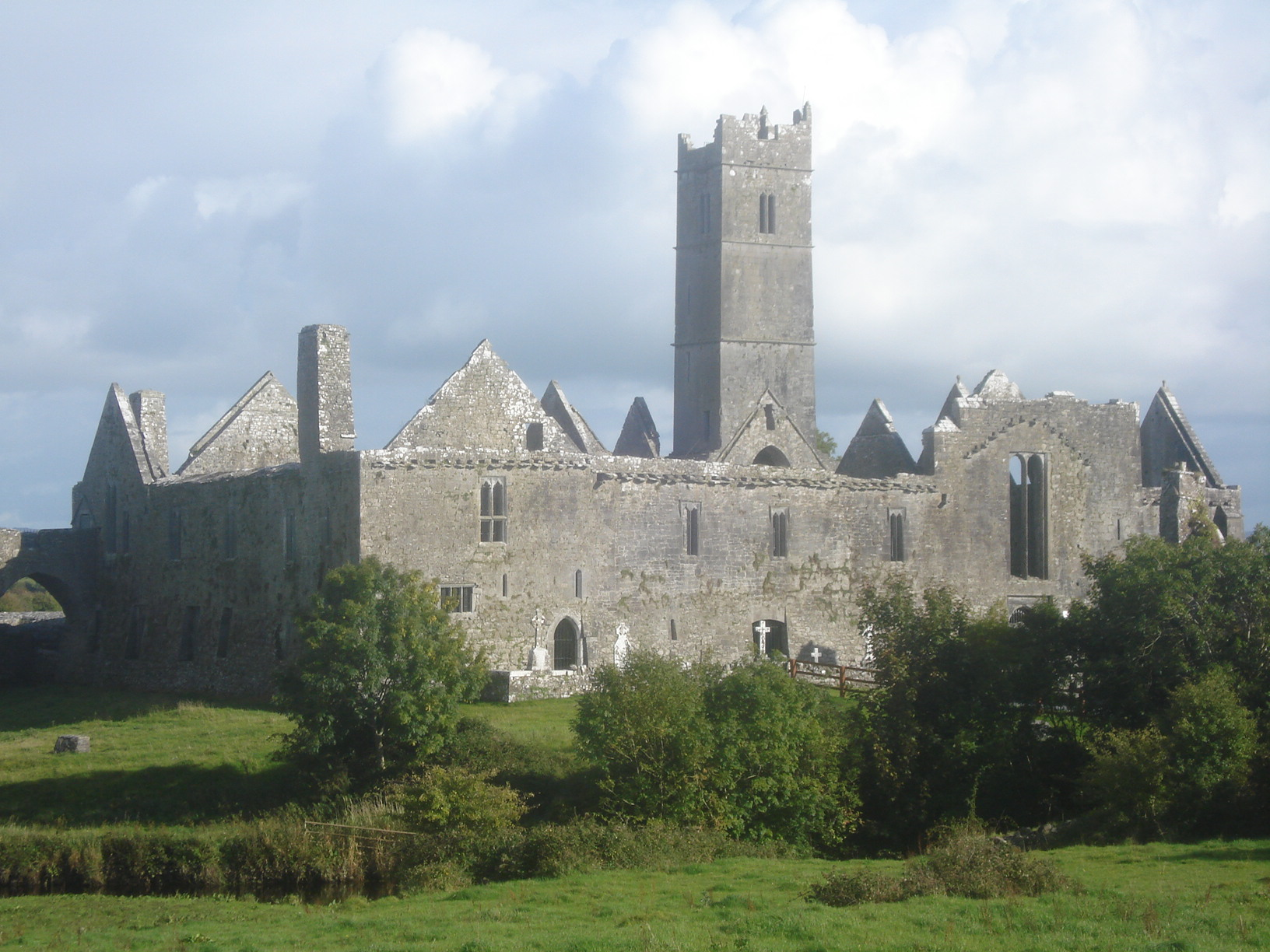
Quin Abbey

== Parishes and settlements ==
Bunratty Upper contains the civil parishes of Clooney, Doora, Inchicronan, Kilraghtis, Quin and Templemaley. The main population centres are Quin and Crusheen. The barony now also includes the eastern and north-eastern edges of Ennis. However, most of Ennis, including its historic centre, is in the Barony of Islands.
