= Kilraghtis =

Civil parish in County Clare, Ireland

Kilraghtis Cill Reachtais
- Civil parish
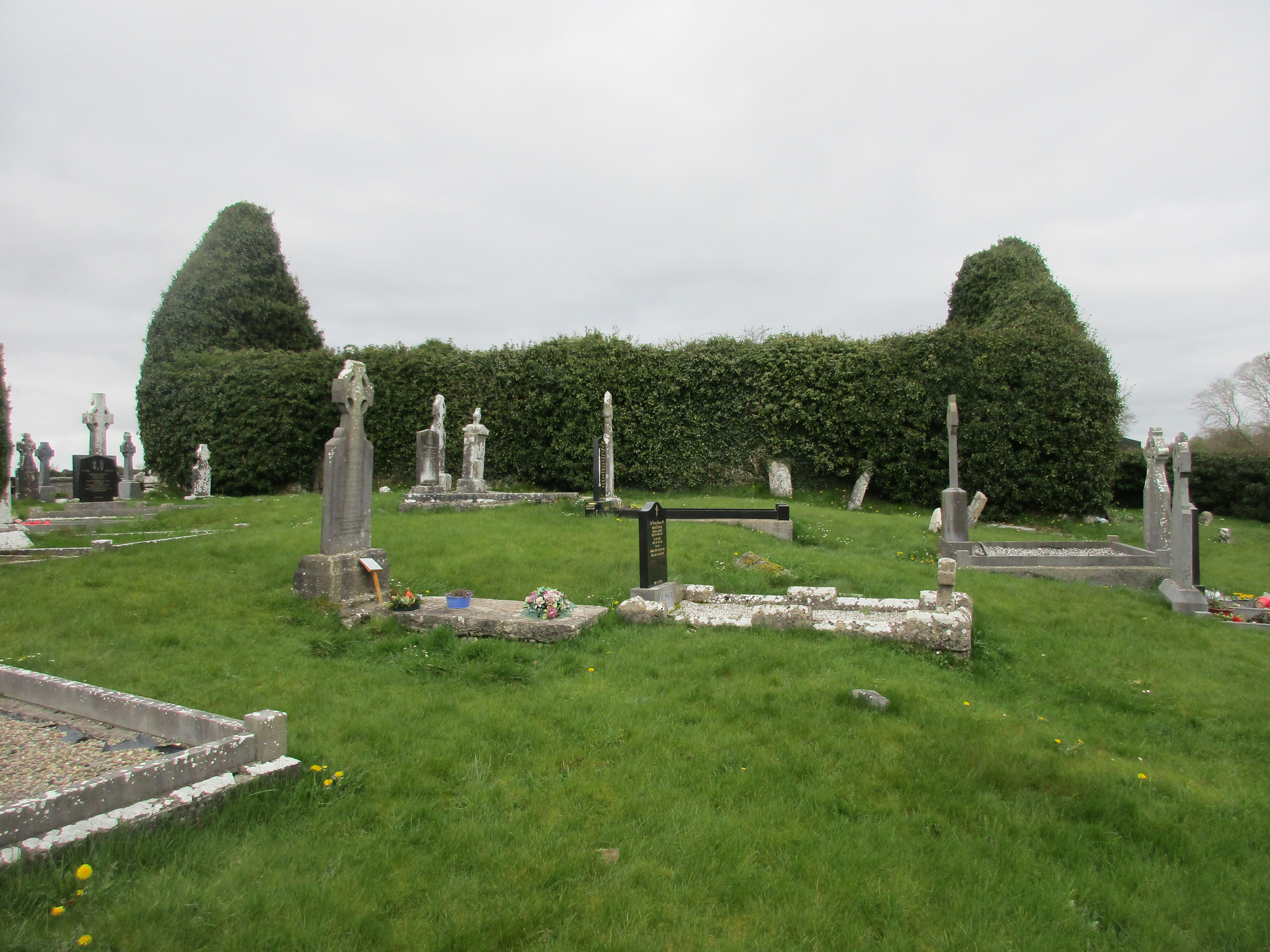
- Kilraghtis Church ruins

- Location in Ireland
- Coordinates: 52°54′10″N 8°55′54″W
- Country: Ireland
- Province: Munster
- County: County Clare
- Time zone: UTC+0 (WET)
  - Summer (DST): UTC-1 (IST (WEST))

Kilraghtis (Irish: Cill Reachtais) is a civil parish in County Clare, Ireland. It covers an area northeast of the town of Ennis, and includes the Ennis suburb of Roslevan.

== Location ==
The parish of Kilraghtis is in the barony of Bunratty Upper. It is 3.5 miles (5.6 km) northeast of Ennis. The parish is 4.75 by 2 miles (7.64 by 3.22 km) and covers 5,587 acres (2,261 ha). In 1841 the population was 1,995 in 297 houses. The man hamlet at that time was Spancel-Hill. The main road from Ennis to Galway runs through the parish.

== History and antiquities ==
There are few antiquities of any interest in the parish. In 1893 the old church was very dilapidated. Nothing is known about the church or its patron. There are no holy wells, and no significant raths or forts.

== Townlands ==
The parish holds the townlands of Ballyduff, Ballyline, Ballymacahil, Ballymaconna, Ballyogan, Bearnafunshin, Cahernalough, Cappagh Beg, Cappagh More, Carrowdotia, Cloonkerry, Cloontymurphy, Cullenagh, Curraderra, Cragard, Drumgloon, Drumquin, Drumgranagh, Knockaluskraun, Racorcraun, Rosslevan, Tooreen, and Tullyvoghan.

The townland of Rosslevan is in the town of Ennis.
