= Thomas Johnson Westropp =

Irish antiquarian, folklorist and archaeologist

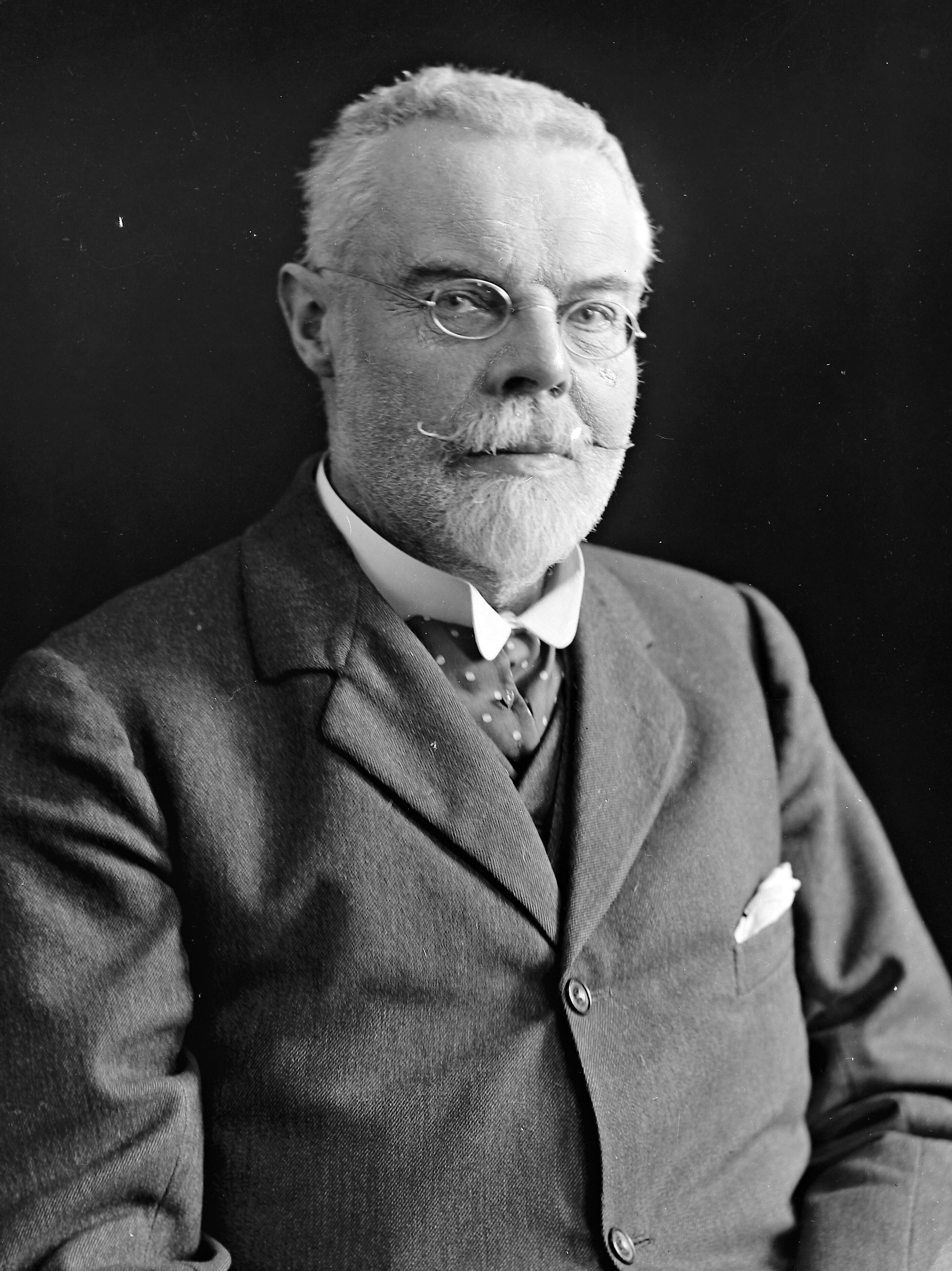
- Westropp in 1920
- Born: August 16, 1860; Attyflin Park, Patrickswell, County Limerick, Ireland
- Died: April 9, 1922 (aged 61)

Thomas Johnson Westropp (16 August 1860 – 9 April 1922) was an Irish antiquarian, folklorist and archaeologist.

== Career ==
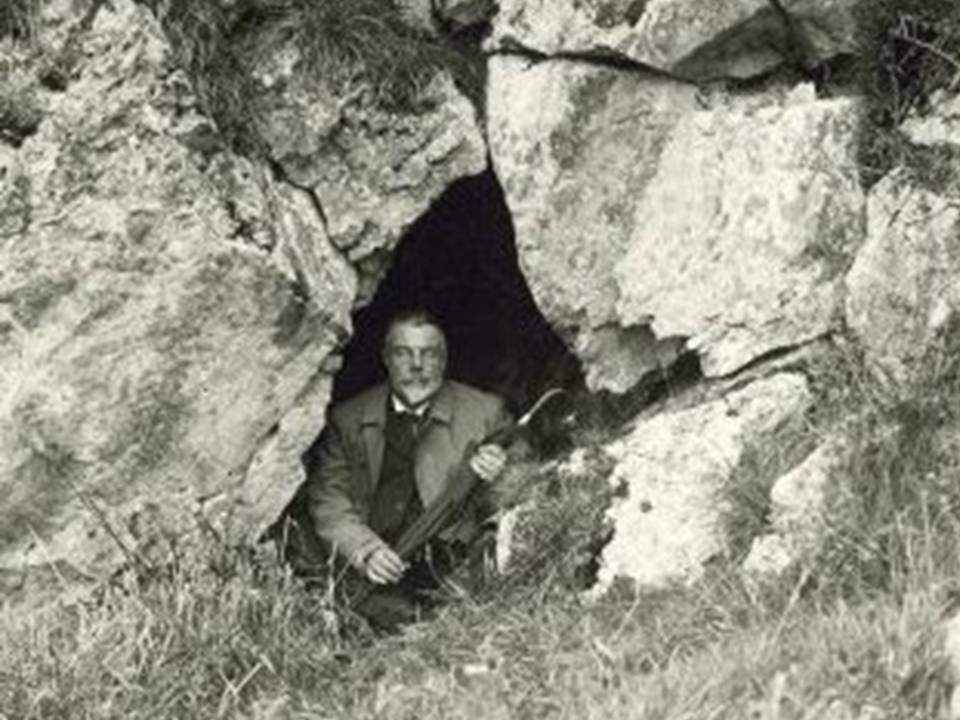
Westropp, posing inside a cave or souterrain

Westropp was born on 16 August 1860 at Attyflin Park, Patrickswell, County Limerick. His relatives were landowners of English origin and had lived there since the mid 16th century. He displayed an early interest in antiquities, making notes on topography, ancient buildings and folk life whenever his family would make trips into the neighbouring counties.

He attended Trinity College Dublin and graduated in 1882 with an MA. A degree in civil engineering followed in 1885, at which time he was apprenticed to Bindon Blood Stoney, who was engaged in a project to widen and dredge the entrance to the Port of Dublin. After he finished his training, Westropp became the assistant surveyor for County Meath, but soon abandoned his professional work to pursue his archaeological interests. He spent the remainder of his life researching antiquities along the western seaboard.

He drew many detailed sketches of buildings, grave slabs and other archaeological remains throughout Ireland. Many of these sketches are held by the Royal Irish Academy. His publications are widely available in libraries throughout the west of Ireland.

== County Clare ==
=== Folklore ===
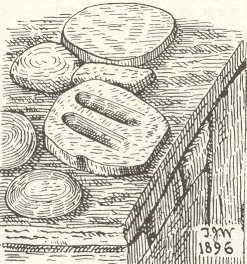
Ancient Irish "charms", sketch by Westropp

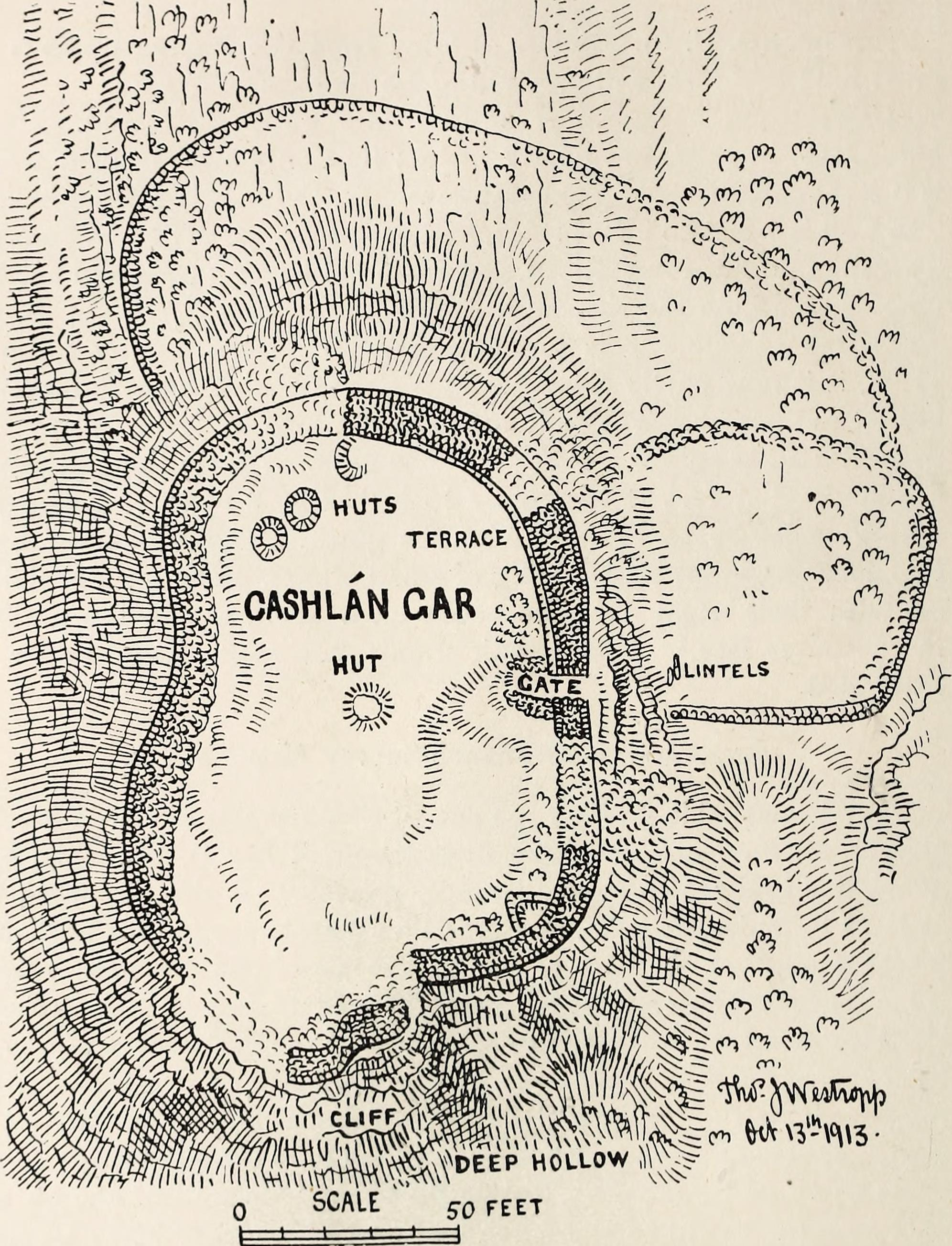
Plan of Cashlaungarr by Westropp (1913)

While surveying the field monuments of County Clare, he became fascinated by the variety and descriptiveness of the folk tales he heard being recited by the locals. Over the course of several years, he gathered these tales, beliefs and customs and published them in a series of articles which appeared in "Folk-Lore: Transactions of the Folk-Lore Society" between 1910 and 1913. In 2006 these folk-tales were published on the internet by the County Clare Library. Many of these tales have since been lost to living memory. His writings later provided the foundation for the work of the Irish Folklore Commission.

=== The Normans and prehistoric sites ===
Westropp also undertook research into the early history of Clare and Limerick (which the Normans called Thomond) and published his finding in three historical essays covering the years 1275–1287, 1287–1313 and 1313–1318, respectively. He then focused on the palaces of early Killaloe, other prehistoric stone-forts and the 'peel towers'or tower houses, eventually publishing several articles about his findings.

== Publications ==
=== County Clare ===
- Westropp, Thomas J. (1900), "The Cahers of County Clare: Their Names, Features, and Bibliography", Proceedings of the Royal Irish Academy, 6 (1900 - 1902): 415–449, JSTOR 20488784
- "Kilkee and its Neighbourhood", Journal of the North Munster Archaeological Society, II, pp. 212-28, 1911–13, Vol. III, pp. 38-52, 108–23, 153–69, 344–61, 1913–1915

Prehistory

- "Prehistoric Remains (Forts and Dolmens) along the Borders of Burren, in the County of Clare", Journal of the Royal Society of Antiquaries of Ireland, 5th
  - Part I. The Eastern Border, vol. 35, 1905, pp. 205–229, JSTOR 25507448
  - Part II. West Cormomroe, vol. 35, 1905, pp. 342–361
  - reprinted as Archaeology of the Burren: Prehistoric Forts and Dolmens in North Clare by T.J. Westropp, CLASP Press, 1999, ISBN 1-900545-10-1
- "Prehistoric Remains (Forts and Dolmens) in the Burren, Co. Clare (Continued)", The Journal of the Royal Society of Antiquaries of Ireland, 6th, 1 (4): 343–367, 1911
- Westropp, Thomas Johnson (1913), "Prehistoric Remains (Forts and Dolmens) in the Corofin District, Co. Clare. (No. XI) (Continued)", The Journal of the Royal Society of Antiquaries of Ireland, 6th, 3 (3): 232–260, JSTOR 25514298
- Westropp, Thomas Johnson (1915), "Prehistoric Remains (Forts and Dolmens) in Burren and Its South Western Border, Co. Clare: Part XII: North Western Part", The Journal of the Royal Society of Antiquaries of Ireland, 6th, 5 (1): 45–62, JSTOR 25514392
- Westropp, Thomas Johnson (1915), "Prehistoric Remains (Forts and Dolmens) in Burren and Its South Western Border, Co. Clare: Part XII: North Western Part (Continued)", The Journal of the Royal Society of Antiquaries of Ireland, 6th, 5 (4): 249–274, JSTOR 25514430
- Westropp, Thomas Johnson (1916), "Notes on Certain Primitive Remains (Forts and Dolmens) in Inagh and Killeimer, Co. Clare: Part XIV (Continued)", The Journal of the Royal Society of Antiquaries of Ireland, 6th, 6 (2): 97–120, JSTOR 25514459
- Westropp, Thomas Johnson (1917), "Notes on the Primitive Remains (Forts and Dolmens) in Central Co Clare Addenda: Part XVI (Continued)", The Journal of the Royal Society of Antiquaries of Ireland, 6th, 7 (1): 1–20, JSTOR 25514479
- Westropp, Thomas Johnson (1917), "Prehistoric Remains in North-Western and Central Co Clare: Part XV. Addenda. West Clare", The Journal of the Royal Society of Antiquaries of Ireland, 6th, 7 (1): 67–74, JSTOR 25514483
- Westropp, Thomas Johnson (1896), "The Distribution of "Cromlechs" in the County of Clare", Proceedings of the Royal Irish Academy, 4 (1896 - 1898): 542–549, JSTOR 20490514
- Westropp, Thomas Johnson (1902), "The Cists, Dolmens, and Pillars in the Eastern Half of the County of Clare", Proceedings of the Royal Irish Academy: Archaeology, Culture, History, Literature, 24 (1902 - 1904): 85–106, JSTOR 25502708
- Westropp, Thomas Johnson (1902), "The Cists, Dolmens, and Pillars in the Eastern Half of the County of Clare", Proceedings of the Royal Irish Academy: Archaeology, Culture, History, Literature, 24 (1902 - 1904): 107–132, JSTOR 25502709
- Westropp, Thomas Johnson (1906), "The Cists, Dolmens, and Pillars of the Western Half of the County of Clare", Proceedings of the Royal Irish Academy: Archaeology, Culture, History, Literature, 26 (1906/1907): 447–472, JSTOR 25502749
- Westropp, Thomas Johnson (1896), "Magh Adhair, Co. Clare. The Place of Inauguration of the Dalcassian Kings", Proceedings of the Royal Irish Academy, 4 (1896 - 1898): 55–60, JSTOR 20490502
- Ring-Forts in the Barony of Moyarta, Co. Clare, and their Legends
  - "Part I. From Loop Head to Carrigaholt", The Journal of the Royal Society of Antiquaries of Ireland, 5th, 38 (4), 1908, JSTOR 25513942
  - "Part II. Kilkee to Carrigaholt", The Journal of the Royal Society of Antiquaries of Ireland, 5th, 39 (2), 1909, JSTOR 25513981
- "Types of the Ring-forts and similar structures remaining in Eastern Clare", Proceedings of the Royal Irish Academy: Archaeology, Culture, History, Literature
  - (The Newmarket Group), vol. 27, 1908, pp. 217–234, JSTOR 25502761
  - (Quin, Tulla, and Bodyke), vol. 27, 1908, pp. 371–400, JSTOR 25502769
  - (Killaloe, Its Royal Forts, and Their History), vol. 29, 191, pp. 186–212, JSTOR 25502797
  - (Conclusion). (Clonlara, Broadford, Cullaun, and Clooney), vol. 32 (1914 - 1916), pp. 58–77, JSTOR 25504165
- Antiquities Near Miltown Malbay in :
  - Journal of the Limerick Field Club, 2 (8): 247–256, 1904
  - Journal of the Limerick Field Club, 3 (9): 1–15, 1905
- Westropp, Thomas Johnson (1893), "Prehistoric Stone Forts of Central Clare: Moghane and Langough, near Dromoland", Journal of the Royal Society of Antiquaries of Ireland, 5th, 3 (3): 281–291, JSTOR 25508043

Folklore

- Folklore of Clare : a Folklore Survey of County Clare & County Clare Folk-tales and Myths, Clasp Press, 2000, ISBN 1-90054-512-8
  - reprint of A Folklore Survey of County Clare and County Clare Folk-Tales and Myths, published 1910/1913 in Folk Lore : Transactions of the Folklore Society.

Ecclesiastical

- Westropp, Thomas Johnson (1911), "Cahermurphy Castle and Its Earthworks, with Certain Forts near Milltown-Malbay, County Clare", The Journal of the Royal Society of Antiquaries of Ireland, 6th, 1 (2): 117–137, JSTOR 25514147
- Westropp, Thomas Johnson (1899), "The Augustinian Houses of the County Clare: Clare, Killone, and Inchicronan", Journal of the Royal Society of Antiquaries of Ireland, 5th, 10 (2): 118–135, JSTOR 25507044
- "Churches with Round Towers in Northern Clare", Journal of the Royal Society of Antiquaries of Ireland, 5th, 1894
  - Part I, vol. 4, pp. 25–34, JSTOR 25508096
  - Part II, vol. 4, pp. 150–159, JSTOR 25508126
  - Part III, vol. 4, pp. 332–340, JSTOR 25508174
- "Killaloe: Its Ancient Palaces and Cathedral", Journal of the Royal Society of Antiquaries of Ireland, 5th
  - Part I, vol. 2, 1892, pp. 398–410, JSTOR 25507942
  - Part II, vol. 3, 1893, pp. 187–201, JSTOR 25508022
- Westropp, T. J. (October 1900), "The Churches of County Clare, and the Origin of the Ecclesiastical Divisions in That County", Proceedings of the Royal Irish Academy, 3rd, 6 (1): 100–180, JSTOR 20488773

Fortifications

- Westropp, T. J. (1898), "Notes on the Lesser Castles or 'Peel Towers' of the County of Clare", Proceedings of the Royal Irish Academy, 4th, 5: 348–365, JSTOR 20490552
- "Promontory Forts in the "Irrus," County Clare", The Journal of the Royal Society of Antiquaries of Ireland, 5th
  - Part I. The Kilkee Group, vol. 38, 1908, pp. 28–47, JSTOR 25507654
  - Part II. Loop Head and Cross Group, vol. 38, pp. 221–231, JSTOR 25513923
- "The Earthworks and Castle of Bunratty, Co. Clare", Journal of the North Munster Archaeological Society, 3 (4): 314–327, 1915

=== Other ===
- "The Ancient Forts of Ireland", The Transactions of the Royal Irish Academy, 31: 579–730, 1896, JSTOR 30079077
  - The Ancient Forts of Ireland, 1902 [reprint]
  - Westropp, Thomas Johnson (1902), ""The Ancient Forts of Ireland." Being Some Further Notes on a Paper of That Name, Especially as to the Age of Motes in Ireland", Proceedings of the Royal Irish Academy: Archaeology, Culture, History, Literature, 24 (1902 - 1904): 267–276, JSTOR 25502716
- Westropp, Thomas Johnson (1921), "The "Mound of the Fiana" at Cromwell Hill, Co. Limerick, and a Note on Temair Luachra", Proceedings of the Royal Irish Academy: Archaeology, Culture, History, Literature, 36 (1921 - 1924): 68–85, JSTOR 25504223
- A study of the fort of Dun Aengusa in Inishmore, Aran Isles, Ireland, 1910
- "Irish Ethnographical Collection", Guide to the collection of Irish antiquities, vol. 5, National Museum of Science and Art, Dublin, 1911
- The Antiquities of Limerick and its Neighborhood, Hodges, Figgis and Co., Limited, 1916
- Westropp, Thomas Johnson (1919), "The Ancient Places of Assembly in the Counties Limerick and Clare", The Journal of the Royal Society of Antiquaries of Ireland, 6th, 9 (1): 1–24, JSTOR 25514522
- Westropp, Thomas Johnson (1912), "The Promontory Forts and Early Remains of the Coasts of County Mayo. Part I. The North Coast (Tirawley and Erris)", The Journal of the Royal Society of Antiquaries of Ireland, 6th, 2 (1): 51–59, JSTOR 25514206
