= 1995 Clare Senior Hurling Championship =

Annual hurling competition season

- Dates: 8 July – 29 October 1995
- Teams: 17
- Sponsor: Auburn Lodge
- Champions: Sixmilebridge (8th title); Ian Mulready (captain); Jim Fawl (manager)
- Runners-up: Scariff; Donal Moloney (captain); Pat Minogue (manager)

Tournament statistics
- Matches played: 16
- Goals scored: 45 (2.81 per match)
- Points scored: 333 (20.81 per match)
- Top scorer(s): Gerry McInerney (3-13)

The 1995 Clare Senior Hurling Championship was the 100th staging of the Clare Senior Hurling Championship since its establishment by the Clare County Board in 1887. The championship draw took place on 27 February 1995. The championship ran from 8 July to 29 October 1995.

Clarecastle entered the championship as the defending champions, however, they were beaten by Cratloe in the quarter-finals. Cratloe joined the championship as Clare IHC winners from the previous year. Tubber and Ruan amalgamated and contested the championship as Tubber/Ruan.

The final was played on 29 October 1995 at Cusack Park in Ennis, between Sixmilebridge and Scariff, in what was their second meeting overall in the final and a first meeting in 43 years. Sixmilebridge won the match by 2–10 to 0–15 to claim their eighth championship title overall and a first title in two years. Sixmilebridge's Gerry McInerney was the championship's top scorer with 3–13.

Sixmilebridge later became the first Clare club to win the All-Ireland Club SHC after beating Dunloy in the 1996 All-Ireland club final.

== Team changes ==
=== To Championship ===
Promoted from the Clare Intermediate Hurling Championship

- Cratloe

== Results ==
=== Preliminary round ===
15 July 1995 Preliminary round	Kilmaley	5-12 - 0-08	Corofin	Cusack Park
	A Markham 2-3, B Healy 0-8, J McMahon 2-1, S Fitzpatrick 0-1.

=== First round ===
8 July 1995 First round F	Broadford	0-08 - 2-11	Feakle	Scariff Grounds
	K Ryan 0-7, M O'Brien 0-1.		V Donnellan 0-8.

15 July 1995 First round E	Sixmilebridge	2-08 - 0-06	Newmarket-on-Fergus	Wolfe Tone Park
	Danny Chaplin 2-0, J Chaplin 0-3, A Mulready 0-2, M Conlon 0-1, D McInerney 0-1.		B Enright 0-2, B Cullinan 0-1, M Daly 0-1, K Arthur 0-1.

15 July 1995 First round G	O'Callaghan's Mills	1-14 - 1-07	Whitegate	Broadford Grounds
	PJ O'Connell 1-4, B McNamara 0-7, K McNamara 0-2, D Cooney 0-1.		P Doyle 0-6, P Minogue 1-0, G Malone 0-1.

9 September 1995 First round	Tulla	1-14 - 0-03	Wolfe Tones	Fr Murphy Memorial Park
	J McInerney 1-4, S Littleton 0-4, M Littleton 0-2, D McInerney 0-2, M Corry 0-1, R McInerney 0-1.		D Collins 0-2, P O'Rourke 0-1.

9 September 1995 First round	Cratloe	4-11 - 3-11	Inagh-Kilnamona	Fr Murphy Memorial Park
	J O'Gorman 2-0, S Ryan 0-6, D Ryan 1-0, K Galvin 1-0, R O'Hara 0-2, C Galvin 0-1, N McMahon 0-1, E Wall 0-1.		P McInerney 2-1, D Woods 1-0, F Hegarty 0-3, S Barry 0-3, E Garvey 0-2, B Hegarty 0-1, B Fitzgerald 0-1.

10 September 1995 First round	Tubber/Ruan	1-12 - 1-10	Éire Óg	Cusack Park
	M Daffy 0-4, E Taaffe 1-0, T Donoghue 0-3, P Taaffe 0-3, C Lyons 0-1, E Scanlan 0-1.		G Logue 1-2, M Nugent 0-1, C Shannon 0-1, S McCarthy 0-1, F Flynn 0-1.

10 September 1995 First round	Clarecastle	0-09 - 0-08	St Joseph's Doora-Barefield	Cusack Park
	J Healy 0-7, K Power 0-1, A Neville 0-1.		J O'Connor 0-3, G Baker 0-2, P Collins 0-2, L Hassett 0-1.

10 September 1995 First round	Scariff	2-11 - 0-12	Kilmaley	O'Garney Park
	D Murphy 1-2, B Murphy 1-2, M McKenna 0-5, K Minogue 0-2.		B Healy 0-5, T Kennedy 0-3, S Fitzpatrick 0-2, E Kennedy 0-1, N Romer 0-1.

=== Quarter-finals ===
16 September 1995 Quarter-final	Cratloe	0-13 - 0-11	Clarecastle	Fr Murphy Memorial Park
	S Ryan 0-8, M Deegan 0-3, M O'Gorman 0-1, R O'Hara 0-1.		J Healy 0-4, A Neville 0-2, R Fitzgerald 0-2, P Healy 0-1, G O'Loughlin 0-1, F Tuohy 0-1.

16 September 1995 Quarter-final	Tulla	4-09 - 3-13	Sixmilebridge	Fr Murphy Memorial Park
	J McInerney 3-0, S Littleon 0-6, M Corry 1-0, B Quinn 0-2, F Culloo 0-1.		G McInerney 2-3, D McInerney 1-2, J Chaplin 0-2, P Hayes 0-1, C Chaplin 0-1, A White 0-1, F Quilligan 0-1, David Chaplin 0-1, Danny Chaplin 0-1.

17 September 1995 Quarter-final	Tubber/Ruan	1-11 - 1-12	Scariff	Cusack Park
	M Daffy 0-6, C Lyons 1-2, E Taaffe 0-1, M Clancy 0-1, P Taaffe 0-1.		M McKenna 1-2, B Murphy 0-5, D Murphy 0-2, P Minogue 0-2, T McMahon 0-1.

17 September 1995 Quarter-final	O'Callaghan's Mills	5-08 - 2-11	Feakle	Whitegate Grounds
	B McNamara 1-4, D Cooney 2-0, B Madden 1-1, PJ O'Connell 1-0, D Moroney 0-1, T Canny 0-1, B Noonan 0-1.		V Donnellan 0-5, T Guilfoyle 1-1, M O'Grady 1-0, M Guilfoyle 0-3, J Punch 0-1, B McMahon 0-1.

=== Semi-finals ===
8 October 1995 Semi-final	Sixmilebridge	1-23 - 0-04	Cratloe	Cusack Park
	G McInerney 0-7, D McInerney 1-1, J Chaplin 0-4, M Conlon 0-4, A Mulready 0-2, N Earley 0-2, Danny Chaplin 0-1, David Chaplin 0-1, F Quilligan 0-1.		S Ryan 0-1, K Galvin 0-1, D Ryan 0-1, N McMahon 0-1.

8 October 1995 Semi-final	Scariff	2-09 - 1-09	O'Callaghan's Mills	Cusack Park
	M McKenna 0-5, M Minogue 1-1, T McMahon 1-0, P Minogue 1-0, B Murphy 0-2, D Murphy 0-1.		B McNamara 0-5, F Marsh 1-1, B Madden 0-1, T Canny 0-1, M Deasy 0-1.

=== Final ===
29 October 1995 Final	Sixmilebridge	2-10 - 0-15	Scariff	Cusack Park
	G McInerney 1-3, David Chaplin 1-0, M Conlon 0-2, A Mulready 0-2, D McInerney 0-1, N Earley 0-1, J Chaplin 0-1.		M McKenna 0-6, B Murphy 0-5, M Minogue 0-1, B McNamara 0-1, D Kelly 0-1, T McMahon 0-1.	Referee: T O'Sullivan (Wolfe Tones)

== Championship statistics ==
=== Top scorers ===
Overall

Rank	Player	Club	Tally	Total	Matches	Average
1	Gerry McInerney	Sixmilebridge	3-13	22	4	5.50
2	Mark McKenna	Scariff	1-18	21	4	5.25
3	Brendan McNamara	O'Callaghan's Mills	1-16	19	3	6.33
4	Barry Murphy	Scariff	1-14	17	4	4.25
5	Jim McInerney	Tulla	4-04	16	2	8.00
6	Seán Ryan	Cratloe	0-15	15	3	5.00
7	Val Donnellan	Feakle	0-13	13	2	6.50
8	Declan McInerney	Sixmilebridge	2-05	11	4	2.75
8	James Healy	Clarecastle	0-11	11	2	5.50
10	P. J. O'Connell	O'Callaghan's Mills	2-04	10	2	5.00
10	Mike Daffy	Tubber/Ruan	0-10	10	2	5.00
10	John Chaplin	Sixmilebridge	0-10	10	4	2.50

In a single game

Rank	Player	Club	Tally	Total	Opposition
1	Jim McInerney	Tulla	3-00	9	Sixmilebridge
1	Gerry McInerney	Sixmilebridge	2-03	9	Tulla
1	Alan Markham	Kilmaley	2-03	9	Corofin
4	Val Donnellan	Feakle	0-08	8	Broadford
4	Seán Ryan	Cratloe	0-08	8	Clarecastle
6	Paul McInerney	Inagh-Kilnamona	2-01	7	Cratloe
6	P. J. O'Connell	O'Callaghan's Mills	1-04	7	Whitegate
6	Brendan McNamara	O'Callaghan's Mills	1-04	7	Feakle
6	Jim McInerney	Tulla	1-04	7	Wollfe Tones
6	Gerry McInerney	Sixmilebridge	0-07	7	Cratloe
6	Brendan McNamara	O'Callaghan's Mills	0-07	7	Whitegate
6	James Healy	Clarecastle	0-07	7	St Joseph's Doora-Barefield
6	Kevin Ryan	Broadford	0-07	7	Feakle

=== Miscellaneous ===
- Sixmilebridge's Flan Quilligan became the first player from the club to win eight Clare SHC titles.
