= 1961 Clare Senior Hurling Championship =

Annual hurling competition season

- Champions: Whitegate (2nd title)
- Runners-up: Newmarket-on-Fergus

The 1961 Clare Senior Hurling Championship was the 66th staging of the Clare Senior Hurling Championship since its establishment by the Clare County Board in 1887.

Ruan entered the championship as the defending champions.

The final was played on 3 September 1961 at Cusack Park in Ennis, between Whitegate and Newmarket-on-Fergus, in what was their first ever meeting in the final. Whitegate won the match by 5–07 to 3–09 to claim their second championship title overall and a first championship title in 11 years.

== Results ==
=== Final ===
3 September 1961 Final	Whitegate	5-07 - 3-09	Newmarket-on-Fergus	Cusack Park
