= 1963 Clare Senior Hurling Championship =

Annual hurling competition season

- Champions: Newmarket-on-Fergus (10th title); Ger Buddy McMahon (captain)
- Runners-up: Whitegate

The 1963 Clare Senior Hurling Championship was the 68th staging of the Clare Senior Hurling Championship since its establishment by the Clare County Board in 1887.

Ruan entered the championship as the defending champions.

The final was played on 25 August 1963 at Cusack Park in Ennis, between Newmarket-on-Fergus and Whitegate, in what was their second meeting in the final overall. Newmarket-on-Fergus won the match by 6–10 to 3–07 to claim their 10th championship title overall and a first championship title in eight years.

== Results ==
=== Final ===
25 August 1963 Final	Newmarket-on-Fergus	6-10 - 3-07	Whitegate	Cusack Park
