= 1998 Clare Senior Hurling Championship =

Annual hurling competition season

- Dates: 19 September – 15 November 1998
- Teams: 13
- Sponsor: Auburn Lodge
- Champions: St Joseph's Doora-Barefield (3rd title); Lorcan Hassett (captain); Michael Clohessy (manager)
- Runners-up: Kilmaley; John McMahon (captain); P. J. Kennedy (manager)

Tournament statistics
- Matches played: 13
- Goals scored: 23 (1.77 per match)
- Points scored: 256 (19.69 per match)
- Top scorer(s): Mark McKenna (0-21)

The 1998 Clare Senior Hurling Championship was the 103rd staging of the Clare Senior Hurling Championship since its establishment by the Clare County Board in 1887. The championship draw was made on 19 May 1998. The championship ran from 19 September to 15 November 1998.

Clarecastle entered the championship as the defending champions, however, they were beaten by Éire Óg in the first round.

The final was played on 15 November 1998 at Cusack Park in Ennis, between St Joseph's Doora-Barefield and Kilmaley, in what was their first ever meeting in the final. St Joseph's Doora-Barefield won the match by 3–09 to 2–07 to claim their third championship title overall and a first title in 40 years. Scariff's Mark McKenna was the championship's top scorer with 0-21.

St Joseph's Doora-Barefield later became the second Clare club to win the All-Ireland Club SHC after beating Rathnure in the 1999 All-Ireland club final.

== Format change ==
The championship underwent a format change with the introduction of the Clare Senior B Hurling Championship. Nineteen teams were classified as senior, however, eight of these contested the B grade championship. This championship was divided into two groups of four with each team playing the other three in the group. The top team from each group qualified for the quarter-finals of the championship proper.

== Results ==
=== First round ===
19 September 1998 First round	O'Callaghan's Mills	1-10 - 0-05	Tulla	O'Garney Park
	A Duggan 0-5, B Noonan 1-1, K McNamara 0-2, B Frost 0-1, E McNamara 0-1.		J Leamy 0-2, J McInerney 0-2, M Murphy 0-1.

19 September 1998 First round	Cratloe	0-04 - 0-10	Wolfe Tones na Sionna	O'Garney Park
	D Considine 0-3, R O'Hara 0-1.		Paul O'Rourke 0-5, D O'Rourke 0-2, G McPhillips 0-2, P Keary 0-1.

20 September 1998 First round	Clonlara Gaels	2-06 - 2-24	Scariff	Killaloe Grounds
	A Markham 1-2, W Kennedy 1-0, G McCormack 0-2, J Callinan 0-1, D Pierce 0-1.		M McKenna 0-11, A Rodgers 1-2, D Murphy 1-2, B Murphy 0-3, P Moroney 0-2, B McNamara 0-1, D Kelly 0-1, P Minogue 0-1, G Crotty 0-1.

20 September 1998 First round	St Joseph's Doora-Barefield	0-17 - 2-09	Sixmilebridge	Cusack Park
	S McMahon 0-4, J O'Connor 0-4, L Hassett 0-3, A Whelan 0-3, O Baker 0-2, K O'Neill 0-1.		M Conlon 0-5, S Fitzpatrick 1-0, N Gilligan 1-0, David Chaplin 0-2, J Reddan 0-1, Danny Chaplin 0-1.

11 October 1998 First round	Éire Óg	0-12 - 0-12	Clarecastle	Cusack Park
	F Flynn 0-4, C Lynch 0-3, C Egan 0-2, S McNamara 0-1, C Shannon 0-1, D Tobin 0-1.		K Ralph 0-5, R Fitzgerald 0-4, F Tuohy 0-1, D Scanlan 0-1, J Healy 0-1.

18 October 1998 First round	Éire Óg	1-10 - 0-09	Clarecastle	Cusack Park

- Kilmaley received a bye in this round.

=== Quarter-finals ===
10 October 1998 Quarter-final	O'Callaghan's Mills	0-07 - 2-11	Kilmaley	Cusack Park
	A Duggan 0-4, K McNamara 0-3.		A Markham 1-6, E Kennedy 1-2, B Healy 0-2, T Kennedy 0-1.

10 October 1998 Quarter-final	St Joseph's Doora-Barefield	2-15 - 1-12	Whitegate	Páirc an Dálaigh
	A Whelan 2-1, J O'Connor 0-6, S McMahon 0-5, C O'Neill 0-1, L Hassett 0-1, C Mullen 0-1.		B Minogue 1-5, J O'Brien 0-3, D Solon 0-2, P Minogue 0-1, T Fahy 0-1.

18 October 1998 Quarter-final	Ogonnelloe	0-13 - 2-08 (void)	Wolfe Tones na Sionna	Cusack Park

26 October 1998 Quarter-final	Éire Óg	1-07 - 1-10	Scariff	Hennessy Memorial Park
	C Egan 0-5, F Flynn 1-1, S McNamara 0-1.		M McKenna 0-5, B Murphy 1-1, B McNamara 0-2, A Rodgers 0-2.

1 November 1998 Quarter-final refixture	Ogonnelloe	0-05 - 2-09	Wolfe Tones na Sionna	Cusack Park
	D Forde 0-2, E Sheedy 0-1, N Gavin 0-1, J McKenna 0-1.		G McPhillips 1-2, F Carrig 1-1, Paul O'Rourke 0-3, Pat O'Rourke 0-2, P Keary 0-1.

=== Semi-finals ===
1 November 1998 Semi-final	Kilmaley	0-11 - 1-05	Scariff	Hennessy Memorial Park
	A Markham 0-5, B McMahon 0-2, T Kennedy 0-2, B Healy 0-1, É Kennedy 0-1.		M McKenna 0-5, B Murphy 1-0.

7 November 1998 Semi-final	St Joseph's Doora-Barefield	0-08 - 0-12	Wolfe Tones na Sionna	O'Garney Park
	Pat O'Rourke 0-6, P Keary 0-1, Paul O'Rourke 0-1.		J O'Connor 0-5, O Baker 0-2, L Hassett 0-2, S McMahon 0-1, C O'Neill 0-1, A Whelan 0-1.

=== Final ===
15 November 1998 Final	St Joseph's Doora-Barefield	3-09 - 2-07	Kilmaley	Cusack Park
	A Whelan 2-1, S McMahon 1-3, J O'Connor 0-4, C Mullan 0-1.	Report	E Kennedy 1-1, A Markham 0-4, P Healy 1-0, M Murphy 0-1, T Kennedy 0-1.

== Championship statistics ==
=== Top scorers ===
Overall

Rank	Player	County	Tally	Total	Matches	Average
1	Mark McKenna	Scariff	0-21	21	3	7.00
2	Jamesie O'Connor	St Joseph's Doora-Barefield	0-19	19	4	4.75
3	Andrew Whelan	St Joseph's Doora-Barefield	4-06	18	4	4.50
3	Alan Markham	Kilmaley	1-15	18	3	6.00
5	Seánie McMahon	St Joseph's Doora-Barefield	1-13	16	4	4.00

=== Miscellaneous ===
- A replay of the Ogonnelloe-Wolfe Tones na Sionna quarter-final was ordered after an Ogonnelloe objection to the amount of injury time (nine minutes) was upheld.
