= 2012 Clare Senior Hurling Championship =

Annual hurling competition season

- Champions: Newmarket-on-Fergus (23rd title); Enda Barrett (captain)
- Runners-up: Cratloe; Barry Duggan (captain)

The 2012 Clare Senior Hurling Championship was the 117th staging of the Clare Senior Hurling Championship since its establishment by the Clare County Board in 1887.

Crusheen entered the championship as the defending champions.

The final was played on 28 October 2012 at Cusack Park in Ennis, between Newmarket-on-Fergus and Crusheen, in what was their second meeting in the final overall. Newmarket-on-Fergus won the match by 3–10 to 0–09 to claim a record 23rd championship title overall and a first championship title in 31 years.

== Results ==
=== Final ===
28 October 2012 Final	Newmarket-on-Fergus	3-10 - 0-09	Crusheen	Cusack Park
	C Ryan 1-8 (7f), S O'Brien 2-0, D Barrett 0-2.		C McGrath 0-5 (4f), C McInerney, S Collins, L Markham ('65), D Browne 0-1 each.
