= 2013 Clare Senior Hurling Championship =

Annual hurling competition season

Canon Hamilton Cup 2013
Championship Details
| Dates | May - 10 November 2013 |
| Teams | 20 |
| Sponsor | Pat O’Donnell & Co. |

County Champions
| Winners | Sixmilebridge (11th Title) |

County Runners-up
| Runners-up | Newmarket-on-Fergus |

Changes From 2012
| Promoted | Ruan |
| Relegated | ? |

Changes For 2014
| Promoted | Whitegate |
| Relegated | Smith O'Briens, Killaloe |

Senior B Champions
| Senior B | Ballyea |

The 2013 Clare Senior Hurling Championship was the 118th staging of the Clare Senior Hurling Championship since its establishment in 1887.

Newmarket-on-Fergus are the defending champions.

== Senior Championship Knockout Stages ==
=== Quarter-finals ===
- Top two teams from each Senior A Group plus both Senior B Finalists.

| 19 October 2013 Quarter-Final | Crusheen | 2-14 - 1-20 | Ballyea | Cusack Park, Ennis |
| | | Report |

| 20 October 2013 Quarter-Final | Clonlara | 0-26 - 3-14 (AET) | O'Callaghan's Mills | Cusack Park, Ennis |
| | | Report |

| 20 October 2013 Quarter-Final | Newmarket-on-Fergus | 3-15 - 0-11 | Inagh-Kilnamona | Cusack Park, Ennis |
| | | Report |

| 20 October 2013 Quarter-Final | Sixmilebridge | 4-09 - 0-12 | Tubber | Clarecastle |
| | | Report |

=== Semi-finals ===
| 2 November 2013 Semi-Final | Clonlara | 0-11 - 1-11 | Sixmilebridge | Cusack Park, Ennis |
| | C O’Connell (0-5, frees), C Galvin (0-2), N O’Connell (0-1), J Hastings (0-1), C O’Donovan (0-1), D Honan (0-1). | Report | N Gilligan 0-8 ( three frees, two 65s), A Mulready (1-0), P Fitzgerald (0-1), J Shanahan (0-1), S Morey (0-1). |

| 3 November 2013 Semi-Final | Newmarket-on-Fergus | 0-15 - 1-07 | Ballyea | Clarecastle |
| | C Ryan (0-8, frees), S O’Brien Snr (0-3), R Goode (0-2), E O’Brien (0-1), M O’Hanlon (0-1). | Report | T Kelly (0-5, frees), G Brennan (1-1), J Murphy (0-1). |

== County Final ==
| 10 November 2013 Final | Sixmilebridge | 1-10 - 0-11 | Newmarket-on-Fergus | Cusack Park, Ennis |
| | N. Gilligan 1-6 (1-0 pen, 4fs), J. Shanahan 0-2, S. Morey, S Golden 0-1 each. | Report | C. Ryan 0-6 (5fs), M. O'Hanlon, R. Goode, S. Liddy, S. Kelly, M. McInerney 0-1 each. | Referee: R Hickey |

| Sixmilebridge | Newmarket-on-Fergus |

== Championship statistics ==
=== Miscellaneous ===
- Sixmilebridge win their first title since 2002.
