= 2015 Clare Senior Hurling Championship =

Annual hurling competition season

Canon Hamilton Cup 2015
Championship Details
Dates	29 May - 11 October 2015
Teams	16
Sponsor	Pat O’Donnell & Co.

County Champions
Winners	Sixmilebridge (12th Title)

County Runners-up
Runners-up	Clonlara

Changes From 2014
Promoted	Feakle
Relegated	Broadford; St. Joseph's, Doora-Barefield; Ruan; Scariff; Wolfe Tones, Shannon

Changes For 2016
Promoted	Wolfe Tones, Shannon
Relegated	Tubber

Senior B Champions
Senior B	Inagh-Kilnamona

The 2015 Clare Senior Hurling Championship was the 120th staging of the Clare Senior Hurling Championship since its establishment by the Clare County Board in 1887.

The defending champions and holders of the Canon Hamilton Cup were Cratloe who won their second ever title. This formed part of a historic first Clare Senior Championship 'Double' since Ennis Dalcassians in 1929, which was completed when they defeated Éire Óg, Ennis in the football final the following weekend.

In 2012 it was decided that from 2014 onwards the heretofore separate Clare Senior A and Senior B Hurling Championships would be merged into a single sixteen-team senior hurling championship. This meant that five clubs would lose their senior status and be relegated down to the Clare Intermediate Championship. The fifteen remaining clubs would be joined by the 2013 intermediate champions to form the new single tier format. However, due to the success of the Clare Senior and Under-21 squads in 2013, the culling of the senior hurling championship was postponed for twelve months.

A mini Senior B championship will still be held for those clubs that avoid relegation but don't qualify for the quarter-finals.

== Senior Championship Fixtures/Results ==
=== First round ===
- Eight winners advance to Round 2A (winners)
- Eight losers move to Round 2B (Losers)

29 May 2015 Round 1	Crusheen	3-18 0-15	Inagh-Kilnamona	Cusack Park, Ennis

30 May 2015 Round 1	Ballyea	0-13 0-11	Cratloe	Cusack Park, Ennis

30 May 2015 Round 1	Clarecastle	1-25 - 2-22 (AET)	Clonlara	Shannon

13 June 2015 Round 1 (Replay)	Clarecastle	2-10 2-18	Clonlara	Cusack Park, Ennis

30 May 2015 Round 1	Éire Óg, Ennis	1-10 2-19	Sixmilebridge	Cusack Park, Ennis

30 May 2015	Feakle	1-13 2-13	Newmarket-on-Fergus	O'Garney Park, Sixmilebridge
Round 1

30 May 2015 Round 1	Kilmaley	1-22 - 1-10	Whitegate	O'Garney Park, Sixmilebridge

31 May 2015 Round 1	Clooney-Quin	0-18 - 3-05	Tulla	Cusack Park, Ennis

31 May 2015 Round 1	O'Callaghan's Mills	4-18 - 0-15	Tubber	Cusack Park, Ennis

=== Second round ===
==== A. Winners ====
- Played by eight winners of Round 1
  - Four winners advance to Quarter-finals
  - Four losers move to Round 3

8 August 2015 Round 2A	Clonlara	3-14 - 1-11	O'Callaghan's Mills	O'Garney Park, Sixmilebridge

8 August 2015 Round 2A	Clooney-Quin	1-11 0-13	Newmarket-on-Fergus	Shannon

8 August 2015 Round 2A	Crusheen	1-12 0-17	Sixmilebridge	Clarecastle

9 August 2015 Round 2A	Ballyea	0-21 1-14	Kilmaley	Clarecastle

==== B. Losers ====
- Played by eight losers of Round 1
  - Four winners move to Round 3

8 August 2015 Round 2B	Éire Óg, Ennis	0-16 1-09	Tubber	Clarecastle

9 August 2015 Round 2B	Clarecastle	0-21 - 3-18	Inagh-Kilnamona	O'Garney Park, Sixmilebridge

9 August 2015 Round 2B	Cratloe	1-23 - 1-16	Whitegate	Broadford

9 August 2015 Round 2B	Feakle	0-13 - 1-12	Tulla	Scariff

=== Third round ===
- Played by four losers of Round 2A & four winners of Round 2B
  - Four winners advance to Quarter-finals

22 August 2015 Round 3	Inagh-Kilnamona	1-14 1-20	Kilmaley	Cusack Park, Ennis

23 August 2015 Round 3	Cratloe	3-19 3-14	O'Callaghan's Mills	Cusack Park, Ennis

23 August 2015 Round 3	Crusheen	1-17 0-16	Éire Óg, Ennis	Cusack Park, Ennis

23 August 2015 Round 3	Newmarket-on-Fergus	1-17 0-13	Tulla	Cusack Park, Ennis

=== Quarter-finals ===
- Played by four winners of Round 2A and four winners of Round 3

5 September 2015 Quarter-final	Ballyea	2-17 2-18 (AET)	Kilmaley	Cusack Park, Ennis

5 September 2015 Quarter-final	Clonlara	0-19 0-10	Newmarket-on-Fergus	Cusack Park, Ennis

5 September 2015 Quarter-final	Clooney-Quin	1-12 1-17	Crusheen	Cusack Park, Ennis

6 September 2015 Quarter-final	Cratloe	1-19 1-20	Sixmilebridge	Cusack Park, Ennis

=== Semi-finals ===
19 September 2015 Semi-final	Clonlara	3-11 0-20 (AET)	Kilmaley	Cusack Park, Ennis

27 September 2015 Semi-final (Replay)	Clonlara	2-19 1-10	Kilmaley	Cusack Park, Ennis

20 September 2015 Semi-final	Crusheen	3-13 3-21	Sixmilebridge	Cusack Park, Ennis

== County Final ==
11 October 2015 Final	Clonlara	0-15 1-21	Sixmilebridge	Cusack Park, Ennis

Clonlara	Sixmilebridge
