= 1988 Clare Senior Hurling Championship =

Annual hurling competition season

- Dates: 4 June – 11 September 1988
- Teams: 16
- Champions: Feakle (6th title); Val Donnellan (captain); Tony Hayes (manager)
- Runners-up: Ruan; John Moroney (captain); Michael Moloney (manager)
- Relegated: St Joseph's

The 1988 Clare Senior Hurling Championship was the 93rd staging of the Clare Senior Hurling Championship since its establishment by the Clare County Board in 1887. The championship ran from 4 June to 11 September 1988.

Clarecastle entered the championship as the defending champions, however, they were beaten by Ruan in the semi-finals. Relegation was introduced to the championship for the first time.

The final was played on 11 September 1988 at Cusack Park in Ennis, between Feakle and Ruan, in what was their first ever meeting in the final. Feakle won the match by 1–17 to 1–10 to claim their sixth championship title overall and a first title in 44 years.

== Knockout stage ==
=== Quarter-finals ===
23 July 1988 Quarter-final	Clarecastle	3-15 - 2-10	Crusheen	Cusack Park

7 August 1988 Quarter-final	Feakle	2-12 - 2-02	Scariff	Dr Daly Park

7 August 1988 Quarter-final	Éire Óg	2-12 - 2-11	Sixmilebridge	Dr Daly Park

14 August 1988 Quarter-final	Ruan	3-11 - 0-06	Kilmaley	Cusack Park

=== Semi-finals ===
21 August 1988 Semi-final	Feakle	2-11 - 2-08	Éire Óg	Cusack Park

21 August 1988 Semi-final	Ruan	2-05 - 2-04	Clarecastle	Cusack Park

=== Final ===
11 September 1988 Final	Feakle	1-17 - 1-10	Ruan	Cusack Park
	M Guilfoyle 1-5, V Donnellan 0-7, M Callinan 0-2, T Guilfoyle 0-1, B Slattery 0-1, J Tuohy 0-1.		C Lyons 0-6, PJ Lyons 1-0, M Daffy 0-3, T Kelly 0-1.	Referee: M Quinn (Ennis)
