= 2004 Clare Senior Hurling Championship =

Annual hurling competition season

- Champions: Kilmaley (2nd title); Colin Lynch (captain); John Carmody (manager)
- Runners-up: St Joseph's D/B; Ken Kennedy (captain); Louis Mulqueen (manager)

The 2004 Clare Senior Hurling Championship was the 109th staging of the Clare Senior Hurling Championship since its establishment by the Clare County Board in 1887.

Clarecastle entered the championship as the defending champions, however, they were beaten by St Joseph's Doora-Barefield in the semi-finals.

The final was played on 24 October 2004 at Cusack Park in Ennis, between Kilmaley and St Joseph's Doora-Barefield, in what was their second meeting in the final overall. Kilmaley won the match by 1–10 to 1–09 to claim their second championship title overall and a first title in 19 years.

== Results ==
=== Final ===
| 24 October 2004 Final | Kilmaley | 1-10 - 1-09 | St Joseph's Doora-Barefield | Cusack Park |
| | B Healy 1-2, A Markham 0-4 (3f), K Kennedy (1f), C Neylon 0-2 each, B McMahon, C Lynch, C Sexton 0-1 each. | | P Minogue 1-2 (0-1f, 0-1 '65'), B McNamara 1-0, B Murphy, C McNamara 0-2 each, M McKenna ('65'), A Rodgers (f) 0-1 each. |
