= Bob Doherty =

Irish hurler (1891–1967)

Personal information
- Native name: Roibeard Ó Dochartaigh (Irish)
- Born: 29 May 1891 Newmarket-on-Fergus, County Clare, Ireland
- Died: February 1967 (aged 75) New York City, United States
- Occupation: Labourer

Sport
- Sport: Hurling
- Position: Left wing-back
Clubs
- Years: Club
- Newmarket-on-Fergus; Faughs
Club titles
- Dublin titles: 4
Inter-county
- Years: County
- 1913–1918 1920-1925: Clare; Dublin
Inter-county titles
- Munster titles: 1
- Leinster titles: 3
- All-Irelands: 3

Robert Doherty (29 May 1891 – February 1967) was an Irish hurler. At club level he played with Newmarket-on-Fergus and Faughs, and also lined out at inter-county level with Clare and Dublin.

== Career ==
Doherty first played hurling in his local area with the Newmarket-on-Fergus club. He was part of the Newmarket team that succeeded in winning their very first Clare SHC title in 1912, before claiming a second winners' medal in 1916. Doherty's performances at club level quickly earned him a call-up to the Clare senior hurling team. He won a Munster SHC medal in 1914, before later lining out at wing-back in Clare's defeat of Laois in the 1914 All-Ireland final.

After moving to Dublin, Doherty transferred to the Faughs club. He won four consecutive Dublin SHC medals from 1920 and 1923. Doherty joined the Dublin senior hurling team in 1920, winning a first Leinster SHC medal in his debut season before claiming a second All-Ireland SHC medal after a defeat of Cork in the 1920 All-Ireland final. He claimed further Leinster SHC medals in 1921 and 1924, before winning a third All-Ireland SHC medal after a defeat of Galway in the 1924 All-Ireland final.

Doherty emigrated to the United States in 1926 and continued his hurling career after joining the Tipperary club in New York City. He remained heavily involved in the administrative affairs of the GAA even after his playing career had ended.

== Death ==
Doherty died in New York City in February 1967, at the age of 75.

== Honours ==
Newmarket-on-Fergus

- Clare Senior Hurling Championship: 1912, 1916

Faughs

- Dublin Senior Hurling Championship: 1920, 1921, 1922, 1923

Clare

- All-Ireland Senior Hurling Championship: 1914
- Munster Senior Hurling Championship: 1914

Dublin

- All-Ireland Senior Hurling Championship: 1920, 1924
- Leinster Senior Hurling Championship: 1920, 1921, 1924
