= 1962 Clare Senior Hurling Championship =

Annual hurling competition season

- Champions: Ruan (5th title)
- Runners-up: Sixmilebridge

The 1962 Clare Senior Hurling Championship was the 67th staging of the Clare Senior Hurling Championship since its establishment by the Clare County Board in 1887.

Whitegate entered the championship as the defending champions.

The final, a replay, was played on 2 September 1962 at Cusack Park in Ennis, between Ruan and Sixmilebridge, in what was their first ever meeting in the final. Ruan won the match by 3–09 to 2–08 to claim their fifth championship title overall and a first championship title in two years. It remains the club's last title victory.

== Results ==
=== Final ===
19 August 1962 Final	Ruan	3-04 - 1-10	Sixmilebridge	Cusack Park

=== Final replay ===
2 September 1962 Final replay	Ruan	3-09 - 2-08	Sixmilebridge	Cusack Park
