= 2014 Clare Senior Hurling Championship =

Annual hurling competition season

Canon Hamilton Cup 2014
Championship Details
Dates	17 May - 5 October 2014
Teams	20
Sponsor	Pat O’Donnell & Co.

County Champions
Winners	Cratloe (2nd Title)

County Runners-up
Runners-up	Crusheen

Changes From 2013
Promoted	Whitegate
Relegated	Smith O'Briens, Killaloe

Changes For 2015
Promoted	Feakle
Relegated	Broadford; St. Joseph's, Doora-Barefield; Ruan; Scariff; Wolfe Tones, Shannon

Senior B Champions
Senior B	Éire Óg, Ennis

The 2014 Clare Senior Hurling Championship was the 119th staging of the Clare Senior Hurling Championship since its establishment by the Clare County Board in 1887. The championship began on 17 May 2014 and ended on 5 October 2014.

Sixmilebridge were the defending champions, however, they failed to make it out of the group stage. Cratloe won the title following a 0–14 to 0–6 defeat of Crusheen in the final.

Cratloe won both the Clare Senior Hurling Championship and the Clare Senior Football Championship in 2014. This was the first time that a Clare club had lifted both senior club trophies on the field of play since Ennis Dalcassians completed "The Double" in 1929.

== Senior Championship Knockout Stages ==
=== Quarter-finals ===
- Top two teams from each Senior A Group plus both Senior B Finalists.

30 August 2014 Quarter-Final	Cratloe	2-21 - 2-13	Éire Óg, Ennis	Cusack Park, Ennis

30 August 2014 Quarter-Final	Clonlara	3-20 - 2-11	O'Callaghan's Mills	Cusack Park, Ennis

30 August 2014 Quarter-Final	Crusheen	1-16 - 1-13	Newmarket-on-Fergus	Cusack Park, Ennis

31 August 2014 Quarter-Final	Clarecastle	2-19 - 1-14	Ballyea	Cusack Park, Ennis

=== Semi-finals ===
20 September 2014 Semi-Final	Clonlara	0-08 - 0-10	Crusheen	Cusack Park, Ennis
		Report

21 September 2014 Semi-Final	Cratloe	4-15 - 1-19	Clarecastle	Cusack Park, Ennis
		Report

== County Final ==
5 October 2014 Final	Crusheen	0-06 - 0-14	Cratloe	Cusack Park, Ennis
15:30	Paddy Vaughan 0-5 (3 frees); Colin Vaughan 0-1	Report	Conor McGrath 0-6 (4 frees); Sean Collins, Cathal McInerney 0-2; Gearoid Considine, David Collins, Padraic Collins, Liam Markham (free) 0-1 each	Attendance: 6,369; Referee: S McMahon

Crusheen	Cratloe

== Championship statistics ==
=== Miscellaneous ===
- Cratloe won both the Clare Senior Hurling Championship and the Clare Senior Football Championship to win first 'Double' since Ennis Dalcassians in 1929.
