= 1990 Clare Senior Hurling Championship =

Annual hurling competition season

- Champions: Éire Óg (6th title); Michael Glynn (captain); Martin McKeogh (manager)
- Runners-up: O'Callaghan's Mills; Seán Hehir (captain); Séamus Durack (manager)

The 1990 Clare Senior Hurling Championship was the 95th staging of the Clare Senior Hurling Championship since its establishment by the Clare County Board in 1887.

Sixmilebridge entered the championship as the defending champions.

The final was played on 7 October 1990 at Cusack Park in Ennis, between Éire Óg and O'Callaghan's Mills, in what was their first ever meeting in the final. Éire Óg won the match by 1–05 to 1–03 to claim their sixth championship title overall and a first title in eight years.

== Knockout stage ==
=== Final ===
7 October 1990 Final	Éire Óg	1-05 - 1-03	O'Callaghan's Mills	Cusack Park
	P Barry 1-1, D Coote 0-2, M Nugent 0-1, D Tobin 0-1.		K McNamara 1-1, T Canny 0-1, M Deasy 0-1.
