= 2000 Clare Senior Hurling Championship =

Annual hurling competition season

- Teams: 13
- Sponsor: Auburn Lodge
- Champions: Sixmilebridge (9th title); Christy Chaplin (captain)
- Runners-up: Éire Óg; Declan Tobin (captain)

The 2000 Clare Senior Hurling Championship was the 105th staging of the Clare Senior Hurling Championship since its establishment by the Clare County Board in 1887.

St Joseph's Doora-Barefield entered the championship as the defending champions, however, they were beaten by Éire Óg in the semi-finals.

The final was played on 15 October 2000 at Cusack Park in Ennis, between Sixmilebridge and Éire Óg, in what was their fourth meeting overall in the final and a first meeting in eight years. Sixmilebridge won the match by 4–09 to 1–08 to claim their ninth championship title overall and a first title in five years.

== Results ==
=== Final ===
15 October 2000 Final	Sixmilebridge	4-09 - 1-08	Éire Óg	Cusack Park
