= 1967 Clare Senior Hurling Championship =

Annual hurling competition season

- Champions: Newmarket-on-Fergus (13th title); Pat Cronin (captain)
- Runners-up: Clarecastle; Paddy Russell (captain)

The 1967 Clare Senior Hurling Championship was the 72nd staging of the Clare Senior Hurling Championship since its establishment by the Clare County Board in 1887.

Éire Óg entered the championship as the defending champions.

The final was played on 5 November 1967 at Cusack Park in Ennis, between Newmarket-on-Fergus and Clarecastle, in what was their first meeting in the final in three years. Newmarket-on-Fergus won the match by 3–10 to 2–04 to claim their 13th championship title overall and a first championship title in two years.

== Results ==
=== Final ===
5 November 1967 Final	Newmarket-on-Fergus	3-10 - 2-04	Clarecastle	Cusack Park
