= 1952 Clare Senior Hurling Championship =

Annual hurling competition season

- Champions: Scariff (4th title)
- Runners-up: Sixmilebridge

The 1952 Clare Senior Hurling Championship was the 57th staging of the Clare Senior Hurling Championship since its establishment by the Clare County Board in 1887.

Ruan entered the championship as the defending champions.

The final was played on 28 September 1952 at Cusack Park in Ennis, between Scariff and Sixmilebridge, in what was their first ever meeting in the final. Scariff won the match by 4–06 to 2–00 to claim their fourth championship title overall and a first championship title in six years.

== Results ==
=== Final ===
28 September 1952 Final	Scariff	4-06 - 2-00	Sixmilebridge	Cusack Park
