= 1959 Clare Senior Hurling Championship =

Annual hurling competition season

- Champions: Ruan (3rd title)
- Runners-up: Éire Óg

The 1959 Clare Senior Hurling Championship was the 64th staging of the Clare Senior Hurling Championship since its establishment by the Clare County Board in 1887.

St Joseph's Doora-Barefield entered the championship as the defending champions.

The final was played on 30 August 1959 at Cusack Park in Ennis, between Ruan and Éire Óg, in what was their first ever meeting in the final. Ruan won the match by 2–06 to 0–04 to claim their third championship title overall and a first championship title in eight years.

== Results ==
=== Final ===
| 30 August 1959 Final | Ruan | 2-06 - 0-04 | Éire Óg | Cusack Park |
