= 1966 Clare Senior Hurling Championship =

Annual hurling competition season

- Champions: Éire Óg (3rd title)
- Runners-up: Whitegate

The 1966 Clare Senior Hurling Championship was the 71st staging of the Clare Senior Hurling Championship since its establishment by the Clare County Board in 1887.

Newmarket-on-Fergus entered the championship as the defending champions.

The final was played on 6 November 1966 at Cusack Park in Ennis, between Éire Óg and Whitegate, in what was their second meeting in the final overall. Éire Óg won the match by 2–08 to 1–04 to claim their third championship title overall and a first championship title in nine years.

== Results ==
=== Final ===
6 November 1966 Final	Éire Óg	2-08 - 1-04	Whitegate	Cusack Park
