= 1938 Clare Senior Hurling Championship =

Annual hurling competition season

- Champions: Feakle (2nd title)
- Runners-up: Kilkishen

The 1938 Clare Senior Hurling Championship was the 43rd staging of the Clare Senior Hurling Championship since its establishment by the Clare County Board in 1887.

O'Callaghan's Mills entered the championship as the defending champions.

The final was played on 13 November 1938 at Cusack Park in Ennis, between Feakle and Kilkishen. Feakle won the match by 4–02 to 1–05 to claim their second championship title overall and a first championship title in three years.

== Results ==
=== Final ===
13 November 1938 Final	Feakle	4-02 - 1-05	Kilkishen	Cusack Park
