= 1986 Clare Senior Hurling Championship =

Annual hurling competition season

- Champions: Clarecastle (5th title); Anthony Scanlan (captain)
- Runners-up: O'Callaghan's Mills; Mike Deasy (captain)

The 1986 Clare Senior Hurling Championship was the 91st staging of the Clare Senior Hurling Championship since its establishment by the Clare County Board in 1887.

Kilmaley entered the championship as the defending champions.

The final was played on 5 October 1986 at Cusack Park in Ennis, between Clarecastle and O'Callaghan's Mills, in what was their second meeting in the final overall. Clarecastle won the match by 2–11 to 0–07 to claim their fifth championship title overall and a first championship title in 16 years.

== Results ==
=== Final ===
5 October 1986 Final	Clarecastle	2-11 - 0-07	O'Callaghan's Mills	Cusack Park
