= 1991 Clare Senior Hurling Championship =

Annual hurling competition season

- Champions: Clarecastle (7th title); Paddy Quinn (captain); Oliver Plunkett (manager)
- Runners-up: Scariff; Dan Treacy (captain); Mike McNamara (manager)

The 1991 Clare Senior Hurling Championship was the 96th staging of the Clare Senior Hurling Championship since its establishment by the Clare County Board in 1887.

Éire Óg entered the championship as the defending champions.

The final was played on 22 September 1991 at Cusack Park in Ennis, between Clarecastle and Scariff, in what was their first meeting in the final in 48 years. Clarecastle won the match by 0–14 to 1–05 to claim their seventh championship title overall and a first title in four years.

== Results ==
=== Final ===
22 September 1991 Final	Clarecastle	0-14 - 1-05	Scariff	Cusack Park
	V O'Loughlin 0-6, P Healy 0-2, A Neville 0-2, J Healy 0-2, A Daly 0-1, F Touhy 0-1.		A McGrath 1-0, T McMahon 0-2, J McKenna 0-1, G Rodgers 0-1, P Giblin 0-1.
