= 2002 Clare Senior Hurling Championship =

Annual hurling competition season

- Champions: Sixmilebridge (10th title); Christy Chaplin (captain)
- Runners-up: Clarecastle; Rory Concannon (captain)

The 2002 Clare Senior Hurling Championship was the 107th staging of the Clare Senior Hurling Championship since its establishment by the Clare County Board in 1887.

St Joseph's Doora-Barefield entered the championship as the defending champions, however, they were beaten by Clarecastle in the semi-finals.

The final was played on 3 November 2002 at Cusack Park in Ennis, between Sixmilebridge and Clarecastle, in what was their fourth meeting in the final overall. Sixmilebridge won the match by 3–10 to 2–08 to claim their 10th championship title overall and a first title in two years.

== Results ==
=== Final ===
3 November 2002 Final	Sixmilebridge	3-10 - 2-08	Clarecastle	Cusack Park
	J Reddan 1-3, C Crowe 1-1, N Gilligan 0-4 (1f), J O'Meara 1-0, W Kennedy 0-1, J Chaplin 0-1 (f).		D Quinn 0-5 (2f), D Fitzgerald 1-0, R Fitzgerald 1-0, G Farmer 0-1, S Sheedy 0-1, J Casey 0-1 (f).
