= 1992 Clare Senior Hurling Championship =

Annual hurling competition season

- Champions: Sixmilebridge (6th title); John Chaplin (captain)
- Runners-up: Éire Óg; John Russell (captain)

The 1992 Clare Senior Hurling Championship was the 97th staging of the Clare Senior Hurling Championship since its establishment by the Clare County Board in 1887.

Clarecastle entered the championship as the defending champions.

The final was played on 14 September 1992 at Cusack Park in Ennis, between Sixmilebridge and Éire Óg, in what was their first meeting in the final in nine years. Sixmilebridge won the match by 1–11 to 1–10 to claim their sixth championship title overall and a first title in three years.

== Results ==
=== Final ===
14 September 1992 Final	Sixmilebridge	1-11 - 1-10	Éire Óg	Cusack Park
	G McInerney 1-1, D McInerney 0-4, P McNamara 0-2, P Morey 0-2, E Healy 0-1, N Earley 0-1.		G Logue 0-4, D Tobin 0-2, M Nugent 0-1, G Mannion 0-1, J Russell 0-1, B Keating 0-1.
