= 1951 Clare Senior Hurling Championship =

Annual hurling competition season

- Champions: Ruan (2nd title); J. Hassett (captain)
- Runners-up: St Joseph's

The 1951 Clare Senior Hurling Championship was the 56th staging of the Clare Senior Hurling Championship since its establishment by the Clare County Board in 1887.

Whitegate entered the championship as the defending champions.

The final was played on 9 September 1951 at Cusack Park in Ennis, between Ruan and St Joseph's, in what was their first ever meeting in the final. Ruan won the match by 5–04 to 2–02 to claim their second championship title overall and a first championship title in three years.

== Results ==
=== Final ===
9 September 1951 Final	Ruan	5-04 - 2-02	St Joseph's	Cusack Park
