= 1997 Clare Senior Hurling Championship =

Annual hurling competition season

- Dates: 26 September – 9 November 1997
- Teams: 18
- Sponsor: Auburn Lodge
- Champions: Clarecastle (10th title); Martin Sheedy (captain); Roger McMahon (manager)
- Runners-up: St Joseph's Doora-Barefield; Kieran O'Neill (captain); Louis Mulqueen (manager)

Tournament statistics
- Matches played: 19
- Goals scored: 61 (3.21 per match)
- Points scored: 474 (24.95 per match)
- Top scorer(s): Ken Ralph (4-21)

The 1997 Clare Senior Hurling Championship was the 102nd staging of the Clare Senior Hurling Championship since its establishment by the Clare County Board in 1887. The championship ran from 26 September to 9 November 1997.

Wolfe Tones na Sionna entered the championship as the defending champions, however, they were beaten by Sixmilebridge in the quarter-finals. Bodyke joined the championship as Clare IHC winners from the previous year.

The final was played on 9 November 1997 at Cusack Park in Ennis, between Clarecastle and St Joseph's Doora-Barefield, in what was their second meeting in the final overall and a first meeting in three years. Clarecastle won the match by 2–11 to 0–11 to claim their 10th championship title overall and a first title in three years.

Clarecastle's Ken Ralph was the championship's top scorer with 4–21.

== Team changes ==
=== To Championship ===
Promoted from the Clare Intermediate Hurling Championship

- Bodyke

== Results ==
=== Preliminary round ===
| 27 September 1997 Preliminary round | Clarecastle | 2-12 - 3-09 | Tulla | Fr Murphy Memorial Park |
| | J Pyne 0-7, V O'Loughlin 1-0, G O'Loughlin 1-0, P Healy 0-2, A Neville 0-1. | | J McInerney 2-5, S McInerney 1-0, D McInerney 0-2, M Quinn 0-2, J Leamy 0-1. |

| 27 September 1997 Preliminary round | Kilmaley | 1-08 - 3-08 | O'Callaghan's Mills | Cusack Park |
| | J McMahon 1-1, B Healy 0-3, C Clancy 0-2, P Healy 0-1. | | B McNamara 1-2, PJ O'Connell 1-0, D Donovan 1-0, B Noonan 0-2, B Madden 0-2, K McNamara 0-1, M Deasy 0-1. |

| 5 October 1997 Preliminary round replay | Clarecastle | 1-12 - 2-05 | Tulla | Fr Murphy Memorial Park |
| | J Pyne 1-2, A Neville 0-3, K Ralph 0-3, P Healy 0-1, K Morrissey 0-1, R Fitzgerald 0-1, J Healy 0-1. | | M Quinn 1-0, M Corry 1-0, J McInerney 0-3, J Littleton 0-1, S Littleton 0-1. |

=== First round ===
| 26 September 1997 First round | Wolfe Tones na Sionna | 3-16 - 1-06 | Feakle | Páirc an Dálaigh |
| | P Keary 1-7, Paul O'Rourke 1-2, B O'Neill 1-0, F Lohan 0-3, S Power 0-2, Pat O'Rourke 0-2. | | V Donnellan 1-4, J Punch 0-2. |

| 27 September 1997 First round | Tubber/Ruan | 2-12 - 2-08 | Corofin | Cusack Park |
| | M Daffy 0-4, E Taaffe 0-4, T Donoghue 1-0, C Lee 1-0, C Early 0-2, P Custy 0-1, D O'Brien 0-1. | | F Lahiffe 0-7, O O'Loughlin 1-0, M Shannon 1-0, F Kelly 0-1. |

| 27 September 1997 First round | Cratloe | 0-14 - 1-11 | Ogonnelloe | Broadford Grounds |
| | D Considine 0-10, S Ryan 0-1, R O'Hara 0-1, G Considine 0-1. | | M Sheedy 1-5, D Forde 0-3, J McKenna 0-2, N Gavin 0-1. |

| 27 September 1997 First round | Scariff | 0-14 - 3-13 | Éire Óg | Páirc an Dálaigh |
| | B Murphy 0-5, M McKenna 0-4, B McNamara 0-2, A Rodgers 0-2, D Murphy 0-1. | | C Egan 1-3, T Corbett 0-4, F Flynn 1-0, S Lyne 1-0, B Keating 0-3, C Lynch 0-1, D Tobin 0-1, S McNamara 0-1. |

| 27 September 1997 First round | Whitegate | 0-11 - 4-16 | St Joseph's Doora-Barefield | Páirc an Dálaigh |
| | B Minogue 0-8, E Minogue 0-2, M Solan 0-1. | | A Whelan 1-5, C O'Connor 1-3, F O'Sullivan 1-1, S McMahon 0-4, D Daly 1-0, J O'Connor 0-2, G Baker 0-1. |

| 28 September 1997 First round | Sixmilebridge | 0-18 - 1-03 | Inagh-Kilnamona | Fr Murphy Memorial Park |
| | M Conlon 0-7, David Chaplin 0-3, N Gilligan 0-3, A White 0-2, N Earley 0-2, J Chaplin 0-1. | | P McGuane 1-0, F Barry 0-1, D Hegarty 0-1, F Fitzgerald 0-1. |

| 4 October 1997 First round | Bodyke | 0-08 - 3-14 | O'Callaghan's Mills | Páirc an Dálaigh |
| | S Doyle 0-6, L Doyle 0-1, PJ Kelleher 0-1. | | K McNamara 2-0, J Cleary 1-3, B Noonan 0-3, B McNamara 0-3, M Deasy 0-2, D Donovan 0-1, B Madden 0-1, PJ O'Connell 0-1. |

| 5 October 1997 First round replay | Cratloe | 1-15 - 0-13 | Ogonnelloe | Broadford Grounds |
| | D Considine 1-1, G Considine 0-3, N McMahon 0-2, M O'Gorman 0-1, K Galvin 0-1, R O'Hara 0-1. | | M Sheedy 0-7, D Forde 0-4, J McKenna 0-1, E Sheedy 0-1. |

| 11 October 1997 First round | Clarecastle | 2-16 - 1-03 | Newmarket-on-Fergus | Cusack Park |
| | J Pyne 0-6, A Neville 1-2, K Ralph 1-1, V O'Loughlin 0-2, R Fitzgerald 0-2, K Morrissey 0-1, F Tuohy 0-1, P Healy 0-1. | | E Marren 1-0, B Clancy 0-2, G Cleary 0-1. |

=== Quarter-finals ===
| 12 October 1997 Quarter-final | Sixmilebridge | 1-17 - 0-14 | Wolfe Tones na Sionna | Cusack Park |
| | N Gilligan 1-3, M Conlon 0-4, J Reddan 0-4, David Chaplin 0-4, S Fitzpatrick 0-1, Danny Chaplin 0-1. | | P Keary 0-3, B O'Neill 0-3, D Collins 0-2, P O'Rourke 0-2, D O'Riordan 0-2, F Carrig 0-1, M Lennon 0-1. |

| 18 October 1997 Quarter-final | O'Callaghan's Mills | 2-13 - 1-15 | Éire Óg | Cusack Park |
| | B Madden 0-8, B McNamara 1-4, P McKeogh 1-0, B Noonan 0-1. | | F Flynn 1-1, S McNamara 0-3, C Egan 0-3, T Corbett 0-3, B Keating 0-2, D Tobin 0-2, C Lynch 0-1. |

| 19 October 1997 Quarter-final | St Joseph's Doora-Barefield | 2-11 - 4-04 | Cratloe | O'Garney Park |
| | F O'Sullivan 2-2, J O'Connor 0-4, O Baker 0-2, S McMahon 0-1, L Hassett 0-1, N Brodie 0-1. | | K Galvin 3-0, S Ryan 0-4, N McMahon 1-0. |

| 19 October 1997 Quarter-final | Clarecastle | 2-20 - 2-12 | Tubber/Ruan | Cusack Park |
| | K Ralph 1-7, A Neville 1-3, R Fitzgerald 0-5, V O'Loughlin 0-2, K Morrissey 0-1, F Tuohy 0-1, D Scanlan 0-1. | | E Taaffe 0-7, C Lyons 1-2, E Scanlan 1-0, O Clancy 0-1, C Lee 0-1, T O'Donoghue 0-1. |

=== Semi-finals ===
| 26 October 1997 Semi-final | Clarecastle | 3-17 - 3-09 | O'Callaghan's Mills | Cusack Park |
| | K Ralph 1-5, A Neville 1-1, P Healy 0-4, V O'Loughlin 1-0, R Fitzgerald 0-3, D Scanlan 0-2, F Tuohy 0-2. | | B Madden 1-4, B Noonan 1-1, P McKeogh 1-0, B McNamara 0-1, J Cleary 0-1, K McNamara 0-1, M Deasy 0-1. |

| 26 October 1997 Semi-final | St Joseph's Doora-Barefield | 2-12 - 1-13 | Sixmilebridge | Cusack Park |
| | S McMahon 0-6, A Whelan 1-1, O Baker 1-0, F O'Sullivan 0-1, B O'Rourke 0-1, J O'Connor 0-1, C Mullan 0-1, C O'Neill 0-1. | | M Conlon 0-5, J Chaplin 1-1, N Gilligan 0-2, David Chaplin 0-1, S Fitzpatrick 0-1, G McInerney 0-1, Danny Chaplin 0-1, J Reddan 0-1. |

=== Final ===
| 9 November 1997 Final | Clarecastle | 2-11 - 0-11 | St Joseph's Doora-Barefield | Cusack Park |
| | K Ralph 1-5, R Fitzgerald 1-1, F Tuohy 0-2, P Healy 0-1, G O'Loughlin 0-1, A Neville 0-1. | | S McMahon 0-5, J O'Connor 0-4, L Hassett 0-1, N Brody 0-1. | Referee: S McMahon |

== Championship statistics ==
=== Top scorers ===
Overall

| Rank | Player | Club | Tally | Total | Matches | Average |
|---|---|---|---|---|---|---|
| 1 | Ken Ralph | Clarecastle | 4-21 | 33 | 5 | 6.60 |
| 2 | Alan Neville | Clarecastle | 3-11 | 20 | 6 | 3.66 |
| 3 | John Pyne | Clarecastle | 1-15 | 18 | 6 | 3.00 |
| 4 | Brian Madden | O'Callaghan's Millsy | 4-21 | 33 | 5 | 6.60 |
| 5 | Seánie McMahon | St Joseph's Doora-Barefield | 0-16 | 16 | 4 | 4.00 |
| 5 | Martin Conlon | Sixmilebridge | 0-16 | 16 | 3 | 5.33 |
