= 1978 Clare Senior Hurling Championship =

Annual hurling competition season

- Champions: Newmarket-on-Fergus (21st title); J McMahon (captain)
- Runners-up: Clarecastle; H Russell (captain)

The 1978 Clare Senior Hurling Championship was the 83rd staging of the Clare Senior Hurling Championship since its establishment by the Clare County Board in 1887.

Sixmilebridge entered the championship as the defending champions.

The final was played on 22 October 1978 at Dr Daly Memorial Park in Tulla, between Newmarket-on-Fergus and Clarecastle, in what was their first meeting in the final in five years. Newmarket-on-Fergus won the match by 3–10 to 2–08 to claim their 21st championship title overall and a first championship title in two years.

== Results ==
=== Final ===
22 October 1978 Final	Newmarket-on-Fergus	3-10 - 2-08	Clarecastle	Dr Daly Memorial Park
