= 1983 Clare Senior Hurling Championship =

Annual hurling competition season

1979 Clare Senior Hurling Championship
- Champions: Sixmilebridge (3rd title); Gerry McInerney (captain)
- Runners-up: Éire Óg; Paddy Kelly (captain)

The 1983 Clare Senior Hurling Championship was the 88th staging of the Clare Senior Hurling Championship since its establishment by the Clare County Board in 1887.

Éire Óg entered the championship as the defending champions.

The final, a replay, was played on 30 October 1983 at Cusack Park in Ennis, between Sixmilebridge and Éire Óg, in what was their first ever meeting in the final. Sixmilebridge won the match by 1–10 to 1–07 to claim their third championship title overall and a first championship title in four years.

== Results ==
=== Final ===
2 October 1983 Final	Sixmilebridge	1-10 - 3-04	Éire Óg	Cusack Park

=== Final replay ===
30 October 1983 Final replay	Sixmilebridge	1-10 - 1-07	Éire Óg	Cusack Park
