= 2001 Clare Senior Hurling Championship =

Annual hurling competition season

- Dates: 8 June – 7 October 2001
- Teams: 14
- Sponsor: Lynch Hotels
- Champions: St Joseph's Doora-Barefield (5th title); Seánie McMahon (captain); Michael Clohessy (manager)
- Runners-up: Sixmilebridge; Davy Fitzgerald (captain); Paddy Meehan (manager)

Tournament statistics
- Top scorer(s): Niall Gilligan (5–34)

The 2001 Clare Senior Hurling Championship was the 106th staging of the Clare Senior Hurling Championship since its establishment by the Clare County Board in 1887. The championship draw was made on 13 May 2001. The championship ran from 8 June to 7 October 2001.

Sixmilebridge entered the championship as the defending champions.

The final was played on 7 October 2001 at Cusack Park in Ennis, between St Joseph's Doora-Barefield and Sixmilebridge, in what was their second meeting in the final overall and a first meeting in two years. St Joseph's Doora-Barefield won the match by 1–15 to 1–12 to claim their fifth championship title overall and a first title in two years.

Niall Gilligan was the championship's top scorer with 5–34.

== Format change ==
The championship underwent a format change with the introduction of a group stage. The 12 participating teams were divided into three groups of four teams, from which two teams emerged from each for the quarter-finals. The remaining two quarter-finalists were the winners of each of the two groups in the Clare Senior B Hurling Championship.

== Results ==
=== Quarter-finals ===
26 August 2001 Quarter-final	Sixmilebridge	2-18 - 2-05	Clonlara	Cusack Park
	N Gilligan 1-8, J O'Meara 1-2, B Culbert 0-3, J Chaplin 0-2, C Chaplin 0-1, A Chaplin 0-1, M Culbert 0-1.		A O'Connell 1-2, W Slattery 1-0, T O'Donovan 0-2, D Conway 0-1.

26 August 2001 Quarter-final	St Joseph's Doora-Barefield	1-12 - 0-12	Clarecastle	Cusack Park
	J O'Connor 0-6, C O'Neill 1-2, S McMahon 0-3, L Hassett 0-1.		K Ralph 0-6, A O'Loughlin 0-2, E Flynn 0-1, D Quinn 0-1, S Moloney 0-1, J Pyne 0-1.

26 August 2001 Quarter-final	Kilmaley	1-10 - 2-07	Wolfe Tones na Sionna	Cusack Park
	A Markham 0-5, D McMahon 1-0, J McMahon 0-2, E Slattery 0-1, D Neylon 0-1, A Cahill 0-1.		G McPhillips 0-5, Paul O'Rourke 1-1, D O'Rourke 1-0, F Lohan 0-1.

27 August 2001 Quarter-final	Éire Óg	2-12 - 0-12	Kilnamona	Cusack Park
	C Egan 0-5, S McNamara 1-1, B Nugent 0-4, T Corbett 1-0, F Flynn 0-1, T McNamara 0-1.		D Gannon 0-9, F Hegarty 0-3.

1 September 2001 Quarter-final replay	Kilmaley	1-09 - 0-09	Wolfe Tones na Sionna	Cusack Park
	D Neylon 1-1, C Lynch 0-4, A Markham 0-2, D McMahon 0-1, C McMahon 0-1.		G McPhillips 0-4, D O'Rourke 0-2, F Lohan 0-2, K McCarthy 0-1.

=== Semi-finals ===
15 September 2001 Semi-final	Sixmilebridge	4-13 - 1-09	Kilmaley	Cusack Park
	N Gilligan 3-10, J Chaplin 1-0, D Fitzgerald 0-1, C Chaplin 0-1, B Culbert 0-1.		A Markham 1-4, C Lynch 0-2, B Healy 0-2, B McMahon 0-1.

Semi-final	St Joseph's Doora-Barefield	5-16 - 1-05	Éire Óg	Cusack Park
	L Hassett 2-3, J O'Connor 1-6, O Baker 1-1, C O'Neill 1-0, C Mullen 0-2, S McMahon 0-1, N Brodie 0-1, G Baker 0-1, D Kennedy 0-1.		F Flynn 1-1, C Egan 0-1, R Lynch 0-1, T Corbett 0-1, B Nugent 0-1.

=== Final ===
7 October 2001 Final	St Joseph's Doora-Barefield	1-15 - 1-12	Sixmilebridge	Cusack Park
	C Mullen 1-2, J O'Connor 0-5, S McMahon 0-3, L Hassett, D Kennedy 0-2; O Baker 0-1.	Report	N Gilligan 1-9, J Reddan, D Fitzgerald, C Crowe 0-1.	Referee: A Heagney
