= 2006 Clare Senior Hurling Championship =

Annual hurling competition season

- Champions: Wolfe Tones (2nd title); Barry Loughnane (captain); Pat O'Rourke (manager)
- Runners-up: Newmarket-on-Fergus; Shane O'Brien (captain); Séamus Durack (manager)

The 2006 Clare Senior Hurling Championship was the 111th staging of the Clare Senior Hurling Championship since its establishment by the Clare County Board in 1887.

Clarecastle entered the championship as the defending champions.

The final was played on 22 October 2006 at Cusack Park in Ennis, between Wolfe Tones and Newmarket-on-Fergus, in what was their first ever meeting in the final. Wolfe Tones won the match by 2–11 to 0–13 to claim their second championship title overall and a first title in 10 years.

== Results ==
=== Final ===
22 October 2006 Final	Wolfe Tones	2-11 - 0-13	Newmarket-on-Fergus	Cusack Park
	G McPhillips 1-6 (3f, 1 '65') D O'Connell 1-0, Declan O'Rurke 0-2, B McPhillips 0-1, B O'Connell 0-1, K McArthy 0-1;		B Gaffney 0-7 (5f 1 '65') C Ryan 0-2, D Barrett 0-2, S Arthur 0-1, Jim McInerney 0-1.
