= 1950 Clare Senior Hurling Championship =

Annual hurling competition season

- Champions: Whitegate (1st title)
- Runners-up: Ruan

The 1950 Clare Senior Hurling Championship was the 55th staging of the Clare Senior Hurling Championship since its establishment by the Clare County Board in 1887.

Clarecastle entered the championship as the defending champions.

The final was played on 24 September 1950 at Cusack Park in Ennis, between Whitegate and Ruan, in what was their first ever meeting in the final. Whitegate won the match by 5–01 to 3–01 to claim their first ever championship title.

== Results ==
=== Final ===
24 September 1950 Final	Whitegate	5-01 - 3-01	Ruan	Cusack Park
