= 2009 Clare Senior Hurling Championship =

Annual hurling competition season

- Champions: Cratloe (1st title); Barry Duggan (captain)
- Runners-up: Clonlara; Tomás O'Donovan (captain)

The 2009 Clare Senior Hurling Championship was the 114th staging of the Clare Senior Hurling Championship since its establishment by the Clare County Board in 1887.

Clonlara entered the championship as the defending champions.

The final was played on 1 November 2009 at Cusack Park in Ennis, between Cratloe and Clonlara, in what was their first ever meeting in the final. Cratloe won the match by 3–05 to 1–09 to claim their first ever championship title.

== Results ==
=== Final ===
1 November 2009 Final	Cratloe	3-05 - 1-09	Clonlara	Cusack Park
	C McGrath (2-1), P Chaplin (1-0), S Chaplin (0-2), 1 free; D Browne (0-2), both frees.	Report	D Madden (0-4), 3 frees; C Fennessy (1-0); N O’Connell (free); J Conlon, C O’Donovan, D Honan, T Lynch (0-1) each.
