= 1980 Clare Senior Hurling Championship =

Annual hurling competition season

- Champions: Éire Óg (4th title); D. Coote (captain)
- Runners-up: Newmarket-on-Fergus; P. O'Leary (captain)

The 1980 Clare Senior Hurling Championship was the 85th staging of the Clare Senior Hurling Championship since its establishment by the Clare County Board in 1887.

Sixmilebridge entered the championship as the defending champions.

The final was played on 28 September 1980 at Cusack Park in Ennis, between Éire Óg and Newmarket-on-Fergus, in what was their third meeting in the final overall. Éire Óg won the match by 3–10 to 1–09 to claim their fourth championship title overall and a first championship title in 14 years.

== Results ==
=== Final ===
28 September 1980 Final	Éire Óg	3-10 - 1-09	Newmarket-on-Fergus	Cusack Park
