= 1957 Clare Senior Hurling Championship =

Annual hurling competition season

- Champions: Éire Óg (2nd title); Michael Blake (captain)
- Runners-up: Whitegate

The 1957 Clare Senior Hurling Championship was the 62nd staging of the Clare Senior Hurling Championship since its establishment by the Clare County Board in 1887.

Éire Óg entered the championship as the defending champions.

The final was played on 25 August 1957 at Cusack Park in Ennis, between Éire Óg and Whitegate, in what was their first ever meeting in the final. Éire Óg won the match by 5–09 to 2–03 to claim their second championship title in succession.

== Results ==
=== Final ===
25 August 1957 Final	Éire Óg	5-09 - 2-03	Whitegate	Cusack Park
