= 1955 Clare Senior Hurling Championship =

Annual hurling competition season

- Champions: Newmarket-on-Fergus (9th title); Jimmy Halpin (captain)
- Runners-up: Éire Óg

The 1955 Clare Senior Hurling Championship was the 60th staging of the Clare Senior Hurling Championship since its establishment by the Clare County Board in 1887.

St Joseph's Doora-Barefield entered the championship as the defending champions.

The final was played on 25 September 1955 at Cusack Park in Ennis, between Newmarket-on-Fergus and Éire Óg, in what was their first ever meeting in the final. Newmarket-on-Fergus won the match by 3–09 to 3–03 to claim their ninth championship title overall and a first championship title in 19 years.

== Results ==
=== Final ===
25 September 1955 Final	Newmarket-on-Fergus	3-09 - 3-03	Éire Óg	Cusack Park
