= 1925 Clare Senior Hurling Championship =

Annual hurling competition season

- Champions: Newmarket-on-Fergus (3rd title); Mick Doherty (captain)
- Runners-up: Tulla

The 1925 Clare Senior Hurling Championship was the 30th staging of the Clare Senior Hurling Championship since its establishment by the Clare County Board in 1887.

Ennis Dalcassians entered the championship as the defending champions.

The final was played on 29 November 1925 at the Showgrounds in Ennis, between Newmarket-on-Fergus and Tulla. Newmarket-on-Fergus won the match by 4–02 to 0–03 to claim their third championship title overall and a first championship title in nine years.

== Results ==
=== Final ===
29 November 1925 Final	Newmarket-on-Fergus	4-02 - 0-03	Tulla	Ennis Showgrounds
