= 1927 Clare Senior Hurling Championship =

Annual hurling competition season

- Champions: Newmarket-on-Fergus (5th title); Mick Doherty (captain)
- Runners-up: Ennis Dalcassians

The 1927 Clare Senior Hurling Championship was the 32nd staging of the Clare Senior Hurling Championship since its establishment by the Clare County Board in 1887.

Newmarket-on-Fergus entered the championship as the defending champions.

The final was played on 2 October 1927 at the Showgrounds in Ennis, between Newmarket-on-Fergus and Ennis Dalcassians. Newmarket-on-Fergus won the match to claim their fifth championship title overall and a third championship title in succession.
