= 1956 Clare Senior Hurling Championship =

Annual hurling competition season

- Champions: Éire Óg (1st title); Gerry Cronin (captain)
- Runners-up: Clarecastle

The 1956 Clare Senior Hurling Championship was the 61st staging of the Clare Senior Hurling Championship since its establishment by the Clare County Board in 1887.

Newmarket-on-Fergus entered the championship as the defending champions.

The final was played on 30 September 1956 at Cusack Park in Ennis, between Éire Óg and Clarecastle, in what was their first ever meeting in the final. Éire Óg won the match by 4–05 to 2–08 to claim their first ever championship title.

== Results ==
=== Final ===
30 September 1956 Final	Éire Óg	4-05 - 2-08	Clarecastle	Cusack Park
