= 2007 Clare Senior Hurling Championship =

Annual hurling competition season

- Champions: Tulla (8th title); Michael Murphy (captain); Jim McInerney (manager)
- Runners-up: Crusheen; Tony Meaney (captain); Séamus Cunningham (manager)

The 2007 Clare Senior Hurling Championship was the 112th staging of the Clare Senior Hurling Championship since its establishment by the Clare County Board in 1887.

Wolfe Tones entered the championship as the defending champions.

The final was played on 21 October 2007 at Cusack Park in Ennis, between Tulla and Crusheen, in what was their first ever meeting in the final. Tulla won the match by 1–07 to 0–09 to claim their eighth championship title overall and a first title in 84 years.

== Results ==
=== Final ===
21 October 2007 Final	Tulla	1-07 - 0-09	Crusheen	Cusack Park
	E Torpey 0-3 (f), B Quinn 1-0, D O'Halloran 0-1, A Lynch 0-2, K Brennan 0-1		G O'Grady 0-3, G O'Donnell 0-2, P Vaughan 0-2, B McMahon 0-1, C Dillon 0-1
