= 1916 Clare Senior Hurling Championship =

Annual hurling competition season

- Champions: Newmarket-on-Fergus (2nd title); Bob Doherty (captain)
- Runners-up: Ennis Dalcassians

The 1916 Clare Senior Hurling Championship was the 24th staging of the Clare Senior Hurling Championship since its establishment by the Clare County Board in 1887.

Ennis Dalcassians entered the championship as the defending champions.

The final was played on 24 June 1916 at P. J. Flanagan's Field in Newmarket, between Newmarket-on-Fergus and Ennis Dalcassians. Newmarket-on-Fergus won the match by 8–02 to 2–02 to claim their second championship title overall and a first championship title in four years.

== Results ==
=== Final ===
24 June 1916 Final	Newmarket-on-Fergus	8-02 - 2-02	Ennis Dalcassians	P. J. Flanagan's Field
