= 1981 Clare Senior Hurling Championship =

Annual hurling competition season

- Champions: Newmarket-on-Fergus (22nd title); John Ryan (captain)
- Runners-up: Tubber; Enda O'Connor (captain)

The 1981 Clare Senior Hurling Championship was the 86th staging of the Clare Senior Hurling Championship since its establishment by the Clare County Board in 1887.

Éire Óg entered the championship as the defending champions.

The final was played on 30 August 1981 at Cusack Park in Ennis, between Newmarket-on-Fergus and Tubber, in what was their first ever meeting in the final. Newmarket-on-Fergus won the match by 3–08 to 1–10 to claim a record 22nd championship title overall and a first championship title in three years.

== Results ==
=== Final ===
30 August 1981 Final	Newmarket-on-Fergus	3-08 - 1-10	Tubber	Cusack Park
	T Ryan 2-1, P McNamara 1-1, P O'Leary 0-2, D Hayes 0-1, J Crimmins 0-1, S Liddy 0-1, P Devanney 0-1.		M Clancy 0-5, P O'Connor 1-0, E O'Connor 0-2, M O'Connor 0-1, G Lee 0-1, D O'Loughlin 0-1.
