= 1976 Clare Senior Hurling Championship =

Annual hurling competition season

- Champions: Newmarket-on-Fergus (20th title); Jimmy McNamara (captain)
- Runners-up: Sixmilebridge; J Keogh (captain)

The 1976 Clare Senior Hurling Championship was the 81st staging of the Clare Senior Hurling Championship since its establishment by the Clare County Board in 1887.

Brian Boru's entered the championship as the defending champions.

The final was played on 24 October 1976 at Cusack Park in Ennis, between Newmarket-on-Fergus and Sixmilebridge, in what was their first ever meeting in the final. Newmarket-on-Fergus won the match by 1–11 to 1–05 to claim their 20th championship title overall and a first championship title in two years.

== Results ==
=== Final ===
24 October 1976 Final	Newmarket-on-Fergus	1-11 - 1-05	Sixmilebridge	Cusack Park
