= 1944 Clare Senior Hurling Championship =

Annual hurling competition season

- Champions: Feakle (5th title)
- Runners-up: Clooney

The 1944 Clare Senior Hurling Championship was the 49th staging of the Clare Senior Hurling Championship since its establishment by the Clare County Board in 1887.

Clarecastle entered the championship as the defending champions.

The final was played on 10 September 1944 at Cusack Park in Ennis, between Feakle and Clooney in what was their second meeting in the final overall. Feakle won the match by 9–03 to 0–04 to claim their fifth championship title overall and a first championship title in four years.

== Results ==
=== Final ===
| 10 September 1944 Final | Feakle | 9-07 - 0-04 | Clooney | Cusack Park |
