= 1989 Clare Senior Hurling Championship =

Annual hurling competition season

- Champions: Sixmilebridge (5th title); Flan Quilligan (captain); Jim Fawl (manager)
- Runners-up: Clarecastle; Barney Lynch (captain); Pat Kelly (manager)

The 1989 Clare Senior Hurling Championship was the 94th staging of the Clare Senior Hurling Championship since its establishment by the Clare County Board in 1887.

Feakle entered the championship as the defending champions, however, they were beaten by Sixmilebridge in the semi-finals.

The final was played on 22 October 1989 at Cusack Park in Ennis, between Sixmilebridge and Clarecastle, in what was their first meeting in the final in five years. Sixmilebridge won the match by 3–14 to 1–11 to claim their fifth championship title overall and a first title in five years.

== Results ==
=== Semi-finals ===
1 October 1989 Semi-final	Clarecastle	3-11 - 1-10	Scariff	Cusack Park

1 October 1989 Semi-final	Sixmilebridge	2-11 - 2-08	Feakle	Cusack Park

=== Final ===
22 October 1989 Final	Sixmilebridge	3-14 - 1-11	Clarecastle	Cusack Park
	D McInerney 1-5, J Lynch 1-2, G McInerney 1-1, F Quilligan 0-3, J Chaplin 0-1, JJ Murphy 0-1, D Chaplin 0-1.		A Neville 0-3, P Russell 0-3, G O'Loughlin 1-0, A Daly 0-1, V O'Loughlin 0-1, C Martin 0-1, L McNamara 0-1, F Touhy 0-1.
