= 1931 Clare Senior Hurling Championship =

Annual hurling competition season

- Champions: Newmarket-on-Fergus (7th title); John Joe Doyle (captain)
- Runners-up: Ennis Dalcassians

The 1931 Clare Senior Hurling Championship was the 36th staging of the Clare Senior Hurling Championship since its establishment by the Clare County Board in 1887.

Newmarket-on-Fergus entered the championship as the defending champions.

The final was played on 6 September 1931 at the Showgrounds in Ennis, between Newmarket-on-Fergus and Ennis Dalcassians, in what was their fifth consecutive meeting in the final. Newmarket-on-Fergus won the match by 3–04 to 1–03 to claim their seventh championship title overall and a second championship title in succession.

== Results ==
=== Final ===
6 September 1931 Final	Newmarket-on-Fergus	3-04 - 1-03	Ennis Dalcassians	Ennis Showgrounds
