= 1937 Clare Senior Hurling Championship =

Annual hurling competition season

- Champions: O' (8th title)
- Runners-up: Clarecastle

The 1937 Clare Senior Hurling Championship was the 42nd staging of the Clare Senior Hurling Championship since its establishment by the Clare County Board in 1887.

Newmarket-on-Fergus entered the championship as the defending champions.

The final was played on 26 September 1937 at Cusack Park in Ennis, between O'Callaghan's Mills and Clarecastle, in what was their first ever meeting in the final. O'Callaghan's Mills won the match by 5–02 to 2–02 to claim their eighth championship title overall and a first championship title in five years.

== Results ==
=== Final ===
26 September 1937 Final	O'Callaghan's Mills	5-02 - 2-02	Clarecastle	Cusack Park
