= 1939 Clare Senior Hurling Championship =

Annual hurling competition season

- Champions: Feakle (3rd title)
- Runners-up: Clarecastle

The 1939 Clare Senior Hurling Championship was the 44th staging of the Clare Senior Hurling Championship since its establishment by the Clare County Board in 1887.

Feakle entered the championship as the defending champions.

The final was played on 19 November 1939 at Cusack Park in Ennis, between Feakle and Clarecastle. Feakle won the match by 4–07 to 3–05 to claim their third championship title overall and a second championship title in succession.

== Results ==
=== Final ===
19 November 1939 Final	Feakle	4-07 - 3-05	Kilkishen	Cusack Park
