= 1982 Clare Senior Hurling Championship =

Annual hurling competition season

- Champions: Éire Óg (5th title); T. Nugent (captain)
- Runners-up: Sixmilebridge; J. Fitzpatrick (captain)

The 1982 Clare Senior Hurling Championship was the 87th staging of the Clare Senior Hurling Championship since its establishment by the Clare County Board in 1887.

Newmarket-on-Fergus entered the championship as the defending champions.

The final, a replay, was played on 26 September 1982 at Cusack Park in Ennis, between Éire Óg and Sixmilebridge, in what was their first ever meeting in the final. Éire Óg won the match by 3–08 to 2–09 to claim their fifth championship title overall and a first championship title in two years.

== Results ==
=== Final ===
29 August 1982 Final	Éire Óg	2-11 - 2-11	Sixmilebridge	Cusack Park

=== Final replay ===
26 September 1982 Final replay	Éire Óg	3-08 - 2-09	Sixmilebridge	Cusack Park
