= 1936 Clare Senior Hurling Championship =

Annual hurling competition season

- Champions: Newmarket-on-Fergus (8th title)
- Runners-up: Clarecastle

The 1936 Clare Senior Hurling Championship was the 41st staging of the Clare Senior Hurling Championship since its establishment by the Clare County Board in 1887.

Feakle entered the championship as the defending champions.

The final was played on 11 October 1936 at Cusack Park in Ennis, between Newmarket-on-Fergus and Clarecastle, in what was their first ever meeting in the final. Newmarket-on-Fergus won the match by 6–02 to 2–03 to claim their eighth championship title overall and a first championship title in five years.

== Results ==
=== Final ===
11 October 1936 Final	Newmarket-on-Fergus	6-02 - 2-03	Clarecastle	Cusack Park
