= 1953 Clare Senior Hurling Championship =

Annual hurling competition season

- Champions: Scariff (5th title); Paddy Walsh (captain)
- Runners-up: Newmarket-on-Fergus; Raymond McNamara (captain)

The 1953 Clare Senior Hurling Championship was the 58th staging of the Clare Senior Hurling Championship since its establishment by the Clare County Board in 1887.

Scariff entered the championship as the defending champions.

The final was played on 11 October 1953 at Cusack Park in Ennis, between Scariff and Newmarket-on-Fergus, in what was their first ever meeting in the final. Scariff won the match by 5–02 to 2–07 to claim their fifth championship title overall and a second championship title in succession.

== Results ==
=== Final ===
| 11 October 1953 Final | Scariff | 5-02 - 2-07 | Newmarket-on-Fergus | Cusack Park |
