= 1946 Clare Senior Hurling Championship =

Annual hurling competition season

- Champions: Scariff (3rd title)
- Runners-up: Feakle

The 1946 Clare Senior Hurling Championship was the 51st staging of the Clare Senior Hurling Championship since its establishment by the Clare County Board in 1887.

Clarecastle entered the championship as the defending champions.

The final was played at Cusack Park in Ennis, between Scariff and Feakle, in what was their first meeting in the final in 29 years. Scariff won the match to claim their third championship title overall and a first championship title in 29 years.
