= 1973 Clare Senior Hurling Championship =

Annual hurling competition season

- Champions: Newmarket-on-Fergus (18th title); Michael Kilmartin (captain)
- Runners-up: Clarecastle; Chris Hanrahan (captain)

The 1973 Clare Senior Hurling Championship was the 78th staging of the Clare Senior Hurling Championship since its establishment by the Clare County Board in 1887.

Newmarket-on-Fergus entered the championship as the defending champions.

The final was played on 9 September 1973 at Cusack Park in Ennis, between Newmarket-on-Fergus and Clarecastle, in what was their first meeting in the final in two years. Newmarket-on-Fergus won the match by 7–10 to 4–16 to claim their 18th championship title overall and a third championship title in succession.

== Results ==
=== Final ===
9 September 1973 Final	Newmarket-on-Fergus	7-10 - 4-16	Clarecastle	Cusack Park
