= 1945 Clare Senior Hurling Championship =

Annual hurling competition season

- Champions: Clarecastle (2nd title)
- Runners-up: Scariff

The 1945 Clare Senior Hurling Championship was the 50th staging of the Clare Senior Hurling Championship since its establishment by the Clare County Board in 1887.

Feakle entered the championship as the defending champions.

The final was played at Cusack Park in Ennis, between Clarecastle and Scariff in what was their second meeting in the final overall. Clarecastle won the match to claim their second championship title overall and a first championship ttile in two years.
