= 1968 Clare Senior Hurling Championship =

Annual hurling competition season

- Champions: Newmarket-on-Fergus (14th title); J. Cullinan (captain)
- Runners-up: Clarecastle; T. Slattery (captain)

The 1968 Clare Senior Hurling Championship was the 73rd staging of the Clare Senior Hurling Championship since its establishment by the Clare County Board in 1887.

Newmarket-on-Fergus entered the championship as the defending champions.

The final was played on 8 September 1968 at Cusack Park in Ennis, between Newmarket-on-Fergus and Clarecastle, in what was their second consecutive meeting in the final. Newmarket-on-Fergus won the match by 2–08 to 1–09 to claim their 15th championship title overall and a third championship title in succession.

== Results ==
=== Final ===
8 September 1968 Final	Newmarket-on-Fergus	2-08 - 1-09	Clarecastle	Cusack Park
