= 1970 Clare Senior Hurling Championship =

Annual hurling competition season

- Champions: Clarecastle (4th title); C. Guinnane (captain)
- Runners-up: Crusheen

The 1970 Clare Senior Hurling Championship was the 75th staging of the Clare Senior Hurling Championship since its establishment by the Clare County Board in 1887.

Newmarket-on-Fergus entered the championship as the defending champions.

The final was played on 13 September 1970 at Cusack Park in Ennis, between Clarecastle and Crusheen, in what was their first ever meeting in the final. Clarecastle won the match by 1–07 to 0–05 to claim their fourth championship title overall and a first championship title in 21 years.

== Results ==
=== Final ===
13 September 1970 Final	Clarecastle	1-07 - 0-05	Crusheen	Cusack Park
