= 1979 Clare Senior Hurling Championship =

Annual hurling competition season

- Champions: Sixmilebridge (2nd title); Mick O'Shea (captain)
- Runners-up: St Brendan's; P. J. Purcell (captain)

The 1979 Clare Senior Hurling Championship was the 84th staging of the Clare Senior Hurling Championship since its establishment by the Clare County Board in 1887.

Newmarket-on-Fergus entered the championship as the defending champions.

The final was played on 23 September 1979 at Dr Daly Memorial Park in Tulla, between Sixmilebridge and Kilkishen, in what was their first ever meeting in the final. Sixmilebridge won the match by 5–11 to 0–09 to claim their second championship title overall and a first championship title in two years.

== Results ==
=== Final ===
| 23 September 1979 Final | Sixmilebridge | 5-11 - 0-09 | St Brendan's | Dr Daly Memorial Park |
