= 1971 Clare Senior Hurling Championship =

Annual hurling competition season

- Champions: Newmarket-on-Fergus (16th title); Gus Lohan (captain)
- Runners-up: Clarecastle; Pat Moloney (captain)

The 1971 Clare Senior Hurling Championship was the 76th staging of the Clare Senior Hurling Championship since its establishment by the Clare County Board in 1887.

Clarecastle entered the championship as the defending champions.

The final, a replay, was played on 19 September 1971 at Cusack Park in Ennis, between Newmarket-on-Fergus and Clarecastle, in what was their first meeting in the final in two years. Newmarket-on-Fergus won the match by 2–07 to 1–07 to claim their 16th championship title overall and a first championship title in two years.

== Results ==
=== Final ===
29 August 1971 Final	Newmarket-on-Fergus	3-09 - 2-12	Clarecastle	Cusack Park

=== Final replay ===
19 September 1971 Final replay	Newmarket-on-Fergus	2-07 - 1-07	Clarecastle	Cusack Park
