= 2008 Clare Senior Hurling Championship =

Annual hurling competition season

- Champions: Clonlara (2nd title); Paul Collins (captain); Jim Gully (manager)
- Runners-up: Newmarket-on-Fergus; Kieran Devitt (captain)

The 2008 Clare Senior Hurling Championship was the 113th staging of the Clare Senior Hurling Championship since its establishment by the Laois County Board in 1887.

Tulla entered the championship as the defending champions.

The final was played on 26 October 2008 at Cusack Park in Ennis, between Clonlara and Newmarket-on-Fergus, in what was their first ever meeting in the final. Clonlara won the match by 1-12 to 1-09 to claim their second championship title overall and a first title in 89 years.

== Knockout stage ==
=== Quarter-finals ===
27 September 2008 Quarter-final	Newmarket-on-Fergus	1-13 - 0-15	Cratloe	O'Garney Park

27 September 2008 Quarter-final	Clonlara	1-13 - 2-09	Kilmaley	Cusack Park

28 September 2008 Quarter-final	St Joseph's Doora-Barefield	1-17 - 0-11	Inagh-Kilnamona	Cusack Park

4 October 2008 Quarter-final	Crusheen	1-10 - 0-12	Clarecastle	Cusack Park

=== Semi-finals ===
11 October 2008 Semi-final	Clonlara	1-10 - 1-10	Crusheen	Cusack Park

12 October 2008 Semi-final	Newmarket-on-Fergus	1-20 - 3-07	St Joseph's Doora-Barefield	Cusack Park

18 October 2008 Semi-final replay	Clonlara	0-13 - 0-05	Crusheen	Cusack Park

=== Final ===
26 October 2008 Final	Clonlara	1-12 - 1-09	Newmarket-on-Fergus	Cusack Park
	D Madden 0-7 (5fs), T Lynch 1-0, D Honan, J Conlan 0-2 each, N O'Connell 0-1.		P Collins 0-7 (5fs), M Murphy 1-0, S O'Brien 0-2.
