= 1949 Clare Senior Hurling Championship =

Annual hurling competition season

- Champions: Clarecastle (3rd title)
- Runners-up: Ruan

The 1949 Clare Senior Hurling Championship was the 54th staging of the Clare Senior Hurling Championship since its establishment by the Clare County Board in 1887.

Ruan entered the championship as the defending champions.

The final was played on 6 November 1949 at Cusack Park in Ennis, between Clarecastle and Ruan, in what was their second consecutive meeting in the final. Clarecastle won the match by 4–08 to 3–03 to claim their third championship title overall and a first championship title in four years.

== Results ==
=== Final ===
6 November 1949 Final	Clarecastle	4-08 - 3-03	Ruan	Cusack Park
