= 2005 Clare Senior Hurling Championship =

Annual hurling competition season

- Champions: Clarecastle (11th title); Stephen Sheedy (captain); Ger Ward (manager)
- Runners-up: Wolfe Tones; Ray Carley (captain); Pat O'Rourke (manager)

The 2005 Clare Senior Hurling Championship was the 110th staging of the Clare Senior Hurling Championship since its establishment by the Clare County Board in 1887.

Kilmaley entered the championship as the defending champions.

The final was played on 23 October 2005 at Cusack Park in Ennis, between Clarecastle and Wolfe Tones, in what was their second meeting in the final overall. Clarecastle won the match by 0–09 to 0–07 to claim their 11th championship title overall and a first title in two years.

== Results ==
=== Final ===
23 October 2005 Final	Clarecastle	0-09 - 0-07	Wolfe Tones	Cusack Park
	D Quinn 0-4 (3f), T Kearse 0-3, S Moloney, J Pyne 0-1 each.		D Reidy 0-5(3f), K McCarthy, G McPhillips 0-1 each.
