= 2010 Clare Senior Hurling Championship =

Annual hurling competition season

- Champions: Crusheen (1st title); Gerry O'Grady (captain)
- Runners-up: Cratloe; Barry Duggan (captain)

The 2010 Clare Senior Hurling Championship was the 115th staging of the Clare Senior Hurling Championship since its establishment by the Clare County Board in 1887.

Cratloe entered the championship as the defending champions.

The final was played on 17 October 2010 at Cusack Park in Ennis, between Crusheen and Cratlow, in what was their first ever meeting in the final. Crusheen won the match by 2–13 to 1–11 to claim their first ever championship title.

== Results ==
=== Final ===
17 October 2010 Final	Crusheen	2-13 - 1-11	Cratloe	Cusack Park
	P Vaughan 0-7 (0-6f, 0-1 '65), P Meaney 1-1, F Kennedy 1-0, J Meaney 0-2, C O'Doherty, C O'Donnell, G O'Grady 0-1 each.	Report	C McGrath 0-5 (0-3f), C Ryan 1-0, C McInerney 0-3, E Boyce, S Collins, S Chaplin 0-1 each.
