= 1975 Clare Senior Hurling Championship =

Annual hurling competition season

- Champions: Brian Boru's (1st title); Colm Wiley (captain)
- Runners-up: Éire Óg; Joe Barry (captain)

The 1975 Clare Senior Hurling Championship was the 80th staging of the Clare Senior Hurling Championship since its establishment by the Clare County Board in 1887.

Newmarket-on-Fergus entered the championship as the defending champions.

The final was played on 14 September 1975 at Cusack Park in Ennis, between Brian Boru's and Éire Óg, in what was their first ever meeting in the final. Brian Boru's won the match by 4–07 to 2–09 to claim their first ever championship title.

== Results ==
=== Final ===
14 September 1975 Final	Brian Boru's	4-07 - 2-09	Éire Óg	Cusack Park
