= 1994 Clare Senior Hurling Championship =

Annual hurling competition season

- Champions: Clarecastle (8th title); Anthony Daly (captain)
- Runners-up: St Joseph's D/B; Ger Hoey (captain)

The 1994 Clare Senior Hurling Championship was the 99th staging of the Clare Senior Hurling Championship since its establishment by the Clare County Board in 1887.

Sixmilebridge entered the championship as the defending champions, however, they were beaten by Clarecastle in a quarter-final replay.

The final was played on 1 October 1994 at Cusack Park in Ennis, between Clarecastle and St Joseph's Doora-Barefield, in what was their first ever meeting in the final. Clarecastle won the match by 1–08 to 0–08 to claim their eighth championship title overall and a first chamionship title in three years.

== Results ==
=== Final ===
1 October 1994 Final	Clarecastle	1-08 - 0-08	St Joseph's Doora-Barefield	Cusack Park
	G O'Loughlin 0-4, J Healy 1-1, A Neville 0-1, K Power 0-1, F Tuohy 0-1.		J O'Connor 0-4, P Collins 0-1, A Whelan 0-1, M McNamara 0-1, S McMahon 0-1.
