= 2003 Clare Senior Hurling Championship =

Annual hurling competition season

- Champions: Clarecastle (10th title); Ken Ralph (captain)
- Runners-up: Ballyea; John Griffin (captain)

The 2003 Clare Senior Hurling Championship was the 108th staging of the Clare Senior Hurling Championship since its establishment by the Clare County Board in 1887.

Sixmilebridge entered the championship as the defending champions.

The final was played on 12 October 2003 at Cusack Park in Ennis, between Clarecastle and Ballyea, in what was their first ever meeting in the final. Clarecastle won the match by 3–14 to 1–11 to claim their 10th championship title overall and a first title in six years.

== Results ==
=== Final ===
| 12 October 2003 Final | Clarecastle | 3-14 - 1-11 | Ballyea | Cusack Park |
| | K Ralph 1-9 (0-9 frees); T Kearse 1-1; S Moloney 1-0; J Clancy, C Plunkett, A Daly (free) and D Quinn 0-1 each. | | A Hehir 0-6 frees; S O'Neill 1-1 frees; D Chambers 0-2; I Kilbane and T Griffin 0-1 each. |
