= 1958 Clare Senior Hurling Championship =

Annual hurling competition season

- Champions: St Joseph's Doora-Barefield (2nd title); Matt Nugent (captain)
- Runners-up: Feakle; Dermot Sheedy (captain)

The 1958 Clare Senior Hurling Championship was the 63rd staging of the Clare Senior Hurling Championship since its establishment by the Clare County Board in 1887.

Éire Óg entered the championship as the defending champions.

The final was played on 24 August 1958 at Cusack Park in Ennis, between St Joseph's Doora-Barefield and Feakle, in what was their first meeting in a final. St Joseph's Doora-Barefield won the match by 3–06 to 2–02 to claim their second championship title overall and a first championship title in four years.

== Results ==
=== Final ===
| 24 August 1958 Final | St Joseph's Doora-Barefield | 3-06 - 2-02 | Feakle | Cusack Park |
