= 2011 Clare Senior Hurling Championship =

Annual hurling competition season

- Champions: Crusheen (2nd title); Gerry O'Grady (captain)
- Runners-up: Sixmilebridge; Niall Gilligan (captain)

The 2011 Clare Senior Hurling Championship was the 116th staging of the Clare Senior Hurling Championship since its establishment by the Clare County Board in 1887.

Crusheen entered the championship as the defending champions.

The final was played on 23 October 2011 at Cusack Park in Ennis, between Crusheen and Sixmilebridge, in what was their first ever meeting in the final. Crusheen won the match by 0–10 to 0–04 to claim their second successive championship title.

== Results ==
=== Final ===
23 October 2011 Final	Crusheen	0-10 - 0-04	Cratloe	Cusack Park
	G O’Donnell 0-3, J Fitzgibbon, P Meaney, P Vaughan (2fs) 0-2 each, F Kennedy 0-1.		N Gilligan 0-3 (1f, 0-1p), D Morey 0-1.
