= 1940 Clare Senior Hurling Championship =

Annual hurling competition season

- Champions: Feakle (4th title)
- Runners-up: Clooney

The 1940 Clare Senior Hurling Championship was the 45th staging of the Clare Senior Hurling Championship since its establishment by the Clare County Board in 1887.

Feakle entered the championship as the defending champions.

The final was played on 27 October 1940 at Cusack Park in Ennis, between Feakle and Clooney in what was their first ever meeting in the final. Feakle won the match by 3–04 to 2–03 to claim their fourth championship title overall and a third championship title in succession.

== Results ==
=== Final ===
27 October 1940 Final	Feakle	3-04 - 2-03	Clooney	Cusack Park
