= 1926 Clare Senior Hurling Championship =

Annual hurling competition season

- Champions: Newmarket-on-Fergus (4th title); Mick Doherty (captain)
- Runners-up: O'Callaghan's Mills

The 1926 Clare Senior Hurling Championship was the 31st staging of the Clare Senior Hurling Championship since its establishment by the Clare County Board in 1887.

Newmarket-on-Fergus entered the championship as the defending champions.

The final was played on 10 October 1926 at the Showgrounds in Ennis, between Newmarket-on-Fergus and O'Callaghan's Mills. Newmarket-on-Fergus won the match by 3–05 to 2–03 to claim their fourth championship title overall and a second championship title in succession.

== Results ==
=== Final ===
10 October 1926 Final	Newmarket-on-Fergus	3-05 - 2-03	O'Callaghan's Mills	Ennis Showgrounds
