= Enda Barrett =

Irish hurler

Personal information
- Native name: Enda de Bairéid (Irish)
- Born: 2 February 1987 (age 39) Newmarket-on-Fergus, County Clare, Ireland
- Occupation: Student

Sport
- Sport: Hurling
- Position: Left wing-forward
Club
- Years: Club
- Newmarket-on-Fergus
Club titles
- Clare titles: 1
College
- Years: College
- NUI Galway
Inter-county*
Years	County	Apps (scores)
2009-present	Clare	1 (0-00)
Inter-county titles
- Munster titles: 0
- All-Irelands: 0
- NHL: 0
- All Stars: 0
- *Inter County team apps and scores correct as of 21:14, 30 January 2013.

Enda Barrett (born 2 February 1987) is an Irish hurler who currently plays as a left wing-forward for the Clare senior team.

Barrett made his first appearance for the team during the 2009 National League, however, he failed to make an immediate impact on the team. Since then however, he has won one National League (Division 1B) medal.

At club level Barrett is a one-time county club championship medalist with Newmarket-on-Fergus.

Barrett played for NUI Galway in the Fitzgibbon Cup, and was part of the team that lost the 2007 final.
