= 1972 Clare Senior Hurling Championship =

Annual hurling competition season

- Champions: Newmarket-on-Fergus (17th title); Jimmy McNamara (captain)
- Runners-up: St Senan's; Dan Teefy (captain)

The 1972 Clare Senior Hurling Championship was the 77th staging of the Clare Senior Hurling Championship since its establishment by the Clare County Board in 1887.

Newmarket-on-Fergus entered the championship as the defending champions.

The final was played on 29 October 1972 at Cusack Park in Ennis, between Newmarket-on-Fergus and St Senan's, in what was their first ever meeting in the final. Newmarket-on-Fergus won the match by 7–08 to 3–05 to claim their 17th championship title overall and a second championship title in succession.

== Results ==
=== Final ===
29 October 1972 Final	Newmarket-on-Fergus	7-08 - 3-05	St Senan's	Cusack Park
