= 1930 Clare Senior Hurling Championship =

Annual hurling competition season

- Champions: Newmarket-on-Fergus (6th title); Mick Doherty (captain)
- Runners-up: Ennis Dalcassians

The 1930 Clare Senior Hurling Championship was the 35th staging of the Clare Senior Hurling Championship since its establishment by the Clare County Board in 1887.

Ennis Dalcassians entered the championship as the defending champions.

The final was played on 7 September 1930 at the Showgrounds in Ennis, between Newmarket-on-Fergus and Ennis Dalcassians, in what was their fourth consecutive meeting in the final. Newmarket-on-Fergus won the match by 6–03 to 3–03 to claim their sixth championship title overall and a first championship title in three years.

== Results ==
=== Final ===
7 September 1930 Final	Newmarket-on-Fergus	6-03 - 3-03	Ennis Dalcassians	Ennis Showgrounds
