= 1964 Clare Senior Hurling Championship =

Annual hurling competition season

- Champions: Newmarket-on-Fergus (11th title); Ger Buddy McMahon (captain)
- Runners-up: Clarecastle

The 1964 Clare Senior Hurling Championship was the 69th staging of the Clare Senior Hurling Championship since its establishment by the Clare County Board in 1887.

Newmarket-on-Fergus entered the championship as the defending champions.

The final was played on 20 September 1964 at Cusack Park in Ennis, between Newmarket-on-Fergus and Clarecastle, in what was their second meeting in the final overall. Newmarket-on-Fergus won the match by 8–12 to 5–07 to claim their 11th championship title overall and a second championship title in succession.

== Results ==
=== Final ===
20 September 1964 Final	Newmarket-on-Fergus	8-12 - 5-07	Clarecastle	Cusack Park
