= 1960 Clare Senior Hurling Championship =

Annual hurling competition season

- Champions: Ruan (4th title)
- Runners-up: Scariff

The 1960 Clare Senior Hurling Championship was the 65th staging of the Clare Senior Hurling Championship since its establishment by the Clare County Board in 1887.

Ruan entered the championship as the defending champions.

The final was played on 28 August 1960 at Cusack Park in Ennis, between Ruan and Scariff, in what was their first ever meeting in the final. Ruan won the match by 6–09 to 3–10 to claim their fourth championship title overall and a second championship title in succession.

== Results ==
=== Final ===
28 August 1960 Final	Ruan	6-09 - 3-10	Scariff	Cusack Park
