= 1969 Clare Senior Hurling Championship =

Annual hurling competition season

- Champions: Newmarket-on-Fergus (15th title); M. Arthurs (captain)
- Runners-up: Clarecastle; P. Talty (captain)

The 1969 Clare Senior Hurling Championship was the 74th staging of the Clare Senior Hurling Championship since its establishment by the Clare County Board in 1887.

Newmarket-on-Fergus entered the championship as the defending champions.

The final, a replay, was played on 31 August 1969 at Cusack Park in Ennis, between Newmarket-on-Fergus and Clarecastle, in what was their third consecutive meeting in the final. Newmarket-on-Fergus won the match by 9–13 to 3–06 to claim their 15th championship title overall and a third championship title in succession.

== Results ==
=== Final ===
17 August 1969 Final	Newmarket-on-Fergus	3-05 - 2-08	Clarecastle	Cusack Park

=== Final replay ===
31 August 1969 Final replay	Newmarket-on-Fergus	9-13 - 3-06	Clarecastle	Cusack Park
