= 1984 Clare Senior Hurling Championship =

Annual hurling competition season

- Champions: Sixmilebridge (4th title); Seán Stack (captain)
- Runners-up: Clarecastle; Tom Howard (captain)

The 1984 Clare Senior Hurling Championship was the 89th staging of the Clare Senior Hurling Championship since its establishment by the Clare County Board in 1887.

Sixmilebridge entered the championship as the defending champions.

The final was played on 16 September 1984 at Cusack Park in Ennis, between Sixmilebridge and Éire Óg, in what was their first ever meeting in the final. Sixmilebridge won the match by 3–07 to 1–12 to claim their fourth championship title overall and a second consecutive championship title.

== Results ==
=== Final ===
| 16 September 1984 Final | Sixmilebridge | 3-07 - 1-12 | Clarecastle | Cusack Park |
