= 1965 Clare Senior Hurling Championship =

Annual hurling competition season

- Champions: Newmarket-on-Fergus (12th title); Jim Cullinan (captain)
- Runners-up: Éire Óg

The 1965 Clare Senior Hurling Championship was the 70th staging of the Clare Senior Hurling Championship since its establishment by the Clare County Board in 1887.

Newmarket-on-Fergus entered the championship as the defending champions.

The final was played on 29 August 1965 at Cusack Park in Ennis, between Newmarket-on-Fergus and Éire Óg, in what was their second meeting in the final overall. Newmarket-on-Fergus won the match by 2–06 to 1–06 to claim their 12th championship title overall and a third championship title in succession.

== Results ==
=== Final ===
29 August 1965 Final	Éire Óg	2-06 - 1-06	Éire Óg	Cusack Park
