= 1954 Clare Senior Hurling Championship =

Annual hurling competition season

- Champions: St Joseph's Doora-Barefield (1st title)
- Runners-up: O'Callaghan's Mills

The 1954 Clare Senior Hurling Championship was the 59th staging of the Clare Senior Hurling Championship since its establishment by the Clare County Board in 1887.

Scariff entered the championship as the defending champions.

The final was played on 4 October 1954 at Cusack Park in Ennis, between St Joseph's Doora-Barefield and O'Callaghan's Mills, in what was their first ever meeting in the final. St Joseph's Doora-Barefield won the match by 3–06 to 2–07 to claim their first ever championship title.

== Results ==
=== Final ===
| 4 October 1954 Final | St Joseph's Doora-Barefield | 5-02 - 2-07 | O'Callaghan's Mills | Cusack Park |
