= 1974 Clare Senior Hurling Championship =

Annual hurling competition season

- Champions: Newmarket-on-Fergus (19th title); Pat O'Leary (captain)
- Runners-up: Crusheen; Michael Moroney (captain)

The 1974 Clare Senior Hurling Championship was the 79th staging of the Clare Senior Hurling Championship since its establishment by the Clare County Board in 1887.

Newmarket-on-Fergus entered the championship as the defending champions.

The final was played on 6 October 1974 at Cusack Park in Ennis, between Newmarket-on-Fergus and Crusheen, in what was their first ever meeting in the final. Newmarket-on-Fergus won the match by 1–06 to 2–02 to claim their 19th championship title overall and a record fourth championship title in succession.

== Results ==
=== Final ===
| 6 October 1974 Final | Newmarket-on-Fergus | 1-06 - 2-02 | Crusheen | Cusack Park |
