= 1948 Clare Senior Hurling Championship =

Annual hurling competition season

- Champions: Ruan (1st title)
- Runners-up: Clarecastle

The 1948 Clare Senior Hurling Championship was the 53rd staging of the Clare Senior Hurling Championship since its establishment by the Clare County Board in 1887.

Bodyke entered the championship as the defending champions.

The final was played on 3 October 1948 at Cusack Park in Ennis, between Ruan and Clarecastle, in what was their first ever meeting in the final. Ruan won the match by 7–04 to 5–07 to claim their first ever championship title.

== Results ==
=== Final ===
3 October 1948 Final	Ruan	7-04 - 5-07	Clarecastle	Cusack Park
