= Alan Markham =

Irish hurler

Personal information
- Native name: Ailéin Ó Marcacháin (Irish)
- Nickname: popyeye
- Born: 11/7/1979 Connolly
- Occupation: carpenter

Sport
- Sport: Hurling
- Position: Left Half Forward
Club
- Years: Club
- Kilmaley
Club titles
- Clare titles: Clare
Inter-county
Years	County	Apps (scores)
1998-2010	Clare	? (10-34)
Inter-county titles
- Munster titles: 1

Alan Markham is an Irish sportsperson. He plays hurling with his local club Kilmaley and was a former member of the Clare senior inter-county team.
