= 1977 Clare Senior Hurling Championship =

Annual hurling competition season

- Champions: Sixmilebridge (1st title); Seán Stack (captain)
- Runners-up: Kilkishen; Seán Hehir (captain)

The 1977 Clare Senior Hurling Championship was the 82nd staging of the Clare Senior Hurling Championship since its establishment by the Clare County Board in 1887.

Newmarket-on-Fergus entered the championship as the defending champions.

The final was played on 2 October 1977 at Dr Daly Memorial Park in Tulla, between Sixmilebridge and Kilkishen, in what was their first ever meeting in the final. Sixmilebridge won the match by 1–06 to 1–05 to claim their first ever championship title.

== Results ==
=== Final ===
2 October 1977 Final	Sixmilebridge	1-06 - 1-05	Kilkishen	Dr Daly Memorial Park
