= 1985 Clare Senior Hurling Championship =

Annual hurling competition season

- Champions: Kilmaley (1st title); P. J. Kennedy (captain)
- Runners-up: Éire Óg; Seán Heaslip (captain)

The 1985 Clare Senior Hurling Championship was the 90th staging of the Clare Senior Hurling Championship since its establishment by the Clare County Board in 1887.

Sixmilebridge entered the championship as the defending champions, however, they were beaten by Kilmaley in the semi-finals.

The final was played on 8 September 1985 at Cusack Park in Ennis, between Kilmaley and Éire Óg, in what was their first ever meeting in the final. Kilmaley won the match by 0–10 to 0–08 to claim their first ever championship title.

== Results ==
=== Final ===
8 September 1985 Final	Kilmaley	0-10 - 0-08	Éire Óg	Cusack Park
