= 1942 Clare Senior Hurling Championship =

Annual hurling competition season

- Champions: Clooney (1st title); Paddy McNamara (captain)
- Runners-up: Scariff

The 1942 Clare Senior Hurling Championship was the 47th staging of the Clare Senior Hurling Championship since its establishment by the Clare County Board in 1887.

Ennis Dalcassians entered the championship as the defending champions.

The final was played on 11 October 1942 at Cusack Park in Ennis, between Clooney and Scariff in what was their first ever meeting in the final. Clooney won the match by 4–06 to 4–05 to claim their first ever championship title.

== Results ==
=== Final ===
11 October 1942 Final	Clooney	4-06 - 4-05	Scariff	Cusack Park
