= Séamus Durack =

Irish hurler and manager

Personal information
- Native name: Séamus Ó Dúraic (Irish)
- Born: 1951 (age 74–75) Feakle, County Clare, Ireland

Sport
- Sport: Hurling
- Position: Goalkeeper
Clubs
- Years: Club
- Feakle; Éire Óg, Ennis
Club titles
- Clare titles: 2
Inter-county
Years	County	Apps (scores)
1971-1983	Clare	23 (0-00)
Inter-county titles
- Munster titles: 0
- All-Irelands: 0
- NHL: 2
- All Stars: 3

Séamus Durack (born 1951) is an Irish former hurler and manager who played as a goalkeeper for the Clare senior team.

Durack made his first appearance for the team during the 1971 championship and was a regular member of the starting fifteen until his retirement after the 1983 championship. During that time he won two National League winner's medals and three All-Star awards, however, championship honours eluded him during his career.

At club level Durack is a two-time county club championship medalist with the Éire Óg club. He began his career with Feakle.

In retirement Durack became involved in coaching. He served one stint as manager of the Clare senior hurling team before later managing the Newmarket-on-Fergus club team.
