= Christy Chaplin =

Irish hurler (born 1971)

Personal information
- Nickname: Rusty
- Born: 11 December 1971 (age 54) Sixmilebridge, County Clare, Ireland

Sport
- Sport: Hurling
- Position: Midfield
Club
- Years: Club
- Sixmilebridge
Club titles
- Clare titles: 6
- Munster titles: 2
- All-Ireland Titles: 1
Inter-county
- Years: County
- 1994–1998: Clare
Inter-county titles
- Munster titles: 3
- All-Irelands: 2
- NHL: 0
- All Stars: 0

Christopher Chaplin (born 11 December 1971) is an Irish hurling coach and former player. At club level he played with Sixmilebridge and at inter-county level with the Clare senior hurling team. Chaplin later served as a manager and selector.

== Playing career ==
Chaplin first played hurling to a high standard as a schoolboy at Shannon Comprehensive School. He was part of the school team beaten by St Flannan's College in an all-Clare Harty Cup final in 1989. Chaplin also enjoyed his first club success that year when Sixmilebridge claimed the Clare SHC title. It was the first of six titles in that competition, including two as team captain. Chaplin was also part of the Sixmilebridge team that beat Dunloy in the 1996 All-Ireland club final.

Chaplin made his inter-county debut with Clare as a member of the minor team that lost to Offaly in the 1989 All-Ireland MHC final. He later progressed to the under-21 team, with his last game in that grade being the 1992 Munster under-21 HC final by Waterford. As part of the Clare junior team, Chaplin won an All-Ireland JHC medal in 1993 after a defeat of Kilkenny in the final.

Chaplin made the step up to the senior team in 1994. He was part of the Clare team that bridged a 63-year gap to win the Munster SHC title in 1995. Chaplin later claimed an All-Ireland SHC medal as a substitute after Clare beat Offaly to claim the title for the first time in 81 years. Chaplin won a second Munster SHC title in 1997, before claiming a second All-Ireland SHC winners' medal from the substitutes' bench after a defeat of Tipperary in the 1997 All-Ireland SHC final. He won a third Munster SHC medal in four seasons in 1998.

== Coaching career ==
In retirement from playing, Chaplin became involved in team management and coaching. He was manager of the Sixmilebridge senior team that was beaten by Crusheen in the 2011 Clare SHC final.

== Honours ==
Sixmilebridge

- All-Ireland Senior Club Hurling Championship: 1996
- Munster Senior Club Hurling Championship: 1995, 2000
- Clare Senior Hurling Championship: 1989, 1992, 1993, 1995, 2000 (c), 2002 (c)

Clare

- All-Ireland Senior Hurling Championship: 1995, 1997
- Munster Senior Hurling Championship: 1995, 1997
- All-Ireland Junior Hurling Championship: 1993
- Munster Junior Hurling Championship: 1993
- Munster Minor Hurling Championship: 1989
