= Gerry McInerney (Clare hurler) =

Irish hurler

Personal information
- Native name: Gearóid Mac an Oirchinnigh (Irish)
- Born: Sixmilebridge, County Clare

Sport
- Sport: Hurling
- Position: Left corner-forward
Club
- Years: Club
- 1978-1996: Sixmilebridge
Club titles
- Clare titles: 7
- Munster titles: 2
- All-Ireland Titles: 1
Inter-county
- Years: County
- 1980-1991: Clare
Inter-county titles
- Munster titles: 0
- All-Irelands: 0
- NHL: 0
- All Stars: 0

Gerry McInerney (born 1961 in Sixmilebridge, County Clare) is an Irish sportsperson. He plays hurling with his local club Sixmilebridge and was a member of the Clare senior inter-county team from 1980 until 1991.

Sporting positions
Preceded by James Shanahan	Clare Senior Hurling Captain; 1989-1990	Succeeded by John O'Connell
