= 1987 Clare Senior Hurling Championship =

Annual hurling competition season

- Champions: Sixmilebridge (6th title); Anthony Scanlan (captain)
- Runners-up: Feakle; Ger McNamara (captain)

The 1987 Clare Senior Hurling Championship was the 92nd staging of the Clare Senior Hurling Championship since its establishment by the Clare County Board in 1887.

Clarecastle entered the championship as the defending champions.

The final was played on 27 September 1987 at Cusack Park in Ennis, between Clarecastle and Feakle, in what was their second meeting in the final overall. Clarecastle won the match by 0–15 to 0–11 to claim their sixth championship title overall and a second championship title in succession.

== Results ==
=== Final ===
27 September 1987 Final	Clarecastle	0-15 - 0-11	Feakle	Cusack Park
