= 1999 Clare Senior Hurling Championship =

Annual hurling competition season

- Teams: 13
- Sponsor: Auburn Lodge
- Champions: St Joseph's Doora-Barefield (4th title); Lorcan Hassett (captain); Michael Clohessy (manager)
- Runners-up: Sixmilebridge; Christy Chaplin (captain); Paddy Meehan (manager)

The 1999 Clare Senior Hurling Championship was the 104th staging of the Clare Senior Hurling Championship since its establishment by the Clare County Board in 1887. The championship draw was made on 10 May 1999.

St Joseph's Doora-Barefield entered the championship as the defending champions.

The final was played on 24 October 1999 at Hennessy Memorial Park in Milltown Malbay, between St Joseph's Doora-Barefield and Sixmilebridge, in what was their first ever meeting in the final. St Joseph's Doora-Barefield won the match by 3–12 to 1–12 to claim their fourth championship title overall and a second title in succession.

== Results ==
=== Final ===
24 October 1999 Final	St Joseph's Doora-Barefield	3-12 - 1-12	Sixmilebridge	Hennessy Memorial Park

== Championship statistics ==
=== Miscellaneous ===
- The championship draw was made on local radio for the first time ever.
