= 1993 Clare Senior Hurling Championship =

Annual hurling competition season

- Champions: Sixmilebridge (7th title); John Chaplin (captain); Liam O'Donoghue (manager)
- Runners-up: O'Callaghan's Mills; Mike Deasy (captain); Pat Tierney (manager)

The 1993 Clare Senior Hurling Championship was the 98th staging of the Clare Senior Hurling Championship since its establishment by the Clare County Board in 1887.

Sixmilebridge entered the championship as the defending champions.

The final was played on 3 October 1993 at Cusack Park in Ennis, between Sixmilebridge and O'Callaghan's Mills, in what was their first ever meeting in the final. Sixmilebridge won the match by 3–08 to 2–06 to claim their seventh championship title overall and a second consecutive title.

== Results ==
=== Final ===
3 October 1993 Final	Sixmilebridge	3-08 - 2-06	O'Callaghan's Mills	Cusack Park
	E Healy 1-2, F Quilligan 1-1, J Chaplin 1-0, C Chaplin 0-2, G McInerney 0-2, J O'Connell 0-1.		PJ O'Connell 2-0, B McNamara 0-2, M Deasy 0-1, B Madden 0-1, D Cooney 0-1, B Noonan 0-1.
