= 1943 Clare Senior Hurling Championship =

Annual hurling competition season

- Champions: Clarecastle (5th title)
- Runners-up: Scariff

The 1943 Clare Senior Hurling Championship was the 48th staging of the Clare Senior Hurling Championship since its establishment by the Clare County Board in 1887.

Clooney entered the championship as the defending champions.

The final was played on 3 October 1943 at Cusack Park in Ennis, between Clarecastle and Scariff in what was their first ever meeting in the final. Clarecastle won the match by 4–03 to 4–02 to claim their first ever championship title.

== Results ==
=== Final ===
3 October 1943 Final	Clarecastle	4-03 - 4-02	Scariff	Cusack Park
