= 1912 Clare Senior Hurling Championship =

Annual hurling competition season

- Champions: Newmarket-on-Fergus (1st title); Tommy Doherty (captain)
- Runners-up: Tulla

The 1912 Clare Senior Hurling Championship was the 20th staging of the Clare Senior Hurling Championship since its establishment by the Clare County Board in 1887.

Ennis Dalcassians entered the championship as the defending champions.

The final was played on 6 July 1912 at the Showgrounds in Ennis, between Newmarket-on-Fergus and Tulla. Newmarket-on-Fergus won the match by 3–03 to 3–01 to claim their first ever championship title.

== Results ==
=== Final ===
6 July 1912 Final	Newmarket-on-Fergus	3-03 - 3-01	Tulla	Ennis Showgrounds
