= 1935 Clare Senior Hurling Championship =

Annual hurling competition season

- Champions: Feakle (1st title)
- Runners-up: Newmarket-on-Fergus

The 1935 Clare Senior Hurling Championship was the 40th staging of the Clare Senior Hurling Championship since its establishment by the Clare County Board in 1887.

Ennis Dalcassians entered the championship as the defending champions.

The final was played on 13 October 1935 at Cusack Park in Ennis, between Feakle and Newmarket-on-Fergus. Feakle won the match by 6–01 to 2–03 to claim their first ever championship title.

== Results ==
=== Final ===
13 October 1935 Final	Feakle	6-01 - 2-03	Newmarket-on-Fergus	Cusack Park
