= Clare Senior Hurling Championship =

Sports competition in Ireland

- Current season or competition: 2026 Clare Senior Hurling Championship
- Irish: Craobh Sinsearach Iomána an Chláir
- Code: Hurling
- Founded: 1887
- Region: Clare (GAA)
- Trophy: Canon Hamilton Cup
- No. of teams: 16
- Title holders: Inagh-Kilnamona (4th title)
- Most titles: Newmarket-on-Fergus (23 titles)
- Sponsors: TUS Midlands Midwest
- Motto: There is no hero like a local hero
- Official website: clare.gaa.ie

The Clare Senior Hurling Championship (abbreviated to Clare SHC) is an annual GAA club competition organised by the Clare County Board for the top sixteen hurling clubs in County Clare, Ireland. It is the most prestigious competition in Clare hurling. The Clare SHC final is usually held in the month of October at Cusack Park in Ennis.

The Clare SHC and Clare SFC begin once both the Clare hurling team and Clare football team have concluded their respective inter-county campaigns. Both championships run concurrently on opposite weekends to cater for dual clubs competing in both codes.

In 2012 the Clare County Board decided that from 2014 onwards the Clare SHC would become a sixteen-team competition. This meant that five clubs would lose their senior status and be relegated down to the second-tier intermediate level. However, due to the overwhelming success of both the Clare Senior and Under-21 inter-county squads in 2013, this decision was postponed for twelve months. 2014 saw the relegation of Broadford, Doora-Barefield, Ruan, Scariff and Wolfe Tones down to intermediate for 2015.

The winners of the Clare SHC each year are presented with the Canon Hamilton Cup, and represent Clare in the Munster Senior Club Hurling Championship and possibly the All-Ireland Senior Club Hurling Championship as the Clare champions.

The current (2026) champions and holders of the Canon Hamilton Cup are Inagh-Kilnamona who defeated their neighbours Kilmaley by 2–18 to 1–14 at Zimmer Biomet Páirc Chíosóg in Ennis, to win their first title as a combined club and their fourth including the three of Kilnamona.

== Munster & All-Ireland club qualification ==
=== Munster club championship ===
Six Clare clubs have won the Munster Senior Club Hurling Championship:

- Newmarket-on-Fergus won back-to-back Munster senior club titles in 1967 and 1968, beating Carrick Davins (Tipperary) and Ballygunner (Waterford) respectively. They reached three further finals in six years, but lost to Blackrock (Cork) in both 1973 and 1978, and to St. Finbarr's (Cork) in 1974.
- Having lost the 1977 final after a replay to St. Finbarr's (Cork), Sixmilebridge won the 1984 Munster senior club title, beating Patrickswell (Limerick) in the final. They lost to Castlegar (Galway) in the All-Ireland senior club semi-final. They lost the 1989, 1992, and 1993 finals to Ballybrown (Limerick), Kilmallock (Limerick) and Toomevara (Tipperary) respectively. Sixmilebridge won their second Munster senior club title in 1995, beating Nenagh Éire Óg (Tipperary) in the final. They beat Sarsfields (Galway) on their way to the 1996 All-Ireland senior club final. Sixmilebridge won their third Munster senior club title in 2000, beating Mount Sion (Waterford) in the final. After beating Fr. Murphy's (London) in the All-Ireland senior club quarter-final, they lost to Graigue-Ballycallan (Kilkenny) in the All-Ireland senior club semi-final after a replay. They lost the 2002 and 2013 finals to Mount Sion (Waterford) and Na Piarsaigh (Limerick) respectively.
- Wolfe Tones won the 1996 Munster senior club title, beating Ballygunner (Waterford) in the final. They beat Ruairí Óg (Antrim) on their way to the 1997 All-Ireland senior club final.
- Having lost the 1970 and 1986 finals to Roscrea (Tipperary) and Borris-Ileigh (Tipperary) respectively, Clarecastle won the 1997 Munster senior club title, beating Patrickswell (Limerick) in the final. After beating St. Gabriel's (London) in the All-Ireland senior club quarter-final, they lost to Birr (Offaly) in the All-Ireland senior club semi-final replay after extra-time.
- Doora-Barefield won back-to-back Munster senior club titles in 1998 and 1999, beating Toomevara (Tipperary) and Ballygunner (Waterford) respectively. They beat Athenry (Galway) on their way to the 1999 All-Ireland senior club final, and Ruairí Óg (Antrim) on their way to the 2000 All-Ireland senior club final.
- Ballyea won the 2016 Munster senior club title, beating Glen Rovers (Cork) in the final. They beat St. Thomas' (Galway) on their way to the 2017 All-Ireland senior club final. They lost the 2022 final to Ballygunner (Waterford).

Five more Clare clubs have reached the Munster senior club final:

- Éire Óg lost the 1990 and 2025 finals to Patrickswell (Limerick) and Ballygunner (Waterford) respectively.
- Tulla lost the 2007 final to Loughmore-Castleiney (Tipperary).
- Crusheen lost the 2011 final after a replay to Na Piarsaigh (Limerick).
- Cratloe lost the 2014 final to Kilmallock (Limerick).
- Clonlara lost the 2023 final to Ballygunner (Waterford).

=== All-Ireland club championship ===
Two Clare clubs have won the All-Ireland Senior Club Hurling Championship:

- Sixmilebridge won the 1996 All-Ireland senior club title, beating Dunloy (Antrim) in the final at Croke Park, Dublin.
- Doora-Barefield won the 1999 All-Ireland senior club title, beating Rathnure St. Anne's (Wexford) in the final at Croke Park, Dublin. They were denied back-to-back All-Ireland titles when they lost the 2000 final to Athenry (Galway) at Croke Park, Dublin.

Two more Clare clubs have reached the All-Ireland senior club final:

- Wolfe Tones lost the 1997 final to Athenry (Galway) at Croke Park, Dublin.
- Ballyea lost the 2017 final to Cuala (Dublin) at Croke Park, Dublin.

== History ==
=== Early beginnings (1887–1919) ===
Following the foundation of the GAA in 1884, new rules for gaelic football and hurling were drawn up and published in the United Irishman newspaper. Over the next three years, county committees were established, with the Clare County Board holding their inaugural meeting on 14 February 1887. The inaugural Clare SHC in 1887, saw twenty-two clubs competing, with Smith O'Brien's claiming their first and only title. Since then, the title has been awarded every year except on nine occasions. No championship took place for a five-year period from 1891 to 1895, or in 1901. The early years of the championship were dominated by Tulla winning eight titles, two of which were won by Carahan, to complete a historic five-in-a-row (1896–1900). O'Callaghan's Mills (5), Ennis Dalcassians (4), Kilnamona (3), Newmarket-on-Fergus (2), and Scariff (2) were the only other teams to win multiple titles before the championship was suspended from 1920 to 1922 due to civil unrest during the Irish War of Independence.

=== Post war of independence (1923–2000) ===
Newmarket-on-Fergus (5) and Ennis Dalcassians (4) dominated the period from 1924 to 1934, winning nine titles between them. Feakle claimed five of the ten titles on offer from 1935to 1944, including a three-in-a-row (1938–1940). The Jimmy Smyth-inspired Ruan won five titles between 1948 and 1962. The next twenty years was again dominated by Newmarket-on-Fergus who won thirteen titles between 1963 and 1981, including two three-in-a-rows (1963–1965 & 1967–1969), and a historic four-in-a-row (1971–1974). No other club has won more than back-to-back titles since. The remainder of the 20th century saw Sixmilebridge (6) and Clarecastle (5) win eleven titles between them. From 1995 to 2000 the Clare champions went on to win six consecutive Munster Senior Club Hurling Championships (Clarecastle, Sixmilebridge (2), Doora-Barefield (2) and Wolfe Tones), and two All-Ireland Senior Club Hurling Championships (Sixmilebridge in 1996 and Doora-Barefield in 1999).

=== 21st century (2001–Present) ===
In 2007 Tulla ended a seventy-four year wait to win their first title since 1933. In 2008 Clonlara bridged an eighty-nine-year gap from 1919 when they won their second county title. Since 2009 there has been three first-time champions (Ballyea, Cratloe and Crusheen) who have all gone on to win multiple titles since their maiden titles. In 2012 Newmarket-on-Fergus won their first title in thirty-one years to cement their place at the top of the Clare SHC Roll of Honour with twenty-three titles. In 2014 Cratloe completed a historic first Clare Senior Championship "Double" for their club, and the first in Clare for eighty-five years. Ballyea (4) and Sixmilebridge (4) shared every title from 2015 to 2022, but never met in the county final in that time. Ballyea also won the Munster Senior Club Hurling Championship after their maiden county title in 2016. In 2023 Feakle ended a thirty-six year wait to win their first title since 1944. In 2025 Éire Óg bridged an thirty-five-year gap from 1990 to win their sixteenth title, and helped the club to complete a historic first Clare Senior Championship "Double" for the town of Ennis since 1929.

== 2026 Senior clubs ==
The sixteen teams competing in the 2026 Clare Senior Hurling Championship are:

| Club | Location | Colours | Titles | Last title |
|---|---|---|---|---|
| Ballyea | Ballyea | Black & Amber | 4 | 2022 |
| Broadford | Broadford | Green & Yellow | 0 | – |
| Clonlara | Clonlara | Amber & Black | 3 | 2023 |
| Clooney-Quin | Clooney / Quin | Green & Red | 1 | 1942 |
| Cratloe | Cratloe | Blue & White | 2 | 2014 |
| Crusheen | Crusheen | Red & White | 2 | 2011 |
| Éire Óg, Ennis | Ennis | Red & White | 16 | 2025 |
| Feakle | Feakle | Yellow & Green | 7 | 2024 |
| Inagh-Kilnamona | Inagh / Kilnamona | Yellow & Green | 4 | 2026 |
| Kilmaley | Kilmaley | Blue & White | 2 | 2004 |
| Newmarket-on-Fergus | Newmarket-on-Fergus | Blue & Gold | 23 | 2012 |
| O'Callaghan's Mills | O'Callaghan's Mills | Green & Yellow | 8 | 1937 |
| Scariff | Scariff | Green & White | 5 | 1953 |
| Sixmilebridge | Sixmilebridge | Saffron & Blue | 15 | 2020 |
| St. Josephs, Doora-Barefield | Doora / Barefield | Maroon & White | 5 | 2001 |
| Wolfe Tones Na Sionna | Shannon | Green & White | 2 | 2006 |

== Venues ==
=== Early rounds ===
Fixtures in the opening rounds of the championship are usually played at a neutral venue that is deemed halfway between the participating teams. Some of the more common venues include Broadford GAA Grounds, Clarecastle GAA Grounds, Fr. Murphy Memorial Park, Gurteen, O'Garney Park, Páirc an Dálaigh and Wolfe Tones GAA Grounds. Cusack Park in Ennis also hosts several double-headers in the early rounds of the championship.

=== Later stages ===
The semi-finals and final are usually played at Cusack Park in Ennis. Named after the founder of the GAA, Michael Cusack, the ground has a capacity of just over 20,000. In 2017 a major renovation of the stadium was completed which included the demolition and re-erection of the main stand and construction of a new entrance at the north side of the stadium.

== Winning managers since 1990 ==
| Manager | Club | Wins | Years won |
|---|---|---|---|
| Michael Clohessy | St. Joseph's, Doora-Barefield | 3 | 1998, 1999, 2001 |
| John O'Meara | Sixmilebridge | 3 | 2013, 2015, 2017 |
| Robbie Hogan | Ballyea | 3 | 2016, 2021, 2022 |
| Paddy Meehan | Sixmilebridge | 2 | 2000, 2002 |
| Michael Browne | Crusheen | 2 | 2010, 2011 |
| Tim Crowe | Sixmilebridge | 2 | 2019, 2020 |
| Martin McKeogh | Éire Óg, Ennis | 1 | 1990 |
| Oliver Plunkett | Clarecastle | 1 | 1991 |
| Christy Murray | Sixmilebridge | 1 | 1992 |
| Liam O’Donoghue | Sixmilebridge | 1 | 1993 |
| Bernie Ryan | Clarecastle | 1 | 1994 |
| Jim Fawl | Sixmilebridge | 1 | 1995 |
| Alan Cunningham | Wolfe Tones, Shannon | 1 | 1996 |
| Roger McMahon | Clarecastle | 1 | 1997 |
| Tommy Howard | Clarecastle | 1 | 2003 |
| John Carmody | Kilmaley | 1 | 2004 |
| Ger O'Loughlin | Clarecastle | 1 | 2005 |
| Pat O'Rourke | Wolfe Tones, Shannon | 1 | 2006 |
| Jim McInerney | Tulla | 1 | 2007 |
| Jim Gully | Clonlara | 1 | 2008 |
| Mike Deegan | Cratloe | 1 | 2009 |
| Bob Enright | Newmarket-on-Fergus | 1 | 2012 |
| Joe McGrath | Cratloe | 1 | 2014 |
| Kevin Sheehan | Ballyea | 1 | 2018 |
| Donal Madden | Clonlara | 1 | 2023 |
| Ger Conway | Feakle | 1 | 2024 |
| Gerry O'Connor | Éire Óg, Ennis | 1 | 2025 |
| Eugene Cullinan | Inagh-Kilnamona | 1 | 2026 |

== Trophy ==
The winning team is presented with the Canon Hamilton Cup. A native of Clonlara, Michael Hamilton (1894–1969) was educated at Clonlara National School and St. Flannan's College in Ennis. He was ordained to the priesthood at Maynooth University in 1919 and later became a professor at St. Flannan's College. In 1922 he became one of the first chaplains in the Irish Army. He was a noted hurler in his youth and was chairman of the Clare County Board for over twenty-five years. He died while attending the Newmarket-on-Fergus and Clarecastle county final replay on 31 August 1969.

== Roll of honour ==
| # | Club | Wins | Years won |
|---|---|---|---|
| 1. | Newmarket-on-Fergus | 23 | 1912, 1916, 1925, 1926, 1927, 1930, 1931, 1936, 1955, 1963, 1964, 1965, 1967, 1968, 1969, 1971, 1972, 1973, 1974, 1976, 1978, 1981, 2012 |
| 2. | Éire Óg, Ennis | 16 | 1956, 1957, 1966, 1980, 1982, 1990, 2025: As Ennis Faughs: 1890; As Ennis Dalcassians: 1911, 1914, 1915, 1924, 1928 (with Clarecastle), 1929, 1934, 1941 |
| 3. | Sixmilebridge | 15 | 1977, 1979, 1983, 1984, 1989, 1992, 1993, 1995, 2000, 2002, 2013, 2015, 2017, 2019, 2020 |
| 4. | Clarecastle | 12 | 1928 (with Ennis Dalcassians), 1943, 1945, 1949, 1970, 1986, 1987, 1991, 1994, 1997, 2003, 2005 |
| 5. | Tulla | 11 | 1889, 1896, 1897, 1898 (as Carrahan), 1899, 1900 (as Carrahan), 1905, 1913, 1933, 1975 (as Brian Boru's), 2007 |
| 6. | O'Callaghan's Mills | 8 | 1904, 1906, 1909, 1910, 1918, 1923 (as Kilkishen), 1932 (as Kilkishen), 1937 |
| 7. | Feakle | 7 | 1935, 1938, 1939, 1940, 1944, 1988, 2024 |
| 8. | Ruan | 5 | 1948, 1951, 1959, 1960, 1962 |
| 8. | Scariff | 5 | 1907, 1917, 1946, 1952, 1953 |
| 8. | St. Joseph's, Doora-Barefield | 5 | 1954, 1958, 1998, 1999, 2001 |
| 11. | Ballyea | 4 | 2016, 2018, 2021, 2022 |
| 11. | Inagh-Kilnamona | 4 | 1902 (as Kilnamona), 1903 (as Kilnamona), 1908 (as Kilnamona), 2026 |
| 13 | Clonlara | 3 | 1919, 2008, 2023 |
| 14. | Bodyke | 2 | 1947, 1975 (as Brian Boru's) |
| | Cratloe | 2 | 2009, 2014 |
| | Crusheen | 2 | 2010, 2011 |
| | Kilmaley | 2 | 1985, 2004 |
| | Whitegate | 2 | 1950, 1961 |
| | Wolfe Tones, Shannon | 2 | 1996, 2006 |
| 20. | Clooney-Quin | 1 | 1942(as Clooney) |
| | Killanena | 1 | 1975 (as Brian Boru's) |
| | Ogonnelloe | 1 | 1888 |
| | Smith O'Brien's, Killaloe | 1 | 1887 (with Garranboy) |

== List of Clare SHC finals ==
All-Ireland Club Champions Munster Club Champions Munster Club Finalists

| Year | Winners | Score | Runners-up | Score |
|---|---|---|---|---|
| 2026 | Inagh-Kilnamona | 2-18 | Kilmaley | 1-14 |
| 2025 | Eire Óg, Ennis | 0–17 | Clooney-Quin | 0–12 |
| 2024 | Feakle | 1–17 | Sixmilebridge | 0–13 |
| 2023 | Clonlara | 3–18 | Crusheen | 2–16 |
| 2022 | Ballyea | 2–14 | Éire Óg, Ennis | 1–16 |
| 2021 | Ballyea | 1–17 | Inagh-Kilnamona | 1–16 |
| 2020 | Sixmilebridge | 0-20 | O'Callaghan's Mills | 0–12 |
| 2019 | Sixmilebridge | 0-21 | Cratloe | 0–15 |
| 2018 | Ballyea | 1-20 | Cratloe | 1–14 |
| 2017 (R) | Sixmilebridge | (0–19) 1-20 | Clooney-Quin | (1–16) 1–14 |
| 2016 (R) | Ballyea | (1–11) 2–14 | Clonlara | (1–11) 2–11 |
| 2015 | Sixmilebridge | 1-21 | Clonlara | 0–15 |
| 2014 | Cratloe | 0–14 | Crusheen | 0-06 |
| 2013 | Sixmilebridge | 1–10 | Newmarket-on-Fergus | 0–11 |
| 2012 | Newmarket-on-Fergus | 3–10 | Cratloe | 0-09 |
| 2011 | Crusheen | 0–10 | Sixmilebridge | 0-04 |
| 2010 | Crusheen | 2–13 | Cratloe | 1–11 |
| 2009 | Cratloe | 3-05 | Clonlara | 1-09 |
| 2008 | Clonlara | 1–12 | Newmarket-on-Fergus | 1-09 |
| 2007 | Tulla | 1-07 | Crusheen | 0-09 |
| 2006 | Wolfe Tones, Shannon | 2–11 | Newmarket-on-Fergus | 0–13 |
| 2005 | Clarecastle | 0-09 | Wolfe Tones, Shannon | 0-07 |
| 2004 | Kilmaley | 1–10 | St. Joseph's, Doora-Barefield | 1-09 |
| 2003 | Clarecastle | 3–14 | Ballyea | 1–11 |
| 2002 | Sixmilebridge | 3–10 | Clarecastle | 2-08 |
| 2001 | St. Joseph's, Doora-Barefield | 1–15 | Sixmilebridge | 1–12 |
| 2000 | Sixmilebridge | 4-09 | Éire Óg, Ennis | 1-08 |
| 1999 | St. Joseph's, Doora-Barefield | 3–12 | Sixmilebridge | 1–12 |
| 1998 | St. Joseph's, Doora-Barefield | | Kilmaley | |
| 1997 | Clarecastle | 2–11 | St. Joseph's, Doora-Barefield | 0–11 |
| 1996 | Wolfe Tones, Shannon | 1–11 | Clarecastle | 1-08 |
| 1995 | Sixmilebridge | 2–10 | Scariff | 0–15 |
| 1994 | Clarecastle | | St. Joseph's, Doora-Barefield | |
| 1993 | Sixmilebridge | 3-08 | O'Callaghan's Mills | 2-06 |
| 1992 | Sixmilebridge | 1–11 | Éire Óg, Ennis | 1–10 |
| 1991 | Clarecastle | | Scariff | |
| 1990 | Éire Óg, Ennis | 1-05 | O'Callaghan's Mills | 1-03 |
| 1989 | Sixmilebridge | 3–14 | Clarecastle | 1–11 |
| 1988 | Feakle | | Ruan | |
| 1987 | Clarecastle | | Feakle | |
| 1986 | Clarecastle | | O'Callaghan's Mills | |
| 1985 | Kilmaley | | Éire Óg, Ennis | |
| 1984 | Sixmilebridge | 3-07 | Clarecastle | 1-12 |
| 1983 (R) | Sixmilebridge | | Éire Óg, Ennis | |
| 1982 | Éire Óg, Ennis | 3-08 | Sixmilebridge | 2-09 |
| 1981 | Newmarket-on-Fergus | 3-08 | Tubber | 1–10 |
| 1980 | Éire Óg, Ennis | | Newmarket-on-Fergus | |
| 1979 | Sixmilebridge | | St. Brendan's (Kilmaley / Barefield) | |
| 1978 | Newmarket-on-Fergus | 3–10 | Clarecastle | 2-08 |
| 1977 | Sixmilebridge | | Kilkishen | |
| 1976 | Newmarket-on-Fergus | 1–11 | Sixmilebridge | 1-05 |
| 1975 | Brian Boru's (Bodyke / Killanena / Tulla) | | Éire Óg, Ennis | |
| 1974 | Newmarket-on-Fergus | 1-06 | Crusheen | 2-02 |
| 1973 | Newmarket-on-Fergus | 7–10 | Clarecastle | 4–16 |
| 1972 | Newmarket-on-Fergus | 7-08 | St. Senan's (Clonlara / Cratloe) | 3-05 |
| 1971 (R) | Newmarket-on-Fergus | (3-09) 2-07 | Clarecastle | (2–12) 1-07 |
| 1970 | Clarecastle | | Crusheen | |
| 1969 (R) | Newmarket-on-Fergus | (3-05) 9–13 | Clarecastle | (2-08) 3-06 |
| 1968 | Newmarket-on-Fergus | 2-08 | Clarecastle | 1-09 |
| 1967 | Newmarket-on-Fergus | 3–10 | Clarecastle | 2-04 |
| 1966 | Éire Óg, Ennis | 2-08 | Whitegate | 1-04 |
| 1965 | Newmarket-on-Fergus | 2-06 | Éire Óg, Ennis | 1-06 |
| 1964 | Newmarket-on-Fergus | 8–12 | Clarecastle | 5-07 |
| 1963 | Newmarket-on-Fergus | 6–10 | Whitegate | 3-07 |
| 1962 | Ruan | | Sixmilebridge | |
| 1961 | Whitegate | | Newmarket-on-Fergus | |
| 1960 | Ruan | | Scariff | |
| 1959 | Ruan | | Éire Óg, Ennis | |
| 1958 | St. Joseph's, Doora-Barefield | 3-06 | Feakle | 2-02 |
| 1957 | Éire Óg, Ennis | 5-09 | Whitegate | 2-03 |
| 1956 | Éire Óg, Ennis | 4-05 | Clarecastle | 2-08 |
| 1955 | Newmarket-on-Fergus | 3-09 | Éire Óg, Ennis | 3-03 |
| 1954 | St. Joseph's, Doora-Barefield | | O'Callaghan's Mills | |
| 1953 | Scariff | | Newmarket-on-Fergus | |
| 1952 | Scariff | | Sixmilebridge | |
| 1951 | Ruan | | | |
| 1950 | Whitegate | | Ruan | |
| 1949 | Clarecastle | | | |
| 1948 | Ruan | | Clarecastle | |
| 1947 | Bodyke | | | |
| 1946 | Scariff | | | |
| 1945 | Clarecastle | | | |
| 1944 | Feakle | | Clooney | |
| 1943 | Clarecastle | | Scariff | |
| 1942 | Clooney | 3-06 | Scariff | 3-05 |
| 1941 | Ennis Dalcassians | | | |
| 1940 | Feakle | | Clooney | |
| 1939 | Feakle | | Clarecastle | |
| 1938 | Feakle | | Kilkishen | |
| 1937 | O'Callaghan's Mills | | Clarecastle | |
| 1936 | Newmarket-on-Fergus | 6-02 | Clarecastle | 2-03 |
| 1935 | Feakle | | Newmarket-on-Fergus | |
| 1934 | Ennis Dalcassians | | | |
| 1933 | Tulla | | | |
| 1932 | Kilkishen | | | |
| 1931 | Newmarket-on-Fergus | 3-04 | Ennis Dalcassians | 1-03 |
| 1930 | Newmarket-on-Fergus | 6-03 | Ennis Dalcassians | 3-03 |
| 1929 | Ennis Dalcassians | | | |
| 1928 | Ennis Dalcassians / Clarecastle | | Newmarket-on-Fergus | |
| 1927 | Newmarket-on-Fergus | | Ennis Dalcassians | |
| 1926 | Newmarket-on-Fergus | 3-05 | O'Callaghan's Mills | 2-03 |
| 1925 | Newmarket-on-Fergus | 4-02 | Tulla | 0-03 |
| 1924 | Ennis Dalcassians | | | |
| 1923 | Kilkishen | | Feakle | |
| 1922 | No Championship | | | |
| 1921 | No Championship | | | |
| 1920 | No Championship | | | |
| 1919 | Clonlara | | Scariff | |
| 1918 | O'Callaghan's Mills | | Scariff | |
| 1917 | Scariff | | Feakle | |
| 1916 | Newmarket-on-Fergus | 8-02 | Ennis Dalcassians | 2-02 |
| 1915 | Ennis Dalcassians | | | |
| 1914 | Ennis Dalcassians | | | |
| 1913 | Tulla | | | |
| 1912 | Newmarket-on-Fergus | 3-03 | Tulla | 3-01 |
| 1911 | Ennis Dalcassians | | | |
| 1910 | O'Callaghan's Mills | | | |
| 1909 | O'Callaghan's Mills | | | |
| 1908 | Kilnamona | 0–11 | O'Callaghan's Mills | 0–10 |
| 1907 | Scariff | | O'Callaghan's Mills | |
| 1906 | O'Callaghan's Mills | | | |
| 1905 | Tulla | | | |
| 1904 | O'Callaghan's Mills | | | |
| 1903 | Kilnamona | 4–14 | Thomonds | 0-00 |
| 1902 | Kilnamona | | Barefield | |
| 1901 | No Championship | | | |
| 1900 | Carrahan | | | |
| 1899 | Tulla | | | |
| 1898 | Carrahan | | | |
| 1897 | Tulla | | | |
| 1896 | Tulla | | | |
| 1895 | No Championship | | | |
| 1894 | No Championship | | | |
| 1893 | No Championship | | | |
| 1892 | No Championship | | | |
| 1891 | No Championship | | | |
| 1890 | Ennis Faughs (Ennis Dals / Barefield) | | Feakle | |
| 1889 | Tulla | | Feakle | |
| 1888 | Ogonnelloe | | | |
| 1887 | Smith O'Brien's / Garranboy | | Ogonnelloe | |

- In early 1890, Ennis Dalcassians offered an opportunity to any players from their neighbours, Doora-Barefield, to join with them and compete for the senior hurling title. Ennis Faughs immediately won the 1890 senior hurling final against Feakle, completing the hurling-half of the first "Double" achieved by a Clare club, as Ennis Dalcassians also won the 1890 senior football final.
- St. Senan's were an amalgamation of the Clonlara and Cratloe clubs from South-East Clare. St. Senan's lost the 1972 senior hurling final to Newmarket-on-Fergus.
- Brian Boru's were an amalgamation that drew its players from the Bodyke, Killanena and Tulla clubs from East Clare. They competed together at senior level when they were all competing individually at intermediate or junior level. Brian Boru's won the 1975 senior hurling final against Éire Óg.
- St. Brendan's were an amalgamation of the Doora-Barefield and Kilmaley clubs from Mid Clare. St. Brendan's lost the 1979 senior hurling final to Sixmilebridge.

== Records and statistics ==
=== The "Double" ===
The following clubs have won both the Clare Senior Hurling Championship and Clare Senior Football Championship in the same year:

- Four times by Ennis Dalcassians (1890, 1911, 1914 & 1929)
- Once by Cratloe (2014)
- Once by Éire Óg, Ennis (2025)

=== Consecutive championships ===
- 5-in-a-row:
  - Once by Tulla-Carrahan (1896–1900)
- 4-in-a-row:
  - Once by Newmarket-on-Fergus (1971–1974)
- 3-in-a-row:
  - Three times by Newmarket-on-Fergus (1925–1927), (1963–1965) & (1967–1969)
  - Once by Feakle (1938–1940)

=== By decade ===
The most successful team of each decade, judged by number of Clare Senior Hurling Championship titles they won, is as follows:

- 1880s: One title each for Smith O'Brien's, Killaloe (1887 (with Garranboy)), Ogonnelloe (1888) & Tulla (1889)
- 1890s: Four titles for Tulla (1896, 1897, 1898 (as Carrahan), 1899)
- 1900s: Three titles each for Kilnamona (1902, 1903, 1908) & O'Callaghan's Mills (1904, 1906, 1909)
- 1910s: Three titles for Ennis Dalcassians (1911, 1914, 1915)
- 1920s: Three titles each for Newmarket-on-Fergus (1925, 1926, 1927) & Ennis Dalcassians (1924, 1928 (with Clarecastle), 1929)
- 1930s: Three titles each for Newmarket-on-Fergus (1930, 1931, 1936) & Feakle (1935, 1938, 1939)
- 1940s: Three titles for Clarecastle (1943, 1945, 1949)
- 1950s: Two titles each for Scariff (1952, 1953), Éire Óg (1956, 1957), St. Joseph's, Doora-Barefield (1954, 1958) & Ruan (1951, 1959)
- 1960s: Six titles for Newmarket-on-Fergus (1963, 1964, 1965, 1967, 1968, 1969)
- 1970s: Six titles for Newmarket-on-Fergus (1971, 1972, 1973, 1974, 1976, 1978)
- 1980s: Three titles for Sixmilebridge (1983, 1984, 1989)
- 1990s: Three titles each for Sixmilebridge (1992, 1993, 1995) & Clarecastle (1991, 1994, 1997)
- 2000s: Two titles each for Sixmilebridge (2000, 2002) & Clarecastle (2003, 2005)
- 2010s: Four titles for Sixmilebridge (2013, 2015, 2017, 2019)
- 2020s: Two titles for Ballyea (2021, 2022)

=== Barren spells ===
The longest gaps between successive Clare Senior Hurling Championship titles are:

- 118 years: Inagh-Kilnamona (1908 (as Kilnamona) - 2026)
- 89 years: Clonlara (1919–2008)
- 74 years: Tulla (1933–2007)
- 44 years: Feakle (1944–1988)
- 40 years: St. Joseph's, Doora-Barefield (1958–1998)
- 36 years: Feakle (1988–2024)
- 35 years: Éire Óg, Ennis (1990–2025)
- 31 years: Newmarket-on-Fergus (1981–2012)
- 29 years: Scariff (1917–1946)
- 21 years: Ennis Dalcassians (1890–1911) & Clarecastle (1949–1970)
- 20 years: Tulla (1913–1933)
- 19 years: O'Callaghan's Mills (1918–1937), Newmarket-on-Fergus (1936–1955) & Kilmaley (1985–2004)
- 16 years: Clarecastle (1970–1986)
- 15 years: Clonlara (2008–2023)
- 14 years: Éire Óg, Ennis (1966–1980)
- 11 years: Whitegate (1950–1961) & Sixmilebridge (2002–2013)
- 10 years: Scariff (1907–1917) & Wolfe Tones, Shannon (1996–2006)

== See also ==
- All-Ireland Senior Club Hurling Championship
- Munster Senior Club Hurling Championship
- Clare Premier Intermediate Hurling Championship
- Clare Intermediate Hurling Championship
- Clare Junior A Hurling Championship
- Clare Premier Junior B Hurling Championship
- Clare Junior B Hurling Championship
- Clare Premier Junior C Hurling Championship
- Clare Junior C Hurling Championship
- Clare Under-21 A Hurling Championship
- Clare Minor A Hurling Championship
- Clare Cup (Clare Hurling League Div.1)
