= Ruan GAA =

Gaelic games club in County Clare, Ireland

- County: Clare
- Colours: Saffron and Blue
- Grounds: Ruan

Playing kits
Regular Kit

Senior Club Championships
	All Ireland	Munster champions	Clare champions
Hurling:	-	-	5

Ruan GAA is a Gaelic Athletic Association club located in the village of Ruan, County Clare in Ireland. The club is almost exclusively concerned with the game of hurling.

== Major honours ==
- Clare Senior Hurling Championship (5): 1948, 1951, 1959, 1960, 1962
- Clare Intermediate Hurling Championship (5): 1940, 1948, 1950 (with Dysart), 1978, 2012
- Clare Junior A Hurling Championship (2): 1932, 1948
- Clare Under-21 A Hurling Championship (3): 1976, 1978, 2021 (with Corofin)
- Clare Minor A Hurling Championship (4): 1938, 1953, 2019 (with Corofin), 2020 (with Corofin)

== Noted hurlers ==
- Jimmy Smyth
- Cyril Lyons
- Robin Mounsey
