= Whitegate GAA =

Gaelic games club in County Clare, Ireland

- An Geata Bán
- County: Clare
- Nickname: The Geata
- Colours: Red and Black

Playing kits
Regular Kit	Change Kit

Senior Club Championships
	All Ireland	Munster champions	Clare champions
Hurling:	-	-	2

Whitegate GAA is a Gaelic Athletic Association club located in the village of Whitegate, County Clare, Ireland. The club is a senior hurling club and competes in Clare GAA competitions.

== Major honours ==
- Clare Senior Hurling Championship (2): 1950, 1961
- Clare Intermediate Hurling Championship (7): 1939 (as Mountshannon), 1942 (as Mountshannon), 1959, 1984, 1992, 2009, 2013
- Clare Junior A Hurling Championship (1): 1938 (as Mountshannon)
- Clare Under-21 A Hurling Championship (1): 1972

== Notable players ==
- Brendan Bugler
- Eoin Dooley ( the claw )
- Ronan Bugler ( beer and steer )
