= Clare Premier Intermediate Hurling Championship =

Sports competition in Ireland

- Current season or competition: 2026 Clare Premier Intermediate Hurling Championship
- Irish: Craobh Príomh Idirmhéanach Iomána an Chláir
- Founded: 2025
- Trophy: Paddy Browne Cup
- No. of teams: 10
- Title holders: Clarecastle (2nd title)
- Most titles: Broadford (8 titles)
- Sponsors: TUS Midlands Midwest

The Clare Premier Intermediate Hurling Championship (abbreviated to the Clare PIHC) is an annual GAA club competition organised by the Clare County Board for hurling clubs below senior level. It is contested by the top-ranking intermediate hurling clubs in County Clare, Ireland. It is the second-tier adult competition of the Clare hurling pyramid.

In 2025 the Clare County Board introduced three new levels to the Clare hurling pyramid – Premier Intermediate, Premier Junior B and Premier Junior C. Every level below the sixteen-team senior level was now a new or updated ten-team level, with the respective champions promoted up one level, and the losers of a relegation play-off dropping down a level for the following year.

From 1927 to 2024 the Clare IHC was the second-tier of the Clare hurling pyramid. However, since the introduction of premier intermediate in 2025, it is effectively a new competition with a new trophy on offer for the winners. The Pappy O'Callaghan Cup was commissioned for the intermediate champions from 2025 onwards, and the previous intermediate trophy, the Paddy Browne Cup, is now awarded to the premier intermediate champions.

The winners of the Clare PIHC are presented with the Paddy Browne Cup, and are promoted to the Clare Senior Hurling Championship.

The current (2026) champions are Clarecastle who defeated Corofin by 4-27 to 2-12.

== Munster club qualification ==
Prior to the creation of the Clare PIHC in 2025, the winners of the Clare Intermediate Hurling Championship qualified to represent Clare in the Munster Intermediate Club Hurling Championship. From 2025, the winners of the Clare PIHC have this honour. However, if a second-, third-, or fourth-string team wins the Clare PIFC, the highest finishing first-string team qualifies instead.

Three Clare clubs have won the Munster Intermediate Club Hurling Championship:

- Clooney-Quin won the 2006 Munster intermediate club title, beating Bishopstown (Cork) in the final.
- Clonlara won the 2007 Munster intermediate club title, beating Dromin-Athlacca (Limerick) in the final.
- Wolfe Tones won the 2015 Munster intermediate club title, beating Newcestown (Cork) in the final. They later lost to Bennettsbridge (Kilkenny) in the All-Ireland intermediate club semi-final.

Four more Clare clubs have reached the Munster intermediate club final:

- Broadford lost the 2008 final to Blarney (Cork).
- Kilmaley lost the 2017 final to Kanturk (Cork).
- Feakle lost the 2018 final to Charleville (Cork).
- Corofin lost the 2023 final to Castlelyons (Cork).
- O'Callaghan's Mills lost the 2025 final to Upperchurch-Drombane (Tipperary).

No Clare club has won the All-Ireland Intermediate Club Hurling Championship.

== 2026 Premier Intermediate clubs ==
The ten teams competing in the 2026 Clare Premier Intermediate Hurling Championship are:

Club	Location	Colours	Titles	Last title
Bodyke	Bodyke	Black & Amber	5	1996
Clarecastle	Clarecastle	Black & White	1	1931
Corofin	Corofin	Red & White	3	2023
Parteen-Meelick	Parteen / Meelick	Blue & Red	1	1956
Ruan	Ruan	Saffron & Blue	5	2012
Sixmilebridge	Sixmilebridge	Saffron & Blue	5	1990
Smith O'Brien's, Killaloe	Killaloe	Scarlet & Amber	2	2021
Tubber	Tubber	Black & Amber	2	1976
Tulla	Tulla	Claret & Gold	1	1979
Whitegate	Whitegate	Red & Black	7	2013

Second-String Team Old Intermediate Title (1927–2024)

== Roll of honour ==
#	Club	Wins	Years won	Years old intermediate won
1.	Broadford	8		1941, 1947, 1974, 1981, 1997, 2003, 2008, 2019
2.	Whitegate	7		1939 (as Mountshannon), 1942 (as Mountshannon), 1959, 1984, 1992, 2009, 2013
3.	O'Callaghan's Mills	6	2025	1929 (as Kilkishen), 1933, 1935 (as Kilkishen), 1968, 1977
4.	Bodyke	5		1932, 1936, 1946, 1969, 1996
4.	Clonlara	5		1928, 1975, 1989, 1999, 2007
4.	Ruan	5		1940, 1948, 1950 (with Dysart), 1978, 2012
4.	Sixmilebridge	5		1951, 1957 (as Cappagh), 1971, 1988, 1990
8.	Cratloe	4		1937, 1943, 1970, 1994
8.	Éire Óg, Ennis	4		1927 (as Ennis Rovers), 1945 (as Ennis Faughs), 1958 (as St. John's), 2011
8.	Feakle	4		1930, 1973, 2014, 2018
8.	St. Joseph's, Doora-Barefield	4		1985, 1993, 2016, 2022
12.	Clooney-Quin	3		1934 (as Clooney), 1986 (as Clooney), 2006
12.	Corofin	3		1991, 2002, 2023
12.	Crusheen	3		1960, 1987, 2000
12.	Scariff	3		1938, 1982, 2020
12.	Wolfe Tones, Shannon	3		1983, 2015, 2024
17.	Ballyea	2		1944, 2001
17.	Inagh-Kilnamona	2		1998 (as Kilnamona), 2005 (as Inagh)
17.	Kilmaley	2		1980, 2017
17.	Smith O'Brien's, Killaloe	2		2004, 2021
17.	Tubber	2		1972, 1976
17.	Clarecastle	2	2026	1931
23	Killanena	1		2010
23	Newmarket-on-Fergus	1		1967
23	Ogonnelloe	1		1995
23	Our Lady's Mental Hospital, Ennis	1		1952
23	Parteen-Meelick	1		1956 (as Parteen)
23	Tulla	1		1979

== List of Clare PIHC finals ==
Munster Intermediate Club Champions Munster Intermediate Club Finalists Old Intermediate Title (1927–2024)

Year	Winners	Score	Runners-up	Score
2026	Clarecastle	4-27	Corofin	2-12
2025	O'Callaghan's Mills	2-19	Clarecastle	1-16
2024	Wolfe Tones, Shannon	1-17	Tubber	0-19
2023	Corofin	0-18	Sixmilebridge	0-14
2022	St. Joseph's, Doora-Barefield		Tulla	
2021	Smith O'Brien's, Killaloe		St. Joseph's, Doora-Barefield	
2020	Scariff		Tubber	
2019	Broadford		St. Joseph's, Doora-Barefield	
2018	Feakle		Tubber	
2017	Kilmaley		Tubber	
2016	St. Joseph's, Doora-Barefield		Broadford	
2015	Wolfe Tones, Shannon		Broadford	
2014	Feakle		Parteen	
2013	Whitegate		Feakle	
2012	Ruan		Crusheen	
2011	Éire Óg, Ennis		Ruan	
2010	Killanena		Ruan	
2009	Whitegate		Feakle	
2008	Broadford		Sixmilebridge	
2007	Clonlara		Killanena	
2006	Clooney-Quin		Killanena	
2005	Inagh		Bodyke	
2004	Smith O'Brien's, Killaloe		Clooney-Quin	
2003	Broadford		Feakle	
2002	Corofin		Clooney-Quin	
2001	Ballyea		Sixmilebridge	
2000	Crusheen		Clooney	
1999	Clonlara		Crusheen	
1998	Kilnamona		Inagh	
1997	Broadford		Sixmilebridge	
1996	Bodyke		Clonlara	
1995	Ogonnelloe		Crusheen	
1994	Cratloe		Ogonnelloe	
1993	St. Joseph's, Doora-Barefield		Scariff	
1992	Whitegate		Ogonnelloe	
1991	Corofin		St. Joseph's, Doora-Barefield	
1990	Sixmilebridge		Cratloe	
1989	Clonlara		Bodyke	
1988	Sixmilebridge		Corofin	
1987	Crusheen		Clarecastle	
1986	Clooney		Corofin	
1985	St. Joseph's, Doora-Barefield		Clooney	
1984	Whitegate		St. Joseph's, Doora-Barefield	
1983	Wolfe Tones, Shannon		Killanena	
1982	Scariff		Killanena	
1981	Broadford		Scariff	
1980	Kilmaley		Cratloe	
1979	Tulla		Cratloe	
1978	Ruan		Clonlara	
1977	O'Callaghan's Mills		Kilmaley	
1976	Tubber		Scariff	
1975	Clonlara		Wolfe Tones, Shannon	
1974	Broadford		O'Callaghan's Mills	
1973	Feakle		Broadford	
1972	Tubber		Feakle	
1971	Sixmilebridge		Tubber	
1970	Cratloe		Smith O'Brien's, Killaloe	
1969	Bodyke		Smith O'Brien's, Killaloe	
1968	O'Callaghan's Mills		Cratloe	
1967	Newmarket-on-Fergus		Bodyke	
1966	No Championship			
1965	No Championship			
1964	No Championship			
1963	No Championship			
1962	No Championship			
1961	No Championship			
1960	Crusheen		O'Callaghan's Mills	
1959	Whitegate		Clooney	
1958	St. John's, Ennis		Scariff	
1957	Cappagh		Sixmilebridge	
1956	Parteen		Turnpike, Ennis	
1955	No Championship			
1954	No Championship			
1953	Competition Unfinished			
1952	Our Lady's Mental Hospital, Ennis		O'Callaghan's Mills	
1951	Sixmilebridge		Turnpike, Ennis	
1950	Dysart / Ruan			
1949	No Championship			
1948	Ruan		Whitegate	
1947	Broadford		Ardnacrusha	
1946	Bodyke		Ruan	
1945	Ennis Faughs (Ennis Dals / Barefield)		Broadford	
1944	Ballyea		Broadford	
1943	Cratloe		Broadford	
1942	Mountshannon		Sixmilebridge	
1941	Broadford		Scariff	
1940	Ruan		Sixmilebridge	
1939	Mountshannon		Sixmilebridge	
1938	Scariff		Ennis Rovers	
1937	Cratloe		Scariff	
1936	Bodyke		Ruan	
1935	Kilkishen		Bodyke	
1934	Clooney		Kilkishen	
1933	O'Callaghan's Mills		Feakle	
1932	Bodyke		O'Callaghan's Mills	
1931	Clarecastle		O'Callaghan's Mills	
1930	Feakle		Bodyke	
1929	Kilkishen		Kilbane / Ogonnelloe	
1928	Clonlara		Ennis Dalcassians	
1927	Ennis Rovers		Kilmore	

- In late 1943, Ennis Dalcassians offered an opportunity to any players from their neighbours and fellow junior club, Doora-Barefield, to join with them and compete for titles at a higher level in both codes. Ennis Faughs won the 1945 intermediate hurling final against Broadford.
- In early 1974, Éire Óg took complete control over the organisation of gaelic games in Ennis when it merged with Ennis Rovers, St. John's and Turnpike to form one combined club for the town. Ennis Rovers won the 1927 intermediate hurling final against Kilmore, and lost the 1938 intermediate hurling final to Scariff. Turnpike lost the 1951 and 1956 intermediate hurling finals to Sixmilebridge and Parteen respectively. St. John's won the 1958 intermediate hurling final against Scariff.

== See also ==
- All-Ireland Intermediate Club Hurling Championship
- Munster Intermediate Club Hurling Championship
- Clare Senior Hurling Championship
- Clare Intermediate Hurling Championship
- Clare Junior A Hurling Championship
- Clare Premier Junior B Hurling Championship
- Clare Junior B Hurling Championship
- Clare Premier Junior C Hurling Championship
- Clare Junior C Hurling Championship
- Clare Under-21 A Hurling Championship
- Clare Minor A Hurling Championship
- Clare Cup (Clare Hurling League Div.1)
