= Féile na nGael =

GAA youth jamboree and tournaments

Féile na nGael hurling
- Irish: Craobh Féile na nGael Iománaíochta
- Founded: 1971
- Trophy: Christy Ring Trophy
- Title holders: Ballincollig Cork (1st title)
- First winner: Blackrock
- Most titles: St Patrick's/James Stephens (7 titles)
- Sponsors: Ninas

Féile na nGael camogie
- Irish: Craobh Féile na nGael Camógaíochta
- Founded: 1974
- Trophy: Corn Uí Phuirséil
- Title holders: Lucan Sarsfields (Dublin). (1st title)
- First winner: Rathnure
- Most titles: Oulart the Ballagh (5 titles)

Féile na nGael (pronounced [ˈfʲeːlʲə n̪ˠə ˈŋeːl̪ˠ]; Irish for "Festival of the Gaels") is an annual tournament, for players under 15 years of age, comprising the sports of hurling, camogie and handball organised by the Gaelic Athletic Association. The competition hosts approximately 25,000 boys and girls each year with all 32 of Ireland's Gaelic games counties represented along with teams from London, Lancashire, Warwickshire, New York, Australasia and Europe.

Féile na nGael was first held in 1971 and was hosted by Tipperary. Since then it has been held annually in late June in different counties. Féile na nGael in 2011 was hosted by Galway. Participation in Féile na nGael is by invitation. In general, all clubs in the host county are invited to participate, while all other counties host local versions of the event and the winners are then nominated to represent their county at the national event. Sometimes the runners-up in certain counties may be invited also and the organising committee is free to decide how many clubs from a particular county are invited each year. The Division 1 Féile na nGael winners receive the Christy Ring cup commemorating the noted Cork hurler. It depicts Cloyne Tower in Cork.

== Format ==
The general format of Féile involves several divisions, each divided into four groups of four teams. All teams in each group play each other. A team receives two points for a win, one for a draw and no points for a loss. The four teams in each division that win their group qualifies for the semi-finals. The two semi-final winners then play in the final. Games are 20 minutes a half instead of the standard 30 minutes. Teams usually play their first game on the Friday afternoon that the festival begins. Following this, there is a parade for all teams through the main town of the county in which the Féile is being hosted. On the Saturday, all teams play a further two group games in the morning while semi-finals are played in the evening. The finals are played in the main GAA stadium in the host county on the Sunday of the festival.

== Successful clubs ==
James Stephens of Kilkenny have won the title a record 7 times, most recently in 2008. Na Piarsaigh of Cork have won the Féile na nGael title 22 times, most recently in 2021. Glen Rovers have won the title five times. In all, Cork clubs have captured 14 titles, Kilkenny have 11 and Galway have seven, while Limerick, Clare and Dublin clubs have won three titles each. Kevin Lynch's Hurling Club from Derry have also won seven Féile na Gael titles across various divisions.

In camogie, the Oulart the Ballagh club from Wexford won five Féile na nGael titles in a row from 1998 to 2002, while Douglas from Cork won three titles in a row from 2004 to 2006. In terms of counties, Galway has the most wins with nine, followed by Dublin and Cork with seven while Wexford clubs have won the title six times.

== Host counties ==
- 1971-2 Tipperary
- 1973-4 Limerick
- 1975-6 Cork
- 1977 Waterford
- 1978-9 Kilkenny
- 1980-1 Galway
- 1982-3 Dublin
- 1984-5 Wexford
- 1986-7 Clare
- 1988-9 Laois & Offaly
- 1990-1 Tipperary
- 1992-3 Galway
- 1994-5 Limerick
- 1996-7 Waterford
- 1998-9 Wexford
- 2000 Antrim
- 2001 Cork
- 2002 Antrim
- 2003-4 Meath & Westmeath
- 2005-6 Cork
- 2007 Kilkenny
- 2008-09 Laois & Offaly
- 2010 Clare
- 2011 Galway
- 2012 Dublin
- 2013 Limerick
- 2014 Ulster
- 2015 Ulster
- 2016 Waterford & Tipperary
- 2017
- 2018
- 2019 Cork
- 2020
- 2021
- 2022
- 2023 Mayo
- 2024-5 Wexford
- 2026 Laois/Carlow

== Division 1 Hurling (Christy Ring Trophy) finals ==
- 1971 Blackrock (Cork) 2-4 Eoghan Rua (Dublin) 0–08
- 1972 Old Christians (Limerick) 6-03 Nenagh (Tipperary) 1–00
- 1973 Na Piarsaigh (Cork) 2-06 Na Fianna (Wexford) 1–04
- 1974 Na Piarsaigh (Cork) 3-02 Cappoquin (Waterford) 1–01
- 1975 Glen Rovers (Cork) 1-02 Kilkenny CBS (Kilkenny) 0–04
- 1976 Glen Rovers (Cork) 6-06 Éire Óg Ennis (Clare) 0–03
- 1977 Na Piarsaigh (Cork) 3-10 Éire Óg Ennis (Clare) 1–01
- 1978 St Finbarr's (Cork) 2-07 St Patrick's-Jas Stephens (Kilkenny) 2–1
- 1979 Glen Rovers (Cork) 1-05 Toomevara (Tipperary) 1–04
- 1980 Na Piarsaigh (Cork) 1-05 Kilruane MacDonagh's (Tipperary) 2–2
- 1982 Glen Rovers (Cork) 1-05 Thomastown (Kilkenny) 0–01
- 1983 St Patrick's-Jas Stephens (Kilkenny) 1-00 St Finbarr's (Cork) 0–0
- 1984 Na Piarsaigh (Limerick) 1-4 Toomevara (Tipperary) 1–0
- 1985 St Finbarr's (Cork) 6-10 Young Irelands (Kilkenny) 1–2
- 1986 Wolfe Tones (Clare) 5-06 Piltown (Kilkenny) 3–02
- 1987 Wolfe Tones (Clare) 4-04 Éire Óg Ennis (Clare) 2–00
- 1988 Wolfe Tones (Clare) 4-03 Bishopstown (Cork) 3–04
- 1989 James Stephens (Kilkenny) 0-09 St Vincents (Dublin) 0–02
- 1990 Dúrlas Óg (Tipperary) 2-04 Kilruane MacDonagh's (Tipperary) 1–04
- 1991 Na Piarsaigh (Cork) 1-06 Loughrea (Galway) 1–04
- 1992 Ballyboden St Enda's (Dublin) 4-08 Loughrea (Galway) 2–10
- 1993 Loughrea (Galway) 2-05 Turloughmore (Galway) 2–03
- 1994 James Stephens (Kilkenny) 2-09 St Finbarr's (Cork) 0–01
- 1995 Sixmilebridge (Clare) 1-05 Drom-Inch (Tipperary) 1-05

(Trophy shared - sides finished level after extra time)

- 1996 James Stephens (Kilkenny) 4-03 Kilmallock (Limerick) 2–02
- 1997 Tullaroan (Kilkenny) 2-12 Sarsfields (Cork) 2–07
- 1998 Ballyhale Shamrocks (Kilkenny) 1-10 Toomevara (Tipperary) 1–02
- 1999 Éire Óg Ennis (Clare) 3-11 Glen Rovers (Cork) 0–03
- 2000 Sarsfields (Cork) 3-06 Loughrea (Galway) 2–06
- 2001 Oulart the Ballagh (Wexford) 2-5 St Rynagh's (Offaly) 1–05
- 2002 Glen Rovers (Cork) 2-08 O'Loughlin Gaels (Kilkenny) 2–04
- 2003 James Stephens (Kilkenny) 3-07 Dúrlas Óg (Tippeary) 1–3
- 2004 Ahane (Limerick) 6-06 Shelmaliers (Wexford) 2–03
- 2005 Kilmacud Crokes (Dublin) 4-04 Blackrock (Cork) 1–01
- 2006 Na Piarsaigh (Cork) 1-05 St Mary's Athenry (Galway) 1–04
- 2007 Castleknock (Dublin) 4-08 Ahane (Limerick) 0–03
- 2008 James Stephens (Kilkenny) 1-07 Na Piarsaigh (Cork) 1–06
- 2009 Dicksboro (Kilkenny) 3-14 Kilcormac/Killoughey (Offaly)
- 2010 Turloughmore (Galway) 0-12 Na Piarsaigh(Cork) 1-04
- 2011 O'Loughlin Gaels (Kilkenny) 3-08 Na Piarsaigh (Limerick) 0–04
- 2012 St Brigid's (Dublin) 1-09 Clarinbridge (Galway) 1–07
- 2013 Ballyboden St Endas (Dublin) 4-2 Douglas (Cork) 0–04
- 2014 Kevin Lynch's (Derry) 0-11 Dunloy Cuchullians (Antrim) 1–04
- 2015 St Ernans (Westmeath) 2-04 Kilmacow (Kilkenny) 1–02
- 2016 Faythe Harriers (Wexford) 2-03 Glen Rovers (Cork) 0–02
- 2017 Dicksboro (Kilkenny) 3-11 Sixmilebridge (Clare) 0–01
- 2018 Turloughmore (Galway) 0-08 Durlas Óg (Tippeary) 0–06
- 2019 Turloughmore (Galway) 3-06 Na Piarsaigh (Cork) 1–01
- 2020
- 2021 Clarinbridge (Galway) 3-13 Ballygunner (Waterford) 1–05
- 2022 Dúrlas Óg (Tipperary) 2-10 Ahane (Limerick) 0–05
- 2023 Athenry (Galway) 1-07 Carrigtwohill (Cork) 0–05
- 2024 Oranmore-Maree (Galway) 1-07 Midleton (Cork) 1–05
- 2025 Ballygunner (Waterford) 3-11 Ballinora (Cork) 1-01
- 2026 Ballincollig (Cork) Michael Cusacks (Galway)

=== Hurling Division 2 winners (Canon Fogarty Trophy) ===
- 1971 Comeda (Antrim) 8-06 Cappawhite (Tipperary) 1–01
- 1972 Abbeyleix (Laois) 7-06 Lorrha (Tipperary) 0–00
- 1973 St Rynagh's (Offaly) 2-05 Turin (Westmeath) 1–03
- 1974 Comeda (Antrim) 5-03 Patrickswell (Limerick) 1–00
- 1975 Delaney's (Cork) 4-05 Ballycastle (Antrim) 2–05
- 1976 Birr (Offaly) 3-02 Brian Dillons (Cork) 0–01
- 1977 Birr (Offaly) 9-03 Rathdowney (Laois) 1–03
- 1978 Mooncoin (Kilkenny) 4-03 Mount Sion (Waterford) 0–03
- 1979 Mountrath (Laois) 5-01 Bennettsbridge 1-03
- 1980 Portlaoise (Laois) 1-06 Dungarvan (Waterford) 0–02
- 1981 Portlaoise (Laois) 5-04 Lismore (Waterford) 2–00
- 1982 Kevin Lynch's (Derry) 3-05 Dunloy Cuchullians (Antrim) 1–06
- 1983 Mount Sion (Waterford) w/o St. Fintan's, Durrow (Laois) Disqualified
- 1984 St Vincent's (Dublin) 2-05 Horeswood (Wexford) 0–01
- 1985 Birr (Offaly) 5-10 Dunloy Cuchullians (Antrim) 3–02
- 1986 Cratloe (Clare) 3-02 Smith O'Brien's (Clare) 1–00
- 1987 Naomh Pól (Antrim) 2-05 Lismore (Waterford) 1–01
- 1988 Lismore (Waterford) 1-04 Ferbane-Belmont (Offaly) 0–00
- 1989 Ballygalget (Down) 0-08 Geraldine O'Hanrahan's (Wexford) 1–00
- 1990 Rathnure (Wexford) 2-03 Boherlahan-Dualla (Tipperary) 1–02
- 1991 Horeswood (Wexford) 2-07 Borrisoleigh (Tipperary) 1–02
- 1992 Killimor (Galway) 2-02 Ballinderreen (Galway) 0–03
- 1993 Portlaoise (Laois) 3-05 Sarsfields (Galway) 0–02
- 1994 Oulart the Ballagh (Wexford) 5-04 Na Piarsaigh (Limerick) 1–03
- 1995 St Oliver Plunkett's (Westmeath) 2-06 Coolderry (Offaly) 2–01
- 1996 Coolderry (Offaly) 3-01 O'Donovan Rossa (Antrim) 1–03
- 1997 Oulart the Ballagh (Wexford) 1-10 Ballyduff (Kerry) 2–03
- 1998 Birr (Offaly) 2-06 Ballyduff (Kerry) 1–05
- 1999 De La Salle (Waterford) 5-09 Our Lady's Island (Wexford) 4–04
- 2000 Ballyboden St Enda's (Dublin) 3-05 Birr (Offaly) 1–08
- 2001 Mayfield (Cork) 2-07 Aghabullogue
- 2002 Carrigaline (Cork) 3-07 Camross (Laois) 2–07
- 2003 De La Salle (Waterford) 3-04 Ballyboden St Enda's (Dublin) 0–02
- 2004 Ballinascreen (Derry)
- 2005 Sarsfields (Cork)
- 2006 Naomh Eoin (Antrim)
- 2007 Castletown-Geoghegan (Westmeath)
- 2008 Naomh Eoin (Antrim)
- 2009 Portlaoise (Laois) 4-6 Portaferry (Down) 1-4 played Sunday 21 June - O'Connor Park, Tullamore
- 2010 Raharney (Westmeath)
- 2011 Raharney (Westmeath)
- 2012 Portlaoise (Laois) 3-07 St. John's (Antrim) 2–08
- 2013 O'Donovan Rossa (Antrim) 1-08 St. Rynagh's (Offaly) 1–07
- 2014 Naas (Kildare) 3-12 Oylegate-Glenbrien (Wexford) 0–01
- 2015
- 2016 Abbeyleix Gaels (Laois) 0-10 J.K. Bracken's (Tipperary) 0–02
- 2017 Rosenallis GAA (Laois) 0-05 Young Irelands (Kilkenny) 0–04
- 2018 Naas (Kildare) 4-04 Ballinascreen (Derry) 0-06
- 2019 Kilcormac-Killoughey (Offaly) 1-06 Valley Rovers (Cork) 0-06
- 2020
- 2021
- 2022
- 2023
- 2024 Ballinora (Cork)1-13 Gortnahoe-Glengoole (Tipperary) 1–03
- 2025 Naas (Kildare) Slaughtneil (Derry)

=== Hurling Division 3 winners (Michael Cusack Trophy) ===
- 1971 Dungiven (Derry) 7-04 St. Mary's, Ardee (Louth) 0–00
- 1972 Borrisoleigh (Tipperary) 3-05 St. Mary's, Ardee (Louth) 3–01
- 1973 Ballybrown (Limerick) 4-03 St. Mary's, Ardee (Louth) 1–00
- 1974 Claughaun (Limerick) 3-08 Lavey (Derry) 0–01
- 1975 Claughaun (Limerick) 2-05 Cobh (Cork) 2–02
- 1976 Cobh (Cork) 3-02 Kanturk (Cork) 1–04
- 1977 Dungiven (Derry) 1-05 Portaferry (Down) 1–02
- 1978 Dungiven (Derry) 4-06 Mullinavat (Kilkenny) 0–00
- 1979 Piltown (Kilkenny) 4-00 Carnew Emmetts(Wicklow) 2–01
- 1980 Portaferry (Down) 3-07 Pearses (Galway) 1–01
- 1981 Abbey-Duniry (Galway) 4-08 Meelick-Eyrecourt (Galway) 4–01
- 1982 Trinity Gaels (Dublin) 4-02 Keady Lámh Dhearg (Armagh) 0–04
- 1983 Naomh Barróg (Dublin) 2-03 * (Whitehall Colmcille, Dublin disqualified) 2–03
- 1984 Kenmarel (Kerry) 3-00 St. Anne's (Wexford) 0–00
- 1985 Carnew Emmetts (Wicklow) 8-03 HWH Bunclody (Wexford) 1–01
- 1986 Carnew Emmetts (Wicklow) 3-00 Éire Óg Ennis (Clare) 2–00
- 1987 Kilmoyley (Kerry) 5-05 Corofin (Clare) 0–00
- 1988 Killeigh (Offaly) 4-04 Naomh Moninne (Louth) 1-01
- 1989 Naomh Moninne (Louth) 4-03 Clara (Offaly) 3–03
- 1990 Loughmore-Castleiney (Tipperary) 1-03 Loughgiel Shamrocks (Antrim) 1–01
- 1991 Fethard (Tipperary) 4-03 Cahir (Tipperary) 0–05
- 1992 Portaferry (Down) 3-05 Michael Dwyer's (Wicklow) 0–02
- 1993 Cushendall (Antrim) 3-02 Keady Lámh Dhearg (Armagh)
- 1994 St Oliver Plunkett's (Westmeath) 0-06 O'Donovan Rossa (Antrim) 0–04
- 1995 Knockainey (Limerick) 1-07 Kildimo (Limerick) 0–03
- 1996 Ballinascreen (Derry) 2-06 Myshall (Carlow) 1–03
- 1997 Pádraig Pearse's (Roscommon) 1-04 Celbridge (Kildare) 0–02
- 1998 Keady Lámh Dhearg (Armagh) 1-11 Four Roads (Roscommon) 0–02
- 1999 St Patrick's (Wexford) 2-04 Keady Lámh Dhearg (Armagh) 2–03
- 2000 Muinebheag (Carlow) 3-03 Celbridge (Kildare) 3–02
- 2001 Michael Dwyers (Wicklow) 2-06 Ballinascreen 1–06
- 2002 Trim (Meath) 3-03 Four Roads (Roscommon) 1–03
- 2003 Ballycran (Down) 1-08 Middletown (Armagh) 1–03
- 2004 Tooreen (Mayo)
- 2005 Fermoy (Cork)
- 2006 Naas (Kildare)
- 2007 Bennettsbridge (Kilkenny)
- 2008 Harps, Durrow (Laois)
- 2009 Tinnahinch (Carlow)
- 2010 Castletown-Geoghegan (Westmeath)
- 2011 Kiltale (Meath)
- 2012 Kevin Lynch's (Derry) 2-15 Celbridge (Kildare) 1–4
- 2013 Ballinascreen 2-8 Old Christians (Limerick) 1–5
- 2014 DRAW- Robert Emmets Slaughtneil & Ferbane Belmont (Offaly)
- 2015
- 2016 St. Oliver Plunkett Eoghan Ruadh (Dublin) 1-5 Oranmore-Maree (Galway) 0–5
- 2017
- 2018 Emeralds (Kilkenny) 2-9 Mount Leinster Rangers (Carlow) 2–8
- 2019 Castleknock (Dublin) 1-12 Glen Rovers (Cork) 0–3
- 2022 Tralee Parnells (Kerry)
- 2023 Burgess (Tipperary)
- 2024
- 2025

=== Hurling Division 4 winners (Dr Birch Trophy) ===
- 1971 Portroe (Tipperary) 1-02 Knockavilla Kickhams (Tipperary) 1–01
- 1972 Golden-Kilfeakle (Tipperary) 5-03 Loughmore-Castleiney (Tipperary) 2–01
- 1973 Monaleen (Limerick) 10-08 Murroe-Boher (Limerick) 0–00
- 1974 St Michael's Enniskillen (Fermanagh) 5-01 Murroe-Boher (Limerick) 0–01
- 1975 St Michael's (Cork) Longford 0–01
- 1976 Valley Rovers (Cork) 3-05 Fermoy (Cork) 1–01
- 1977 Butlerstown (Waterford) 2-01 * (Kilrossanty, (Waterford) 3-02 disqualified)
- 1978 Dunamaggin (Kilkenny) 4-04 Coon-Muckalee (Kilkenny) 2–02
- 1978 Windgap (Kilkenny) 5-07 Ballyragget (Kilkenny) 3–03
- 1980 Annaghdown (Galway) 0-06 Moycullen (Galway) 0–03
- 1981 Carnmore (Galway) 1-01 Mervue (Galway) 0–03
- 1982 Naomh Barróg (Dublin) 2-05 Good Counsel (Dublin) 1–01
- 1983 Setanta (Dublin) 7-03 St. Patrick's, Dublin (Dublin) 1–03
- 1984 Dungannon (Tyrone) 2-04 Adamstown (Wexford) 0–02
- 1985 Clonard (Wexford) 2-05 Shamrocks (Wexford) 1–00
- 1986 Bodyke (Clare) 2-04 St Joseph's Doora-Barefield (Clare) 1–00
- 1987 Ogonelloe (Clare) 1-03 Parteen (Clare) 0–00
- 1988 Clara (Offaly) 4-04 Eoghan Ruadh (Tyrone) 1–04
- 1989 Tullamore (Offaly) 8-08 St. Nathy's, Ballymote (Sligo) 0–00
- 1990 Naomh Moninne (Louth) 4-03 Kilmoyley (Kerry) 1–01
- 1991 Kilmoyley (Kerry) 1-01 Coill Dubh (Kildare) 0–03
- 1992 Kenmare (Kerry) 3-02 Keady Lámh Dhearg (Armagh) 1–06
- 1993 Ardclough (Kildare) 4-03 Trim (Meath) 1–04
- 1994 Navan O'Mahonys (Meath) 3-10 Granagh-Ballingarry (Limerick) 1–00
- 1995 Caherline (Limerick) 5-00 Staker Wallace (Limerick) 0–05
- 1996 Killeshandra (Cavan) 2-01 Longford Slashers (Longford) 1–00
- 1997 Westport (Mayo) 3-02 Brickey Rangers (Waterford) 0–06
- 1998 Adamstown (Wexford) 2-02 Kilmore (Wexford) 1–03
- 1999 Loughforbes Gaels (Longford) 3-06 Clongeen (Wexford) 3–00
- 2000 Cuchulainns (Armagh) 10-07 Newry (Down) 1–02
- 2001 Erin's Own (Cork) 1-07 Carrignavar (Cork) 1–03
- 2002 Middletown (Armagh) 2-06 Keady Lámh Dhearg (Armagh) 1–04
- 2003 Blackhall Gaels (Meath) 2-06 Lough Lene Gaels (Westmeath) 1–02
- 2004 Kevin Lynch's (Derry)
- 2005 Valley Rovers (Cork)
- 2006 Glengariff (Antrim)
- 2007 Keady Lámh Dhearg (Armagh)
- 2008 Fenians (Kilkenny)
- 2009 Cuchulainns (Armagh)
- 2010 St. Brekans Lisdoonvarna (Clare)
- 2011 Pearse's (Galway)
- 2012 Padraig Pearses (Roscommon) 1-7 Eoghan Ruadh (Tyrone) 0–8
- 2013 Easkey (Sligo) 1-10 Buncrana (Donegal) 3–2
- 2014
- 2015
- 2016 Ballyhoura Gaels (Limerick) 2-06 Silvermines (Tipperary 1–02
- 2017
- 2018 Cois Fharraige (Galway) 0-05 CRC Gaels (Offaly) 1–04
- 2019 Tullamore (Offaly) 1-09 Clontarf (Dublin) 0–02
- 2020
- 2021
- 2022 Eire Og, Carrickmore (Tyrone) 1-06 Sean MacCumhaill (Donegal) 1–02
- 2023
- 2024 New York beat Carrickmacross Hurling (Monaghan)
- 2025

=== Hurling Division 5 winners (McMahon Trophy) ===
- 1988 Ballinamore-Durrow (Offaly) 3-05 Errill (Laois) 0–00
- 1989 Ballinkillen (Carlow) 1-05 Timahoe (Laois) 1–01
- 1990 Fr Sheehy's (Tipperary) 2-05 Aherlow (Tipperary) 2–01
- 1991 Sean Treacy's (Tipperary) 4-02 Newcastle (Tipperary) 1–02
- 1992 Castleblayney (Monaghan) 3-08 St. Mary's (Fermanagh) 0–02
- 1993 Mountbellew (Galway) 2-03 Dungannon Eoghan Ruadh (Tyrone) 1–02
- 1994 Glenroe (Limerick) 2-04 Pallaskenry (Limerick) 1–00
- 1995 Feenagh-Kilmeady (Limerick) 2-02 Dromcollogher-Broadford (Limerick) 1–01
- 1996 London selected 3-05 Warwickshire 1–01
- 1997 London selected 2-04 Kilrossanty 0-00(Waterford)
- 1998 Davidstown-Courtnacuddy (Wexford) 3-09 Oylegate-Glenbrien (Wexford) 2–01
- 1999 Bannow-Ballymitty (Wexford) 4-02 Ballygarrett (Wexford) 0–03
- 2000 Latton O'Rahilly (Monaghan) 3-04 London selected 1–03
- 2001 Not played
- 2002 London selected 5-07 Liatroim Fontenoys (Down) 4–02
- 2003 Mullahoran (Cavan) 5-04 Cullion (Westmeath) 2–03
- 2004 Gael Columcille (Meath)
- 2005 Glanworth (Cork)
- 2006 Cloyne (Cork)
- 2007 Conahy (Kilkenny)
- 2008 Setanta (Donegal)
- 2009 St Oliver Plunkett's (Westmeath)
- 2010 Naomh Eoin (Sligo)
- 2011 Mountbellew (Galway)
- 2012 Easkey (Sligo) 4-09 Raheny (Dublin) 1–03
- 2013 Monaghan Harps (Monaghan) 6-04 Lisbellaw (Fermanagh) 3–05
- 2014 Bray Emmets (Wicklow)
- 2015 St Fechins (Louth)2-08 Craobh Rua (Armagh) 1–04
- 2016 Michael Dwyers 4-04 Dungannon Eoghan Ruadh (Tyrone) 3–04
- 2017
- 2018
- 2019 Bandon (Cork) 4-08 Four Roads (Roscommon) 3–05
- 2020
- 2021
- 2022
- 2023
- 2024
- 2025

=== Hurling Division 6 winners (Lár Tíre Trophy) ===
- 1993 Crossmolina (Mayo) 2-02 London selection 2–01
- 1994 London selected 5-05 St. Patrick's (Limerick) 2–01
- 1995 Eoin Rua (Kilkenny) 3-02 Askeaton (Limerick) 2–03
- 1996-2005 Not played
- 2006 Butlerstown (Waterford)
- 2007 Windgap (Kilkenny)
- 2008 Coolera/Strandhill (Sligo)
- 2009 Ballinamore/Durrow (Offaly)
- 2010 Ballinamore Seán O'Heslin's (Leitrim)
- 2011 Sylane (Galway)
- 2012 Setanta (Dublin) 1-03 Cootehill (Cavan) 1–02
- 2013 St. Patricks 4-04 Naomh Moninne (Louth) 3–04
- 2014 Naomh Moninne (Louth)
- 2015 Annaghdown (Galway)
- 2016 An Gaeltacht 1-09 Rockwell/Rosegreen (Tipperary) 1–05
- 2017
- 2018
- 2019 Killeagh/St. Ita's 3-08 (Cork) Mullinavat (Kilkenny) 0–04
- 2020
- 2021
- 2022
- 2023
- 2024
- 2025

=== Camogie Division 1 winners ===
- 1974 Rathnure (Wexford) 5-00 Ahane (Limerick) 0–01
- 1975 Knockananna (Wicklow) 4-10 Croagh/Kilfinny (Limerick) 1–00
- 1976 Na Piarsaigh (Cork) 2-1 Thomastown (Kilkenny) 2–00
- 1977 Killeagh (Cork) 7-00 Enniskillen (Fermanagh) 0–00
- 1978 Croagh/Kilfinny (Limerick) 3-01 Marino (Dublin) 3–00
- 1979 Woodville (Dublin) 1-01 Blackrock (Cork) 0–00
- 1980 Woodville (Dublin) 3-02 Blacks and Whites (Kilkenny) 1–01
- 1981 Marino (Dublin) 1-04 Bishopstown (Cork) 1–03
- 1982 Marino (Dublin) 3-00 St Finbarr's (Cork) 1–03
- 1983 Sarsfields (Galway) 3-00 St Dominic's (Roscommon) 1–01
- 1984 An Caislean (Dublin) 3-02 Shamrocks (Kilkenny) 2–00
- 1985 Mullagh (Galway) 4-05 Marino (Dublin) 1–01
- 1986 Mullagh (Galway) 1-02 Bishopstown (Cork) 0–04
- 1987 Bishopstown (Cork) 2-03 St. Monica's (Dublin) 1–02
- 1988 Pearses (Galway) 4-05 Killeagh (Cork) 1–01
- 1989 St. Lachtain's (Kilkenny) 1-05 Pearses (Galway) 1–02
- 1990 St. Lachtain's (Kilkenny) 4-01 Killeagh (Cork) 0–07
- 1991 Granagh-Ballingarry (Limerick) 2-02 St Enda's (Dublin) 0–02
- 1992 Clara (Kilkenny) 6-01 Drom-Inch (Tipperary) 3–00
- 1993 Craughwell (Galway) 0-05 Ardrahan (Galway) 0–01
- 1994 Pearses (Galway) 1-09 St. Ibar's (Wexford) 0–04
- 1995 Pearses (Galway) 1-06 Drom-Inch (Tipperary) 0–03
- 1996 Templemore (Tipperary) 2-10 Courcey Rovers (Cork) 1–03
- 1997 Athenry (Galway) 2-05 Rathnure (Wexford) 0–04
- 1998 Oulart the Ballagh (Wexford) 4-06 Templemore (Tipperary) 4–05
- 1999 Oulart the Ballagh (Wexford) 2-03 Milford (Cork) 1–10
- 2000 Oulart the Ballagh (Wexford) 1-08 Davitts (Galway) 1–01
- 2001 Oulart the Ballagh (Wexford) 4-03 Harps (Laois) 3–4
- 2002 Oulart the Ballagh (Wexford) 2-05 Davitts (Galway) 0–01
- 2003 St Vincents (Dublin) 2-9 Douglas (Cork) 0–04
- 2004 Douglas (Cork) 3-4 Thomastown (Kilkenny) 2–01
- 2005 Douglas (Cork) 6-8 St Vincents (Dublin) 0-00
- 2006 Douglas (Cork) 2-03 Inniscarra (Cork) 1–02
- 2007 Sarsfields (Galway) 2-08 Milford (Cork) 1–03
- 2008 Lucan Sarsfields (Dublin) 2-03 Mullagh (Galway) 1-02
- 2009 Douglas (Cork) 1-07 St Vincents (Dublin) 2–02
- 2010 Lucan Sarsfields (Dublin) 6-04 Burgess Duharra (Tipperary) 0-2
- 2011 Cahir (Tipperary) 4-10 St Martin's Murrintown (Wexford) 1-07
- 2012 Newport/Ballinahinch (Tipperary) 3-03 Davitts, (Galway) 0-02
- 2013 Dicksboro (Kilkenny) 3-02 Nenagh Éire Óg (Tipperary) 1-01
- 2014 Loughgiel Shamrocks (Antrim) 3-03 Cashel King Cormacs Tipperary 1-05
- 2015 Loughgiel Shamrocks (Antrim)
- 2016 Sarsfields (Cork) 1-03 Thomastown (Kilkenny) 0–03
- 2017 Sarsfields (Cork)
- 2018 Sarsfields (Cork)
- 2019 Éire Óg (Cork) 0-05 Sarsfields (Cork) 0–02
- 2020 no competition
- 2021 no competition
- 2022
- 2023
- 2024 St Finians GAA (Dublin)
- 2025

=== Camogie Div 2 winners (Caithlín Ní Thoimín Shield) ===
- 1978 Johnstown (Kilkenny) 5-01 St Dominic's (Roscommon) 3–00
- 1979 Avoca (Wicklow) 6-01 St Dominic's (Roscommon) 0–00
- 1980 Oran (Roscommon) 7-02 Carrickcruppen (Armagh) 2–00
- 1981 Na Piarsaigh (Cork) 1-05 Davitts (Galway) 1–02
- 1982 Oran (Roscommon) 1-00 Balyna (Kildare) 0–01
- 1983 Crumlin (Dublin) 2-01 Letterkenny (Donegall) 0–01
- 1984 Annacurra (Wicklow) 3-02 Raharney (Westmeath) 2–00
- 1985 Carbury (Kd) 3-02 Drumcullen (Offaly) 1–02
- 1986 Keady Lámh Dhearg (Arm) 1-03 Aghabullogue (Cork) 1–00
- 1987 Keady Lámh Dhearg (Armagh) 2-03 Bunclody (Wexford) 1–02
- 1988 Wolfe Tones (Clare) 3-02 Newtownshandrum (Cork) 0–02
- 1989 Wolfe Tones (Clare) 2-20 O'Donovan Rossa (Anttrim)
- 1990 Granagh-Ballingarry (Limerick) 4-04 St. Ibar's (Wexford) 1–02
- 1991 Pearses (Galway) 1-05 Monageer-Boolavogue (Wexford) 1–01
- 1992 Davitts (Galway) 2-00 Marino (Dublin) 1–02
- 1993 HWH Bunclody (Wex) 7-01 St. Thomas (Galway) 0–00
- 1994 Drom-Inch (Tipperary) 4-09 Truagh Gaels (Limerick) 2–02
- 1995 Teemore (Fermanagh) 5-08 Inistioge (Kilkenny) 1–00
- 1996 Granagh-Ballingarry (Limerick) 2-06 Butlerstown (Waterford) 1–02
- 1997 St. Lachtain's (Kilkenny) 2-06 Butlerstown (Waterford) 1–02
- 1998 Wolfe Tones (Clare) 4-02 Shinrone (Offaly) 2–05
- 1999 Ballyboden St Endas (Dublin) 1-03 Harps (Laois) 0–01
- 2000 Harps (Laois) 5-02 Templemore (Tipperary) 4–01
- 2001 Kilnamona (Clare) 5-04 Bellaghy (Derry) 2–04
- 2002 Newmarket-on-Fergus (Clare) 3-02 Kinnitty (Offaly) 0–00
- 2003 Ballinascreen (Derry) 3-05 Tullamore (Offaly) 1–02
- 2004 Camross (Laois) 2-04 Newmarket-on-Fergus (Clare) 1–04
- 2005 Ballycastle (Antrim) 6-08 Buttevant (Cork) 1-08
- 2006 Ballycran (Down) 1-02 Ballinascreen (Derry) 1–01
- 2007 Ballinascreen (Derry) 2-02 Ballycran (Down) 0–03
- 2008 Michael Davitt's, Swatragh (Derry) 7-03 Lismore (Waterford) 0-01
- 2009 St Brenda's (Armagh) 2-04 O'Moore's (Laois) 2–02
- 2010 Éire Óg Ennis (Clare) 2-03 Camross (Laois) 1-01
- 2011 St. Cillian's (Offaly) 4-04 Sixmilebridge (Clare) 3-04
- 2012 Inagh/Kilnamona (Clare) 5-05 De La Salle (Waterford) 2-03
- 2013 Galltir (Waterford) 5-05 Portaferry (Down) 0–03
- 2014 Galltir (Waterford)
- 2015 St Rynagh's (Offaly)
- 2016 Wolfe Tones Bellaghy (Derry) 1-05 Ballina (Tipperary) 0–03
- 2017 Dicksboro (Kilkenny)
- 2018 Ballygalget (Down)
- 2019 Clonakilty (Cork) 2-05 Loughgiel Shamrocks (Antrim) 1–03
- 2020 No Competition
- 2021 No Competition
- 2022
- 2023
- 2024
- 2025 De La Salle (Waterford) 1-07 Geraldine, Portglenome (Antrim) 1-02

=== Camogie Div 3 winners ===
- 1983 Parke (Mayo) 2-05 Spa (Kerry) 1-05
- 1984 Leitrim Fontenoys (Down) 1-02 Parke (Mayo) 10–0
- 1995 St Mary's Rasharkin (Antrim) 5-04 Killarney (Kerry) 0-01
- 1986 Éire Óg Ennis (Clare) 2-00 Newtownbutler (Fermanagh) 1–00
- 1987 Wolfe Tones (Clare) 1-01 Loughgiel (Antrim) 0–00
- 1988 Burgess (Tipperary) 5-02 Raharney (Westmeath) 3–01
- 1989 Oran (Roscommon) 4-01 An Ríocht (Down) 3–03
- 1990 Portaferry (Down) 3-02 Kinnitty (Offaly) 3–01
- 1991 Naomh Moling (Carlow) 5-03 Oran (Roscommon) 5–00
- 1992 Oran (Roscommon) 2-02 Camross (Laois) 0–01
- 1993 Mountbellew (Galway) 5-00 Athenry (Galway) 0–01
- 1994 Teemore (Fermanagh) 2-04 Dunhill (Waterford) 0–01
- 1995 O'Donovan Rossa (Antrim) 1-06 Dunhill (Waterford) 1–02
- 1996 Ballyholland Harps (Down) 4-01 Cappagh (Kildare) 2–00
- 1997 Kinnitty (Offaly) 5-02 Teemore (Fermanagh) 2–04
- 1998 Harps (Laois) 3-10 Glynn-Barntown (Wexford) 0–02
- 1999 Granagh-Ballingarry (Limerick) 6-01 Oran (Roscommon) 1–00
- 2000 St. Lachtain's (Kilkenny) 1-02 Lismore (Waterford) 0–02
- 2001 Ballymacnab St. Brenda's (Armagh) 2-04 Enniskeane (Cork) 0–03
- 2002 Bellaghy (Derry) 3-01 Loughgiel (Antrim) 0–01
- 2003 Ballymacnab St Brenda's (Armagh) 9-06 Ballycran (Down) 0–01
- 2004 Ballycastle (Anttrim) 1-04 Kilcormac-Killoughey (Offaly) 1–01
- 2005 Killeagh (Cork) 6-08 Lismore (Waterford) 4-02
- 2006 Lismore (Waterford) 5-09 Newtownshandrum (Cork) 0–02
- 2007 Rower Innistioge (Kilkenny) 2-01 Keady Lámh Dhearg (Armagh) 1–00
- 2008 Ratoath (Meath) 3-01 Harps (Laois) 1-01
- 2009 Kerry Selected 3-01 Kiltale (Meath) 0–03
- 2010 Celbridge (Kildare) 5-01 Wolfe Tones (Clare) 1-01
- 2011 Knockananna (Wicklow) 3-04 Liam Mellows (Galway) 0-01
- 2012 Naas (Kildare) 3-02 Raharney (Westmeath) 0-03
- 2013 Raharney (Westmeath) 2-03 Ballinteer St. Johns (Dublin) 1–02
- 2014 Clonkill (Westmeath)
- 2015 Naomh Brid (Carlow)
- 2016 Naas (Kildare) 1-03 Myshall (Carlow) 1–01
- 2017 Naas (Kildare)
- 2018 The Harps (Laois)
- 2019 Ardrahan (Galway) 1-03 Na Fianna (Meath) 1–02
- 2020 no competition
- 2021 no competition
- 2022

=== Camogie Division 4 winners (Coiste Chontae an Chláir Shield) ===
- 1987 Tubberclair (Westmeath) 5-01 Killarney (Kerry) 1–00
- 1988 Ardagh (Mayo) Letterkenny (Donegal) 0–01
- 1989 Lismore (Waterford) 1-01 Oisins, Glenarriffe (Antrim) 0–01
- 1990 Toomevara (Tipperary) 3-05 Butlerstown (Waterford) 1–01
- 1991 Roscrea (Tipperary) 2-02 St Saviour's (Waterford) 1–02
- 1992 Cullion (Westmeath) 2-00 Mountbellew (Galway) 1–02
- 1993 Teemore (Fermanagh) 4-03 Dunhill (Waterford) 0–00
- 1994 Na Piarsaigh (Limerick) 2-0 Aughrim (Wicklow) 0–00
- 1995 Camross (Laois) 2-03 Burgess (Tipperary) 1–03
- 1996 Drumcullen (Offaly) 4-04 Castleblayney (Monaghan) 0–03
- 1997 Wolfe Tones (Clare) 3-6 Kildavin (Carlow) 0–00
- 1998 Butlerstown (Waterford) 3-08 Castleblayney (Monaghan) 0–01
- 1999 Kiltegan (Wicklow) 6-00 Robert Emmetts Slaughtneil (Derry) 2–01
- 2000 Johnstownbridge (Kildare) 3-01 Bendearg Ballygalget (Down) 0–02
- 2001-3 Not played
- 2004 Oran (Roscommon) 2-01 Naomh Bríd (Carlow) 0–02
- 2005 Not played
- 2006 Sarsfields (Cork) 5-00 Meath Selected 4–00
- 2007 Ratoath (Meath) 3-02 Kerry Selected 2-00
- 2008 Kerry Selected 3-01 Clonad (Laois) 0-0
- 2009 Na Brídeoga, Tooreen (Mayo) 5-03 Seir Kieran (Offaly) 0–01
- 2010 Cillard (Kerry) 4-05 Kilanena (Clare) 0-00
- 2011 St Colman's Gort (Galway) 2-02 St Joseph's Madden (Armagh) 0-06
- 2012 Clane (Kildare) 2-04 Bray Emmets (Wicklow) 1-00
- 2013 Ballina (Tipperary) 4-03 Na Piarsaigh (Limerick) 0–02
- 2014 Kilconieron (Galway)
- 2015 St. Brigid's (Laois)
- 2016 Cillard (Kerry) 2-07 Eglish (Tyrone) 2–04
- 2017 John Lockes (Kilkenny)
- 2018 O'Moore's (Laois)
- 2019 Moycarkey (Tipperary) 2-02 Mallow 1–04
- 2020 no competition
- 2021 no competition
- 2022
- 2023
- 2024
- 2025

=== Camogie Division 5 winners ===
- 1995 Kildavin (Carlow) 0-02 Glenealy (Wicklow) 0–00
- 2011 Kilanena (Clare) 10-05 Kinvara (Galway) 1-00
- 2013 Kilmaley (Clare) 3-03 Eire Óg, Ennis (Clare) 0-02
- 2014 Sligo Selection
- 2015 Cois Fharraige (Galway)
- 2016 J.K. Brackens (Tipperary) 4-04 San Francisco 2-00
- 2017 Na Brideoga (Mayo)
- 2018 Causeway (Kerry)
- 2019 Ballyhea/Milford (Cork) 1-08 Causeway (Kerry) 0–04
- 2020 no competition
- 2021 no competition
- 2022

=== Camogie Division 6 winners ===
- 2017 Cillard (Kerry)
- 2018 Skehana/Menlough (Galway)
- 2019 Four Roads (Roscommon) 3-01 Nemo Rangers (Cork) 1–02
- 2020 no competition
- 2021 no competition
- 2022

=== Camogie Division 7 winners ===
- 2017 Paulstown/Corebridge (Kilkenny)
- 2018 Longford Slashers (Longford)

== Camogie Skills winners ==
- 1978 Deirdre O’Shea (Cork)
- 1979 Deirdre O’Shea (Cork)
- 1980 Marie Fitzpatrick (Kilkenny)
- 1981 Anne Ryan (Galway)
- 1982 Ann Wolfe (Dublin)
- 1983 Jean Paula Kent (Cork)
- 1984 Yvonne McInerney (Clare)
- 1985 Helen Cagney (Limerick)
- 1986 Michelle Cameron (Dublin)
- 1987 Claire Lynch (Galway)
- 1988 Bridget Mullally (Kilkenny)
- 1989 Nora O’Connell (Cork)
- 1990 Triona Maher (Tipperary)
- 1991 Vivienne Harris (Cork)
- 1992 Maeve Kearns (Galway)
- 1993 Michelle Casey (Limerick)
- 1994 Emma Galvin (Waterford)
- 1995 Liz Fowler (Waterford)
- 1996 Niamh Harkin (Tipperary)
- 1997 Nikki Keddy (Wicklow)
- 1998 Aoife Sheehan (Limerick)
- 1999 Cathy Bowes (Galway)
- 2000 Charlene Fanthrope (Armagh)
- 2001 Sarah Dervan (Galway)
- 2002 Grainne O’Higgins (Down)
- 2003 Claire Coulter (Down)
- 2004 Patricia Jackman (Waterford)
- 2005 Racquel McCarry (Antrim)
- 2006 Caroline Scanlon (Limerick)
- 2009 Grainne Sheehy (Cork)
- 2010 Caoimhe Costelloe (Limerick)
- 2011 Lauren Tuohy (Clare)
- 2012 Aoife Corcoran (Westmeath)
