= Liam Doyle (hurler) =

Irish former sportsperson (born 1968)

Personal information
- Native name: Liam Ó Dúil (Irish)
- Nickname: The horse
- Born: 1968 (age 57–58) Bodyke, County Clare, Ireland

Sport
- Sport: Hurling
- Position: Right wing-back
Club
- Years: Club
- Bodyke
Club titles
- Clare titles: 0
Inter-county
- Years: County
- 1989-2002: Clare
Inter-county titles
- Munster titles: 3
- All-Irelands: 2
- NHL: 0
- All Stars: 1

Liam Doyle (born 1968) is an Irish hurling coach and former player. At club level he played with Bodyke and at inter-county level with the Clare senior hurling team. Doyle later served as a manager and selector.

== Playing career ==
Doyle first appeared on the inter-county scene with Clare as goalkeeper on the minor team in 1986. He later spent three successive years with the under-21 team. Doyle was drafted onto the senior team in 1989 and played for a number of seasons before drifting away in 1991.

Doyle's inter-county career was restarted in 1993 when, as part of the Clare junior team, he won an All-Ireland JHC medal after a defeat of Kilkenny in the final. He was recalled to the senior team for the 1993–94 league. Doyle was part of the Clare team that bridged a 63-year gap to win the Munster SHC title in 1995. He later claimed an All-Ireland SHC medal after clare beat Offaly to claim the title for the first time in 81 years. Doyle ended the season by being named on the All-Star team.

At club level, Doyle won a Clare IHC medal with Bodyke in 1996. This was a decade after claiming a Clare JAHC medal following a defeat of Éire Óg. Doyle won a second Munster SHC title in 1997, before claiming a second All-Ireland SHC winners' medal after a defeat of Tipperary in the 1997 All-Ireland final. He won a third Munster SHC medal in four seasons in 1998. Doyle's performances also earned inclusion on the Munster team and he won Railway Cup medals in 1996 and 1997. He retired from inter-county hurling in May 2002.

== Management career ==
Doyle was still lining out at club level with Bodyke when he trained the Smith O'Brien's club to the Clare IHC title in 2004. He later replaced Liam Sheedy as coach of the Sixmilebridge team in 2007. Doyle also spent two years as a selector as part of Ger O'Loughlin's Clare senior hurling management team.

== Honours ==
=== Player ===
Bodyke

- Clare Intermediate Hurling Championship: 1996
- Clare Junior A Hurling Championship: 1986

Clare

- All-Ireland Senior Hurling Championship: 1995, 1997
- Munster Senior Hurling Championship: 1995, 1997
- All-Ireland Junior Hurling Championship: 1993
- Munster Junior Hurling Championship: 1993

Munster

- Railway Cup: 1996, 1997

=== Management ===
Smith O'Briens

- Clare Intermediate Hurling Championship: 2004
