= Clare Senior Camogie Championship =

Annual club camogie competition

- Current season or competition: 2026 Clare Senior Camogie Championship
- Code: Camogie
- Founded: 1959; 67 years ago
- Region: Clare (GAA)
- Trophy: McMahon Cup
- No. of teams: 10
- Title holders: Truagh-Clonlara (3rd title)
- Most titles: Éire Óg (12 titles)
- Official website: Official website

The Clare Senior Camogie Championship is an annual Camogie competition contested by the 10 top ranking Camogie teams in County Clare, Ireland.

Games are played during the summer and autumn months with the county final currently being played in October. The prize for the winning team is the McMahon Cup. The championship currently features a group stage followed by a knock-out stage.

The Clare County Championship is part of the Munster Senior Club Camogie Championship. The winners of the Clare County Final join the senior champions of the other counties to contest the provincial championship.

The 2026 Clare Senior Camogie Championship was won by Truagh-Clonlara after beating Kilmaley 0–16 to 1–08 in the final.

== History ==
In the early 1930s Mick Hennessy from Clooney and secretary of Clare County GAA Board noticed that Clare lagged behind other counties in organising Camogie. He promoted Camogie in his own club first and in 1933 the Clooney Camogie Club was founded, being the first club in Clare. Hennessy used his influence to encourage other clubs to establish Camogie clubs. This allowed to set up a County Board in 1934 with delegates from 8 clubs and the start of a league in the same year.

While Camogie almost ceased to exist in the early 1950s, the Clare Senior Camogie Championship was established in 1959 and played ever since.

Initially, the championship saw long stretches of dominance. First by an eight-in-a-row of Killanena, followed by 12 titles in 14 years by Éire Óg and a subsequent nine-in-a-row by Sixmilebridge. From the 1990s onwards the championship was more contested and in total 11 teams were able to win at least 1 Clare Senior Camogie Championship.

In 2019 Scariff Ogonnelloe became the first team from Clare to win the Munster Senior Club Camogie Championship. Scariff Ogonnelloe managed to win it again in 2021.

In 2024 Truagh Clonlara went one step further by first winning the Munster Senior Club Camogie Championship and then reaching the All-Ireland Final.

== Format ==
As of 2026 10 teams are divided into 2 groups of 5. The teams play each team in their group. 3 points are awarded for a win and 1 for a draw.

The top 2 teams of both groups qualify for the semi-finals.

The 2 teams winning the semi-finals contest the county final to determine the Senior A champion.

The teams placed 3rd and 4th play Shield semi-finals.

The 2 winners play the Shield finals.

== Teams ==
=== 2026 teams ===
The 10 teams competing in the 2026 Clare Senior Camogie Championship were:

Club	Position in 2026	Championship titles	Last championship title
Truagh Clonlara	Champion	3	2026
Kilmaley	Runners-up	4	2014
Inagh/Kilnamona	Semi-Final	4	2020
Scariff Ogonnelloe	Semi-Final	3	2022
Newmarket on Fergus	Shield winner	8	2015
Clooney Quin	Shield Runners-up	0	–
Tulla	Shield Semi-Final	0	–
Feakle/Killanena	Shield Semi-Final	9	1967
Clarecastle/Ballyea		0	–
St Joseph's Doora Barefield		0	–

== Qualification for subsequent competitions ==
The Clare Senior Camogie Championship winners qualify for the subsequent Munster Senior Club Camogie Championship.

== Roll of honour ==
Club	Titles	Years won
Éire Óg	12	1968, 69, 70, 71, 72, 73, 74, 75, 78, 79, 80, 81
Killanena	9	1959, 60, 61, 62, 63, 64, 65, 66, 67
Sixmilebridge	9	1982, 83, 84, 85, 86, 87, 88, 89, 90
Wolfe Tones	9	1976, 77, 91, 92, 93, 94, 95, 97, 2000
Newmarket on Fergus	8	2001, 02, 03, 05, 10, 11, 13, 15
Inagh/Kilnamona	5	2016, 17, 18, 20,25
Kilmaley	4	2008, 09, 12, 14
Kilnamona	4	1999, 04, 06, 07
Scariff Ogonnelloe	3	2019, 21, 22
Truagh Clonlara	3	2023, 24, 26
Bodyke	2	1996, 98

== List of finals ==
Year	Champion	Score	Runners-Up	Score	Source
2026	Truagh Clonlara	0-16	Kilmaley	1-08	
2025	Inagh/Kilnamona	2-14	Truagh Clonlara	1-14	
2024	Truagh Clonlara	2-11	Inagh/Kilnamona	2-07	
2023	Truagh Clonlara	2-11	Scariff Ogonnelloe	1-13	
2022	Scariff Ogonnelloe	0-14	Truagh Clonlara	2-05	
2021	Scariff Ogonnelloe	1-14, 1–12	Truagh Clonlara	3-08, 0-08	
2020	Inagh/Kilnamona	2-17	Newmarket on Fergus	1-07	
2019	Scariff Ogonnelloe	1-12	Newmarket on Fergus	2-03	
2018	Inagh/Kilnamona	2-07	Newmarket on Fergus	0-09	
2017	Inagh/Kilnamona	2-08	Newmarket on Fergus	1-10	
2016	Inagh/Kilnamona		Newmarket on Fergus		
2015	Newmarket on Fergus				
2014	Kilmaley	4-18	Clooney Quin	2-05	
2013	Newmarket on Fergus				
2012	Kilmaley		Clooney Quin		
2011	Newmarket on Fergus				
2010	Newmarket on Fergus				
2009	Kilmaley				
2008	Kilmaley				
2007	Kilnamona				
2006	Kilnamona				
2005	Newmarket on Fergus				
2004	Kilnamona				
2003	Newmarket on Fergus				
2002	Newmarket on Fergus				
2001	Newmarket on Fergus		Kilnamona		
2000	Wolfe Tones				
1999	Kilnamona				
1998	Bodyke				
1997	Wolfe Tones				
1996	Bodyke				
1995	Wolfe Tones				
1994	Wolfe Tones				
1993	Wolfe Tones				
1992	Wolfe Tones				
1991	Wolfe Tones				
1990	Sixmilebridge				
1989	Sixmilebridge				
1988	Sixmilebridge				
1987	Sixmilebridge				
1986	Sixmilebridge				
1985	Sixmilebridge				
1984	Sixmilebridge				
1983	Sixmilebridge				
1982	Sixmilebridge				
1981	Éire Óg				
1980	Éire Óg				
1979	Éire Óg				
1978	Éire Óg				
1977	Wolfe Tones				
1976	Wolfe Tones				
1975	Éire Óg				
1974	Éire Óg				
1973	Éire Óg				
1972	Éire Óg				
1971	Éire Óg				
1970	Éire Óg				
1969	Éire Óg				
1968	Éire Óg				
1967	Killanena				
1966	Killanena				
1965	Killanena				
1964	Killanena				
1963	Killanena				
1962	Killanena				
1961	Killanena				
1960	Killanena				
1959	Killanena				

== See also ==
Munster Senior Club Camogie Championship

All Ireland Senior Club Camogie Championship
