= 1997 All-Ireland Senior Hurling Championship final =

1997 All-Ireland Hurling Final
- Event: 1997 All-Ireland Senior Hurling Championship
Clare	Tipperary
0-20	2-13
- Date: 14 September 1997
- Venue: Croke Park, Dublin
- Man of the Match: Ollie Baker (Clare)
- Referee: Dickie Murphy (Wexford)
- Attendance: 65,575

The 1997 All-Ireland Senior Hurling Championship Final was held on 14 September 1997 and contested between Clare and Tipperary. It was a historic occasion in the history of the championship as it was the first time that two counties from the same province were appearing in the championship decider. Both sides had already met during the year in the Munster final when Clare defeated Tipperary. Clare had last won the All-Ireland title two years earlier in 1995 when they defeated Offaly while Tipperary last claimed the championship title in 1991 when they beat Kilkenny.

== Match ==
=== Officials ===
On 26 August 1997 the officials were chosen for the final by the GAA, led by Wexford referee Dickie Murphy. The linesmen for the match were Pat Delaney (Laois) and Tom McIntyre (Antrim). Murphy was one of the most highly regarded match officials and had already taken charge of the 1992 and 1995 All-Ireland deciders.

=== Summary ===
At 3:30pm Dickie Murphy of Wexford threw in the sliotar and a much talked about game got under way. In fact, the game turned out to be one of the best of the decade. Tipperary had a good breeze behind them for the opening thirty-five minutes; however, they struggled to find their feet. After a tough opening quarter Tipp's wind advantage only resulted in a 0-3 to 0-2 lead. The Tipperary team eventually found their groove as Declan Ryan and John Leahy fired over some more points and by the twenty-fifth minute they were five points ahead. Tipp forged ahead and looked towards building a match-winning lead by half-time. Clare rallied and a brilliant two-minute spell yielded three unanswered points, two of which came from All-Ireland debutante Niall Gilligan. He was giving star defender Paul Shelly an unexpected torrid time during the first half. At half-time Tipperary were ahead by 0-10 to 0-6, however, Clare were in the ascendancy.

Within fifteen seconds of the restart Liam Doyle, one of Clare's unsung heroes, sent over another great point. Three Clare points followed in quick succession over the next six minutes before a Colin Lynch effort leveled the game at 0-11 apiece. The Clare management then brought on David Forde in a move that would prove most beneficial. He entered the game as a right corner-forward; however, he proceeded to roam all over the forward line. The decision by his marker, Michael Ryan, not to follow him proved costly as Forde quickly sent over two quick points before setting up a third to give Clare a 0-17 to 0-12 lead with ten minutes left in the game. It looked as if Clare were going to run away with the title, however, there were a few more twists in store. Substitute Liam Cahill put Tipp back in the game with an opportunist goal, kicking the ball to the net after catching a high ball. With four minutes left in the match teenager Eugene O'Neill doubled on a free that had come back off the crossbar and sent the sliotar into the net. Tipp had taken a 2-13 to 0-18 lead as the game entered the dying minutes. Ollie Baker leveled the scores after landing a huge point before Colin Lynch found Jamesie O'Connor on the right-hand side and fifty yards out from goal. O'Connor's effort flew straight over the bar and landed in the hand of team manager Ger Loughnane who was standing behind the goalposts. With seconds remaining in the game Tipperary launched one final attack. A great pass from Brian O'Meara found John Leahy in front of the Clare goal. A point would have resulted in a draw; however, Leahy went for broke and sent a low shot in towards the bottom of the net. Goalkeeper Davy FitzGerald saved the shot and cleared the sliotar. With that the full-time whistle was blown and Clare were the champions with a 0-20 to 2-13 victory.

== Statistics ==
14 September
Final

Clare	0-20 – 2-13	Tipperary
J. O'Connor (0-7), N. Gilligan (0-3), O. Baker (0-2), C. Lynch (0-2), D. Forde (0-2), S. McMahon (0-1), G. O'Loughlin (0-1), C. Clancy (0-1), L. Doyle (0-1).	Report	T. Dunne (0-5), E. O'Neill (1-1), J. Leahy (0-4), L. Cahill (1-0), M. Cleary (0-1), C. Gleeson (0-1), B. O'Meara (0-1).

Croke Park, Dublin
Attendance: 65,575
Referee: D. Murphy (Wexford)

Clare	Tipperary

MATCH RULES

- 70 minutes.
- Replay if scores level.
- Three named substitutes
