= 2025 Clare Premier Intermediate Hurling Championship =

Annual hurling competition season

Paddy Browne Cup 2025
- League: Clare GAA
- Sport: Hurling
- Duration: 25 July - 19 October 2025
- Teams: 10
- Sponsor: TUS Midlands Midwest

Changes From 2024
- Promoted: [NA]
- Relegated: [Ogonnoloe, Inagh/Kilnamona, Newmarket-on-Fergus, Broadford, Smith O'Briens, St Joseph's Doora Barefield]

Changes For 2026
- Promoted: O'Callaghan's Mills
- Relegated: Killanena

County Championship
- Winners: O'Callaghan's Mills
- Runners-up: Clarecastle
- Finals venue: Cusack Park

Seasons
- 2026 →

The 2025 TUS Clare Premier Intermediate Hurling Championship was the first staging of the competition, competing for the Paddy Browne Cup, which was previously awarded to the Intermediate champions in Clare. It is the 2nd tier of hurling in the county.

The draws for the 2025 Clare club championship group stages took place on 20 May 2025. The championship was contested by 10 teams. The group stage was in a round-robin format, with each team playing each team in their group once.

The quarter-finals were played between the 2nd placed team in Group 1 vs 3rd placed team in Group 2, and vice versa. The group winners went straight through to the semi finals, for an open draw. The relegation final were played between the last-place teams of each group, with the losers of this to determine the relegated team.

The draws for the semi final took place on 21 September 2025.

The final was scheduled for 19 October 2025

== Premier Intermediate Championship Fixtures ==
=== Group stage ===
- 2 groups of 5
- Each team plays all the other teams in their group once. Two points are awarded for a win and one for a draw.
- In cases where two or more teams are on equal points, only the matches between the relevant teams are used to calculate the score difference when determining placement in the group.
  - The top progresses straight to the semi finals.
  - 2nd and 3rd place progress to the quarter finals
  - The bottom-placed team from each group contest the Relegation Playoffs

==== Group 1 ====
Semi-Finalist Quarter-Finalist Relegation Final

| Teams | Pld | W | D | L | F | A | Diff | Pts |
|---|---|---|---|---|---|---|---|---|
| O'Callaghans Mills | 4 | 3 | 1 | 0 | 109 | 80 | +29 | 7 |
| Tubber | 4 | 3 | 0 | 1 | 92 | 66 | +26 | 6 |
| Tulla | 4 | 1 | 2 | 1 | 80 | 82 | -2 | 4 |
| Parteen-Meelick | 4 | 1 | 0 | 3 | 75 | 91 | -16 | 2 |
| Killanena | 4 | 0 | 1 | 3 | 71 | 108 | -37 | 1 |

| Thursday 24 July 2025 Round 1 | Tulla | 1-16 (19) - 1-21 (24) | Tubber | Clarecastle |
| | | | | Referee: Niall Malone |

| Friday 25th Jul 2025 Round 1 | O'Callaghan's Mills | 2-32 (38) - 1-14 (17) | Killanena | Scariff |
| | | | | Referee: Pat Healy |

| Sunday 10th Aug 2025 Round 2 | Tulla | 1-18 (21) - 0-18 (18) | Parteen-Meelick | Broadford |
| | | | | Referee: Gus Callaghan |

| Sunday 10th Aug 2025 Round 2 | O'Callaghan's Mills | 0-24 (24) - 1-19 (22) | Tubber | Clarecastle |
| | | | | Referee: Johnny Healy |

| Friday 22nd Aug 2025 Round 3 | Tulla | 1-16 (19) - 0-19 (19) | O'Callaghan's Mills | Clonlara |
| | | | | Referee: Kevin Corry |

| Sunday 24th Aug 2025 Round 3 | Parteen-Meelick | 2-19 (25) - 1-17 (20) | Killanena | Bodyke |
| | | | | Referee: Pat Healy |

| Friday 29th Aug 2025 Round 4 | Parteen-Meelick | 0-10 (10) - 0-22 (22) | Tubber | Gurteen |
| | | | | Referee: Johnny Healy |

| Sunday 31st Aug 2025 Round 4 | Tulla | 1-18 (21) - 1-18 (21) | Killanena | Bodyke |
| | | | | Referee: Fergal O'Brien |

| Saturday 6th Sep 2025 Round 5 | Killanena | 0-13 (13) - 0-24 (24) | Tubber | Ruan |
| | | | | Referee: Pat Healy |

| Saturday 6th Sep 2025 Round 5 | O'Callaghan's Mills | 3-19 (28) - 2-16 (22) | Parteen-Meelick | Cratloe |
| | | | | Referee: Jim Hickey |

==== Group 2 ====
Semi-Finalist Quarter-Finalist Relegation Final

| Team | Pld | W | D | L | F | A | Diff | Pts |
|---|---|---|---|---|---|---|---|---|
| Whitegate | 4 | 3 | 0 | 1 | 89 | 83 | +6 | 6 |
| Ruan | 4 | 2 | 1 | 1 | 85 | 82 | +3 | 5 |
| Clarecastle | 4 | 2 | 0 | 2 | 89 | 79 | +10 | 4 |
| Sixmilebridge | 4 | 1 | 1 | 2 | 85 | 92 | -7 | 3 |
| Bodyke | 4 | 1 | 0 | 3 | 84 | 96 | -12 | 2 |

| Saturday 26th Jul 2025 Round 1 | Clarecastle | 1-22 (25) - 0-17 (17) | Whitegate | Bodyke |
| | | | | Referee: Jarlath Donnellan |

| Sunday 27th Jul 2025 Round 1 | Ruan | 1-20 (23) - 3-14 (23) | Sixmilebridge | Cratloe |
| | | | | Referee: Gus Callaghan |

| Friday 8th Aug 2025 Round 2 | Ruan | 2-15 (21) - 2-18 (24) | Whitegate | Tulla |
| | | | | Referee: Pat Healy |

| Saturday 9th Aug 2025 Round 2 | Clarecastle | 3-21 (30) - 2-14 (20) | Bodyke | Sixmilebridge |
| | | | | Referee: Ger Hoey |

| Friday 22nd Aug 2025 Round 3 | Clarecastle | 1-13 (26) - 0-20 (20) | Ruan | Gurteen |
| | | | | Referee: Johnny Healy |

| Friday 22nd Aug 2025 Round 3 | Bodyke | 1-23 (26) - 3-13 (22) | Sixmilebridge | Broadford |
| | | | | Referee: Ger Hoey |

| Friday 29th Aug 2025 Round 4 | Clarecastle | 1-15 (18) - 1-19 (22) | Sixmilebridge | Shannon |
| | | | | Referee: Jim Hickey |

| Tuesday 2nd Sep 2025 Round 4 | Bodyke | 0-19 (19) - 1-20 (23) | Whitegate | Tulla |
| | | | | Referee: Niall Malone |

| Sunday 7th Sep 2025 Round 5 | Ruan | 0-21 (21) - 2-13 (19) | Bodyke | Gurteen |
| | | | | Referee: Johnny Healy |

| Sunday 7th Sep 2025 Round 5 | Sixmilebridge | 1-15 (18) - 0-25 (25) | Whitegate | Broadford |
| | | | | Referee: Jim Hickey |

=== Quarter-finals ===
- Played by the 2nd placed team vs 3rd placed team in each group

| Friday 19th Sep 2025 - 17:30 Quarter-Final | Ruan | 1-20 (23) - 2-16 (22) | Tulla | Clarecastle |
| | Scorers Ruan: A Lynch (0-10 7f), R Mounsey (0-3 2f), S Punch (1-0), R Power (0-2), FLyons (0-2), B Roughan (0-1), P O'Halloran (0-1), J Cullinan (0-1) | Report | Scorers Tulla: S Withycombe (1-9 7f), C Corbett (0-4), D Corry (1-0), E Mulcahy (0-1), ÉCulloo (0-1), R Molloy (0-1) | Referee: Joe Mullins |

| Saturday 20th Sep 2025 - 14:00 Quarter-Final | Tubber | 0-22 (22) - 4-19 (31) | Clarecastle | Ruan |
| | L O'Grady (0-10 4f 3'65), O Dunford (0-4), C Droney (0-2), C Earley (0- 2), S Dunford (0-2), R Monahan (0-1), M Brennan (0-1). | Report | P O'Connell (0-10 8f), C Halpin (2-1), C Brigdale (0-3), R O'Connell (0-3), C Ralph (1-0), J Brack (1-0), C Whelan (0-2), H Doherty (0-1). | Referee: Niall Malone |

=== Semi-finals ===
| 4th October 2025 Semi-Final | Whitegate | 1-08 (11) - 3-17 (26) | Clarecastle | Dr Daly Park, Tulla |
| | R Hayes (1-2) D Hynes (0-3) C Whelan (0-2 2f) K Fahy (0-1) | Report | P O’Connell (1-7 5f) J Doherty (2-2) O Whelan (0-3 1SC) C Galvin (0-2) C Halpin (0-2) R O’Connell (0-1). | Referee: Kevin Corry |

| 4th October 2025 Semi-Final | O'Callaghan's Mills | 2-22 (28) - 0-15 (15) | Ruan | Gurteen |
| | J Loughnane (0-9 9f), S Boyce (1-2), C Murphy (0-3), D Moroney (0-3), C Cleary (1-0), G Cooney (0-2), F Hickey (0-2), C Henry (0-1) | Report | R Mounsey (0-4 1f), S Punch (0-3), A Lynch (0-3), P O’Halloran (0-2), F Lyons (0-2), J McDonagh (0-1). | Referee: Niall Malone |

=== County Final ===
| 19 October 2025 Final | O'Callaghan's Mills | 2-19 (25) - 1-16 (19) | Clarecastle | Cusack Park, Ennis |
| | J Loughnane (1-4 3f), G Cooney (1-2), D Moroney (0-4), S Boyce (0-3), C Murphy (0-2), A Fawl (0-2), A O’Gorman (0-1), C Henry (0-1) | Report | H Doherty (1-3), P O’Connell (0-4 4f), C Galvin (0-3 1f 1’65), O Whelan (0-2), C Whelan (0-1), R O’Connell (0-1), C Brigdale (0-1), D Healy (0-1) | Referee: Niall Malone |

=== Relegation Playoffs ===
- Played by the bottom placed teams from Groups 1 and 2
  - The loser of the relegation final is relegated to the Intermediate Championship for the 2026 season

| Saturday 27th Sep 2025 - 14:00 Relegation Final | Bodyke | 3-15 (24) - 2-10 (16) | Killanena | Whitegate |
| | | | | Referee: Fergal O'Brien |
