= Michael Dwyer (disambiguation) =

Michael Dwyer (1772–1825) was a Society of the United Irishmen leader in the 1798 rebellion.

Michael or Mike Dwyer may also refer to:

- Michael Dwyer (journalist) (1951–2010), Irish film critic and journalist
- Michael Dwyer (Canadian politician) (1879–1953), businessman and political figure in Nova Scotia, Canada
- Michael Dwyer (North Dakota politician) (born 1952), member of the North Dakota Senate
- Michael Martin Dwyer (1984–2009), Irishman killed by Bolivian police
- Michael F. Dwyer (1847–1906), American businessman and racehorse owner
- Michael Middleton Dwyer (born 1954), American architect
- Mike Dwyer (ice hockey) (born 1957), Canadian ice hockey player
- Mike Dwyer (American football) (born 1963), American football player
- Mike Dwyer (athlete) (born 1962), Canadian sprinter

== See also ==
- Michael Dwyers (disambiguation)
