= Éire Óg, Inis GAA =

Gaelic games club in County Clare, Ireland

- Founded: 1952
- County: Clare
- Nickname: The Town; Townies
- Colours
- Grounds: Clonroadmore, Ennis
- Coordinates: 52°49′54.6312″N 8°59′26.754″W

Playing kits
Regular Kit	Change Kit

Senior Club Championships
	All Ireland	Munster champions	Clare champions
Football:	-	-	23
Hurling:	-	0	16
Camogie:	-	0	12

Éire Óg, Inis GAA is a GAA club based in Ennis, County Clare, Ireland. The club plays gaelic football, hurling, camogie, and ladies football at all age levels.

Prior to the official club formation in 1952, Ennis Dalcassians represented the county capital.

Numerous times in the past, players from neighbours and local rivals, Doora-Barefield, accepted invitations to join up with the club as Ennis Faughs. Both clubs were individually competing at lower levels at these times, so it was seen as an opportunity for them to play at higher levels. Ennis Faughs competed in eight senior football finals, winning five senior football titles in 1947, 1948, 1952, 1954 and 1994. Ennis Faughs also won a senior hurling title in 1890, an intermediate hurling title in 1945, an intermediate football title in 1946, and a junior A football title in 1968.

In 2018 the club achieved a historic Junior A "Double" when their second-string teams won both the Clare Junior A Football Championship and Clare Junior A Hurling Championship.

In 2024 Shane O'Donnell won the Hurler of the Year along with his third consecutive All Star.

In 2025 the club completed a historic first Senior "Double" for the town of Ennis in ninety-six years and emulated their predecessors, Ennis Dalcassians, from 1890, 1911, 1914 and 1929.

When combined with their predecessors, Ennis Dalcassians, the club are the most successful club in Clare at senior level. A combined total of thirty-eight county senior titles have been won by the capital town - twenty-two senior football titles (2025), and sixteen senior hurling titles (2025).

Their most recent major achievements came in October 2025, when the club ended a thirty-five-year famine to win the Clare Senior Hurling Championship for the sixteenth time, defeating Clooney-Quin by 0-17 to 0-12 at Cusack Park in Ennis. Seven days later, the club completed the Senior "Double" when they defeated their neighbours and local rivals, Doora-Barefield, by 1-16 to 2-06 at Cusack Park in Ennis to win their fourth Clare Senior Football Championship in five years, and move one clear of Kilrush Shamrocks at the top of the Clare SFC Roll of Honour with twenty-two titles.

== Club History ==
The club as it is today was formed at the end of February 1952, initially to cater for junior hurlers. The historic first meeting took place in a house in Steele's Terrace, Ennis. To signify the change in name and set up, the club's first official colours were all-white with a green shamrock on the jersey, differing from the traditional blue and white of the Ennis Dalcassians. The club's first set of jerseys were purchased by the residents of Steele's Terrace and the boreen behind it. In 1954 the club colours were officially changed to today's red and white.

In 1974 the club took complete control over the organisation of gaelic games in Ennis when it merged Ennis Rovers, St. John's, Ennis and Turnpike, Ennis to form one combined club for the town. Ennis Rovers had won the 1927 intermediate hurling title, and lost the 1938 intermediate hurling final. Turnpike had lost the 1951 and 1956 intermediate hurling finals. St. John's had won the 1958 intermediate hurling title. A large number of the 1966 senior winning team had been successful at underage with these clubs, which had won five minor A hurling titles in between 1961 and 1966, and a three-in-a-row of under-21 A hurling titles from 1964–1966. The underage club has been hugely successful since this merger, winning titles at every grade in both hurling and football, the highlight being the Féile na nGael All-Ireland U-14 hurling title, which was captured by the club's Under-14s in Wexford in 1999.

In 1975 Éire Óg purchased land from St Flannan's College at Clonroadmore, where the club is based to this day. Since then, a lot of money and hard work has gone into pitch development, building a clubhouse and dressing rooms, and the addition of a floodlit all-weather pitch. In 2003 a second playing pitch was developed under a lease arrangement with St Flannan's College. In 2020 a 200-seat spectator stand and two permanent dugouts were constructed. The club is now in the initial stages of fundraising for a complete reconstruction of the clubhouse and dressing rooms, as well as a new state-of-the-art gym.

Éire Óg Inis Academy was set up in 2012 following the break-up of the Ennis Urban Board. The academy coaches girls and boys from U-6 to U-17 in the skills of both hurling and gaelic football. The academy's most successful year to date was in 2017 when they won five county titles and also represented Clare in the Féile na nGael. However, the success of the academy is not measured on county titles alone, as the most important goal is that the children enjoy coming to the club and enjoying a friendly, fun and safe environment.

=== Gaelic Football ===
When the club was formed in 1952, they continued with the agreement that Ennis Dalcassians had to compete in the senior championship with the help of Doora-Barefield players. Ennis Faughs won four senior football titles in 1947, 1948, 1952 and 1954. In 1971 the club fielded its first football team and went on to the junior A football title in 1975. The intermediate football title was later won in 1985. In 1986 the club reached the Clare Senior Football Championship final for the first time but were beaten by Cooraclare.

In late 1992 the club once again reached out to its neighbours Doora-Barefield to reform Ennis Faughs as both clubs were competing at intermediate level. Ennis Faughs won the Clare Senior Football Championship in 1994 after a replay against Kilrush Shamrocks. In 1995 they reached back-to-back senior football final, losing out to Doonbeg. When the club won the Clare Intermediate Football Championship on their own in 1995, thereby earning promotion to senior level for 1996, Ennis Faughs were again disbanded.

The club won five minor A football titles between 1992 and 1999, including a three-in-a-row. In 2000 the club's senior football team came of age when they won the Clare Senior Football Championship for the first time, beating Doonbeg in the county final. The senior hurling team who were also in the county final lost out to Sixmilebridge. A month later the club also won its first Clare Under-21 A Football Championship. In 2001 the club reached back-to-back senior football finals, however Doonbeg reversed the result. The club's second team won the junior A football title and went on to reach the Munster Junior Club Football Championship final for the first time, where they lost out to St. Michael's, Foilmore of Kerry. In 2003 the club won the Cusack Cup for the first time since Ennis Dalcassians in 1932, defeating Ennistymon by 2-11 to 1-08.

In 2004 the club lost the senior football final after a replay to Kilmurry Ibrickane. In 2006 the club won its eighteen overall senior football title, defeating Lissycasey by 2–09 to 0-13. In 2007 the club reached back-to-back senior football finals for the third time, however Lissycasey reversed the result. The club lost two consecutive Cusack Cup finals to Kilmurry Ibrickane in 2013 and 2014. In 2013 the club's second team won the junior A football title. The club won four under-21 A football titles between 2013 and 2018, including a three-in-a-row. In 2014 the club again reached the senior football final, but were defeated by the reigning champions Cratloe by 2-12 to 0-11.

In 2021 the club bridged a fifteen year gap when they won the Clare Senior Football Championship for the nineteenth time, defeating the reigning champions Kilmurry Ibrickane by 1–11 to 0–09 at Cusack Park in Ennis.

In 2022 having lost the senior hurling final to Ballyea by a point seven days earlier, the club defeated Ennistymon by 0-09 to 0-06 to successfully defend their crown and win their twentieth senior football title. It was the first back-to-back for the town since Ennis Faughs in 1947–1948.

In 2024 the club defeated Kilmurry Ibrickane by 1-10 to 0-06 to win their third senior football title in four years, and join Kilrush Shamrocks at the top of the Clare SFC roll of honour with twenty one titles each.

In 2025 the club won its fourth Cusack Cup and first since 2003, beating Doora-Barefield in the final. Later that year having first won the Clare Senior Hurling Championship against Clooney-Quin seven days earlier, the club won its twenty-second and new record Clare Senior Football Championship, again beating Doora-Barefield in the final by 1-16 to 2-06 and completing the "Double".

=== Hurling ===
In 1953 the club entered the Clare Senior Hurling Championship for the first time but were knocked-out by Clooney in the first round. In 1954 the club reached their first Clare Cup final losing out to Sixmilebridge. In 1955 the club reached the Clare Cup final once again, overcoming Feakle to win their first major honour. Later that year the club reached both the senior hurling and senior football finals. In the first senior hurling final appearance for an Ennis team since Ennis Dalcassians won in 1941, the club was defeated by Newmarket-on-Fergus. Ennis Faughs also reached the senior football final as reigning champions, but relinquished their title to Doonbeg.

In 1956 the club won its first Clare Senior Hurling Championship, defeating Clarecastle by 4–05 to 2-08. In 1957 the club won back-to-back senior hurling titles for the first time, defeating Whitegate by 5–09 to 2-03. In 1959 the club won its second Clare Cup. The club reached the senior hurling final again in 1959 and 1965, losing out to Ruan and Newmarket-on-Fergus respectively. In 1966 the club reached back-to-back senior hurling finals for the second time, overcoming Whitegate by 2–08 to 1–04 to win their third title and a twelfth overall for the town of Ennis.

In 1975 the club once again reached the senior hurling final only to be defeated by the East Clare amalgamation, Brian Boru's. Their next appearance in the senior hurling final came in 1980 where the club were victorious over Newmarket-on-Fergus. In 1982 the club returned to the senior hurling final, defeating Sixmilebridge by 3–08 to 2-09. In 1983 Sixmilebridge reversed the result after a replay. In 1985 the club were defeated by Kilmaley in the senior hurling final.

In 1990 the club's second-string team won the Clare Junior A Hurling Championship for the first time. The following week the club won their fifteenth overall senior hurling title, defeating O'Callaghan's Mills by 1–05 to 1-03. The club went on to defeat Roanmore of Waterford, and Na Piarsaigh of Cork, on its way to the Munster Senior Club Hurling Championship final for the first time, where they lost out to Patrickswell of Limerick. All three games took place at Cusack Park in Ennis. In 1992 the club reached the senior hurling final again only to go down to Sixmilebridge.

In 2000 the club reached both the senior hurling and senior football finals. While the club lost out to Sixmilebridge in the hurling, they defeated Doonbeg in the football. In 2002 the club's second-string team won its second junior A hurling title. In 2010 the club won their sixth under-21 A hurling title. In 2011 the majority of that team helped the club win the intermediate hurling title for the first time since Ennis Faughs in 1945.

In 2022 the club reached both the senior hurling and senior football finals. In a first hurling final appearance in twenty-two years, they came up just short to the reigning champions Ballyea, losing by a single point. Seven days later they defeated Ennistymon in the football final.

In 2025 the club again reached both the senior hurling and senior football finals. They first ended a thirty-five year famine to win the Clare Senior Hurling Championship for the sixteenth time, defeating Clooney-Quin by 0-17 to 0-12 at Cusack Park in Ennis. Seven days later they defeated Doora-Barefield in the football final to complete the "Double". The club went on to defeat Loughmore-Castleiney of Tipperary on its way to the Munster Senior Club Hurling Championship final for the second time, where they lost out to Ballygunner of Waterford at Semple Stadium in Thurles.

=== Camogie & Ladies Football ===
Éire Óg Camogie Club was established by Michael Brennan in 1967; his senior team enjoyed immediate success, dethroning 9 in a row champions, Killanena, in 1968. The team went from strength to strength, winning 8 senior titles in a row. There followed a two-year gap before Éire Óg captured four more senior titles in 1978, 1979, 1980 and 1981. In the more recent past, the club won the Féile na nGael Division 2 in 2010. Having competed for many years at Junior level, they finally made the breakthrough from junior to intermediate in 2012. Since 2012, the club has enjoyed much success at underage, but, the big prize of senior status continued to prove elusive until 2017, when they claimed the league championship double, defeating Broadford, Clarecastle/Ballyea, respectively. Minor B and Under-21B championships were also won in 2017.

Ladies Football arrived in 2002, with an Under-12 and Junior teams. Barry Donnelly was first chairman, succeeded by Alan Malone, who steered the club until 2014. Others involved were Sharon Malone and Claire Nihill. Shauna Keane and Orla McMahon have been playing members since the beginning, Shauna scoring the very first score for the new club in 2002.

== Major Honours ==
=== Gaelic Football ===
- Clare Senior Football Championship (23): 1890*, 1897*, 1899*, 1904*, 1907*, 1909*, 1910*, 1911*, 1913*, 1914*, 1929*, 1947**, 1948**, 1952**, 1954**, 1994**, 2000, 2006, 2021, 2022, 2024, 2025, 2026
- Clare Senior B Football Championship (1): 2019
- Clare Intermediate Football Championship (3): 1946**, 1985, 1995
- Munster Junior Club Football Championship Runners-Up: 2001
- Clare Junior A Football Championship (7): 1927*, 1943*, 1968**, 1975, 2001, 2013, 2018
- Clare Under-21 A Football Championship (5): 2000, 2013, 2014, 2015, 2018
- Clare Minor A Football Championship (8): 1979, 1992, 1993, 1994, 1998, 1999, 2012, 2017
- Cusack Cup (Clare Football League Div.1) (4): 1929*, 1932*, 2003, 2025
- Garry Cup (Clare Football League Div.2) (2): 2018, 2024
- Clare Football League Div.4 (1): 2018

* as Ennis Dalcassians
** as Ennis Faughs (with Doora-Barefield)

=== Hurling ===
- Munster Senior Club Hurling Championship Runners-Up: 1990, 2025
- Clare Senior Hurling Championship (16): 1890**, 1911*, 1914*, 1915*, 1924*, 1928* (with Clarecastle), 1929*, 1934*, 1941*, 1956, 1957, 1966, 1980, 1982, 1990, 2025
- Clare Senior B Hurling Championship (2): 2007, 2014
- Clare Intermediate Hurling Championship (4): 1927", 1945**, 1958"", 2011
- Clare Junior A Hurling Championship (4): 1927*, 1990, 2002, 2018
- Clare Under-21 A Hurling Championship (6): 1964, 1965, 1966, 1974, 1977, 2010
- Clare Minor A Hurling Championship (24): 1943*, 1944*, 1945*, 1946*, 1947*, 1949*, 1951*, 1955"", 1956"", 1957", 1961", 1962", 1963", 1965", 1966", 1967, 1969, 1971, 1972, 1974, 1978, 1989, 1991, 1993
- Clare Cup (Clare Hurling League Div.1) (2): 1955, 1959
- Clare Hurling League Div.2 (2): 2024, 2025
- Clare Hurling League Div.4 (5): 1989, 1990, 1995, 2002, 2008
- Christy Ring Trophy (All-Ireland U-14 Hurling Div.1) (1): 1999

* as Ennis Dalcassians
** as Ennis Faughs (with Doora-Barefield)
" as Ennis Rovers
"" as St. John's, Ennis

=== Camogie ===
- Munster Senior Club Camogie Championship Runners-Up: 1972, 1974, 1978, 1980
- Clare Senior Camogie Championship (12): 1968, 1969, 1970, 1971, 1972, 1973, 1974, 1975, 1978, 1979, 1980, 1981
- Clare Intermediate Camogie Championship (1): 2017
- Clare Junior A Camogie Championship (1): 2010
- Clare Under-21 B Camogie Championship (1): 2017
- Clare Minor B Camogie Championship (1): 2017
- Caithlín Ní Thoimín Shield (All-Ireland U-14 Camogie Div.2) (1): 2010
- All-Ireland U-14 Camogie Div.3 (1): 1986

=== Ladies Football ===
- Clare Intermediate Ladies Football Championship (2): 1996, 2024
- Clare Junior A Ladies Football Championship (2): 2014, 2015
- Clare Under-21 A Ladies Football Championship (1): 2017
- Clare Ladies Football League Div.3 (1): 2014

== County Players ==
This is a list of club players who have won major medals with Clare:

=== Gaelic Football ===
Player	Senior			
Player	Munster	All-Ireland B	League (Div.2)	League (Div.3)
James Hanrahan*	1992	1991	1992, 1995	
Stephen Hickey**		2004		
David Russell**		2004		
Sean O'Meara		2004		
Dean Ryan				2016

* Transferred from Doora-Barefield in 1996.
** Transferred from Clarecastle in 2004.

=== Hurling ===
Player	HOTY	All-Stars	Senior			Intermediate		Under-21		Minor	
Player	HOTY	All-Stars	All-Ireland	Munster	League	All-Ireland	Munster	All-Ireland	Munster	All-Ireland	Munster
Seamus Durack*		1977, 1978, 1981			1977, 1978						
Ger Cahill											1989
Francis Corey											1989
Stephen McNamara			1995, 1997	1995, 1997, 1998							
Colin Lynch**		1997	1997	1997, 1998							
Ronan Cooney										1997	
Kevin Moynihan						2011	2011	2009	2009		
Ronan Keane						2011	2011				
Davy O'Halloran			2013					2012, 2013	2012, 2013		2010, 2011
Shane O'Donnell	2024	2022, 2023, 2024	2013, 2024		2016, 2024			2013, 2014	2013, 2014		2011
David Reidy			2024		2016, 2024			2013, 2014	2013, 2014		
Liam Corry								2014	2014		
Danny Russell							2016				
Dara Walsh							2016				
Robert Loftus										2023	2023
Conor Perrill										2023	2023

* Transferred from Feakle in 1979.
** Transferred to Kilmaley in 1998.
