= Colin Lynch =

Irish hurler and Gaelic footballer

Personal information
- Native name: Cóilín Ó Loingsigh (Irish)
- Born: County Clare

Sport
- Hurling Position: Midfield
Clubs
- Years: Club
- Éire Óg, Ennis; Kilmaley; Lissycasey
Club titles
	Football	Hurling
Clare titles	1	1
Inter-county
Years	County	Apps (scores)
1997–2008	Clare	48 (1–43)
Inter-county titles
	Football	Hurling
Munster Titles	0	2
All-Ireland Titles	0	1
League titles	0	0
All-Stars	0	2

Colin Lynch (born 1973) is an Irish sportsperson. He plays hurling and Gaelic football with his local clubs Kilmaley and Lissycasey, and was a member of the Clare senior inter-county hurling team from 1997 until 2008.

== Playing career ==
=== Club ===
Colin played for Éire Óg ever before he played for Kilmaley. Lynch plays his club hurling with his local club Kilmaley and has enjoyed much success.

In 1998 Lynch lined out in his first county senior championship final. The famous St. Joseph's Doora-Barefield club provided the opposition, however, Kilmayley still came up short and Lynch ended up on the defeated side.

The following year Kilmaley were back in the junior hurling decider. Clonlara were the opponents on that occasion, however, for the second time Lynch's side faced defeat.

2004 saw Kilmaley finally break the barrier at senior level when they lined out against St. Joseph's in the senior championship decider. Lynch's side triumphed that day to collect their first senior county title since 1985.

Lynch also played Gaelic football with his local club Lissycasey and enjoyed much success. He won a county intermediate championship winners' medal in 1994, however, success at senior level was slow in coming. After defeat in senior county finals in 1998 and 2006, Lynch won a county senior championship winners' medal in 2007, following a five-point victory over Éire Óg.

=== Inter-county ===
Lynch first came to prominence on the inter-county scene as a member of the Clare senior team in 1994. He was included on the senior panel that year, however, it would be another few years before he secured a definite place on the starting fifteen.

Lynch made his debut in a Munster Championship quarter-final against Kerry in 1997. Clare had an easy win that day. A subsequent victory over Cork gave Lynch the chance to line out in his first Munster final. Tipperary were the opponents on that occasion and an exciting game was expected. Both sets of players did not disappoint. Clare led by five points at half-time, however, Tipp fought back in the second-half. In one of the best games of the decade Clare defeated Tipperary by 1–18 to 0–18. It was Lynch's first Munster winners' medal and Clare's first ever victory over Tipperary in the provincial decider. Clare were now hot favourites to reclaim the All-Ireland title. They showed their class against Kilkenny in the subsequent All-Ireland semi-final, thus booking their place in the All-Ireland final. The introduction of the so-called 'back-door system' saw Tipperary provide the opposition in that game. For the second time that year both sides served up a classic. Clare had the upper-hand for much of the game, however, Tipp remained close behind. Liam Cahill and Eugene O'Neill scored two goals for Tipp in the last ten minutes to set up an exciting finish. A draw looked likely, however, a classic late point from Jamesie O'Connor secured a narrow 0–20 to 2–13 victory for Clare. It was Lynch's first All-Ireland winners' medal. In winning the 1997 All-Ireland title Clare beat Cork, Kilkenny and Tipperary (twice) – the so-called big three of hurling. In doing so they became only the second team ever, along with Waterford in 1959, to achieve this.

In 1998 Clare were the hot favourites to retain their All-Ireland title. All was going to plan, however, Lynch's side drew with Waterford in the Munster final. The replay was one of the most controversial games of hurling ever played. Before the sliotar had even been thrown in, Lynch was pulling recklessly across Peter Queally and Tony Browne. A melee ensued two minutes into the game and Lynch punched Browne. Brian Lohan and Michael White were red-carded for also fighting, however, Lynch escaped being sent to the line. The rest of the game was played in an extremely bad spirit and Clare emerged the victors by 2–16 to 0–10. It was Lynch's second Munster winners' medal, however, the game was subject to much media discussion over the following week. The Munster Council later suspended Lynch for three months. He was a huge loss for the subsequent three-game All-Ireland semi-final saga with Offaly, a marathon run of games which Clare eventually lost, thus surrendering an All-Ireland title which they had been hot favourites to retain.

The following few seasons proved difficult for Lynch and for Clare. In spite of the team going into decline, Clare still qualified for the Munster final again in 1999. By now the 'hurling revolution' of the 1990s was drawing to a close as the 'old order' returned. Cork provided the opposition on that occasion, however, Clare were still the favourites going into the game. An exciting contest unfolded with Cork's Joe Deane scoring a key goal after an excellent pass from Seánie McGrath. A score line of 1–15 to 0–14 gave Cork the victory and saw Clare surrender their provincial title for the first time since 1996. Lynch's side, however, still had a chance to reclaim the All-Ireland title via the 'back-door'. A defeat of Galway in a replay set up an All-Ireland semi-final meeting with Kilkenny. Clare were now on a downward spiral as Kilkenny secured a 2–14 to 1–13 victory thanks to D.J. Carey.

The next few seasons saw Clare exit the provincial championship at an early stage, while manager Ger Loughnane also departed. In 2002 Clare exited the Munster race at the first hurdle, however, the newly expanded qualifiers system saw Lynch's side record subsequent victories over Dublin, Wexford, Galway and Waterford to reach the All-Ireland final. It was Lynch's second appearance in the championship decider. Kilkenny were the opposition and there was no doubt in the pundits' minds that there would be anything but a victory for 'the Cats'. Henry Shefflin and D.J. Carey combined to score 2–13, while Clare's forwards missed two easy goal chances. At the full-time whistle Kilkenny were the champions by 2–20 to 0–19.

Lynch's side faced early defeats in the provincial championships of 2003 and 2004. The team regrouped in the latter year and forced reigning champions Kilkenny to a draw in the All-Ireland quarter-final. 'The Cats' went on to win the replay with five points to spare.

Provincial defeat was Clare's lot again in 2005, however, Lynch's side reached the All-Ireland semi-final via the qualifiers. Cork were the opponents that day and found life difficult with a primed Clare team countering their every attack. 'The Rebels' fell behind by seven points at the start of the second-half. A huge performance by Cork turned this deficit around and Lynch's side eventually went on to lose the game by 0–16 to 0–15. Lynch had a chance to level the game with seconds left, however, his shot went wide.

Clare reached the All-Ireland semi-final again in 2006, this time with Kilkenny providing the opposition. After a reasonably good performance Clare fell short again as 'the Cats' went on to win the game and later take the All-Ireland title.

In 2008 Clare ended their first-round bogey in Munster and reached the final of the competition for the first time since 1999. A resurgent Tipperary provided the opposition on that occasion and an exciting game was expected, however, Tipperary were much too strong for 'the Banner' county. The game was far from a classic as Lynch's side eventually lost by 2–21 to 0–19. This defeat was not the end of the road, as Clare later lined out against Cork in the All-Ireland quarter-final. Clare were the favourites against a Cork side that was seen as past its prime. The team justified their favourites tag as Cork trailed by eight points at half-time. The second half was a different story as Cork took control. At the long whistle Lynch's side were defeated by 2–19 to 2–17. This defeat marked the end for Lynch as he announced his retirement from inter-county hurling just before the start of the 2009 championship.

== Championship Appearances ==
Scores and results list Clare's tally first.

#	Date	Venue	Opponent	Score	Result	Competition	Match report
1	18 May 1997	Cusack Park, Ennis	Kerry	?	3–24 : 1–6	Munster SHC quarter-final
2	8 June 1997	Gaelic Grounds, Limerick	Cork	?	1–19 : 0–18	Munster SHC semi-final
3	6 July 1997	Páirc Uí Chaoimh, Cork	Tipperary	?	1–18 : 0–18	Munster SHC final
4	10 August 1997	Croke Park, Dublin	Kilkenny	?	1–17 : 1–13	All-Ireland SHC semi-final
5	14 September 1997	Croke Park, Dublin	Tipperary	?	0–20 : 2–13	All-Ireland SHC final
6	21 June 1998	Semple Stadium, Thurles	Cork	0–0	0–21 : 0–13	Munster SHC semi-final	Irish Examiner
7	12 July 1998	Semple Stadium, Thurles	Waterford	0–0	1–16 : 3–10	Munster SHC final	Irish Examiner
8	19 July 1998	Semple Stadium, Thurles	Waterford	0–1	2–16 : 0–10	Munster SHC final replay	Irish Examiner
9	6 June 1999	Páirc Uí Chaoimh, Cork	Tipperary	0–1	2–12 : 0–18	Munster SHC semi-final	Irish Examiner
10	12 June 1999	Páirc Uí Chaoimh	Tipperary	0–1	1–21 : 1–11	Munster SHC semi-final replay	Irish Independent
11	4 July 1999	Semple Stadium, Thurles	Cork	0–1	0–14 : 1–15	Munster SHC final	Irish Examiner
12	25 July 1999	Croke Park, Dublin	Galway	0–0	3–15 : 2–18	All-Ireland SHC quarter-final	Irish Independent
13	1 August 1999	Croke Park, Dublin	Galway	0–2	3–18 : 2–14	All-Ireland SHC quarter-final replay	Irish Examiner
14	15 August 1999	Croke Park, Dublin	Kilkenny	0–0	1–13 : 2–14	All-Ireland SHC semi-final	Irish Examiner
15	11 June 2000	Páirc Uí Chaoimh, Cork	Tipperary	0–0	1–14 : 2–19	Munster SHC semi-final	Irish Independent
16	3 June 2001	Páirc Uí Chaoimh, Cork	Tipperary	0–0	0–14 : 0–15	Munster SHC semi-final	Irish Independent
17	19 May 2002	Páirc Uí Chaoimh, Cork	Tipperary	0–0	2–13 : 1–18	Munster SHC quarter-final	Irish Independent
18	15 June 2002	Parnell Park, Dublin	Dublin	0–2	3–22 : 1–8	All-Ireland SHC qualifier	Irish Independent
19	14 July 2002	O'Moore Park, Portlaoise	Wexford	0–3	3–15 : 3–7	All-Ireland SHC qualifier	Irish Independent
20	28 July 2002	Croke Park, Dublin	Galway	0–1	1–15 : 0–17	All-Ireland SHC quarter-final	Irish Examiner
21	11 August 2002	Croke Park, Dublin	Waterford	0–1	1–16 : 1–13	All-Ireland SHC semi-final	Irish Independent
22	8 September 2002	Croke Park, Dublin	Kilkenny	0–2	0–19 : 2–20	All-Ireland SHC final	Irish Examiner
23	18 May 2003	Páirc Uí Chaoimh, Cork	Tipperary	0–2	2–17 : 0–14	Munster SHC quarter-final	Irish Examiner
24	8 June 2003	Semple Stadium, Thurles	Cork	0–0	0–10 : 1–18	Munster SHC semi-final	Irish Examiner
25	16 May 2004	Semple Stadium, Thurles	Waterford	0–1	7–19 : 2–15	Munster SHC quarter-final	Hurling Stats
26	26 June 2004	Gaelic Grounds, Limerick	Laois	0–0	7–19 : 2–15	All-Ireland SHC qualifier	Hurling Stats
27	17 July 2004	Gaelic Grounds, Limerick	Offaly	0–1	3–16 : 2–10	All-Ireland SHC qualifier	Hurling Stats
28	25 July 2004	Croke Park, Dublin	Kilkenny	0–0	1–13 : 1–13	All-Ireland SHC quarter-final	Hurling Stats
29	31 July 2004	Semple Stadium, Thurles	Kilkenny	0–0	0–9 : 1–11	All-Ireland SHC quarter-final replay	Hurling Stats
30	5 June 2005	Gaelic Grounds, Limerick	Tipperary	0–0	0–14 2–14	Munster SHC semi-final	Hurling Stats
31	2 July 2005	O'Moore Park, Portlaoise	Offaly	0–1	1–12 1–11	All-Ireland SHC qualifier	Hurling Stats
32	10 July 2005	Cusack Park, Ennis	Waterford	0–0	4–14: 0–21	All-Ireland SHC qualifier	Hurling Stats
33	24 July 2005	Croke Park, Dublin	Wexford	0–1	1–20 : 0–12	All-Ireland SHC quarter-final	Hurling Stats
34	14 August 2005	Croke Park, Dublin	Cork	0–0	0–15 : 0–16	All-Ireland SHC semi-final	Hurling Stats
35	21 May 2006	Semple Stadium, Thurles	Cork	0–0	0–14 : 0–20	Munster SHC semi-final	Hurling Stats
36	18 June 2006	Cusack Park, Ennis	Limerick	0–0	2–21 : 0–10	All-Ireland SHC qualifier	Hurling Stats
37	1 July 2006	Parnell Park, Dublin	Dublin	0–1	4–21 : 1–16	All-Ireland SHC qualifier	Hurling Stats
38	8 July 2006	Cusack Park, Ennis	Offaly	0–1	2–15 : 1–9	All-Ireland SHC qualifier	Hurling Stats
39	23 July 2006	Croke Park, Dublin	Wexford	0–0	1–27 : 1–15	All-Ireland SHC quarter-final	Irish Examiner
40	13 August 2006	Croke Park, Dublin	Kilkenny	0–0	1–16 : 2–21	All-Ireland SHC semi-final	Irish Examiner
41	27 May 2007	Semple Stadium, Thurles	Cork	0–0	1–11 : 1–18	Munster SHC quarter-final	RTÉ Sport
42	7 July 2007	Cusack Park, Ennis	Galway	0–2	2–10 : 0–14	All-Ireland SHC qualifier	RTÉ Sport
43	14 July 2007	O'Moore Park, Portlaoise	Laois	1–0	2–14 : 1–11	All-Ireland SHC qualifier	RTÉ Sport
44	29 July 2007	Croke Park, Dublin	Limerick	0–2	1–16 : 1–23	All-Ireland SHC quarter-final	RTÉ Sport
45	1 June 2008	Gaelic Grounds, Limerick	Waterford	0–0	2–26 : 0–23	Munster SHC quarter-final	RTÉ Sport
46	22 June 2008	Semple Stadium, Thurles	Limerick	0–1	4–12 : 1–16	Munster SHC semi-final	RTÉ Sport
47	13 July 2008	Gaelic Grounds, Limerick	Tipperary	0–3	0–19 : 2–21	Munster SHC final	RTÉ Sport
48	27 July 2008	Semple Stadium, Thurles	Cork	0–0	2–17 : 2–19	All-Ireland SHC quarter-final	Irish Examiner

== Honours ==
=== Kilmaley ===
- Clare Senior Hurling Championship:
  - Winner (1): 2004
  - Runner-up (1): 1998
- Clare Junior Hurling Championship:
  - Winner (2): 2001, 2006
  - Runner-up (2): 1999, 1996

=== Lissycasey ===
- Clare Senior Football Championship:
  - Winner (1): 2007
  - Runner-up (2): 1998, 2006
- Clare Intermediate Football Championship:
  - Winner (1): 1994
- Clare Junior Football Championship:
  - Winner (1): 1992

=== Clare ===
- All-Ireland Senior Hurling Championship:
  - Winner (1): 1997
  - Runner-up (1): 2002
- Munster Senior Hurling Championship:
  - Winner (2): 1997, 1998
  - Runner-up (1): 1999, 2008
- All-Ireland Junior Hurling Championship:
  - Winner (1): 1993
- Munster Junior Hurling Championship:
  - Winner (1): 1993
- National Hurling League:
  - Winner (0):
  - Runner-up (2): 2001, 2005

=== Munster ===
- Railway Cup:
  - Winner (1): 1997
  - Runner-up (1): 2004
