= Clare Under-21 A Hurling Championship =

Sports competition in Ireland

Clare Under-21A Hurling Championship
- Irish: Craobh Fé-21A Iomána an Chláir
- Founded: 1964
- Title holders: Inagh Kilnamona (4th title)
- Most titles: Sixmilebridge (15 titles)
- Sponsors: Berwick Callinan Murphy Solicitors

The Clare Under-21A Hurling Championship (abbreviated to Clare 21AHC) is an annual GAA club competition organised by the Clare County Board between the top-ranking under-21 hurling clubs in County Clare, Ireland.

The current (2024) champions are the Inagh Kilnamona who defeated Eire Óg Inis by 0-18 to 0–17, to win their first title together since 2018, and fourth overall at this grade.

== Roll of honour ==
#	Club	Wins	Years won
1.	Sixmilebridge	15	1971, 1973, 1979, 1980, 1981, 1986, 1988, 1997, 1998, 2002, 2003, 2009, 2011, 2013, 2014
2.	Newmarket-on-Fergus	7	1967, 1968, 1970, 2001, 2004, 2005, 2006
3.	Éire Óg, Ennis	6	1964, 1965, 1966, 1974, 1977, 2010
	Feakle	6	1982, 1983, 1984, 1985, 2017 (with Killanena), 2023 (with Killanena)
5.	Clarecastle	4	1995, 1996, 1999, 2000
	Inagh-Kilnamona		2007, 2016, 2018, 2025
7.	Kilmaley	3	1975, 2015, 2019
	Wolfe Tones, Shannon	3	1989, 1990, 1991
	Ruan	3	1976, 1978, 2021 (with Corofin)
	Scariff	3	1987, 2022 (with Ogonelloe), 2024 (with Ogonelloe)
11.	St. Joseph's, Doora-Barefield	2	1993, 1994
	Ogonelloe	2	2022 (with Scariff), 2024 (with Scariff)
13.	Ballyea	1	2012
	Clonlara	1	2008
	Corofin	1	2021 (with Ruan)
	Cratloe	1	1992
	Crusheen	1	1969
	Killanena	1	2017 (with Feakle), 2023 (with Feakle)
	Whitegate	1	1972

== List of Clare 21AHC finals ==
Year	Winners	Score	Runners-up	Score
2025	Competition Ongoing			
2024	Scariff / Ogonelloe	3–10	Feakle / Killanena	0–11
2023	Feakle / Killanena	1–13	Inagh-Kilnamona	0–14
2022	Scariff / Ogonelloe	2–17	Corofin / Ruan	1–12
2021	Corofin / Ruan	1–18	Newmarket-on-Fergus	0–14
2020	No Competition			
2019	Kilmaley	3–17	Crusheen / Tubber	1-07
2018	Inagh-Kilnamona	1–18	Kilmaley	1–14
2017	Feakle / Killanena	0–16	Inagh-Kilnamona	1–10
2016	Inagh-Kilnamona	2–11	Feakle / Killanena	0–15
2015	Kilmaley	3–17	Éire Óg, Ennis	2-05
2014	Sixmilebridge	1–14	Ballyea	0–11
2013	Sixmilebridge	1–14	Clonlara	0–13
2012	Ballyea		Kilmaley	
2011	Sixmilebridge		Cratloe	
2010	Éire Óg, Ennis		Sixmilebridge	
2009	Sixmilebridge		Crusheen	
2008	Clonlara		Newmarket-on-Fergus	
2007	Inagh-Kilnamona		Newmarket-on-Fergus	
2006	Newmarket-on-Fergus		Clarecastle	
2005	Newmarket-on-Fergus		Scariff / Ogonelloe	
2004	Newmarket-on-Fergus		Cratloe	
2003	Sixmilebridge			
2002	Sixmilebridge		Cratloe	
2001	Newmarket-on-Fergus		Wolfe Tones, Shannon	
2000	Clarecastle		Newmarket-on-Fergus	
1999	Clarecastle		Newmarket-on-Fergus	
1998	Sixmilebridge		St. Joseph's, Doora-Barefield	
1997	Sixmilebridge		Clarecastle	
1996	Clarecastle		Scariff	
1995	Clarecastle		Wolfe Tones, Shannon	
1994	St. Joseph's, Doora-Barefield		Wolfe Tones, Shannon	
1993	St. Joseph's, Doora-Barefield		Éire Óg, Ennis	
1992	Cratloe		Éire Óg, Ennis	
1991	Wolfe Tones, Shannon		Clarecastle	
1990	Wolfe Tones, Shannon			
1989	Wolfe Tones, Shannon			
1988	Sixmilebridge			
1987	Scariff			
1986	Sixmilebridge		Feakle	
1985	Feakle		Sixmilebridge	
1984	Feakle		Sixmilebridge	
1983	Feakle		Sixmilebridge	
1982	Feakle		Éire Óg, Ennis	
1981	Sixmilebridge			
1980	Sixmilebridge			
1979 (R)	Sixmilebridge			
1978	Ruan			
1977	Éire Óg, Ennis			
1976	Ruan			
1975	Kilmaley			
1974 (R)	Éire Óg, Ennis			
1973	Sixmilebridge		Whitegate	
1972	Whitegate			
1971	Sixmilebridge			
1970	Newmarket-on-Fergus			
1969	Crusheen			
1968	Newmarket-on-Fergus			
1967	Newmarket-on-Fergus			
1966	Éire Óg, Ennis			
1965	Éire Óg, Ennis			
1964	Éire Óg, Ennis			

== See also ==
- Clare Senior Hurling Championship
- Clare Premier Intermediate Hurling Championship
- Clare Intermediate Hurling Championship
- Clare Junior A Hurling Championship
- Clare Premier Junior B Hurling Championship
- Clare Junior B Hurling Championship
- Clare Premier Junior C Hurling Championship
- Clare Junior C Hurling Championship
- Clare Minor A Hurling Championship
- Clare Cup (Clare Hurling League Div.1)
