= Clare Intermediate Hurling Championship =

Sports competition in Ireland

- Irish: Craobh Idirmhéanach Iomána an Chláir
- Founded: 1927
- Trophy: Pappy O'Callaghan Cup
- No. of teams: 10
- Title holders: The Banner, Ennis (1st title)
- Most titles: Smith O'Brien's, The Banner, Ennis (1 titles)
- Sponsors: TUS Midlands Midwest

The Clare Intermediate Hurling Championship (abbreviated to Clare IHC) is an annual GAA club competition organised by the Clare County Board for hurling clubs below premier intermediate and senior level. It is contested by intermediate hurling clubs in County Clare, Ireland. It is the third-tier adult competition of the Clare hurling pyramid.

The Clare IHC was introduced in 1927 as a county-wide competition for hurling clubs deemed not strong enough for senior level, and too strong for junior level. In later years the Clare IHC was opened to the second-, third-, and/or fourth-string teams from higher-ranked clubs.

In 2012 the Clare County Board decided that from 2014 onwards the Clare Senior Hurling Championship would become a sixteen-team competition. This meant that five clubs would lose their senior status and be relegated down to the second-tier intermediate level. However, due to the overwhelming success of both the Clare Senior and Under-21 inter-county hurling teams in 2013, this decision was postponed for twelve months. 2014 saw the relegation of Broadford, Doora-Barefield, Ruan, Scariff and Wolfe Tones down to intermediate for 2015.

In 2025 the Clare County Board introduced three new levels to the Clare hurling pyramid – Premier Intermediate, Premier Junior B and Premier Junior C. Every level below the sixteen-team senior level was now a new or updated ten-team level, with the respective champions promoted up one level, and the losers of a relegation play-off dropping down a level for the following year.

From 1927 to 2024 the Clare IHC was the second-tier of the Clare hurling pyramid. However, since the introduction of premier intermediate in 2025, it is effectively a new competition with a new trophy on offer for the winners. The Pappy O'Callaghan Cup was commissioned for the intermediate champions from 2025 onwards, and the previous intermediate trophy, the Paddy Browne Cup, is now awarded to the premier intermediate champions.

The winners of the Clare IHC are now presented with the Pappy O'Callaghan Cup as the original trophy is now presented to the premier intermediate champions, and are promoted to the Clare Premier Intermediate Hurling Championship.

The inaugural winners of the Pappy O'Callaghan Cup were Smith O'Brien's who defeated Inagh-Kilnamona by 2–18 to 1-20, to win their first title at this level in 2025.

Current champions are The Banner, Ennis after defeating Inagh-Kilnamona in the 2026 final.

== 2026 Intermediate clubs ==
The ten teams competing in the 2026 Clare Intermediate Hurling Championship are:

Club	Location	Colours	Titles	Last title
Broadford	Broadford	Green & Yellow	0	2019
Éire Óg, Ennis	Ennis	Red & White	0	2011
Inagh-Kilnamona	Inagh / Kilnamona	Yellow & Green	0	2005
Killanena	Killanena	Blue & Yellow	0	2010
Kilmaley	Kilmaley	Blue & White	0	2017
O'Callaghan's Mills	O'Callaghan's Mills	Green & Yellow	0	1977
Ogonnelloe	Ogonnelloe	Black & Amber	0	1995
Scariff	Scariff	Green & White	0	2020
St. Joseph's, Doora-Barefield	Doora / Barefield	Maroon & White	0	2022
The Banner, Ennis	Ennis	Saffron & Blue	0	–

Second-String Team Old Intermediate Title (1927–2024)

== Roll of honour ==
#	Club	Wins	Years won
1.	Smith O'Brien's, Killaloe	1	2025
1.	The Banner, Ennis	1	2026

== List of Clare IHC finals ==
Year	Winners	Score	Runners-up	Score
2026	The Banner, Ennis	1-29 (a.e.t)	Inagh-Kilnamona	1-17
2025	Smith O'Brien's, Killaloe	2–18	Inagh-Kilnamona	1-20

=== List of previous Clare IHC finals (1927–2024) ===
From 1927 to 2024, the Clare IHC was the second-tier of the Clare hurling pyramid until it was replaced by the Clare Premier Intermediate Hurling Championship. The below list of Clare IHC finals are now considered to be a part of the history of the Clare PIHC as its participants compete for the old Clare IHC trophy – Paddy Browne Cup. The 2024 intermediate champions, Wolfe Tones, Shannon, were the last winners of the Clare IHC to have their name engraved on the Paddy Browne Cup as intermediate champions in 2024. The Clare IHC began afresh from 2025 with the inaugural Pappy O'Callaghan Cup.

Old Intermediate Title (1927–2024)

Year	Winners	Runners-up
2024	Wolfe Tones, Shannon	Tubber
2023	Corofin	Sixmilebridge
2022	St. Joseph's, Doora-Barefield	Tulla
2021	Smith O'Brien's, Killaloe	St. Joseph's, Doora-Barefield
2020	Scariff	Tubber
2019	Broadford	St. Joseph's, Doora-Barefield
2018	Feakle	Tubber
2017	Kilmaley	Tubber
2016	St. Joseph's, Doora-Barefield	Broadford
2015	Wolfe Tones, Shannon	Broadford
2014	Feakle	Parteen
2013	Whitegate	Feakle
2012	Ruan	Crusheen
2011	Éire Óg, Ennis	Ruan
2010	Killanena	Ruan
2009	Whitegate	Feakle
2008	Broadford	Sixmilebridge
2007	Clonlara	Killanena
2006	Clooney-Quin	Killanena
2005	Inagh	Bodyke
2004	Smith O'Brien's, Killaloe	Clooney-Quin
2003	Broadford	Feakle
2002	Corofin	Clooney-Quin
2001	Ballyea	Sixmilebridge
2000	Crusheen	Clooney
1999	Clonlara	Crusheen
1998	Kilnamona	Inagh
1997	Broadford	Sixmilebridge
1996	Bodyke	Clonlara
1995	Ogonnelloe	Crusheen
1994	Cratloe	Ogonnelloe
1993	St. Joseph's, Doora-Barefield	Scariff
1992	Whitegate	Ogonnelloe
1991	Corofin	St. Joseph's, Doora-Barefield
1990	Sixmilebridge	Cratloe
1989	Clonlara	Bodyke
1988	Sixmilebridge	Corofin
1987	Crusheen	Clarecastle
1986	Clooney	Corofin
1985	St. Joseph's, Doora-Barefield	Clooney
1984	Whitegate	St. Joseph's, Doora-Barefield
1983	Wolfe Tones, Shannon	Killanena
1982	Scariff	Killanena
1981	Broadford	Scariff
1980	Kilmaley	Cratloe
1979	Tulla	Cratloe
1978	Ruan	Clonlara
1977	O'Callaghan's Mills	Kilmaley
1976	Tubber	Scariff
1975	Clonlara	Wolfe Tones, Shannon
1974	Broadford	O'Callaghan's Mills
1973	Feakle	Broadford
1972	Tubber	Feakle
1971	Sixmilebridge	Tubber
1970	Cratloe	Smith O'Brien's, Killaloe
1969	Bodyke	Smith O'Brien's, Killaloe
1968	O'Callaghan's Mills	Cratloe
1967	Newmarket-on-Fergus	Bodyke
1966	No Championship	
1965	No Championship	
1964	No Championship	
1963	No Championship	
1962	No Championship	
1961	No Championship	
1960	Crusheen	O'Callaghan's Mills
1959	Whitegate	Clooney
1958	St. John's, Ennis	Scariff
1957	Cappagh	Sixmilebridge
1956	Parteen	Turnpike, Ennis
1955	No Championship	
1954	No Championship	
1953	Competition Unfinished	
1952	Our Lady's Mental Hospital, Ennis	O'Callaghan's Mills
1951	Sixmilebridge	Turnpike, Ennis
1950	Dysart / Ruan	
1949	No Championship	
1948	Ruan	Whitegate
1947	Broadford	Ardnacrusha
1946	Bodyke	Ruan
1945	Ennis Faughs (Ennis Dals / Barefield)	Broadford
1944	Ballyea	Broadford
1943	Cratloe	Broadford
1942	Mountshannon	Sixmilebridge
1941	Broadford	Scariff
1940	Ruan	Sixmilebridge
1939	Mountshannon	Sixmilebridge
1938	Scariff	Ennis Rovers
1937	Cratloe	Scariff
1936	Bodyke	Ruan
1935	Kilkishen	Bodyke
1934	Clooney	Kilkishen
1933	O'Callaghan's Mills	Feakle
1932	Bodyke	O'Callaghan's Mills
1931	Clarecastle	O'Callaghan's Mills
1930	Feakle	Bodyke
1929	O'Callaghan's Mills	Kilbane / Ogonnelloe
1928	Clonlara	Ennis Dalcassians
1927	Ennis Rovers	Kilmore

- In late 1943, Ennis Dalcassians offered an opportunity to any players from their neighbours and fellow junior club, Doora-Barefield, to join with them and compete for titles at a higher level in both codes. Ennis Faughs won the 1945 intermediate hurling final against Broadford.
- In early 1974, Éire Óg took complete control over the organisation of gaelic games in Ennis when it merged with Ennis Rovers, St. John's and Turnpike to form one combined club for the town. Ennis Rovers won the 1927 intermediate hurling final against Kilmore, and lost the 1938 intermediate hurling final to Scariff. Turnpike lost the 1951 and 1956 intermediate hurling finals to Sixmilebridge and Parteen respectively. St. John's won the 1958 intermediate hurling final against Scariff.

== See also ==
- Clare Senior Hurling Championship
- Clare Premier Intermediate Hurling Championship
- Clare Junior A Hurling Championship
- Clare Premier Junior B Hurling Championship
- Clare Junior B Hurling Championship
- Clare Premier Junior C Hurling Championship
- Clare Junior C Hurling Championship
- Clare Under-21 A Hurling Championship
- Clare Minor A Hurling Championship
- Clare Cup (Clare Hurling League Div.1)
