= Michael Dwyers =

Michael Dwyers or Michael Dwyers GAA may refer to:

- Michael Dwyers GAA (Wicklow), a juvenile GAA club based in southwest County Wicklow
- Keady Michael Dwyer's GFC, a Gaelic football club in Keady, County Armagh, Northern Ireland
- Michael Dwyer (1772–1825), United Irishmen leader in the 1798 rebellion
