= Michael Dwyers GAA (Wicklow) =

Michael Dwyer Juvenile GAA Club is a juvenile GAA club based in southwest County Wicklow, named after the 1798 rebel Michael Dwyer who was active in the area. The club is an amalgamation of the adult clubs Kiltegan, Ballymanus, Stratford Grangecon GAA and Knockananna and competes in Wicklow GAA championships up to minor level.

Michael Dwyers have been successful both in Wicklow competitions and at national level, winning All-Ireland Féile na nGael hurling titles in 2001, 2016 and 2017.
