= David Forde (Clare hurler) =

Irish hurler

Personal information
- Born: 5 July 1976 (age 50) Ogonnelloe, County Clare
- Occupation: Teacher
- Height: 5 ft 8 in (173 cm)

Sport
- Sport: Hurling
- Position: Forward
Club
- Years: Club
- Ogonnelloe
Inter-county
- Years: County
- 1990s-2000s: Clare
Inter-county titles
- Munster titles: 2
- All-Irelands: 1

David Forde (born 5 July 1976 in Ogonnelloe, County Clare) is an Irish sportsperson. He plays hurling with his local club Ogonnelloe and was a member of the Clare senior inter-county team in the 1990s and 2000s. He played as a forward.
