= Killanena GAA =

Gaelic games club

- Cill An Aonaigh CLG
- Founded: 1888
- County: Clare
- Colours: Blue and Yellow
- Grounds: Killanena

Playing kits
Standard colours

Senior Club Championships
	All Ireland	Munster champions	Clare champions
Hurling:	-	-	1

Killanena GAA is a Gaelic Athletic Association club located in the village of Killanena, County Clare in Ireland. The club is exclusively concerned with the game of hurling.

In 2016, Killanena's Gerry O'Connor was named as the new joint manager of the Clare senior hurling team alongside Donal Moloney.

== Major honours ==
- Clare Senior Hurling Championship (1): 1975 (as Brian Boru's with Bodyke & Tulla)
- Clare Intermediate Hurling Championship (1): 2010
- Clare Junior A Hurling Championship (3): 1970, 1977, 1994
- Clare Under-21 A Hurling Championship (2): 2017 *’’’ Clare Under 21 A Hurling Championship: 2023(with Feakle)
