= Broadford GAA (Clare) =

GAA club in Clare

- Áth Leathan CLG
- County: Clare
- Colours: Green and Yellow
- Grounds: Broadford

Playing kits
Regular Kit

Broadford GAA is a Gaelic Athletic Association club located in the village of Broadford in East Clare, Ireland. The club fields teams exclusively in hurling competitions.

== Major Honours ==
- Clare Intermediate Hurling Championship (8): 1941, 1947, 1974, 1981, 1997, 2003, 2008, 2019
- Clare Junior A Hurling Championship (4): 1939, 1955, 1958 (as Kilbane) 2023
