= Tubber GAA =

Gaelic sports club, County Clare, Ireland

Tubber
- An Tobar
- Founded: 1885
- County: Clare
- Colours: Black and amber
- Grounds: Tubber

Playing kits
Standard colours

Senior Club Championships
	All Ireland	Munster champions	Clare champions
Hurling:	0	0	0

Tubber GAA is a Gaelic Athletic Association club located in Tubber, County Clare, Ireland. The club is primarily concerned with the game of hurling.

== History ==
Located near the village of Tubber, County Clare and overlooking the Burren, Tubber GAA Club affiliated to the Clare County Board in 1885. The club fielded teams in both hurling and Gaelic football in the early years, however, emigration and political tensions resulted in the Tubber club stagnating for almost 35 years. There was a revival in 1923, when Gaelic football was abandoned, and the club contested several Clare JHC finals without success.

Tubber regraded to the intermediate ranks in 1937 and claimed the Clare IHC on its first attempt. A period of decline once again followed in the late 1940s, before a revival in 1952. The Clare JHC title was won a decade later, before adding Clare IHC titles to the club's honours list in 1972 and 1976. Tubber spent nearly 40 years in the Clare SHC before relegation in 2015. During that time the club claimed three Clare SBHC titles.

== Honours ==
- Clare Senior B Hurling Championship (3): 1992, 2003, 2012
- Clare Intermediate Hurling Championship (3): 1937, 1972, 1976
- Clare Junior A Hurling Championship (1): 1962
- Clare Junior B Hurling Championship (2): 2012, 2017

== Notable players ==
- Patrick O'Connor: All-Ireland SHC-winner (2013)
- Donal O'Grady: Railway Cup-winner (1953, 1955)
