= Smith O'Brien's GAA =

Gaelic games club in County Clare, Ireland

Smith O'Brien's, Killaloe
- Mac Gabhann Uí Bhriain
- Founded: 1887
- County: Clare
- Nickname: Killaloe
- Colours: Scarlet and Amber
- Grounds: Killaloe

Playing kits
Regular Kit

Senior Club Championships
	All Ireland	Munster champions	Clare champions
Hurling:	-	-	1

Smith O'Brien's GAA is a Gaelic Athletic Association club located in the parish of Killaloe, County Clare in Ireland. The club field teams in hurling competitions. The club won the first ever Clare senior hurling championship in 1887, and the Clare intermediate hurling championshipin 2004 and 2021.

The club are named after William Smith O'Brien, an Irish Nationalist and Member of Parliament (MP) and leader of the Young Ireland movement who died in 1864.

== Major honours ==
- Clare Senior Hurling Championship (1): 1887
- Clare Premier Intermediate Hurling Championship (2): 2004, 2021
- Clare Intermediate Hurling Championship (1): 2025
- Clare Junior A Hurling Championship (3): 1967, 1978, 1997
- Clare Junior B Hurling Championship (2): 1967, 2025
