= Clare Junior A Hurling Championship =

Sports competition in Ireland

- Irish: Craobh Sóisear A Iomána an Chláir
- Founded: 1926
- Trophy: John Daly Cup
- No. of teams: 10
- Title holders: Newmarket-on-Fergus (6th title)
- Most titles: Inagh-Kilnamona (8 titles)
- Sponsors: Martin Murphy Building & Civil Contractors Ltd.

The Clare Junior A Hurling Championship (abbreviated to Clare JAHC) is an annual GAA club competition organised by the Clare County Board for hurling clubs below intermediate, premier intermediate and senior level. It is contested by the top-ranking junior hurling clubs in County Clare, Ireland. It is the fourth-tier adult competition of the Clare hurling pyramid.

The Clare JAHC was introduced in 1926 as a county-wide competition for hurling clubs deemed not strong enough for senior level. Intermediate level was introduced in 1927 for the same reason and placed above the Clare JAHC in the Clare hurling pyramid. In later years the Clare JAHC was opened to the second-, third-, and/or fourth-string teams from higher-ranked clubs.

In 2025 the Clare County Board introduced three new levels to the Clare hurling pyramid – Premier Intermediate, Premier Junior B and Premier Junior C. Every level below the sixteen-team senior level was now a new or updated ten-team level, with the respective champions promoted up one level, and the losers of a relegation play-off dropping down a level for the following year.

The winners of the Clare JAHC are presented with the John Daly Cup, and are promoted to the Clare Intermediate Hurling Championship.

The current (2026) champions are Newmarket-on-Fergus who defeated Ballyea by 2-15 to 2-14, to win their sixth title at this level.

== Munster club qualification ==
The winners of the Clare JAHC also qualify to represent Clare in the Munster Junior Club Hurling Championship. However, if a second-, third-, or fourth-string team wins the Clare JAHC, the highest finishing first-string team qualifies instead.

One Clare club has won the Munster Junior Club Hurling Championship:

- Newmarket-on-Fergus won the 2003 Munster junior club title, beating Dromina (Cork) in the final.

No Clare club has progressed to the All-Ireland Junior Club Hurling Championship.

== 2026 Junior A clubs ==
The ten teams competing in the 2026 Clare Junior A Hurling Championship are:

Club	Location	Colours	Titles	Last title
Ballyea	Ballyea	Black & Amber	3	1991
Clarecastle	Clarecastle	Black & White	2	2012
Clonlara	Clonlara	Amber & Black	4	2019
Clooney-Quin	Clooney / Quin	Green & Red	2	1966
Cratloe	Cratloe	Blue & White	4	2013
Crusheen	Crusheen	Red & White	5	2010
Ennistymon	Ennistymon	Green & Yellow	1	2004
Inagh-Kilnamona	Inagh / Kilnamona	Yellow & Green	8	2014
Newmarket-on-Fergus	Newmarket-on-Fergus	Blue & Gold	5	2011
Wolfe Tones Na Sionna	Shannon	Green & White	6	2008

Second-String Team Third-String Team

== Roll of honour ==
#	Club	Wins	Years won
1.	Inagh-Kilnamona	8	1965 (as Kilnamona), 1971 (as Kilnamona), 1975 (as Kilnamona), 1984 (as Inagh), 1989 (as Kilnamona), 1993 (as Inagh), 1996 (as Kilnamona), 2014
2.	Bodyke	7	1929, 1942 (as Tuamgraney), 1946, 1957 (as Tuamgraney), 1961, 1986, 2017
2.	Parteen-Meelick	7	1930 (as Meelick), 1945 (as Ardnacrusha), 1954 (as Parteen), 1968 (as Parteen), 1987 (as Meelick), 2005 (as Parteen), 2007 (as Meelick)
4.	Sixmilebridge	6	1947 (as Cappagh), 1949 (as Cappagh), 1950, 1956 (as Cappagh), 1981, 2016
4.	Wolfe Tones, Shannon	6	1931 (as Tradaree), 1943 (as Tradaree), 1974, 1979, 1995, 2008
4.	Newmarket-on-Fergus	6	1926, 1972, 1998, 2003, 2011, 2026
7.	Crusheen	5	1934, 1941, 1944, 1959, 2010
7.	St. Joseph's, Doora-Barefield	5	1952, 1960, 1983, 2000, 2022
9.	Clonlara	4	1973, 1999, 2015, 2019
9.	Cratloe	4	1935, 1964, 1976, 2013
9.	Éire Óg, Ennis	4	1927 (as Ennis Dals), 1990, 2002, 2018
12.	Broadford	3	1939, 1955, 1958, 2023 (as Kilbane)
12.	Ballyea	3	1940, 1982, 1991
12.	Corofin	3	1969, 1980, 2009
12.	Killanena	3	1970, 1977, 1994
12.	Kilmaley	3	1963, 2001, 2006, 2024
12.	Ogonnelloe	3	1937, 1988, 2021
12.	Smith O'Brien's, Killaloe	3	1967, 1978, 1997
19.	Clarecastle	2	1985, 2012
19.	Clooney-Quin	2	1933 (as Clooney), 1966 (as Clooney)
19.	Feakle	2	1928, 1953 (as Bauroe)
19.	Ruan	2	1932, 1948
19.	Scariff	2	1936, 1992
24.	Ennistymon	1	2004
24.	Our Lady's Mental Hospital, Ennis	1	1951
24.	O'Callaghan's Mills	1	2020
24.	The Banner, Ennis	1	2025
24.	Tubber	1	1962
24.	Whitegate	1	1938 (as Mountshannon)

== See also ==
- All-Ireland Junior Club Hurling Championship
- Munster Junior Club Hurling Championship
- Clare Senior Hurling Championship
- Clare Premier Intermediate Hurling Championship
- Clare Intermediate Hurling Championship
- Clare Premier Junior B Hurling Championship
- Clare Junior B Hurling Championship
- Clare Premier Junior C Hurling Championship
- Clare Junior C Hurling Championship
- Clare Under-21 A Hurling Championship
- Clare Minor A Hurling Championship
- Clare Cup (Clare Hurling League Div.1)
