= Ogonnelloe GAA =

Gaelic games club in County Clare, Ireland

Ogonnelloe
- Tuath O'gConaile
- Founded: 1884
- County: Clare
- Colours: Black and Yellow
- Grounds: Dr Stuart Park, Ogonnelloe

Playing kits
Regular Kit

Senior Club Championships
	All Ireland	Munster champions	Clare champions
Hurling:	-	-	1

Ogonnelloe GAA is a Gaelic Athletic Association club located in the parish of Ogonnelloe, County Clare in Ireland. The club field teams in hurling competitions.

Ogonnelloe enjoyed their most successful times over a 20 year duration when they climbed from Junior in 1988 through Intermediate which they won in 1995, into senior where they remained until 2009. During this time they collected a Junior 'A' and Intermediate championship, as well as a Clare Cup and two Senior 'B' championships. Ogonnelloe currently compete at Intermediate level.

Since 2005, Ogonnelloe have been amalgamated with Scariff GAA at underage level up to U-21. In the second year of the amalgamation they enjoyed a great run in the U-21 'A' Championship, concluding in a narrow loss to Newmarket-on-Fergus in the final replay. In the years since then, they have tasted success at U-14, U-15, U-16 and Minor 'B' and 'C' level. Scariff/Ogonnelloe won the U-21 'A' Championship in 2022, the first championship win at 'A' grade for the amalgamation.

In January 2020, Ogonnelloe announced the development of an indoor astro pitch in Dr. Stuart Park.

== Major honours ==
- Clare Senior Hurling Championship (1): 1888
- Clare Senior B Hurling Championship (2): 1999, 2005
- Clare Premier Intermediate Hurling Championship (1): 1995
- Clare Junior A Hurling Championship (3): 1937, 1988, 2021
- Clare Hurling League Div. 1 (Clare Cup) (1): 1999
- Clare Under-21 A Hurling Championship (2): 2022, 2024 (with Scariff)

== Notable players and club members ==
- Joseph Stuart: 19th President of the GAA
- David Forde (Clare hurler): All-Ireland Senior Hurling Winner 1997
- Patrick McMillan 2018 Winter Olympics' Skier
- Damien Varley Former Munster and Ireland rugby player
- Gearoid Sheedy All-Ireland Senior Hurling Winner 2024
