= Wolfe Tones GAA (Clare) =

Gaelic games club in County Clare, Ireland

Wolfe Tones, Shannon
- Wolfe Tones Na Sionna
- Founded: 1967
- County: Clare
- Colours: White and Green
- Grounds: Shannon
- Coordinates: 52°42′13.45″N 8°52′05.29″W

Playing kits
Standard colours

Senior Club Championships
	All Ireland	Munster champions	Clare champions
Hurling:	0	1	2

Wolfe Tones is a Gaelic Athletic Association club in Shannon in County Clare, Ireland. The Wolfe Tones na Sionna club was founded in 1967.

== 2020s ==
- Clare Intermediate Hurling Championship (1): 2024
- Clare Intermediate Football Championship (1): 2024

== 2010s ==
- Clare Senior B Football Championship (2): 2010, 2012
- Munster Intermediate Club Hurling Championship (1): 2015
- Clare Intermediate Hurling Championship (2): 2015, 2024
- Clare Intermediate Football Championship (1): 2014
- Clare Junior A Ladies Football Championship (1): 2010
- Clare Junior B Football Championship (1): 2016
- Clare Junior B Hurling Championship (2): 2016, 2023
- Clare Junior C Hurling Championship (1): 2015
- Clare Under-21 B Hurling Championship (1): 2010
- Clare Minor C Hurling Championship (2): 2012, 2013

=== 2000s ===
- Clare Senior Hurling Championship (1): 2006
- Clare Senior B Hurling Championship (1): 2008
- Clare Junior A Hurling Championship (1): 2008
- Clare Junior A Ladies Football Championship (3): 2003, 2004, 2009
- Clare Junior B Football Championship (1): 2000
- Clare Junior C Hurling Championship (1): 2008
- Clare Hurling League Div.1 (Clare Cup) (1): 2006
- Clare Hurling League Div.3 (1): 2003
- Clare Football League Div.3 (1): 2005
- Clare Football League Div.4 (1): 2000
- Clare Ladies Football League Div.3 (1): 2003
- Dunworth's Perpetual Cup (): 2008
- Clare Minor A Football Championship (2): 2005, 2006
- Clare Minor A Ladies Football Championship (2): 2003, 2004
- Clare Minor B Hurling Championship (1): 2004

=== 1990s ===
- All-Ireland Senior Club Hurling Championship Runners-Up: 1997
- Munster Senior Club Hurling Championship (1): 1996
- Clare Senior Hurling Championship (1): 1996
- Clare Intermediate Football Championship (2): 1990, 1996
- Mid-South Clare Intermediate Hurling Championship (1): 1996
- Clare Junior A Hurling Championship (1): 1995
- Clare Under-21 A Hurling Championship (2): 1990, 1991
- Clare Under-21 A Football Championship (1): 1990
- Clare Minor A Hurling Championship (1): 1992

=== 1980s ===
- Clare Intermediate Hurling Championship (1): 1983
- Clare Junior B Hurling Championship (1): 1987
- Clare Hurling League Div.4 (1): 1987
- Clare Under-21 A Hurling Championship (1): 1989
- Clare Minor A Football Championship (2): 1985, 1988
- Clare Minor A Hurling Championship (1): 1988
- Clare Minor C Hurling Championship (1): 1984
- Clare Minor Hurling League (1): 1988
- Féile na nGael All-Ireland Championship (Christy Ring Trophy) (3): 1986, 1987, 1988

=== 1970s ===
- Clare Intermediate Football Championship (2): 1973, 1975
- Clare Junior A Hurling Championship (2): 1974, 1979
- Clare Junior A Football Championship (1): 1972
- Clare Hurling League Div.3 (1): 1973

=== 1960s ===
- Clare Junior A Football Championship (1): 1967

=== Before Wolfe Tones ===
- Clare Junior A Hurling Championship (2): 1931 (as Tradaree), 1943 (as Tradaree)

== Notable players ==
Three Clare senior hurling team captains have been from the club; Brian Lohan, Frank Lohan and 2008 captain Brian O'Connell. Rory Hayes, Aron Shanagher, Darragh Lohan and Daithi Lohan are the club's current representatives on the Clare senior hurling team. Eoin Casey and Dean Devanney are on the Clare senior football team.

Notable players include:

- Aaron Cunningham
- Brian Lohan
- Frank Lohan
- Brian O'Connell
- Rory Hayes
- Daithi O'Connell
