= Feakle GAA =

Gaelic games club in County Clare, Ireland

Feakle
- Fiachoill
- Founded: 1884
- County: Clare
- Colours: Green and yellow
- Grounds: Feakle Hurling Field
- Coordinates: 52°55′25″N 8°39′01″W

Playing kits
Standard colours

Senior Club Championships
	All Ireland	Munster champions	Clare champions
Hurling:	0	0	7

Feakle GAA is a Gaelic Athletic Association club based in Feakle, County Clare, Ireland. The club is primarily concerned with the game of hurling.

In October 2024, Feakle won a first Clare SHC title since 1988, defeating Sixmilebridge by 1–17 to 0–13 in the final.

== Major honours ==
- Clare Senior Hurling Championship (7): 1935, 1938, 1939, 1940, 1944, 1988, 2024
- Munster Intermediate Club Hurling Championship Runners-Up: 2018
- Clare Intermediate Hurling Championship (4): 1930, 1973, 2014, 2018
- Clare Junior A Hurling Championship (2): 1928, 1953 (as Bauroe)
- Clare Hurling League Div.1 (Clare Cup) (?): 1988, 2021
- Clare Under-21 A Hurling Championship (5): 1982, 1983, 1984, 1985, 2017, 2023 (with Killanena)

== Notable players ==
- Séamus Durack
- Ger Loughnane
- Adam Hogan
- Eibhear Quilligan
