= Bodyke GAA =

- Lúbán Díge CLG
- County: Clare
- Colours: Black and amber
- Grounds: Páirc na Dishealbhaithe (field of the evicted)

Playing kits
Regular Kit

Senior Club Championships
	All Ireland	Munster champions	Clare champions
Hurling:	-	-	2

Bodyke GAA is a Gaelic Athletic Association club located in the village of Bodyke in east County Clare, Ireland. The club fields teams exclusively in hurling competitions.

The club's grounds, "Páirc na Dishealbhaithe", were officially opened on 20 May 2000.

== Honours ==
- Clare Senior Hurling Championship (2): 1947, 1975 (as Brian Boru's with Killanena & Tulla)
- Clare Intermediate Hurling Championship (5): 1932, 1936, 1946, 1969, 1996
- Clare Junior A Hurling Championship (7): 1929, 1942 (as Tuamgraney), 1946, 1957 (as Tuamgraney), 1961, 1986, 2017
