= St Joseph's, Doora-Barefield GAA =

Gaelic games club in County Clare, Ireland

St Joseph's, Doora-Barefield
- Naomh Sheosamh, Dúbraith-Gort Lomán
- Founded: 1887
- County: Clare
- Nickname: The Parish
- Colours: Maroon and White
- Grounds: Gurteen (formerly Roslevan)
- Coordinates: 52°50′34″N 8°54′21″W

Playing kits
Regular Kit	Change Kit

Senior Club Championships
	All Ireland	Munster champions	Clare champions
Football:	-	-	1
Hurling:	1	2	5

St Joseph's, Doora-Barefield is a Gaelic Athletic Association club in the parish of Doora-Barefield outside Ennis, County Clare, Ireland. While hurling was previously the more popular sport in Doora-Barefield, the club fields teams in both hurling and Gaelic football. Their main playing fields, located in Gurteen, include three full-size pitches as well as changing and showering facilities.

== History ==
St Joseph's Doora Barefield GAA club was established in 1887. The club won its first senior county title, as "Doora", in the 1898 Clare Senior Football Championship.

During the 20th century, players from the club joined up with neighbours and local rivals Éire Óg to form the "Ennis Faughs". Both clubs were competing at lower levels at the time so it was seen as an opportunity for the players to compete for senior hurling and football titles. Between 1944–1955 and 1993–1995, the Ennis Faughs competed in eight county football finals, winning five senior county football titles in 1947, 1948, 1952, 1954 and 1994. The Ennis Faughs also won a senior county hurling title in 1890, an intermediate hurling title in 1945, an intermediate football title in 1946, and a junior football title in 1968.

In 1998, St Joseph's Doora Barefield won the Clare Senior Hurling Championship and Munster Senior Club Hurling Championship, and went on to win the All-Ireland Senior Club Hurling Championship.

In 2022, the club won the Clare Intermediate Hurling Championship, and their second team won the Clare Junior A Hurling Championship.

== Honours ==
=== Hurling ===
- All-Ireland Senior Club Hurling Championship (1): 1999
- Munster Senior Club Hurling Championship (2): 1998, 1999
- Clare Senior Hurling Championship (5): 1954, 1958, 1998, 1999, 2001
- Clare Intermediate Hurling Championship (4): 1985, 1993, 2016, 2022
- Clare Junior A Hurling Championship (4): 1952, 1960, 1983, 2000, 2022
- Clare Under-21 A Hurling Championship (2): 1993, 1994

=== Gaelic Football ===
- Clare Senior Football Championship (1): 1898 (as Doora)
- Clare Football League Div. 1 (Cusack Cup) (0): (runners-up in 2012, 2025)
- Clare Intermediate Football Championship (2): 1997, 2020
- Clare Junior A Football Championship (2): 1989, 1993
- Clare Under-21 A Football Championship (1): 2008, 2024

== Notable players ==
A number of Clare inter-county players have played for St Joseph's, including several who played with the 1995 All Ireland winning team. These include Jamesie O'Connor, Seánie McMahon and Ollie Baker. All have won two All-Ireland Senior Championship medals, Seánie McMahon and Jamesie O'Connor won the GAA All Star Player of the Year Award for 1995 and 1997 respectively.
