= Kilmaley GAA =

Gaelic games club in County Clare, Ireland

Kilmaley
- Cill Mháille
- County: Clare
- Colours: Blue and white
- Grounds: Kilmaley
- Coordinates: 52°48′50.67″N 9°05′44.66″W

Playing kits
Standard colours

Kilmaley is a GAA club in County Clare, Ireland.

The club has won two Clare Senior Hurling Championship's and in 2026 reached its first final in 22 years after defeating Scariff in the semi-finals on 26 September 2026.

== Major honours ==
- Clare Senior Hurling Championship (2): 1985,2004
- Munster Intermediate Club Hurling Championship Runners-Up: 2017
- Clare Intermediate Hurling Championship (2): 1980, 2017
- Clare Junior A Hurling Championship (4): 1963, 2001, 2006, 2024
- Clare Club Hurling League Division 1 (Clare Cup)|Clare Hurling League Div. 1 (Clare Cup) (3): 2001, 2019, 2022
- Clare Under-21 A Hurling Championship (3): 1975, 2015, 2019

== Notable players ==
- Conor Clancy
- Colin Lynch
- Alan Markham
- Diarmuid McMahon
- Conor Cleary
