= Killone =

Civil parish in County Clare, Ireland

Killone Cill Eoin
- Civil parish
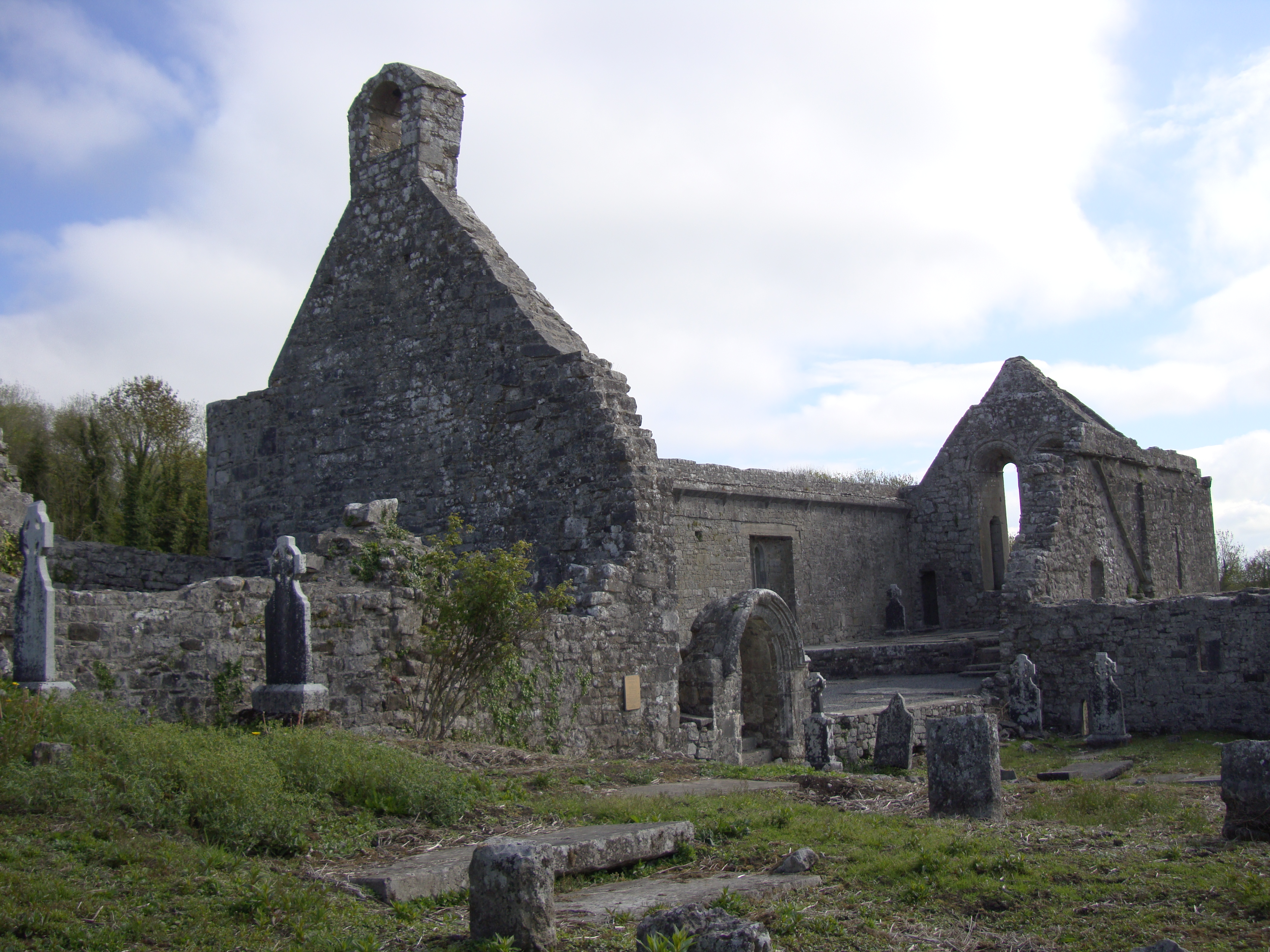
- Killone Abbey

- Location in Ireland
- Coordinates: 52°47′57″N 8°59′54″W
- Country: Ireland
- Province: Munster
- County: County Clare
- Time zone: UTC+0 (WET)
  - Summer (DST): UTC-1 (IST (WEST))

Killone (Irish: Cill Eoin) is a civil parish of County Clare, Ireland, to the southwest of Ennis. It is known for the ruins of Killone Abbey on the grounds of Newhall House and Estate.

== Location ==
Killone is in the Barony of Islands, 4 kilometres (2.5 mi) southwest of Ennis on the road to Kildysart. It is 1.6 kilometres (0.99 mi) southwest of Clareabbey. The parish is 6.04 by 5.23 kilometres (3.75 by 3.25 mi) and covers 2,314 hectares (5,720 acres). The parish covers most of the western screen of the head of the River Fergus estuary, and combines fertile low ground with rocky hillocks, hills, and ridges. The parish holds Killone Lough.

== Antiquities ==
Domnall Mór Ua Briain, styled King of Limerick, founded Killone Abbey around 1190 for Augustinian nuns, dedicated to Saint John the Baptist. Slaney, daughter of King Donogh Carbreach of Thomond, was abbess of this nunnery. She died in 1260.

The ruins are near the northeast of Lake Killone. The graveyard and abbey are privately owned, part of Newhall Estate, and as protected sites under national monument legislation, guardianship is vested in the Office of Public Works. As it is private land, access is available with the owner's permission. Killone Abbey is linked to Clare Abbey by the Pilgrim's Road, a footpath. There is a holy well dedicated to Saint John near the abbey.

In 1544 King Henry VIII of England granted the abbey, three townlands, all the tithes of the parish of Killone and much other property in Clare to Murrough O'Brien, 1st Earl of Thomond. In 1580 Killone Castle was the property of the Baron of Inchiquin. There is now no trace of the castle except for Newhall House.

As of 1837 the parish was united with the Clareabbey parish in the Catholic church. There was a chapel at Ballyea. The population in 1841 was 2,777 in 429 houses. The civil parish is now part of the Ballyea/Clarecastle Catholic parish. Mass is still held at Saint John's Well.

== Townlands ==
Townlands are Ballyea, Ballyvullagan, Bansha, Barloughra, Barnanageeha, Cappagarraun, Darragh North, Darragh South, Drumadrehid, Drummeen East, Drummeen West, Edenvale, Kilglassy, Killerk East, Killerk West, Kilmoraun, Kilmore, Knockanira, Lackennaskagh, Lismulbreeda, Newhall, Rathmeehan, Reaghfa, Shannacool and Teermaclane.
