= Cian Broderick =

Irish hurler

Personal information
- Native name: Cian Ó Brudair (Irish)
- Born: 2002 (age 23–24) Clarecastle, County Clare, Ireland
- Occupation: Student

Sport
- Sport: Hurling
- Position: Goalkeeper
Club
- Years: Club
- 2020-present: Clarecastle
Club titles
- Clare titles: 0
College
- Years: College
- 2020-2024: TUS Midwest
College titles
- Fitzgibbon titles: 0
Inter-county*
Years	County	Apps (scores)
2022-present	Clare	0 (0-00)
Inter-county titles
- Munster titles: 0
- All-Irelands: 1
- NHL: 1
- All Stars: 0
- *Inter County team apps and scores correct as of 21:33, 6 July 2024.

Cian Broderick (born 2002) is an Irish hurler. At club level he plays with Clarecastle and at inter-county level with the Clare senior hurling team. He usually lines out as a goalkeeper.

== Career ==
Broderick first played hurling to a high standard as a student at St Flannan's College in Ennis. He lined out in goal when St Flannan's beat Christian Brothers College, Cork by 1–15 to 1–12 to win the Dr Harty Cup title in 2020. Broderick began his club career in the juvenile and underage grades with Clarecastle, before eventually progressing to adult level. He has also lined out for TUS Midwest in the third level Fitzgibbon Cup competition.

Broderick first appeared on the inter-county scene with Clare as a member of the minor team beaten by Limerick in the 2019 Munster MHC final. He later spent three consecutive seasons as goalkeeper with the under-20 team. Broderick joined the senior team in his final year with the under-20s in 2022. He made his debut during Clare's National Hurling League-winning campaign in 2024.

== Honours ==
St Flannan's College

- Dr Harty Cup: 2020

Clare

- National Hurling League: 2024
- All-Ireland Senior Hurling Championship: 2024
