= Fergus Tuohy =

Irish hurler

Personal information
- Nickname: Tuts
- Born: 1969 (age 56–57) Clarecastle, County Clare, Ireland

Sport
- Sport: Hurling
- Position: Forward
Club
- Years: Club
- 1987-2000: Clarecastle
Club titles
- Clare titles: 4
- Munster titles: 1
Inter-county
- Years: County
- 1990-2000: Clare
Inter-county titles
- Munster titles: 3
- All-Irelands: 2
- NHL: 0
- All Stars: 0

Fergus Tuohy (born 1969) is an Irish hurling manager and former player. At club level he played with Clarecastle and at inter-county level with the Clare senior hurling team. Tuohy later served as a manager and selector.

== Playing career ==
Tuohy played hurling at all levels during his schooldays at St Flannan's College in Ennis. He progressed to the college's senior team and won a Dr Harty Cup medal in 1987 after a 3-12 to 2-06 defeat of Midleton CBS in the final. Tuohy later added a Dr Croke Cup medal to his collection, following a 13-point win over St Kieran's College in the 1987 All-Ireland colleges final.

At club level, Tuohy first played for Clarecastle at juvenile and underage levels. He won consecutive Clare MAHC titles and a Clare U21AHC medal before progressing to adult level. Tuohy was in his final year of the minor grade when he won the first of four Clare SHC medals. He ended his club career by winning a Munster Club SHC medal after a 2-11 to 0-15 defeat of Patrickswell.

Tuohy first played for Clare at inter-county level as a member of the under-21 team. He progressed to the senior team and made his debut against Tipperary in the 1990-91 National League. Tuohy was part of the Clare team that bridged a 63-year gap to win the Munster SHC title in 1995. He later claimed an All-Ireland SHC medal after Clare beat Offaly to claim the title for the first time in 81 years.

Tuohy won a second Munster SHC title in 1997, before claiming a second All-Ireland SHC winners' medal after a defeat of Tipperary in the 1997 All-Ireland final. He won a third Munster SHC medal in four seasons in 1998.

== Management career ==
Tuohy had just brought his playing career to an end when he immediately became involved in management. He was a selector with the Clare minor team for a period. Tuohy later became a Gaelic football manager when he took charge of Shannon Gaels, helping the team to the Clare SBFC title in 2005. He later managed the Clarecastle senior hurling team before becoming involved as a selector with the Clare senior team in 2008. Tuohy also trained the Lixnaw hurling team.

== Honours ==
St Flannan's College

- Dr Croke Cup: 1987
- Dr Harty Cup: 1987

Clarecastle

- Munster Senior Club Hurling Championship: 1997
- Clare Senior Hurling Championship: 1987, 1991, 1994, 1997
- Clare Under-21 A Hurling Championship: 1989
- Clare Minor A Hurling Championship: 1986, 1987

Clare

- All-Ireland Senior Hurling Championship: 1995, 1997
- Munster Senior Hurling Championship: 1995, 1997, 1998
