= Francis Bindon =

18th-century Irish architect and painter

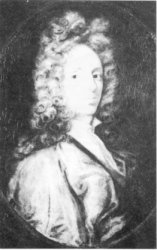
- Born: c. 1690; Ireland
- Died: 1765 (aged c. 75)
- Occupation: Architect
- Relatives: Samuel Bindon (brother)
- Buildings: Newhall House and Estate; Woodstock Estate; Russborough House; Bessborough House

Francis Bindon (c. 1690 – 1765) was a popular architect and painter in 18th century Ireland. Bindon was highly regarded by his contemporaries and was commissioned to design buildings and paint portraits for some of Ireland's most prominent figures. Today, relatively little is known about the man, despite the number of paintings and buildings he has left as his legacy.

== Notable works ==
Bindon spent much of his life in Dublin where he established himself as a popular portrait painter. Perhaps his most famous portrait is that of Turlough Carolan, the blind harpist. The painting, only recently attributed to Bindon, hangs in the National Gallery of Ireland and is the only known portrait of Carolan to have survived. Other portraits include those of Archbishop Hugh Boulter, Thomas Sheridan, Archbishop Charles Cobbe, Dean Patrick Delaney, and several of Jonathan Swift.

Bindon went on to design mostly classically derived country houses such as Woodstock, County Kilkenny, Drewstown, County Meath and Newhall, County Clare. He also designed Johns Square in Limerick, the Market House, Mountrath and worked in collaboration with Richard Cassels on the design of Russborough House, County Wicklow (completing it after Cassels died in 1751). Russborough is arguably the most beautiful house in Ireland.

Deane Swift, cousin of Jonathan Swift, described him as "the greatest painter and architect of his time in these kingdoms", a territory which would have included Ireland, England, Scotland and Wales. Admittedly, Swift was a close friend of Bindon's and may have been guilty of "amiable overstatement". Be that as it may, the simple elegance of Bindon's art and architecture speaks eloquently enough for itself. Several of his portraits of leading members of 18th century society hang in the National Gallery, while a number of his elegant Palladian mansions are dotted throughout the Irish countryside.

== Life ==
The most thorough piece of research on Bindon to date was written by the Knight of Glin in 1967. However, this is more of a succinct artistic critique than a biography and contains tantalisingly few details of his private life. What we do know is that Bindon was born in Clooney, County Clare c. 1690 and died unmarried in 1765. Like many of his contemporaries, Bindon was a 'gentleman amateur' whose privileged background allowed him to pursue a wide variety of interests.

Born in Clooney House to a wealthy land-owning family, Bindon was well positioned to establish contacts that would ultimately benefit his career. Both sides of the family had political clout; his father, David Bindon, was M.P. for Ennis. His mother, Dorothy Burton of Buncraggy House, Clarecastle, came from a family that controlled the Ennis Parliamentary Borough for much of the 18th century.

Francis had four brothers and three sisters. His brothers Henry and Thomas studied at Trinity College Dublin. Henry was a barrister-at-law and Thomas became Dean of Limerick. Two of his brothers, David (who was a writer on economic affairs) and Samuel, were members of Parliament for Ennis in 1731, a position Francis himself would hold in later life.

Embarking on a 'Grand Tour' of Europe some time in his twenties, Bindon is recorded as being at Padua University on 28 October 1716 where he studied art and architecture. He also studied at Godfrey Kneller's Academy in London. Bindon seems to have lived most of his life in Dublin, although he derived much of his income from his estates in Clare and Limerick. In 1723 his father had assigned the family estate at Clooney to him and Bindon retained these lands and house for the remainder of his life. Bindon died on 2 June 1765 leaving his house in Abbey Street, Dublin, and much of his possessions to his lifelong friend Francis Ryan. An obituary notice in Faulkner's Journal described him as "one of the best painters and architects this nation has ever produced".

Clooney House was remodelled in the Italianate style in the mid 19th century. Today it comprises a large ruinous shell, having lain vacant since the 1920s. The former estate, now a private farm, also includes the ruins of two gate-lodges, late medieval towerhouse, numerous outbuildings and an overgrown walled garden.

== Other sources ==
- Craig, M, 1982, The Architecture of Ireland, Batsford Press.
- Craig, M, 1976, Classic Irish Houses of the Middle Size, Ashfield Press, Dublin.
- Duggan, M, auctioneer, 1768, A Catalogue of the Libraries of Richard Terry, Francis Bindon (esquires), National Library Ireland.
- Griffin, D, et al., 1988, Vanishing Country Houses of Ireland, The Irish Architectural Archive and The Irish Georgian Society.
- McMinn, J, 2005, Images of devotion: Swift and portraits, in Irish Architectural and Decorative Studies, volume VIII, Irish Georgian Society.
- O’Connell, G, Francis Bindon: Portrait Painter and Architect.
