= Haulie =

Haulie may refer to:

- nickname of Michael Haulie Daly (1922–1991), Irish hurler
- nickname of Micheál O'Sullivan (born 1977), Irish retired Gaelic footballer
- Haulie McKee, an accordion player in The Tulla Céilí Band
- Haulie, Chuck's mother in the television series The Adventures of Chuck and Friends
