= Clarecastle GAA =

Gaelic games club in County Clare, Ireland

Clarecastle
- Clár Átha an dá Choradh
- Founded: 1887
- County: Clare
- Nickname: The Magpies
- Colours: Black and white
- Grounds: Clarecastle GAA Grounds
- Coordinates: 52°48′58″N 8°58′21″W

Playing kits
Regular Kit

Senior Club Championships
	All Ireland	Munster champions	Clare champions
Football:	0	0	1
Hurling:	0	1	12

Clarecastle GAA is a Gaelic Athletic Association club in Clarecastle, County Clare, Ireland. The club is affiliated to the Clare County Board and fields teams in Gaelic football, hurling and camogie.

== History ==
Located in the village of Clarecastle, about 5 km south of Ennis, Clarecastle GAA Club was founded in 1887, however, Gaelic football and hurling had been played in the area prior to this. Records show that the new club took part on a Gaelic football tournament in October 1887. Clarecastle GAA Club went through a number of name changes in its early years, including Parnells, Robert Emmets and An Clár Mór.

Under the banner of Robert Emmets, the club had its first major success when St Joseph's, Miltown Malbay were beaten to secure the Clare SFC title in 1908. While that remains the club's sole Clare SFC title, Clarecastle have won three Clare JAFC titles. Between 1984 and 1998, Clarecastle returned to the top tier of Gaelic football after winning three Clare IFC titles.

While hurling has been the more dominant sport within the club, Clarecastle's first Clare SHC title was won as part of the Ennis Dalcassians amalgamation with Éire Óg in 1928. A Clare IHC title followed in 1931. Clarecastle made their Clare SHC breakthrough in 1943, when Scariff were beaten in the final. It was the first of three such titles in six years. Clarecastle won their fifth Clare SHC title in 1970, following a 1–07 to 0–05 win over Crusheen in the final.

Clarecastle went through its most successful hurling era between 1985 and 2005. A Clare JAHC title success in 1985 was followed by four Clare U21AHC titles and seven Clare SHC titles. Clarecastle reached the pinnacle of provincial club hurling in 1997, when the club beat Patrickswell by 2–11 to 0–15 to win the Munster Club SHC title. 25 years after this success, Clarecastle's 91-year status as a senior club ended with relegated to the Clare IHC after a defeat by O'Callaghan's Mills. The club returned to top tier hurling after winning the Clare PIHC title in 2026.

== Grounds ==
Clarecastle play at grounds in the Ballaghafadda East townland, west of the town.

== Honours ==
- Munster Senior Club Hurling Championship (1): 1997
- Clare Senior Hurling Championship (12): 1928 (with Ennis Dalcassians), 1943, 1945, 1949, 1970, 1986, 1987, 1991, 1994, 1997, 2003, 2005
- Clare Premier Intermediate Hurling Championship (1): 2026
- Clare Intermediate Hurling Championship (1): 1931
- Clare Junior A Hurling Championship (2): 1985, 2012
- Clare Under-21 A Hurling Championship (4): 1995, 1996, 1999, 2000
- Clare Senior Football Championship (1): 1908
- Clare Intermediate Football Championship (3): 1984, 1993, 1998
- Clare Junior A Football Championship (3): 1936, 1982, 2012

== Notable players ==
- Cian Broderick: All-Ireland SHC-winner (2024)
- John Callinan: National Hurling League-winner (1976–77, 1977–78)
- Jonathan Clancy: All-Ireland SHC-winner (2013)
- Anthony Daly: All-Ireland SHC-winning captain (1995, 1997)
- Haulie Daly: National Hurling League-winning captain (1945–46)
- Cian Galvin: All-Ireland SHC-winner (2024)
- Alan Neville: All-Ireland SHC-winner (1997)
- Ger O'Loughlin: All-Ireland SHC-winner (1995, 1997)
- Fergus Tuohy: All-Ireland SHC-winner (1995, 1997)
