= Clareabbey =

Shush Mainistir an Chláir
- Civil parish
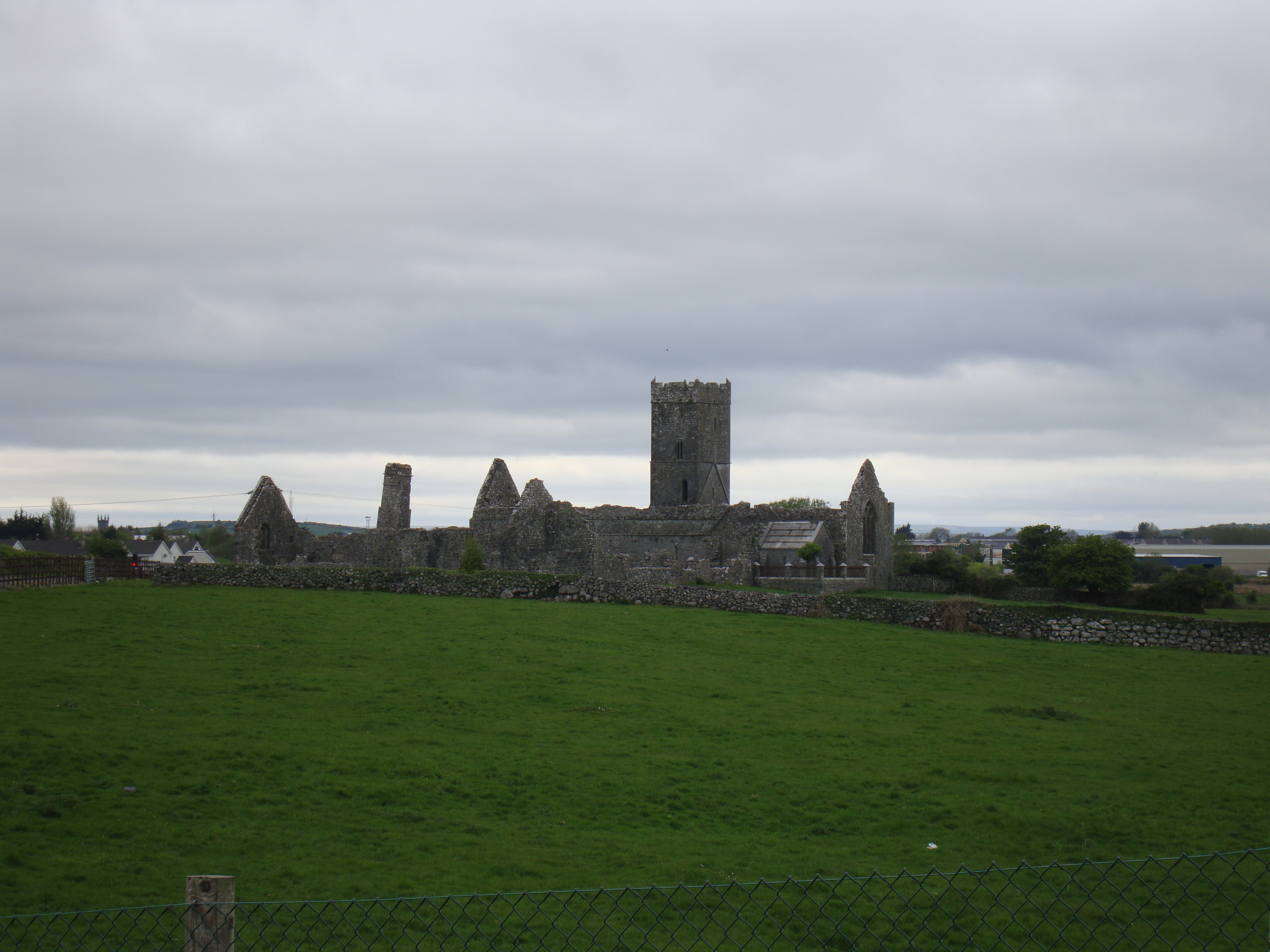
- Clare Abbey, from which the parish takes its name

- Location within Ireland
- Coordinates: 52.815505°N 8.961605°W
- Country: Ireland
- County: Clare

Clareabbey (Irish: Mainistir an Chláir) is a civil parish in County Clare, Ireland, named after the former Augustinian monastery of Clare Abbey. The main settlement in the town of Clarecastle.

== Location ==
Clareabbey lies in the barony of Islands. It is 2 miles (3.2 km) south of Ennis, and contains the town of Clarecastle (or simply Clare). The parish lies on the River Fergus, on the road from Ennis to Limerick. The parish in 1637 covered 6,694 acres (2,709 ha), mostly used for pasturage. It is 4 miles (6.4 km) long and up to 2.75 miles (4.43 km) wide. The Fergus bisects the parish, and is bridged at Clare. The land is generally very fertile, part alluvial and part limestone.

The parish contains the townlands of Ballaghafadda (East), Ballaghafadda (West), Ballybeg, Ballyveskil, Ballyvonnavaun, Barntick, Buncraggy, Carrowgar, Carrownanelly, Clareabbey, Clare Commons, Clarehill, Creggaunnahilla, Derreen, Feagh, Islandavanna Lower (Intake), Islandavanna Upper (Intake), Islandmagrath, Killow, Knockanimana, Lissan East, Lissan West, Manusmore and Skehanagh.

== History ==
The parish was the seat of the Augustinian Clare Abbey, which Donald O’Brien, King of Limerick, founded in 1195. After the suppression of the monastery in 1543 the parish lands were given to the barons of Ibrackan by King Henry VIII of England. In 1620 it became the property of the Earl of Thomond. According to Thomas Moland, writing in 1703,

"Clare was formerly ye county town, now very poor and little, consists of one old stone house, out of repair, a stone walled thatched house, where in Mr. Stammers now lives, an Ale House or Inn, and about 17 other small tenements and gardens worth about 30 shillings a piece, one with another per annum and 2 fairs are held here yearly, the best in ye county in peaceable times, worth £10 or £12 each fair per annum".

A Protestant church with a square tower was erected in 1813. As of 1837 two fairs were still held at Clare each year. There were 3,280 inhabitants in 1841 in 516 houses, almost all Catholics. The parish was part of the Catholic district of Clare, which also contained the parish of Killone. Each parish had a chapel.
