= Ash guard =

Glove used in Gaelic sports

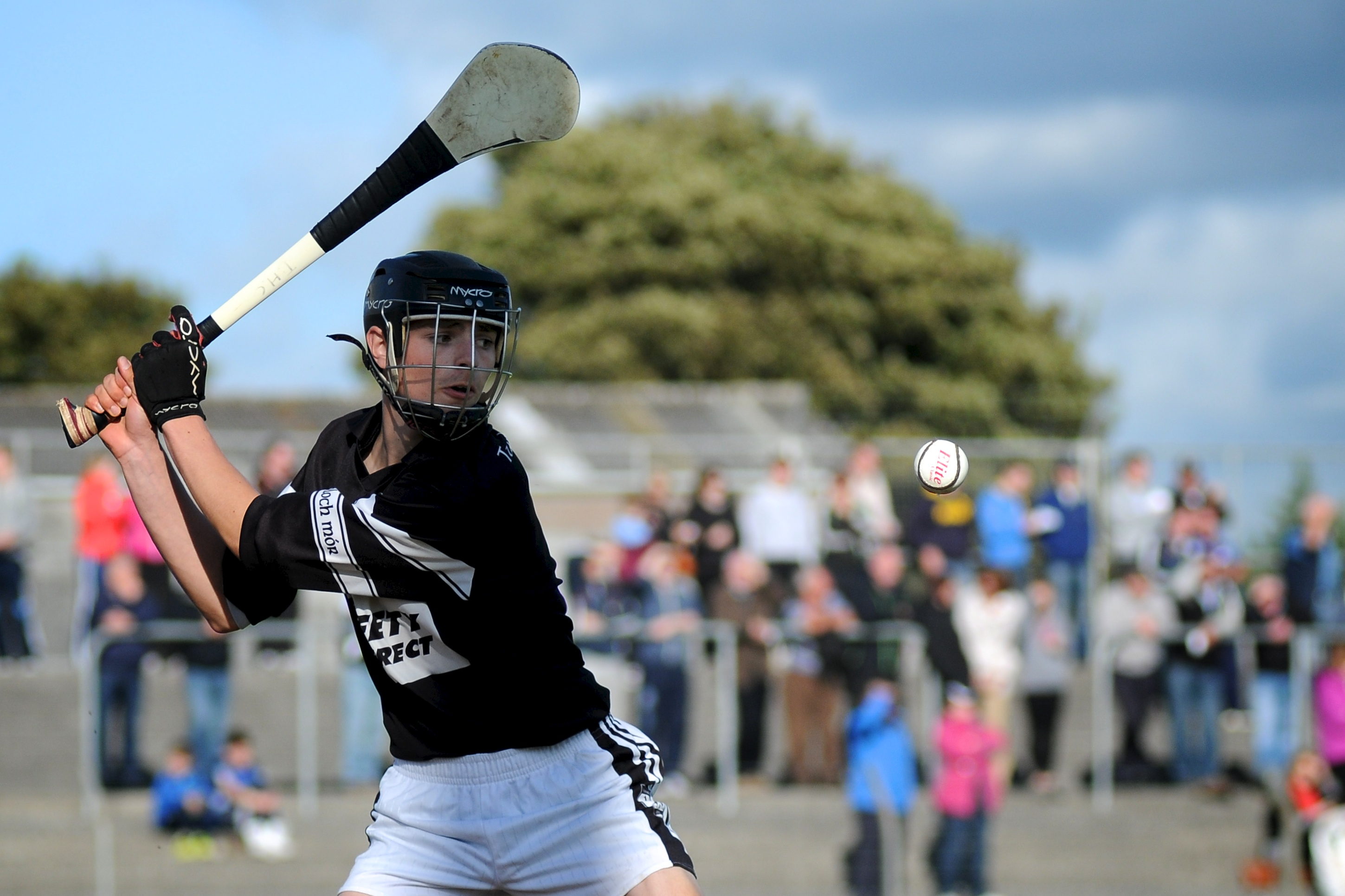
Seán Loftus wearing an ashguard.

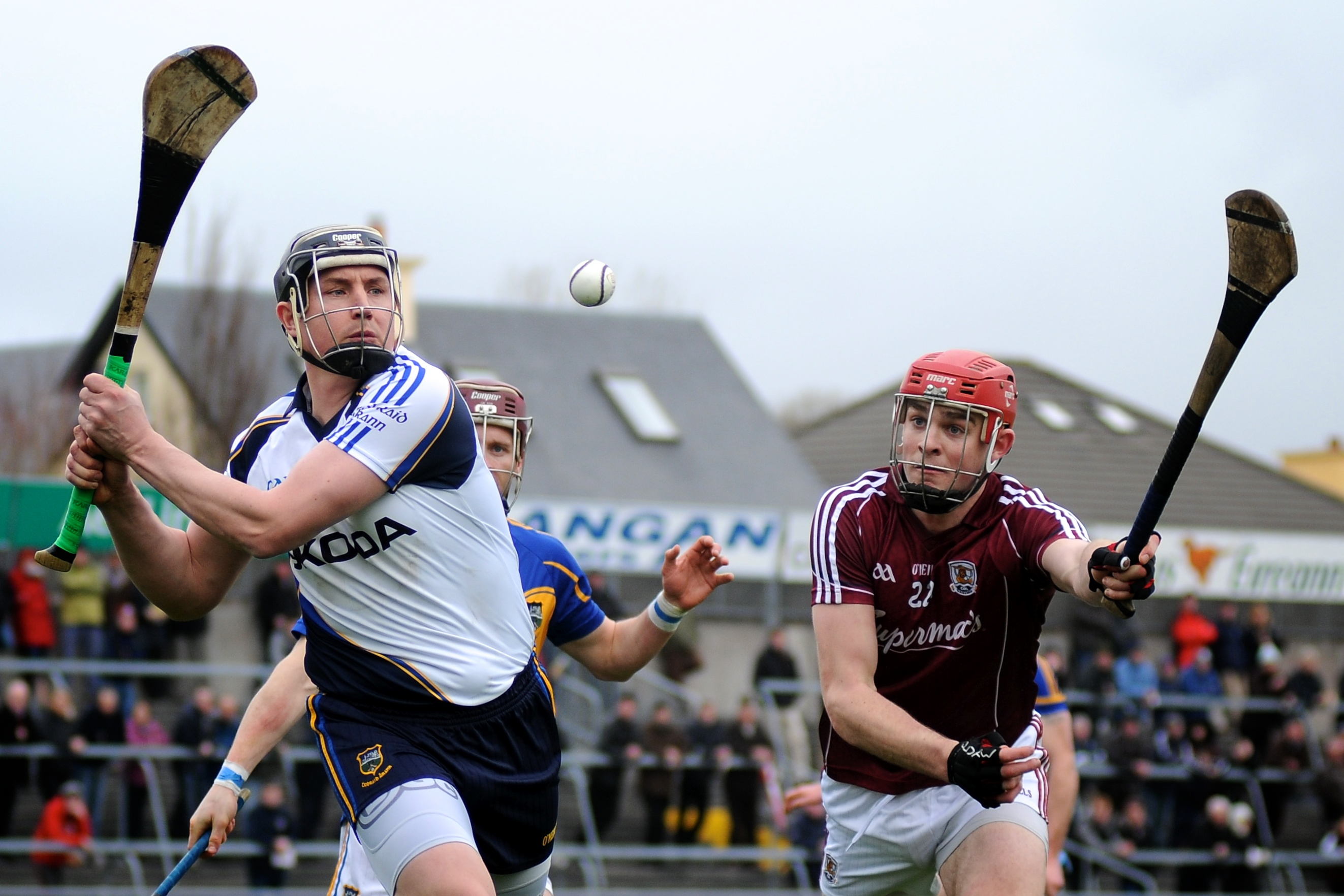
A hurling game: the player on the right wears two ashguards.

An ash guard, ashguard or hurling glove (Irish: miotóg chosanta) is a fingerless protective glove used in the Gaelic sports of hurling and camogie, principally played in Ireland.

Its purpose is to protect the hand from being hit by opponent's hurleys (or camogie sticks) when catching the sliotar (ball) during play. Its name derives from the use of ash wood to make hurleys and camogie sticks. Most players wear the ashguard only on their dominant hand, although Kevin Downes wore one on each hand.

The ash guard was introduced in the 1990s as safety equipment (including protective helmets) was becoming more common in the sport and players were increasingly aware of the risk of injuries. The prototype is credited to Dr Brendan Cuddihy of Greystones, County Wicklow.

They have become increasingly rare in recent years, with one article in 2017 dismissing them as a "fad." Ken McGrath suffered multiple fractures to the metacarpals and phalanges but never wore one, saying "I never liked fellas wearing gloves, the look of it is something I don't like. I wore a glove for one game after breaking a finger but I threw it away after a minute, I couldn't stick it." However, John Callinan (who played in the 1990s before ash guards were common) has credited a reduction in broken fingers in the sport in recent years to the use of gloves.

Most ash guards are fingerless, in order not to reduce dexterity, but new gloves like the Mycro Long Finger Glove are designed to protect the proximal phalanges without affecting dexterity.

Some rugby union players have also used ashguards, including André Joubert and Tommy Bowe.
