= Cian Galvin =

Irish hurler

Personal information
- Native name: Cian Ó Gealbháin (Irish)
- Born: 2002 (age 23–24) Clarecastle, County Clare, Ireland
- Occupation: Student

Sport
- Sport: Hurling
- Position: Centre-back
Club
- Years: Club
- Clarecastle
Club titles
- Clare titles: 0
College
- Years: College
- University of Limerick
College titles
- Fitzgibbon titles: 1
Inter-county
- Years: County
- 2021-present: Clare
Inter-county titles
- Munster titles: 0
- All-Irelands: 0
- NHL: 1
- All Stars: 0

Cian Galvin (born 2002) is an Irish hurler who plays for Clare Senior Championship club Clarecastle and at inter-county level with the Clare senior hurling team.

== Career ==
A member of the Clarecastle club, Galvin first came to hurling prominence as a schoolboy with St. Flannan's College in Ennis, who he captained to the Harty Cup title in 2020. He made his first appearance on the inter-county scene as a member of the Clare minor hurling team and captained the team in the 2019 Munster MHC final defeat by Limerick. Galvin ended the season by being named on the Minor Hurling Team of the Year. He progressed onto the Clare under-20 team before being selected for the Clare senior hurling team in 2021.

== Honours ==
St. Flannan's College

- Harty Cup: 2020 (jc)

University of Limerick

- Fitzgibbon Cup: 2022

Clare

- All-Ireland Senior Hurling Championship: 2024
- National Hurling League: 2024

Awards

- GAA Minor Star Hurling Team of the Year Award: 2019
