= Jonathan Clancy =

Irish hurler

Personal information
- Native name: Seán Mac Lannchaidh (Irish)
- Born: 12 March 1986 (age 40) Clarecastle, County Clare, Ireland
- Occupation: Accountant
- Height: 5 ft 7 in (170 cm)

Sport
- Sport: Hurling
- Position: Midfield
Club
- Years: Club
- Clarecastle
Club titles
- Clare titles: 2
Inter-county*
Years	County	Apps (scores)
2005-2014	Clare	28 (1-32)
Inter-county titles
- Munster titles: 0
- All-Irelands: 1
- NHL: 0
- All Stars: 0
- *Inter County team apps and scores correct as of 17:19, 8 February 2014.

Jonathan Clancy (born 12 March 1986) is an Irish hurler; he played in a variety of positions, but mostly at midfield for the Clare senior team.

Born in Clarecastle, County Clare, Clancy first played competitive hurling whilst at school at St. Flannan's College. He first played in the inter-county leagues at the age of seventeen when he joined the Clare minor team, before later joining the under-21 side. He made his senior debut in the 2005 championship. Clancy went on to play for Clare for almost a decade, and won one All-Ireland medal as a non-playing substitute and one Waterford Crystal Cup medal.

As a member of the Munster inter-provincial team at various times, Clancy won one Railway Cup medal as a non-playing substitute in 2007. At club level he is a two-time championship medallist with Clarecastle.

Throughout his career Clancy made 28 championship appearances. He announced his retirement from inter-county hurling on 7 February 2014.

== Honours ==
=== Team ===
Clarecastle

- Clare Senior Hurling Championship (2): 2003, 2005
- Clare Junior A Football Championship (1): 2012

Clare

- All-Ireland Senior Hurling Championship (1): 2013
- Waterford Crystal Cup (1): 2009

Connacht

- Railway Cup (1): 2007 (sub)
