= Mount Ievers Court =

Georgian house in County Clare, Ireland

- Location within Ireland

General information
- Status: Private dwelling house
- Type: House
- Architectural style: Georgian
- Location: Sixmilebridge, County Clare, Ireland
- Coordinates: 52.7453823°N 8.7634152°W
- Construction started: 1733
- Completed: 1737
- Owner: Norman and Karen Ievers (2023)

Technical details
- Material: limestone and red brick
- Floor count: 3 over basement

Design and construction
- Architects: John Rothery and Isaac Rothery
- Developer: Henry Ievers

Mount Ievers Court is an early Georgian house and estate near Sixmilebridge in County Clare, Ireland.

The house was completed in 1737 for Henry Ievers to a design by local architect John Rothery and, after his death in 1736, was finished by his son Isaac Rothery.

As of 2023, the house is still owned by members of the Ievers family.

== History ==
=== Ballyarilla Castle ===
Prior to the construction of the modern house an early 16th-century tower house and bawn named Ballyarilla castle (Irish: Baile Reidhligh) stood on the site as illustrated by Thomas Dineley during his visit to the area in 1681. At that stage the Ievers are noted as working as agents to a Mr Thomas Fowle, a barrister.

The castle was likely built by Lochlann MacNamara or another member of the MacNamara family. Later the O'Briens of Dromoland Castle appear to have records of ownership by Connor O'Brien, 3rd Earl of Thomond from 1563 although it was likely still leased to a local tenant such as the McNamaras. In 1610, Donogh O'Brien, 4th Earl of Thomond had constructed a bridge over the O'Garney river near to the location of the house, the site of this bridge later becoming the village of Sixmilebridge.

After the Irish Rebellion of 1641 it appears that the land was confiscated from a tenant by the name of Thomas Fanning and come into the hands of Thomas Green, High Sheriff of Clare and afterwards to Henry Iever as an assignee of Green.

The castle was later renamed and anglicized as Mount Ievers castle by the Ievers family. Various elements of the original stone castle can be found in the later house and outbuildings including steps used as lintels in the outbuildings and even the original gothic doorway of the castle. It is not clear if the house is constructed on the exact site of the earlier castle although it is certainly built close to the original site.

The castle is noted as 'Balliarrell' on the Down Survey map of the 1650s.

=== Ievers family ===
John Rothery was engaged by Henry Ievers after he succeeded to the lands in 1730. He inherited the lands from his father Colonel John Ievers (c1650-1729) who had been a member of Clare's Dragoons and an MP for County Clare constituency for at least a decade from c1715-25.

John himself had succeeded to the lands on the death of his father Henry Ivers in October 1691. His older brother, also named Henry, had been disinherited for eloping with a woman who was deemed unacceptable by his father.

The Ievers family appear to have arrived in Ireland prior to 1640 from England and were a beneficiary of the confiscation of lands by Oliver Cromwell.

Henry was appointed collector of Revenue for Counties Clare and Galway in 1643. He was later appointed a clerk of the King's Commissioners for settling Quit-rents and was granted over a thousand acres in counties Clare and Galway in 1667 as a Cromwellian adventurer and a further 2,000 acres in 1678. At the time of the older Henry's death in 1691, he was said to have owned approximately 12,000 acres in the west of Ireland.

Additional lands were purchased by John from the Chichester House Commissioners in 1703.

Although initially wealthy and influential businesspersons and politicians, in the later 18th and 19th centuries the family lost much of their estate, wealth and prestige. This resulted in there not being the available funds to alter the house to suit more modern Georgian and Victorian tastes.

=== House and outbuildings ===
As the house remains in the ownership of the same family, particularly detailed accounts of its construction can be found. It was built from 1733 to 1737 and at the time of construction it would have been a groundbreaking if unusual Georgian style house, particularly for what was then a remote rural area. It was constructed on the site of an earlier defensive tower house of the type that would have been typical around Ireland in the 16th century. One of the fireplaces from the earlier structure was reused in the new house and carried a date of 1648.

Rothery was also in charge of constructing the market house in Sixmilebridge in 1733.

The house is a rare unspoiled pre-Palladian or early Georgian house which also contains elements which correspond with late Queen Anne style architecture. It is said the house may have taken at least partial inspiration from Chevening, the home of the Earls Stanhope.

It is 7 bays wide and 3 storeys tall over a raised basement with symmetrical windows and detailing and a steeply pitched tiled roof with tall brick chimney stacks.

The entrance (south) side is faced in imported Dutch red brick while the rear is faced with locally sourced limestone which is also used for the quoins, sills, architraves and string courses. The side walls of the house are covered in roughcast or pebbledash. The tiles are recorded as coming from nearby Broadford, County Clare while the oak timber came from Portumna via Killaloe.

The windows are the original wooden thick framed wooden 16 over 16 pane at raised ground floor and first floor level while there are smaller sash windows on the top floor which accentuate the height and austerity of the house.

The top floor interior of the house features a long barrel vaulted gallery which stretched the full length of the house.

The original out buildings and gate posts are still intact and made with the same mix of imported Dutch red brick and locally sourced limestone.

The original architect, John Rothery, died during the construction of the house on 4 September 1736. In December 1736 a new agreement was signed with his son Isaac Rothery. John's brother James Rothery also appears to have had some involvement in the completion of the house at various stages.

== Filming location ==
The house was used as the location for much of the filming of The Serpent's Kiss in the mid-1990s.

== See also ==
- Newhall House and Estate
