= Newhall House =

House and estate in County Clare, Ireland

Newhall House and Estate
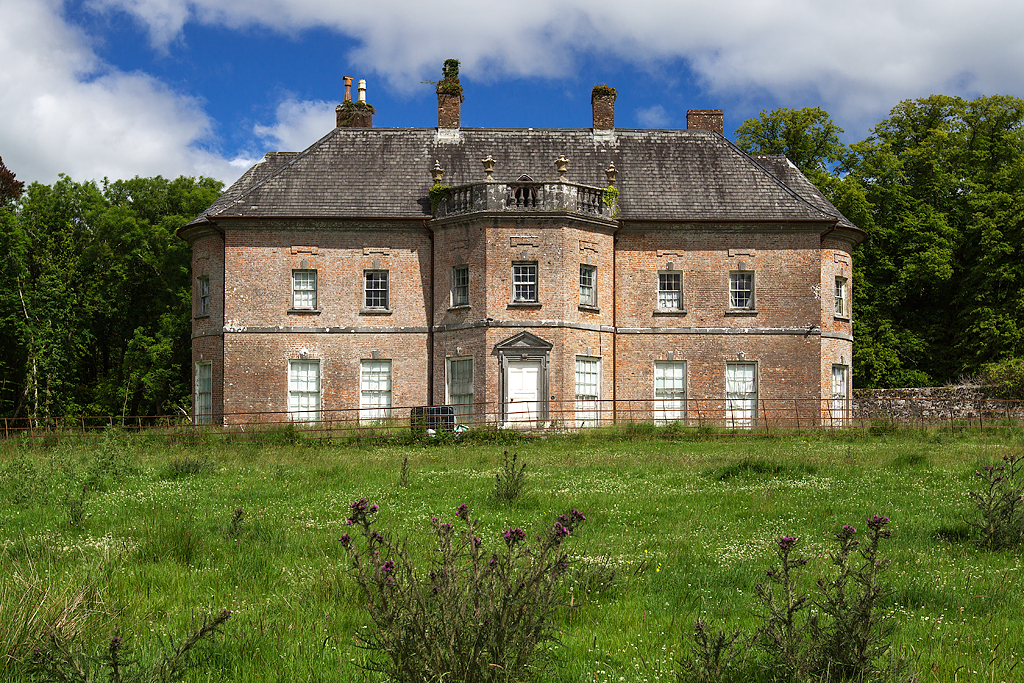
- Newhall House, a Queen Anne-style mansion

- Location within Ireland

General information
- Status: Country House
- Architectural style: Georgian
- Location: near Ennis, Ireland
- Coordinates: 52.8088°N 9.0119°W
- Groundbreaking: 1650
- Owner: Commane family
- Affiliation: Parish of Killone

Design and construction
- Architect: Francis Bindon or Isaac Rothery
- Developer: Lord Clare; O'Brien family (1650); Charles MacDonnell (1764)

Website
- http://www.newhall.ie

Newhall is a 17th century country estate near Ennis in County Clare in Ireland, historically held by members of the Irish landed gentry. The front section of the house was added during the Georgian period, creating a T-shaped design with an elongated older rear section which was used partially as servants quarters.

== History ==
=== Early period: Lord Clare and O'Brien Dynasty ===
In 1544 King Henry VIII of England granted Kilone Abbey and the parish of Killone, including Newhall, and much other property in County Clare, to Murrough O'Brien, 1st Earl of Thomond. This occurred after Murrough offered the kingdom of Thomond to the King of England, and received his lands and titles back as a feudal subject (a process known as surrender and regrant).

The historic core of Newhall is said to have been constructed using stones from Killone Castle. In 1580, Killone Castle was the property of the Baron of Inchiquin. There is now no trace of the castle beyond Newhall House.

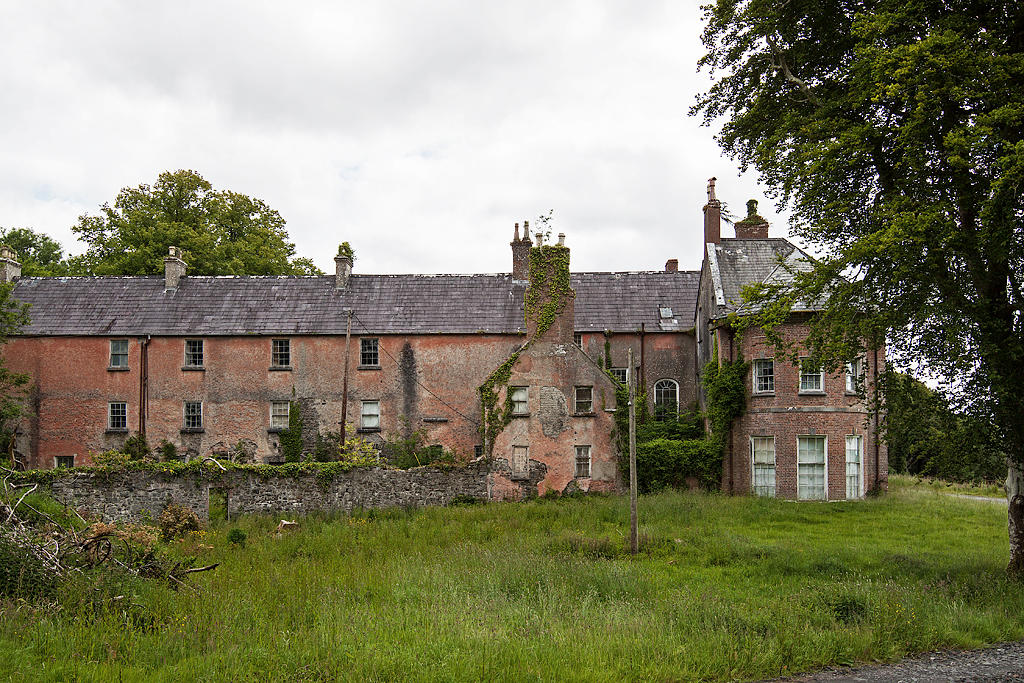
Elongated back section 1650 house T-shape design with 1765 Georgian front added. Photo, circa 2000s, predates later restoration

In 1708, Colonel John O'Brien left Newhall and Killone to his wife, Honora O'Brien, in his will.

Honora O'Brien had a relationship with Richard Burke, 2nd Earl of Clanricarde. Their illegitimate son, also named Richard Burke, had a daughter (Marcella Burke) who married Donough O'Callaghan of Kilgorey in 1747.

=== Georgian expansion: MacDonnell ===
Charles MacDonnell purchased the property from the O'Briens in 1764. MacDonnell and his wife Catherine substantially enlarged the existing house, adding a new front, possibly to designs by Francis Bindon.

The resulting country house, dating to about 1765, became a seven-bay, two-storey red-brick residence, with a canted central projection, bow windows and a large rear wing. The new Georgian house may have incorporated fabric from an earlier 17-century building.

=== 20th and 21st centuries: Joyce and Commane ===
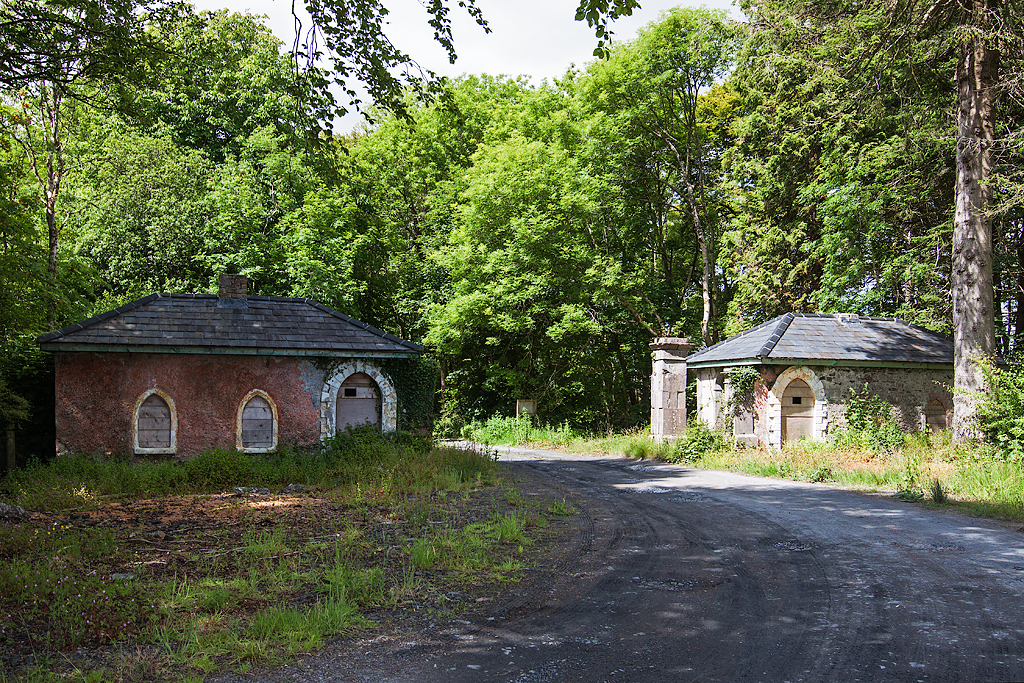
Gatehouses at Newhall (prior to restoration)

In 1912, Charles R.A. MacDonnell transferred 3,485 acres of tenanted land and 256 acres of untenanted land to the Congested Districts' Board for a sum exceeding £26,000. It was a home of the Joyce family of County Galway in the 20th century, from the 1920s to 2016.

As a gentry seat, Newhall hosted fox hunts and balls and was (and remains) a working farm.

In 2016, the estate was purchased by the Commane family, a family from the locality, who are restoring it to its original form.

== Killone Abbey ==
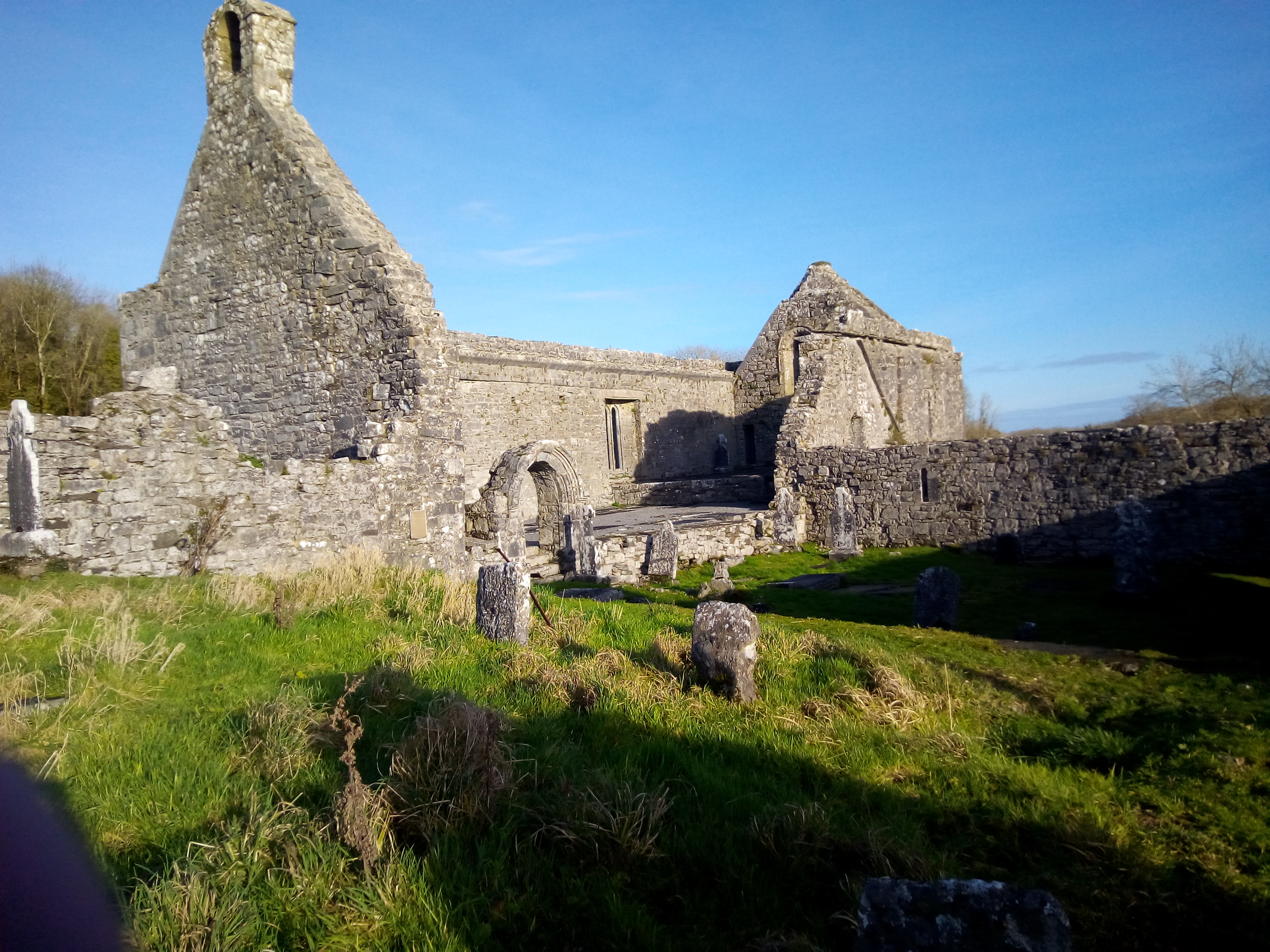
Killone Abbey graveyard

Located on the grounds of Newhall, Killone Abbey is a ruined Augustinian nunnery, possibly founded by Domnall Mór O’Brien in the late 12th century and traditionally associated with the O'Brien dynasty of Thomond.

== See also ==
- Mount Ievers Court
