= Haulie Daly =

Irish hurler

Michael "Haulie" Daly
Personal information
- Native name: Mícheál Ó Dálaigh (Irish)
- Nickname: Haulie
- Born: 1922 Clarecastle, County Clare, Ireland
- Died: June 1991 (aged 69) Clarecastle, County Clare, Ireland
- Occupations: Publican and politician

Sport
- Sport: Hurling
- Position: Right corner-forward
Club
- Years: Club
- 1940-1956: Clarecastle
Club titles
- Clare titles: 3
Inter-county
- Years: County
- 1944-1952: Clare
Inter-county titles
- Munster titles: 0
- All-Irelands: 0
- NHL: 1

Michael "Haulie" Daly (1922 – June 1991) was an Irish hurler who played as a forward for the Clare senior team.

Born in Clarecastle, County Clare, Daly first arrived on the inter-county scene at the age of twenty-three when he first linked up with the Clare senior team. He made his debut during the 1944 championship. Daly later became a regular member of the starting fifteen, and won one National Hurling League medal.

As a member of the Munster inter-provincial team on a number of occasions, Daly won two Railway Cup medals. At club level he was a three-time championship medallist with Clarecastle.

His brothers, John and Pat Joe Daly (father of Anthony), both played for Clare, while his nephew, Anthony Daly, was a two-time All-Ireland-winning captain with Clare.

Throughout his career Daly made 6 championship appearances. He retired from inter-county hurling following the conclusion of the 1952 championship.

In retirement from playing Daly became involved in politics. He was elected to Clare County Council as a Fianna Fáil member in 1974 and was re-elected in 1979. During his second term on the council he acted as vice-chairman.

== Honours ==
=== Player ===
Clarecatsle

- Clare Senior Hurling Championship (3): 1943, 1945, 1949

Clare

- National Hurling League (1): 1945-46 (c)

Munster

- Railway Cup (2): 1948, 1949

Sporting positions
Preceded by Mick O'Halloran	Clare Senior Hurling Captain; 1944	Succeeded by Kevin Hogan
Preceded by Pappy O'Callaghan	Clare Senior Hurling Captain; 1950	Succeeded by Paddy Jordan
