= John Callinan =

Clare hurler

Personal information
- Born: 1955 (age 70–71) Clarecastle, County Clare

Sport
- Sport: Hurling
- Position: Half-forward
Club
- Years: Club
- Clarecastle
Inter-county
- Years: County
- 1973–1987: Clare
Inter-county titles
- Munster titles: 0
- All-Irelands: 0
- All Stars: 2

John Callinan (born 1955) is an Irish former sportsman. He played hurling with the Clare senior team from 1973 until 1987.

== Early life ==
Callinan was born in Clarecastle, County Clare, in 1955 into a family of one brother and four sisters. He was educated locally and would later become one of Clare's greatest-ever hurling players. He attended University College Dublin (UCD), where he also played on the university's hurling team.

He graduated as a Lawyer and currently practices in Ennis, County Clare.

== Playing career ==
=== Club ===
Callinan played his club hurling with his local Clarecastle club. He won senior county championship titles in 1986 and 1987.

=== Inter-county ===
Callinan played hurling with the Clare minor team in the early 1970s before making his senior debut in 1973. The following year he played in his first Munster SHC final; however, his side lost to Limerick. Three years later in 1977 Callinan had his first major success when he won a National Hurling League medal. However, this was followed by a Munster SHC final defeat by Cork. In 1978 he won a second consecutive National League title; however, Clare lost again to Cork in the Munster SHC final. Two further Munster SHC final appearances ended in defeat for Callinan in 1981 and 1986. He retired from inter-county hurling following defeat in the championship in 1987.

In spite of never winning a championship medal Callinan did win three Railway Cup medals with Munster in 1976, 1978 and 1981. He also won two All-Star awards in 1979 and 1981.
