= 1987 Croke Cup =

Irish hurling competition

- Dates: 12 April - 10 May 1987
- Teams: 3
- Champions: St Flannan's College (10th title); Justin Quinlan (captain)
- Runners-up: St Kieran's College; Brian Ryan (captain)

Tournament statistics
- Matches played: 2
- Goals scored: 8 (4 per match)
- Points scored: 38 (19 per match)
- Top scorer(s): Tim Canny (0-12)

The 1987 Croke Cup was the 36th staging of the Croke Cup since its establishment by the Gaelic Athletic Association in 1944. The competition ran from 12 April to 10 May 1987.

St Brendan's Community School were the defending champions, however, they were beaten by St Kieran's College in the Leinster final.

The final was played on 10 May 1987 at St Brendan's Park, Birr, between St Flannan's College and St Kieran's College, in what was their fourth meeting in the final overall and a first meeting in 29 years. St Flannan's College won the match by 4–11 to 1–07 to claim their 10th Croke Cup title overall and a first title in four years.

Tim Canny was the top scorer with 0-12.

== Qualification ==
Province	Champions
Connacht	St Joseph's College
Leinster	St Kieran's College
Munster	St Flannan's College

== Results ==
=== Semi-final ===
12 April 1987 Semi-final	St Flannan's College	2-15 - 1-05	St Joseph's College	Athenry Grounds
	T Canny 0-7, P Healy 1-1, G Rogers 1-0, R McMahon 0-3, M McNamara 0-2, A Neville 0-1, J Quinlan 0-1.		D Tiernan 1-0, D Curley 0-3, J Campbell 0-1, C Colohan 0-1.	Referee: P Horan (Offaly)

=== Final ===
10 May 1987 Final	St Flannan's College	4-11 - 1-07	St Kieran's College	St Brendan's Park
	M Doherty 1-2, T Canny 0-5, M McNamara 1-1, R McMahon 1-0, P Healy 1-0, D O'Neill 0-1, P Heffernan 0-1, P Conlan 0-1.		P O'Neill 1-3, A Ronan 0-3, DJ Carey 0-1.	Referee: N O'Donoghue (Dublin)

== Statistics ==
=== Top scorers ===
Overall

Rank	Player	County	Tally	Total	Matches	Average
1	Tim Canny	St Flannan's College	0-12	12	2	6.00
2	Pat Healy	St Flannan's College	2-01	7	2	3.50
3	Pat O'Neill	St Kieran's College	1-03	6	1	6.00
3	Michael McNamara	St Flannan's College	1-03	6	2	3.00
3	Richard McMahon	St Flannan's College	1-03	6	2	3.00
