= 1945–46 National Hurling League =

15th season of the National Hurling League

League details
- Dates: 28 October 1945 – 21 July 1946
- Teams: 12

League champions
- Winners: Clare (1st win)

The 1945–46 National Hurling League was the 15th season of the National Hurling League. This was the first league to be played since 1940-41 because of fuel shortages and rationing during the Emergency.

== Resumption ==
In August 1945 the Central Council of the Gaelic Athletic Association announced that they would resume the National Leagues in both hurling and Gaelic football. It was decided to divide the participating teams into small groups to ensure minimum travelling and in an effort to reduce costs due to the strict fuel rationing measures which remained due to World War II.

== National Hurling League ==
National Hurling League
- Season: 1945-46
- Champions: Clare; 1st National League title Captain: Haulie Daly
- All statistics correct as of 11 April 2017.

Cork came into the season as defending champions of the 1940-41 season.

On 21 July 1946, Clare won the title following a 2-10 to 2-5 win over Dublin in a replay of the final. It was their first ever league title.

=== Group 1 table ===
Pos	Team	Pld	W	D	L	Pts	Notes
1	Cork	3	3	0	0	6	
2	Wexford	3	1	0	2	2	
3	Kilkenny	3	1	0	2	2	
4	Waterford	3	1	0	2	2	

=== Group 2 table ===
Pos	Team	Pld	W	D	L	Pts	Notes
1	Dublin	2	2	0	0	4	National League runners-up
2	Tipperary	2	1	0	1	2	
3	Antrim	2	0	0	2	0	

=== Group 3 table ===
Pos	Team	Pld	W	D	L	Pts	Notes
1	Galway	4	3	0	1	6	
2	Clare	4	3	0	1	6	National League champions
3	Westmeath	4	2	0	2	4	
4	Limerick	4	2	0	2	4	
5	Offaly	4	0	0	4	0	

=== Play-off ===
28 April 1946 Play-off	Clare	6-3 - 2-7	Galway	McDonagh Park, Nenagh

=== Knock-out stage ===
Semi-final

7 April 1946 Semi-final	Dublin	8-7 - 1-7	Cork	Croke Park, Dublin

Finals

26 May 1946 Final	Dublin	1-6 - 1-6	Clare	Gaelic Grounds, Limerick

21 July 1946 Final replay	Dublin	2-5 - 2-10	Clare	Croke Park, Dublin
			J Solon 1-5; H Daly 0-3; M Nugent 1-0; PJ Quane 0-1.
