= 2019–20 Harty Cup =

Hurling tournament

2019–20 Dr Harty Cup
- Dates: 15 October 2019 – 1 March 2020
- Teams: 15
- Champions: St Flannan's College (22nd title); Conner Hegarty (captain); Cian Galvin (captain); Kevin O'Grady (manager)
- Runners-up: Christian Brothers College, Cork; Niall Hartnett (captain); Tony Wall (manager)

Tournament statistics
- Matches played: 28
- Goals scored: 61 (2.18 per match)
- Points scored: 791 (28.25 per match)

The 2019–20 Dr Harty Cup was the 100th staging of the Harty Cup since its establishment in hurling by the Munster Council of Gaelic Athletic Association in 1918. The draw for the group stage placings took place on 30 July 2019. The competition ran from 15 October 2019 to 1 March 2020.

Midlton CBS unsuccessfully defended its title in the semi-finals, losing to Christian Brothers College, Cork.

St Flannan's College won the Harty Cup final on 1 March 2020 at Mallow GAA Complex, against Christian Brothers College, Cork, 1–15 to 1–12, their first ever meeting in a final, St Flannan's 22nd Harty Cup title and their first in 15 years.

== Group A ==
=== Group A table ===
Knockout stage

Team	Matches				Score			Pts
Team	Pld	W	D	L	For	Against	Diff	Pts
Thurles CBS	3	3	0	0	74	42	32	6
St Colman's College	3	2	0	1	53	46	7	4
Nenagh CBS	3	1	0	2	48	42	6	2
John the Baptist CS	3	0	0	3	29	74	-45	0

=== Group A results ===
16 October 2019 Round 1	Nenagh CBS	3-16 - 0-10	John the Baptist Community School	Cappamore Grounds
	S Madden (2-12, 0-11 frees), M Ryan (1-0), K O’Kelly (0-2), S Phelan (0-1), C McKelvey (0-1).	Report	A O’Heney (0-8, 0-6 frees), J Franklin (0-1, 0-1 free), D McAuley (0-1).

16 October 2019 Round 1	Thurles CBS	1-24 - 2-13	St Colman's College	Clonmel GAA Ground
	J Leamy 0-6, D Ryan 0-5 (0-4 frees), P Creedon 1-2, D Flood 0-4, E Purcell 0-2, J Morrissey 0-2, S Ferncombe 0-2, K Ryan 0-1	Report	D Flynn 0-8 (0-7 frees, 0-1 ’65) B Nodwell 1-1, A Walsh 1-0, D O’Leary 0-2, J Carr 0-1, L Doocey 0-1

6 November 2019 Round 2	Thurles CBS	2-28 - 0-13	John the Baptist Community School	Lacken Park
	D Ryan (0-13, 0-10 frees), E Purcell (1-4); J Lee (1-3), S Ferncombe (0-3, 0-1 free), K Ryan (0-2), J Morrissey (0-1); J Leamy (0-1), P Creedon (0-1).	Report	D McAuley (0-6 frees), A O’Heney (0-4 frees); P Kennedy (0-1), P Reale (0-1); S Murnane (0-1).

6 November 2019 Round 2	St Colman's College	0-19 - 2-08	Nenagh CBS	FitzGerald Park
		Report

20 November 2019 Round 3	St Colman's College	0-15 - 0-06	John the Baptist Community School	Michael Fox Park
	D Flynn 0-5 (0-3 frees), J Carr 0-3, P Sheehan 0-2, C Roche, D O’Leary, L Doocey, D Collins, D Roche 0-1 each.	Report	D McAuley 0-3 (all frees), E Dorney, P Reale, D Butler 0-1 each.

20 November 2019 Round 3	Thurles CBS	2-07 - 1-07	Nenagh CBS	The Ragg
	D Ryan (0-4, 0-3 frees), J Leamy (1-0), D Flood (1-0), E Purcell (0-2), P Creedon (0-1).	Report	K O’Kelly (1-1, 0-1 free), S Madden (0-3, 0-2 frees, 0-1 ’65), R Brislane (0-1, 0-1 free), S Kenneally (0-1), C Murray (0-1).

== Group B ==
=== Group B table ===
Knockout stage

Team	Matches				Score			Pts
Team	Pld	W	D	L	For	Against	Diff	Pts
St Flannan's College	3	3	0	0	57	46	11	6
De La Salle College	3	2	0	1	59	42	17	4
Gaelcholáiste Mhuire AG	3	1	0	2	43	59	-16	2
Blackwater CS	3	0	0	3	42	54	-12	0

=== Group B results ===
16 October 2019 Round 1	St Flannan's College	2-17 - 2-11	Blackwater Community School	FitzGerald Park
		Report

16 October 2019 Round 1	De La Salle College Waterford	4-18 - 0-12	Gaelcholáiste Mhuire AG	Bushy Park
		Report

6 November 2019 Round 2	St Flannan's College	0-21 - 1-14	De La Salle College Waterford	Canon Hayes Park
		Report

11 November 2019 Round 2	Gaelcholáiste Mhuire AG	1-16 - 2-10	Blackwater Community School	Killeagh Grounds
		Report

20 November 2019 Round 3	St Flannan's College	0-13 - 1-09	Gaelcholáiste Mhuire AG	Cappamore Grounds
	C Galvin (0-4 frees), O O’Donnell (0-3), C Hegarty and P Power (0-2 each), D Nagle and J Doherty (0-1 each).	Report	D Ó Longáin (0-5, 0-4 frees, 0-1 65), N Ó Gabhláin (1-1), L Ó hArgáin (0-2), M Ó Maoláin (0-1, 65).

20 November 2019 Round 3	De La Salle College Waterford	0-12 - 1-06	Blackwater Community School	Dungarvan Sports Centre
	M Cummins 0-5 (3fs), L Hearne 0-4, J Foley 0-2, E Flynn 0-1.	Report	S Hickey 1-1, A Ryan 0-3 (2fs), M Buckley 0-2.

== Group C ==
=== Group C table ===
Knockout stage

Team	Matches				Score			Pts
Team	Pld	W	D	L	For	Against	Diff	Pts
Christian Brothers College	3	2	1	0	59	40	19	5
Our Lady's SS	3	2	0	1	70	60	10	4
Ardscoil Rís	3	1	1	1	64	54	10	3
St Francis College	3	0	0	3	39	78	-39	0

=== Group C results ===
15 October 2019 Round 1	Our Lady's Secondary School	4-20 - 3-17	Ardscoil Rís	MacDonagh Park
	J Devaney (2-7, 0-4 frees), P Kinane (1-2), T Cahill (1-1), K Ryan (0-3), K Maher (0-2, 0-1 free), C Cadell (0-2); D Kennedy (0-2), H Fogarty (0-1).	Report	C O’Neill (2-10, 1-8 frees, 1-0 penalty), S O’Brien (1-2), A O’Connor (0-2), N O’Farrell (0-1), C O’Meara (0-1); B O’Connor (0-1).

16 October 2019 Round 1	Christian Brothers College	3-17 - 1-13	St Francis College	Páirc Liam Mhic Cárthaigh
		Report

6 November 2019 Round 2	Ardscoil Rís	0-25 - 0-09	St Francis College	Mallow GAA Complex
	C O'Neill 0-13, A O'Connor 0-6, S O'Brien 0-4, C O'Meara 0-1, B O'Connor 0-1.		A Connolly 0-5, P O'Riordan 0-1, A Sheehy 0-1, A Cantwell 0-1, C Dowd 0-1.

6 November 2019 Round 2	Christian Brothers College	2-14 - 0-11	Our Lady's Secondary School	Boherlahen Grounds
	J Cahalane 1-4, D McSweeney 0-4, T Downey 1-0, E Kirby 0-2, P Cummins 0-1, N Hartnett 0-1, R Cotter 0-1, E O'Leary 0-1.		D Kennedy 0-8, B Stapleton 0-1, P Kinnane 0-1, T Cahill 0-1.

20 November 2019 Round 3	Ardscoil Rís	0-13 - 0-13	Christian Brothers College	FitzGerald Park
	C O'Neill 0-11, A O'Connor 0-2.	Report	J Cahalane 0-9, R Cotter 0-2, N Hartnett 0-1, D Burke 0-1.

20 November 2019 Round 3	Our Lady's Secondary School	2-21 - 0-14	St Francis College	Canon Hayes Park
		Report

== Group D ==
=== Group D table ===
Knockout stage

Team	Matches				Score			Pts
Team	Pld	W	D	L	For	Against	Diff	Pts
Midleton CBS	2	2	0	0	35	24	11	4
St Joseph's SS	2	0	1	1	24	29	-5	1
Hamilton High School	2	0	1	1	28	34	-6	1

=== Group D results ===
16 October 2019 Round 1	Midleton CBS	0-20 - 1-11	Hamilton High School	Whitechurch Grounds
	R McCarthy (0-13, 0-12 frees, 0-1 sl), C Hickey and N Cahill (0-2 each), S Walsh, J Oke and J Mulcahy (0-1 each).	Report	M Hickey (0-7 frees), D O’Shea (1-2), C O’Donovan and C Taheny (0-1 each).

6 November 2019 Round 2	Midleton CBS	2-09 - 0-10	St Joseph's Secondary School	Cappamore Grounds
	R McCarthy 1-6, J McGann 1-0, S Walsh 0-2, J Mulcahy 0-1.		D Keogh 0-6, S Withycombe 0-1, J O'Gorman 0-1, C Murphy 0-1, A Conheady 0-1.

20 November 2019 Round 3	St Joseph's Secondary School	1-11 - 0-14	Hamilton High School	Mallow GAA Complex
	D Keogh (0-11, 11f), S Withycombe (0-3).	Report	M Hickey (1-7, 7f), E Kenneally (0-2), D O’Donovan (0-1), C O’Donovan (0-1)

== Knockout stage ==
=== Quarter-finals ===
8 January 2020 Quarter-final	Christian Brothers College, Cork	1-13 - 1-12	St Colman's College	Felix Sarsfield Memorial Park
	J Cahalane (0-9)(0-4 frees, 0-2 65s); D Burke (1-0), R Cotter (0-3); E Kirby (0-1).	Report	D Flynn (0-7)(0-3 frees, 0-3 65s); B Nodwell (1-0); D Roche (0-2); D O’Leary, D Daly, J Carr (0-1 each)

8 January 2020 Quarter-final	Midleton CBS	2-17 - 2-08	De La Salle College Waterford	Fraher Field
	R McCarthy (0-7, 0-4 frees, 0-1 65), J McGann (1-1), N Cahill (1-0), C Hickey (0-3), S Quirke, S Walsh and I Walsh (0-2 each).	Report	R Halloran (1-3, 0-3 frees), T Gallagher (1-1, 0-1 free), P Fitzgerald (0-3, 0-1 free), J Foley (0-1).

8 January 2020 Quarter-final	St Flannan's College	3-17 - 0-16	St Joseph's Secondary School	Cusack Park
	D Cahill (2-4), C Hegarty (1-3), A Brohan (0-4f), K O’Connor (0-3), P Power (0-1), C Galvin (0-1), D Nagle (0-1).	Report	D Keogh (0-10, 8f), C Murphy (0-2), A Conheady (0-2), S Withycombe (0-1), O Clune (0-1).

8 January 2020 Quarter-final	Thurles CBS	0-19 - 1-17	Our Lady's Secondary School	The Ragg
	D Ryan( 0-9,8fs), M Hackett(0-3), E Purcell(0-2), F Hanafin, P Creedon, J Leamy, J Morrissey, S Ferncombe(0-1 each);	Report	J Devaney (1-4,0-4fs), K Maher (0-3,3fs) E Ryan(0-3), K Ryan, C McCormack(0-2 each), T Cahill, J Campion, J Corcoran(0-1 each);

=== Semi-finals ===
25 January 2020 Semi-final	Christian Brothers College, Cork	2-11 - 0-16	Midleton CBS	Páirc Uí Rinn
	J Cahalane (1-8, 0-4 frees, 0-1 65), D Burke (1-0), R Cotter (0-2), E Kirby (0-1).	Report	S Walsh (0-5, 0-4 frees), C Hickey and N Cahill (0-3 each), J Mulcahy and J McGann (0-2 each), J Millerick (0-1).

25 January 2020 Semi-final	St Flannan's College	0-18 - 1-13	Our Lady's Secondary School	MacDonagh Park
	C Galvin 0-6 (0-4f); S Casey 0-3; A Brohan 0-5 (0-2f); O O’Donnell, K O’Connor, D Cahill and P Power 0-1 each.	Report	J Devanney 1-6 (0-6f); K Maher 0-3 (0-2f, 0-1 65’); J Campion 0-2; T Cahill 0-2.

=== Final ===
1 March 2020 Final	St Flannan's College	1-15 - 1-12	Christian Brothers College, Cork	Mallow GAA Complex
	C Galvin (0-5, 0-4 frees), K O’Connor (0-4), D Cahill (1-0), C Hegarty and O O’Donnell (0-2 each), T Butler and P Power (0-1 each),	Report	J Cahalane (1-9, 1-0 pen, 0-8 frees), R Cotter (0-2), E Kirby (0-1).	Referee: J O'Halloran (Limerick)
