= Clare Abbey =

Irish Augustinian abbey

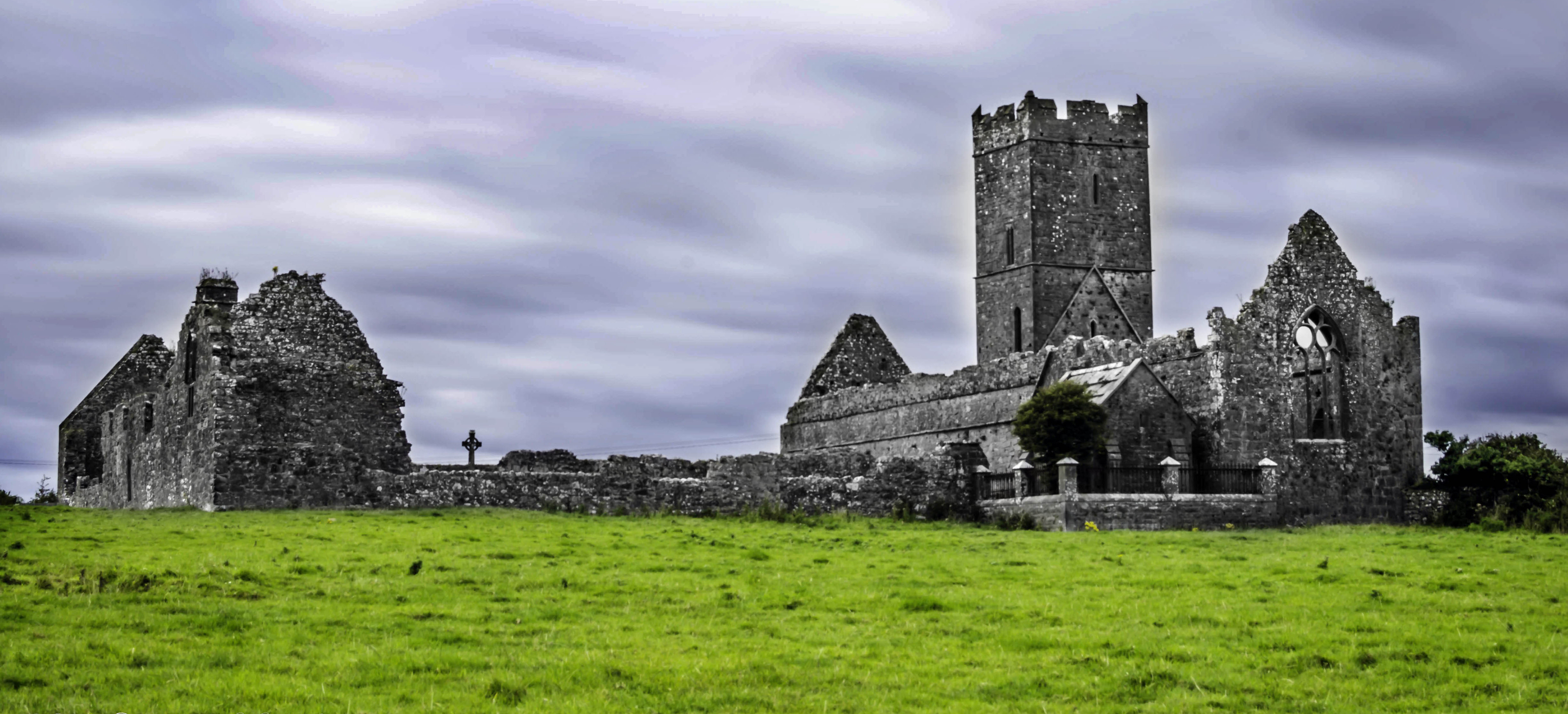
- Clare Abbey ruins, 2015

- Location within Ireland
- 52°49′42″N 8°58′6″W
- Location: Clarecastle, County Clare, Ireland

History
- Built: 1189

National monument of Ireland
- Reference no.: 197

Clare Abbey, also known as Clareabbey, is a ruined Augustinian monastery located near the Town of Ennis, along the banks of the Fergus River, and about a mile north of Clarecastle in County Clare, Ireland. The Abbey, founded in 1189, was the largest and most important of the Augustinian monasteries in County Clare.

== History ==
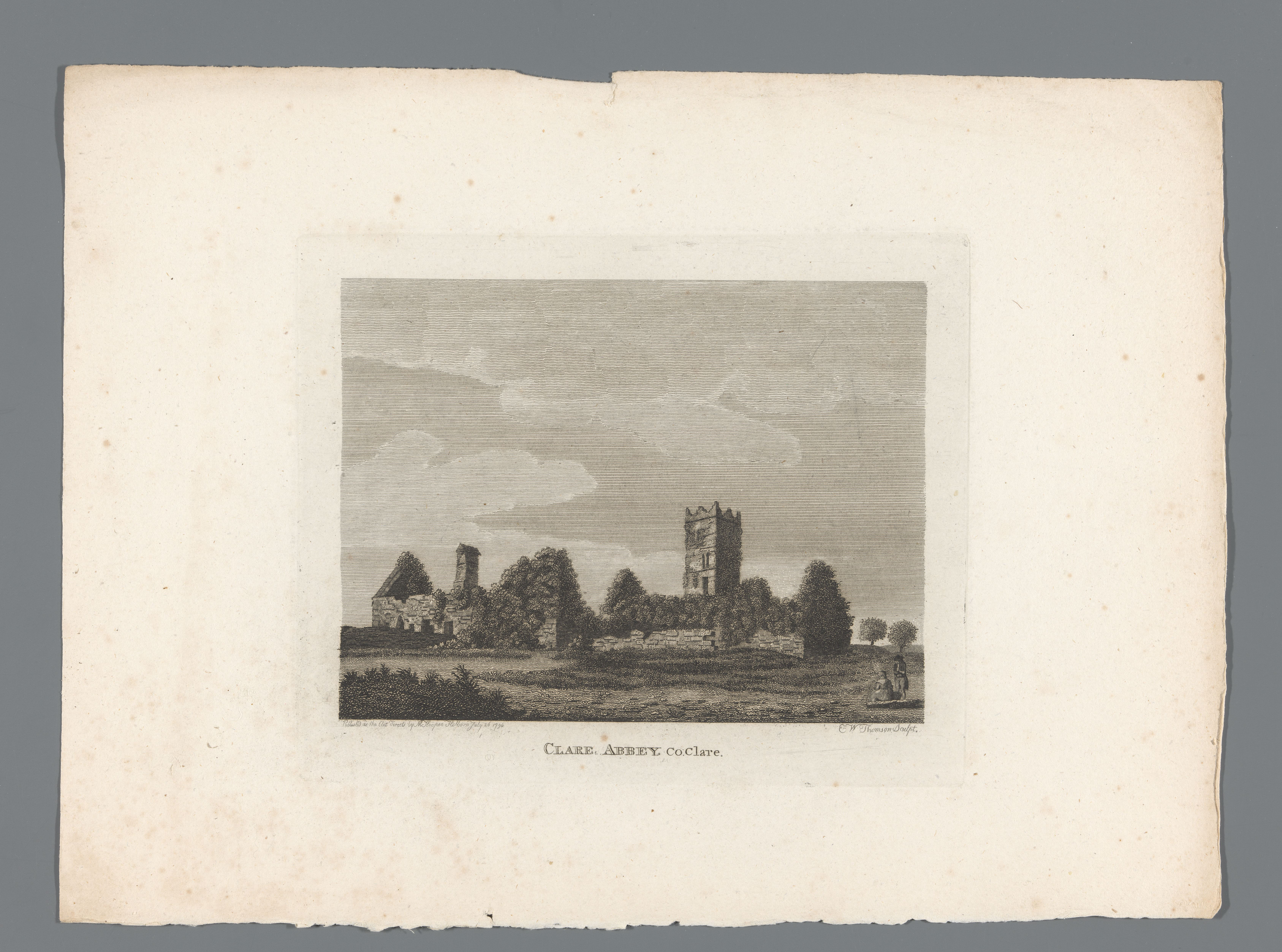
View of Clare Abbey (The antiquities of Ireland, 1795. S. Hooper)

Clare Abbey, originally called the "Abbey of St. Peter and St. Paul at Kilmony", was founded in 1189, under the sponsorship of Domnall Mór Ua Briain (Donald O'Brien), the king of Thomond. The Abbey, granted to an order of Augustinian Canons, was the largest and most important of the Augustinian monasteries in County Clare. The other Augustinian monasteries are: the Canon Island Abbey, the Inchicronan Priory, Killone Abbey (nunnery) and the Abbey at Kilshanny.

The Canons, also known as "Canons Regular", were an order of priests from Italy who followed the rule of St. Augustine. Their primary focus was parish work and "the care of souls". They lived simply, much like their parishioners. The Canons adapted easily to Irish medieval life, as it was very similar to their monastic lives back in Italy. The number of Canon orders continued to grow after the twelfth century. By the thirteenth century, they were the largest order in Ireland.

The name, Kimony, mentioned in early medieval documents, ("the church on the bog"), suggests that Clare Abbey was built on the site of an earlier church. The only remains of an older structure are possibly the bullaun in a block of granite and a stone carving over one of the abbey's windows. The monastery was built on a strip of land extending out in the Fergus river flood plain. Archaeologist, Thomas Johnson Westropp in 1900, describes the exposed and less than ideal siting of the abbey as being located in a grassland area, surrounded by marshy land prone to flooding by the River Fergus. He suggested that the site was chosen because it was a sacred site, another indication of an earlier church on in the area.

In 1278, Clare Abbey was the site of a legendary battle in the civil war between Toirdhealbhach Mór Ó Briain and Thomas de Clare. Donallbeg O'Brien ambushed and massacred Mahon O'Brien and his followers, billeted temporarily at the abbey, as they were making a hasty retreat. The bloody aftermath was described in the medieval chronicle, Caithréim Thoirdhealbhaigh (Wars of Torlough):

'The rout of the Abbey on Mahon O'Brien' became a proverb in the mouths of clan Torlagh. Unfortunately the matter did not end in honorable battle, but left a stain on Donallbeg's bravery and his followers. They captured many of the 'soldiers, fair-haired women, little boys, servants, kerne, horseboys, and herdsmen, making of them one universal litter of slaughter, butchering both prisoners and cattle in the bog of Moonshade, between Furroor and Dysert'.

— Westropp (1900)

In the thirteenth century, the two leading clans of County Clare, the O’Briens and the Macnamaras, changed their family burial places to Ennis Friary and Quin Abbey. Within a few years, most of the local chieftains had abandoned the Augustinian monasteries and the monastic buildings fell into disrepair." After the dissolution of the monasteries in 1543, the abbey and surrounding lands, now the civil parish of Clareabbey, were given to the Barons of Ibrackan by King Henry VIII of England. The monks appeared to have continued to live in the abbey until around 1650.

== Description ==
Clare Abbey is located on the west bank of the Fergus river, in County Clare, Ireland, and a mile south of the town of Ennis. The abbey remains today consist of a church with a belfry, and several domestic buildings, south and east of the church, and surrounding a cloister. Clare Abbey is unusual for an Augustinian monastery because it has no west range. The single-aisled church, which consists of a long nave and chancel is separated by a tower, and dates to the late twelfth century. The other buildings were constructed in the fifteenth century. The church was originally 39 metres long and about 9.5 metres wide. Important architectural features are three fifteenth-century traceried windows.

The church was originally 128 feet (39 m) by 31 feet (9.4 m). The interior was later divided into a nave and chancel by the belfry tower. The west window had collapsed by 1680.

When Westropp visited the site in 1886, he noted that the belfry had no staircase and he viewed a large tomb, with no inscription, lying in the north recess under the tower. He mentioned low and badly proportioned battlements of the tower, and also described that many loose stones that were visible in the buildings in the late 1800s were reset and repaired in 1898 and 1899. He also described a well-preserved east window, tower and domestic buildings and one incised post-Norman cross. The oldest legible tombs in 1886 were from the seventeenth century.

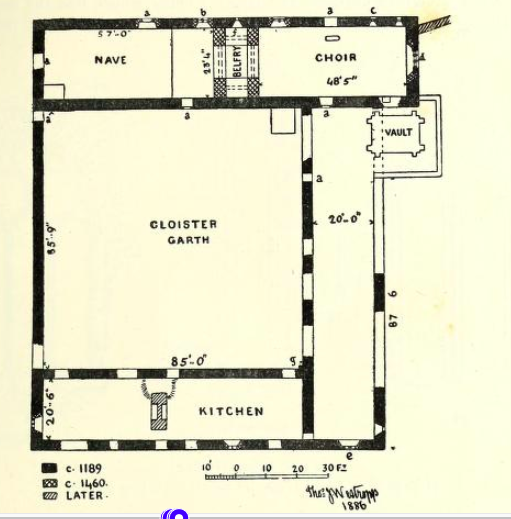
Clare Abbey, 1886

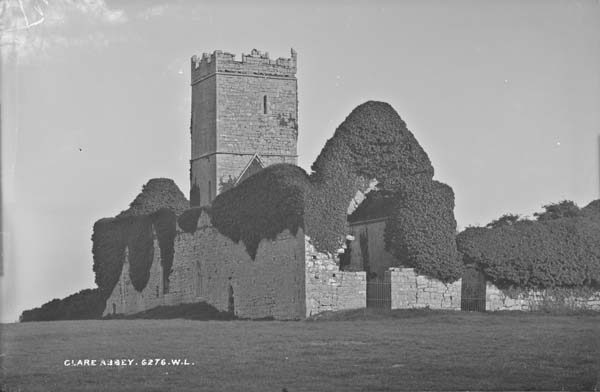
Clare Abbey, near 1900

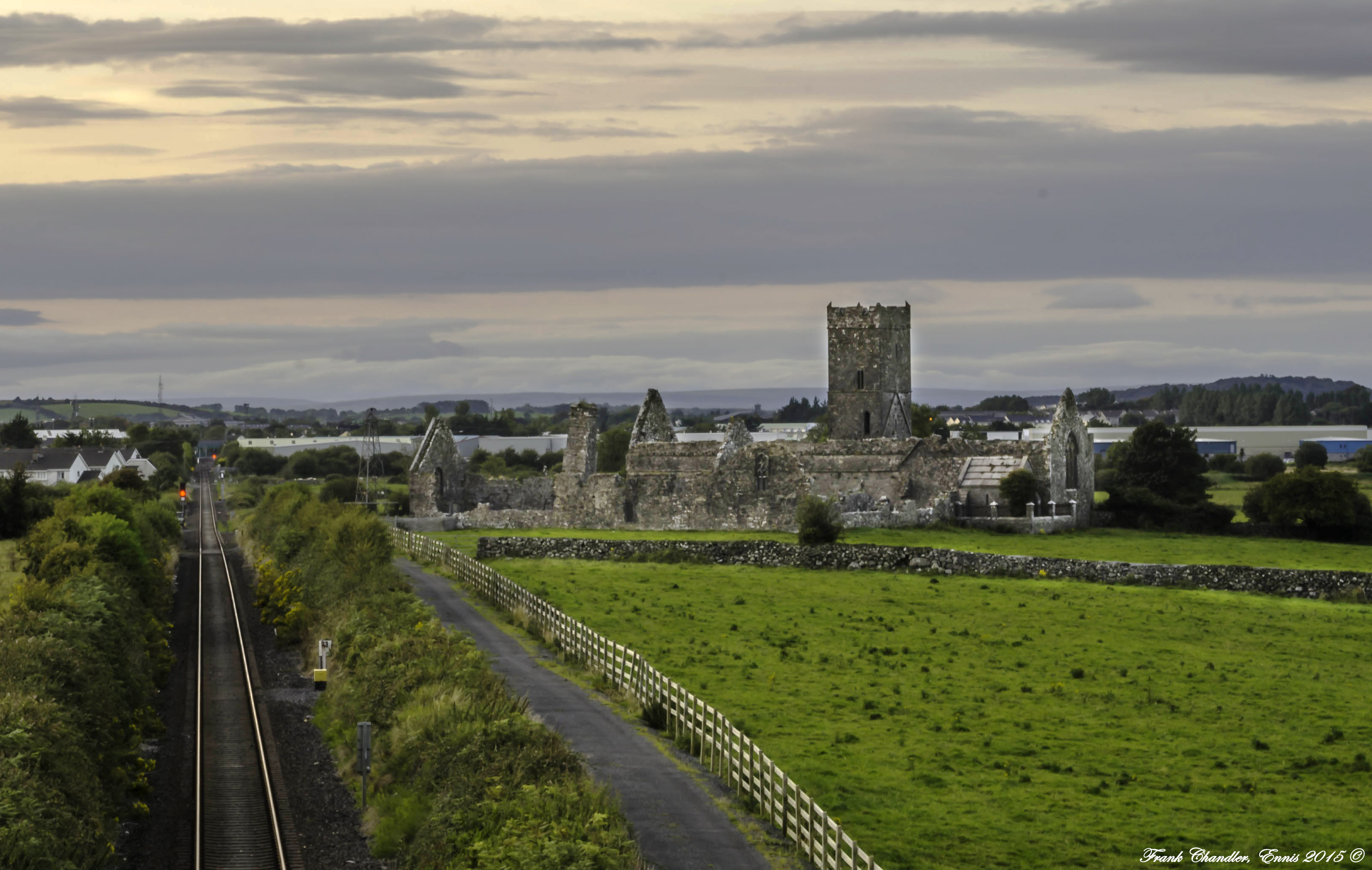
Clare Abbey far view, 2015

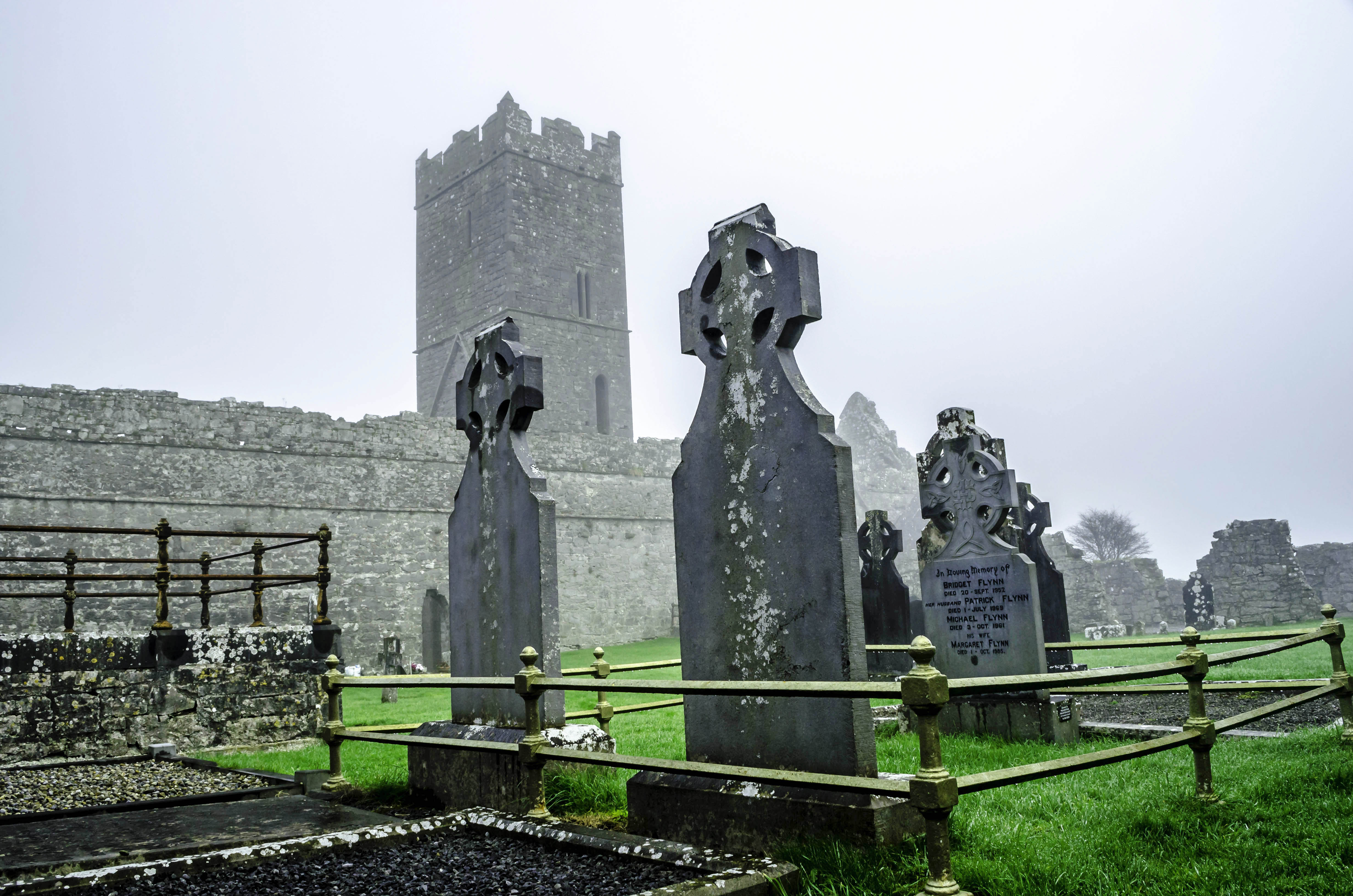
Clare Abbey tombs, 2014
