= Killone Abbey =

Ruined abbey in County Clare, Ireland

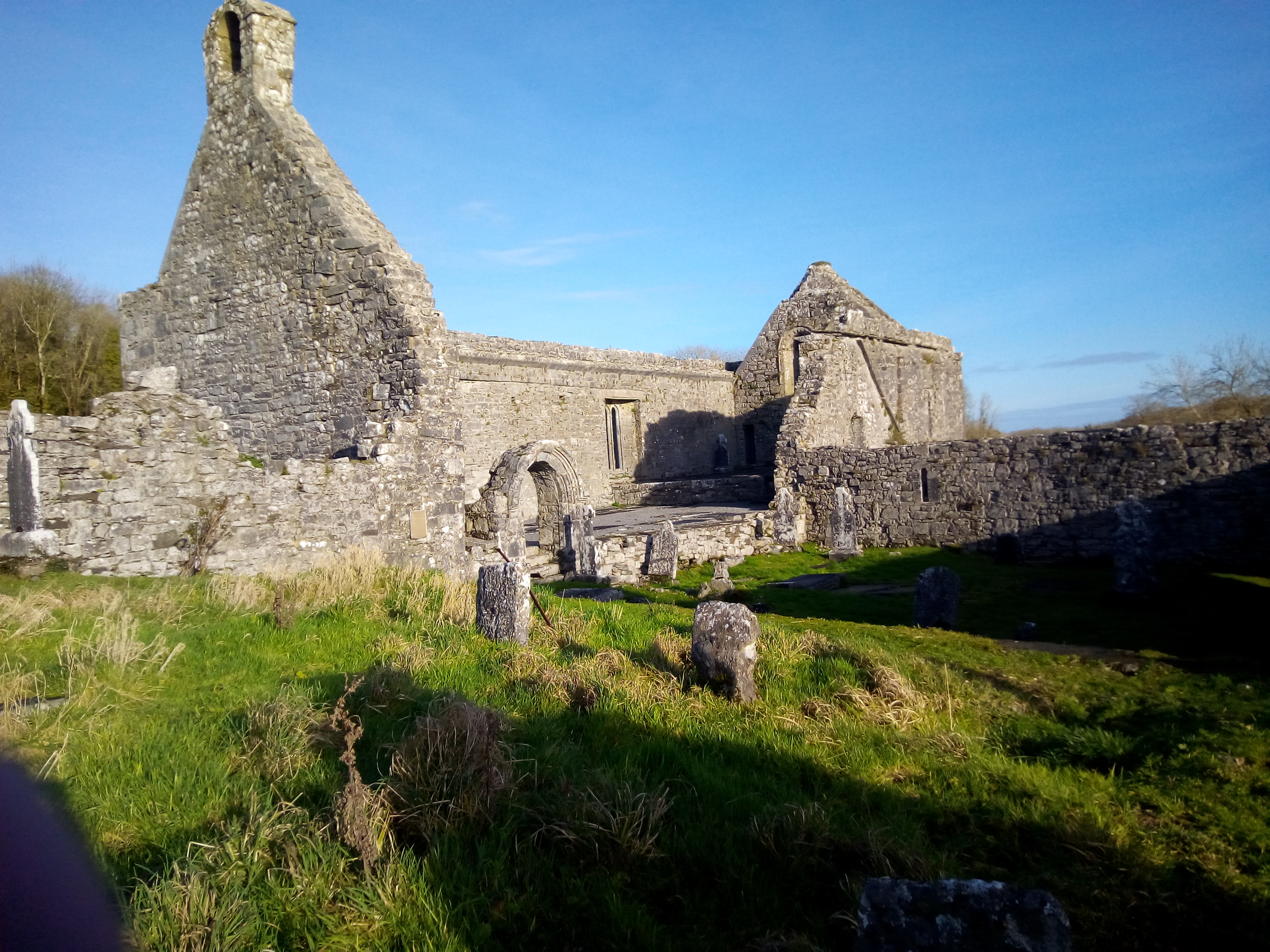

- Location within Ireland

Religion
- Affiliation: Augustinian Pre-Reformation Catholic

Location
- Interactive map of Killone Abbey
- Coordinates: 52°48′22.32″N 9°0′15.62″W

Architecture
- Groundbreaking: founded c.1189
- Materials: sandstone

Killone Abbey (Irish: Mainistir Chill Eoin) is a former nunnery located on the grounds of Newhall Estate in County Clare, Ireland.

== History ==
The abbey was founded in 1190 by Domnall Mór Ua Briain, King of Thomond and Munster. It was a prominent house of Canonesses Regular, a sisterhood of the order of Saint Augustin, and was one of a number of female monastic institutions in Gaelic Ireland.

It became associated with the O'Brien dynasty, one of the main Gaelic noble families in medieval Ireland, and several of its abbesses were drawn from their ranks. Among them was Slaney O'Brien (d. 1260), the daughter of Carbreagh, King of Thomond, who renounced her royal status and worldly possessions to take up the role of abbess.

The last abbess, Honora O'Brien, daughter of Murrough O'Brien, the 1st Earl of Thomond, played a significant role in the abbey's later history. Following the suppression of monastic houses in 1540, she married Sir Roger O'Shaughnessy and became heiress to Newhall and Killone. Their marriage, which required papal dispensation, occurred after the birth of their three eldest children.

By 1617, the abbey was recorded as being in ruins. The ruins are located on lands within the grounds of Newhall House and Estate. The ruins include substantial portions of the abbey church and a crypt. A narrow stone stairway, situated between the altar and the east window, leads to a ledge atop the south wall of the church, which overlooks the surrounding grounds.

== Saint John's Holy Well ==
Also located on the grounds of Newhall Estate is the Holy Well of Saint John the Baptist. Known as Tobar Eoin in Irish, the well's origins date to pre-Christian times. According to local folklore, the well is believed to have healing properties and has served as a place of pilgrimage for centuries. It features remnants of historical stone structures and a natural spring. The well is adorned with inscriptions partially dating back to 1600. Lord Walter Fitzgerald (the fourth son of Charles, Duke of Leinster) visited the site in 1899 and documented its history in Inscriptions at St. John's Well, Killone Abbey, County Clare for the Royal Society of Antiquaries of Ireland. The site is still used for religious services and an annual outdoor Mass is held at the well in June.

== Access ==
The abbey and graveyard is privately owned, part of Newhall Estate, owned by the Commane family. The abbey site is protected under the National Monuments Acts, with guardianship vested in the Office of Public Works. As it is private land, access is available with the owner's permission. Killone Abbey is linked to Clare Abbey by the "Pilgrim's Path", a footpath through Ballybeg forest.

== Gallery ==
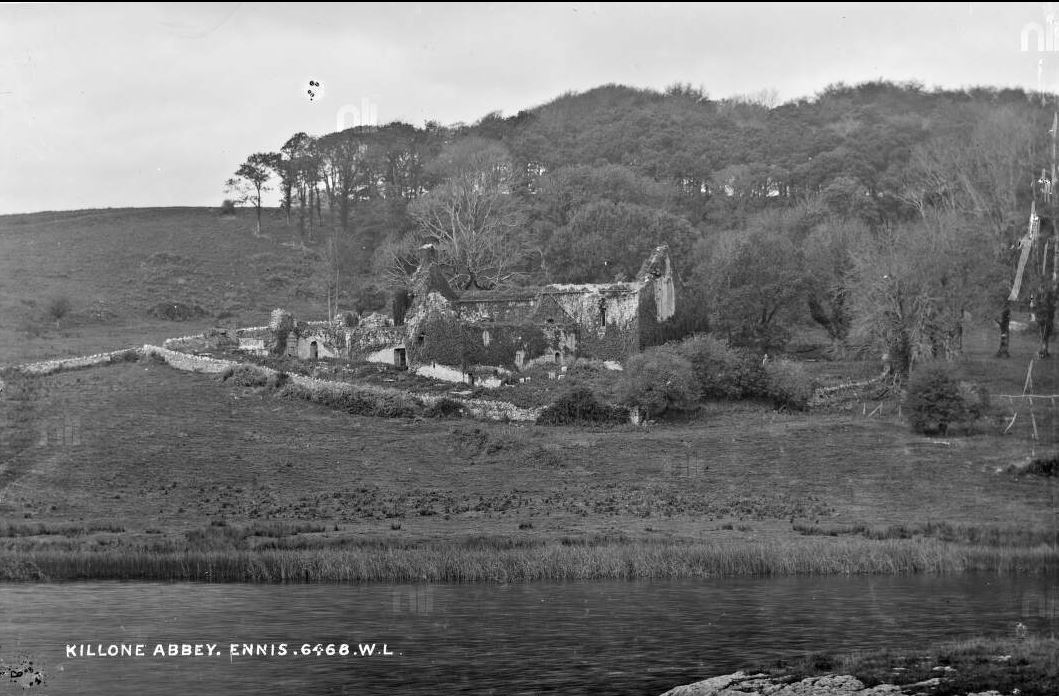
Killone Abbey 1890 Lawrence Collection National Library of Ireland

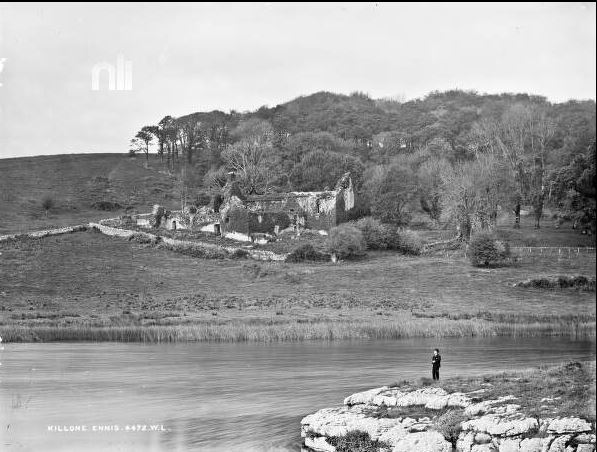
Killone Abbey 1890 Lawrence Collection

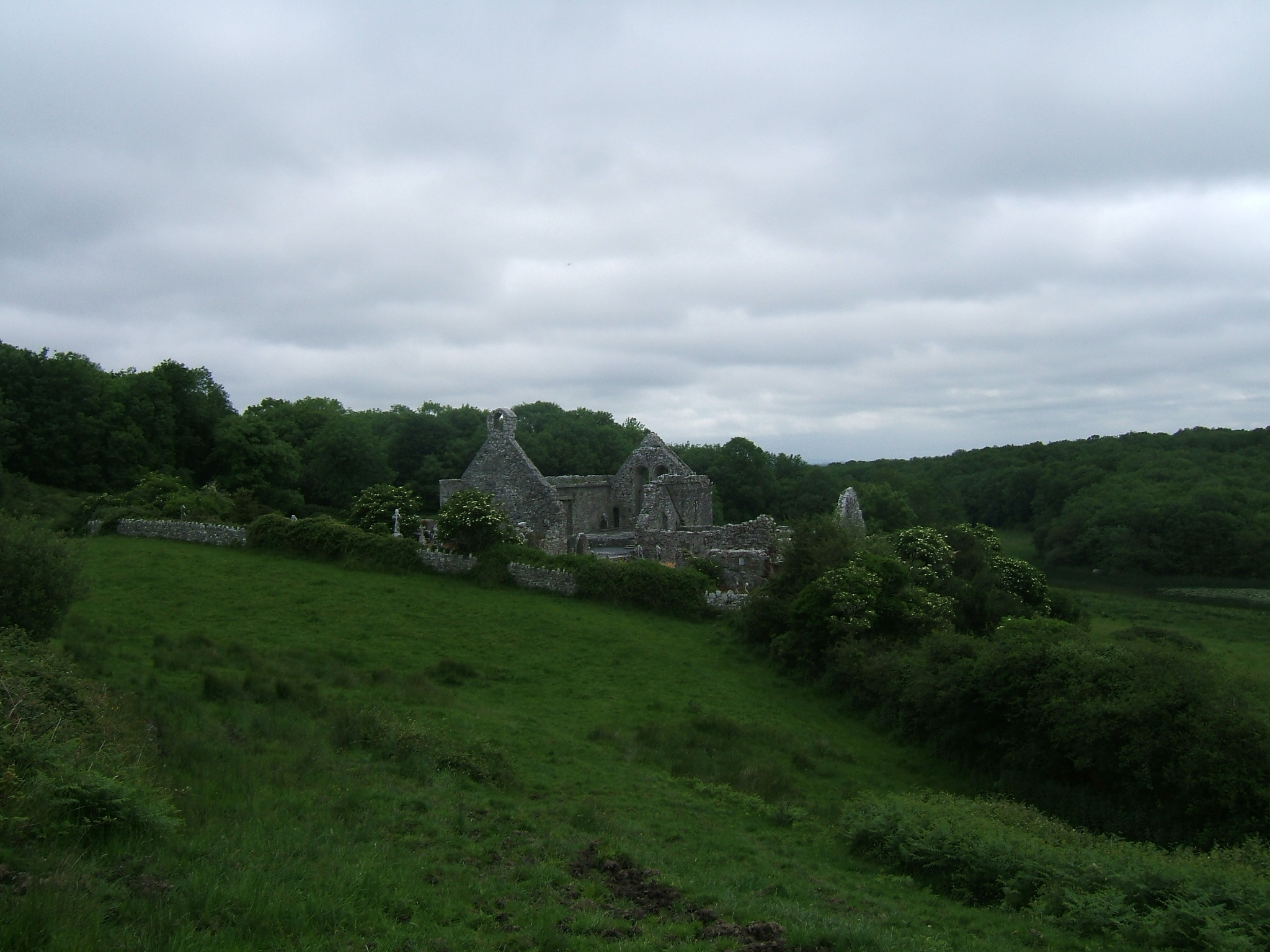
Killone Abbey

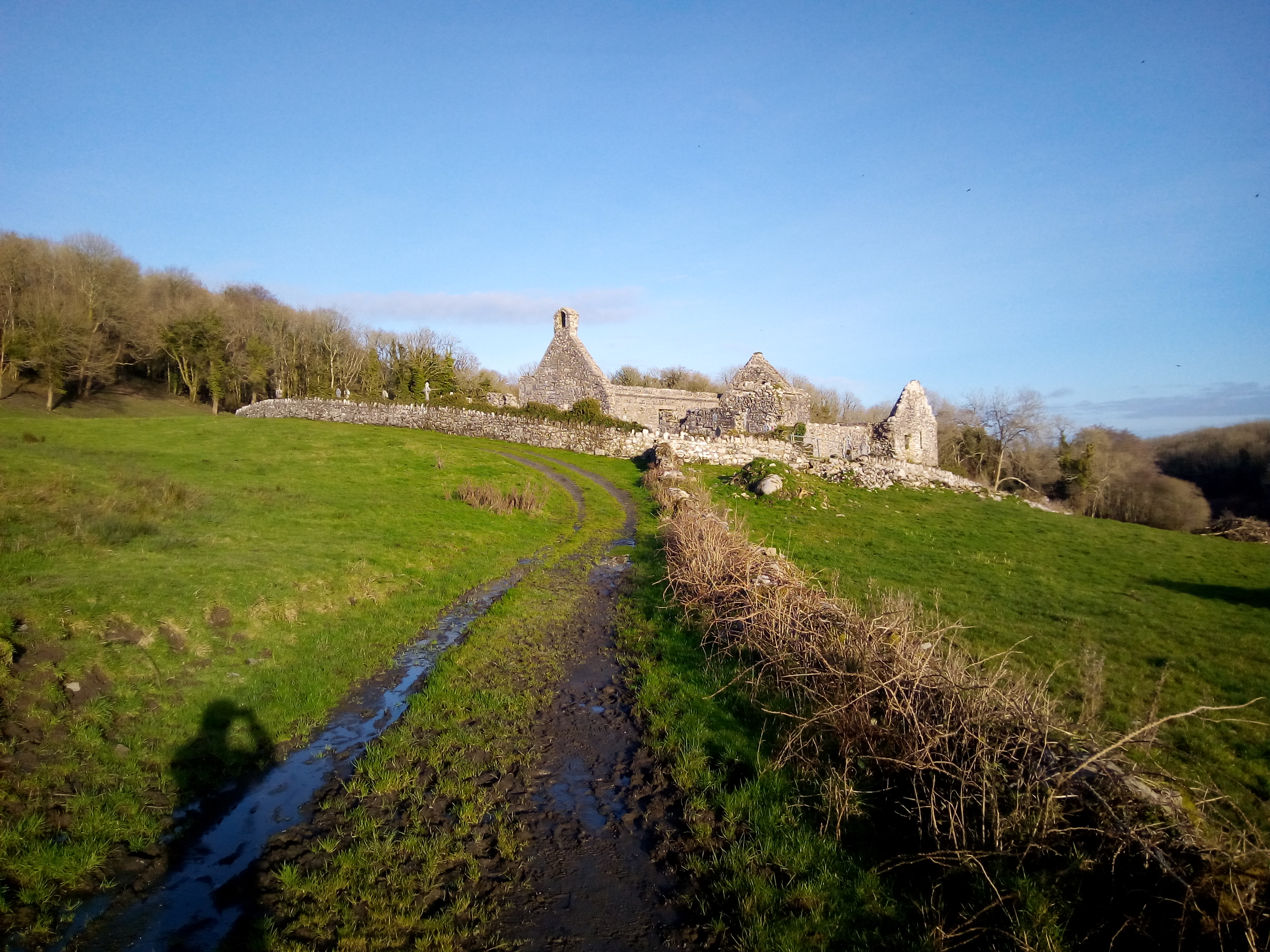
Killone Abbey Graveyard Ennis

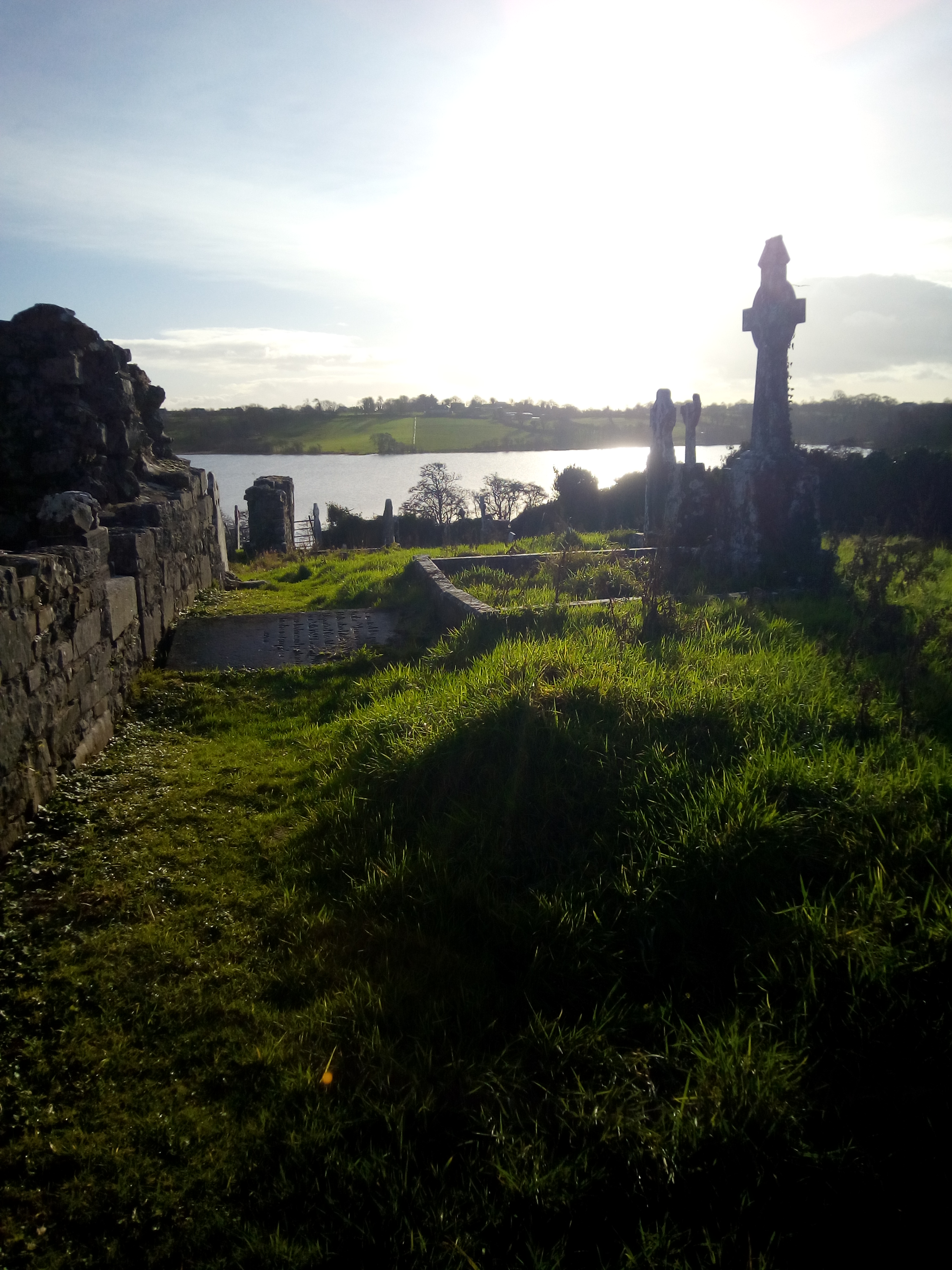
Killone Abbey Graveyard Ennis

== See also ==
- List of abbeys and priories in Ireland (County Clare)
