= Clarecastle =

Village in County Clare, Ireland

Clarecastle Clár Átha an da Choradh / Droichead an Clár
- Village
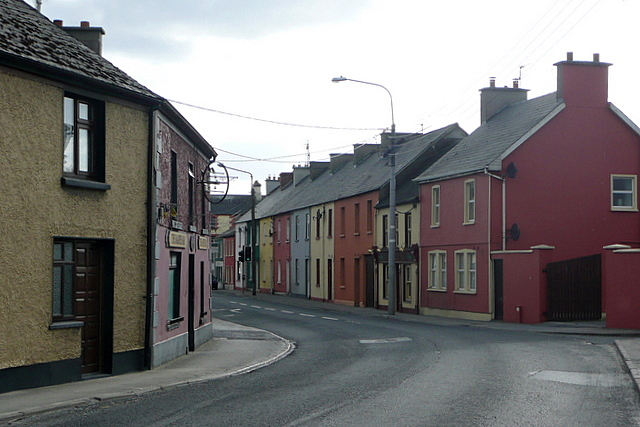
- Main Street

- Location in Ireland
- Coordinates: 52°49′00″N 8°58′00″W
- Country: Ireland
- Province: Munster
- County: County Clare
- Time zone: UTC+0 (WET)
  - Summer (DST): UTC-1 (IST (WEST))
- Irish Grid Reference: R346742

Clarecastle (/kleɪrˈkæsəl/, clare-KASS-ul; An Clár or Irish: Droichead an Chláir, meaning 'Bridge of the Plain') is a village just south of Ennis in County Clare, Ireland.

== Name ==
The town is named after the Clare Castle, which stands on an island in the narrowest navigable part of the River Fergus. The Irish Clár, meaning a wooden board, is often used for a bridge. The name probably originated as Clár adar da choradh, which means "the bridge between two weirs". Another explanation of the name is that the de Clare family gave the castle its name, since they had acquired land in Kilkenny and Thomond that included the castle. In 1590 County Clare was named after the castle, which is in a strategic location.

Clarecastle (Clare Abbey) is a parish in the Roman Catholic Diocese of Killaloe. It is also known as Ballyea/Clarecastle. Clare Abbey and Killone Abbey are linked by a footpath, the Pilgrim's Road.

== History ==
Clarecastle was once home to a port servicing a variety of cargo, used for exports and the delivery of items into the nearby town of Ennis, which could not be reached by navigation of the River Fergus.

== The Port of Clare ==
The Port of Clare consisted of the main quay of Clarecastle and an additional berthing frontage downstream towards the estuary. Clare was a busy port during its time, allowing safe navigation and berthing for vessels close to the town of Ennis. The quay structure is approximately 155 metres in length and was completed in 1845 under the supervision of civil engineer Thomas Rhodes, Principal Engineer to the Shannon Commissioners.

The quay is no longer used for cargo or large vessels, but is suitable for berthing of small craft and recreational use, with an annual community regatta being held in June. Navigation within the quay area for larger vessels is not available at all states of the tide, with the macro-tidal range resulting in almost dry conditions at low water springs. During the historical peak of commercial activity at the port, the complicated approaches to Clarecastle from the estuaries of the Shannon and Fergus, arising from issues such as limited depth for navigation exacerbated by the presence of estuarine intertidal mudflats and rhythmites, necessitated the use of maritime pilots and precluded very large vessels from accessing the quay. Navigation beyond Clarecastle towards Ennis is precluded by the presence of a barrage (dam) north of the quay, which serves to limit tidal influence upstream as part of a flood control strategy.

The sediment transport mechanisms in the estuary and lower Fergus are influenced by historical land reclamation works at the inter-tidal lands in the Fergus Estuary south of Clarecastle. The most ambitious effort was led by the Clare Slobland Reclamation Company (CSRC). The company aimed to reclaim approximately 579 hectares of slobland between Islandavanna and Islandmagrath by constructing embankments and seawalls, with Clarecastle serving as a key logistics hub for stone and rubble supply.

From 1885 to 1886, rubble was quarried locally and loaded at Clarecastle quay onto lighters, which transported over 900 cargoes of rubble and paving stone to the main reclamation site. Despite large-scale employment (often over 300 workers at a time) and significant financial investment, including loans advanced by the Board of Works, the works were repeatedly damaged by storms, with major breaches recorded in November 1884 and May 1886.

Although the embankments were eventually completed by 1887, the scheme collapsed financially soon after. By 1892 the reclaimed lands were sold for only £2,300, a fraction of the estimated £170,000 valuation made in 1882, and subsequent storm damage in 1896 re-flooded much of the area. A smaller scale scheme by the Fergus Reclamation Company reclaimed around 283 hectares in a more sheltered section of the estuary, and remains intact.

== Sports ==
The local GAA team is Clarecastle GAA. The club's colours are black and white and they are known as the Magpies.

== Notable people ==
The composer Gerald Barry was born in Clarecastle in 1952.

== Gallery ==
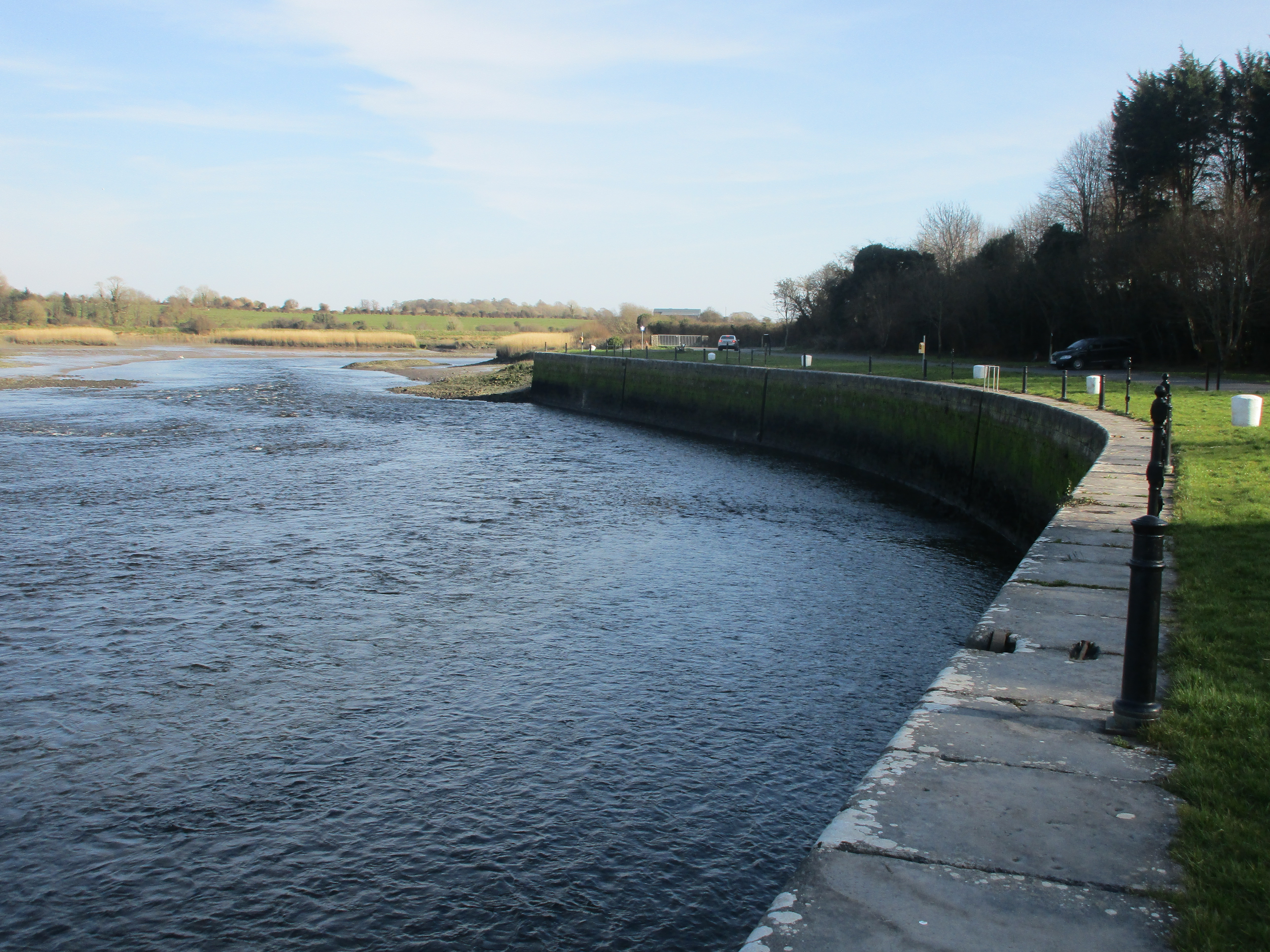
The quay was once a busy port, acting as port of Ennis

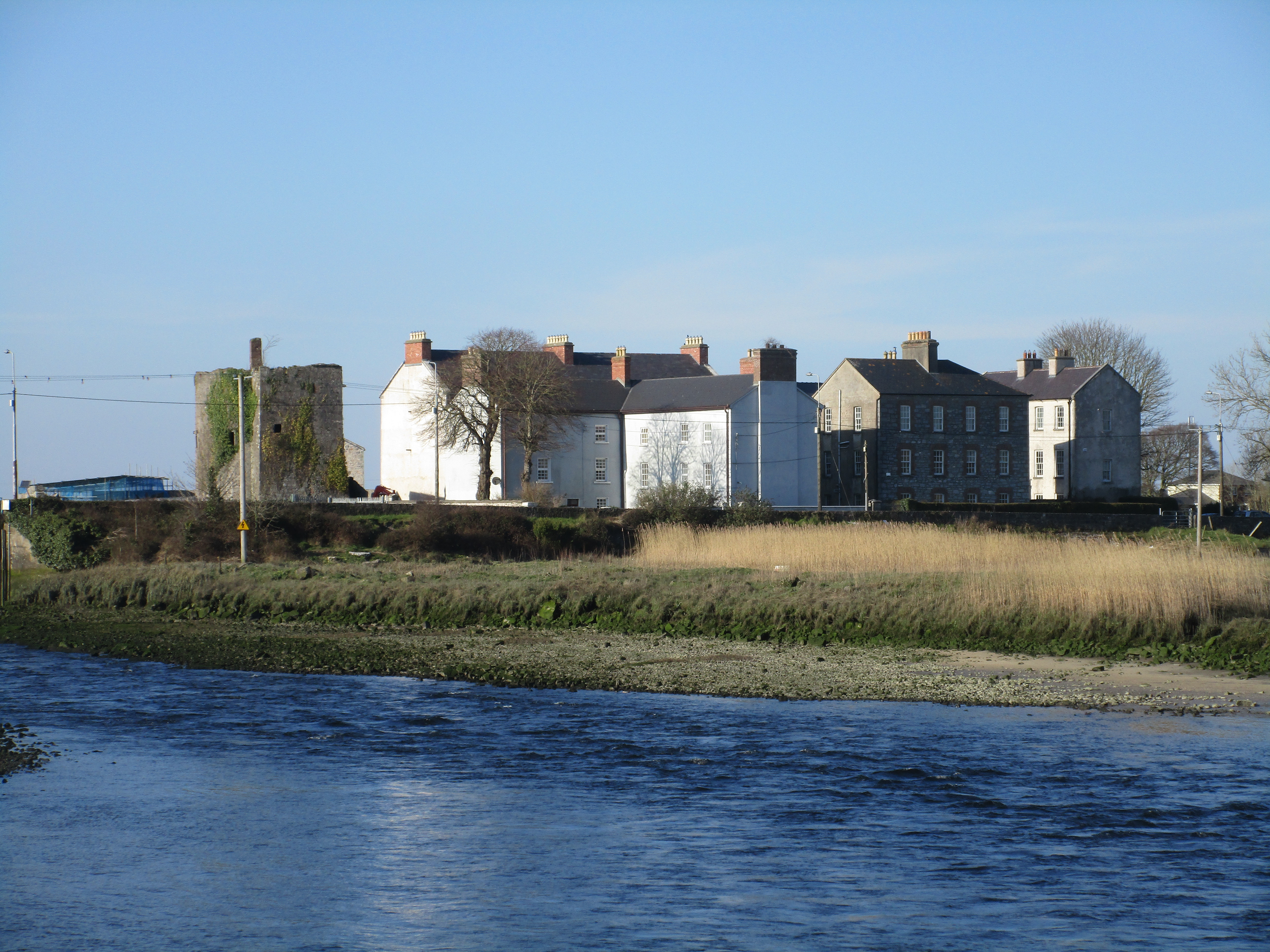
On the left the ruins of the castle itself, name-giver of the village. In the middle the former military barracks.

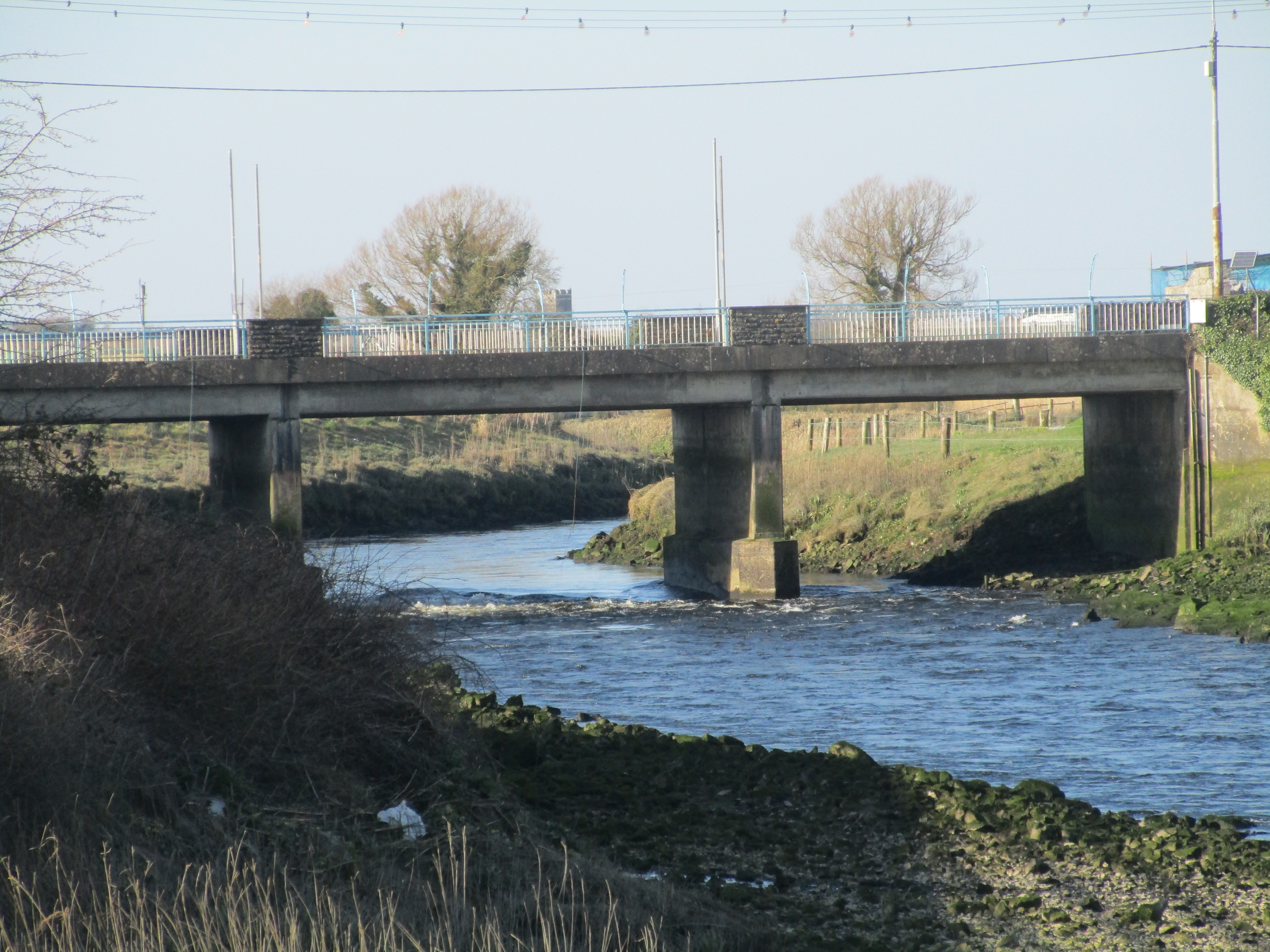
Built in the 1970s it replaced a five arch bridge to cope with the increasing traffic

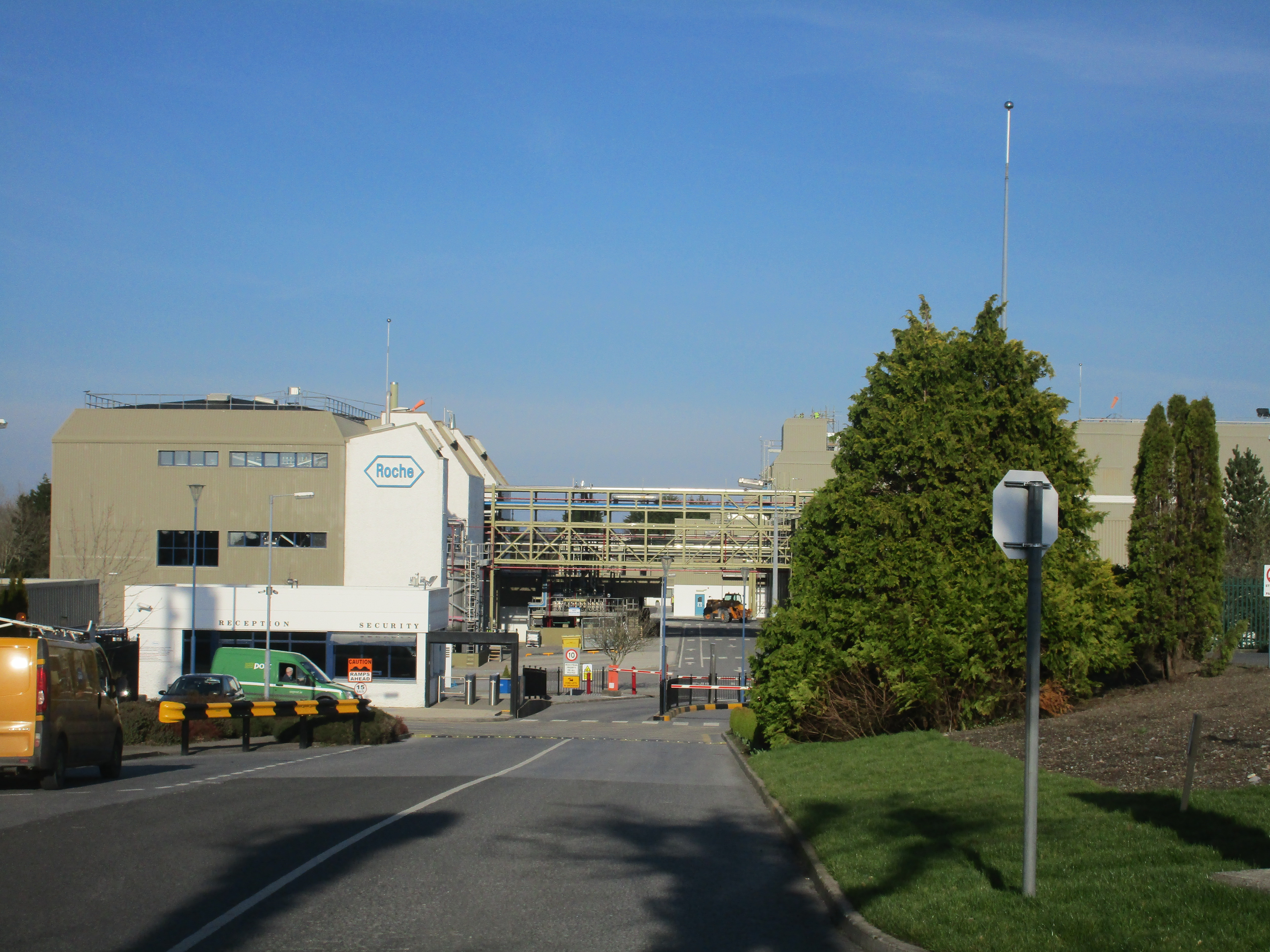
The factory of Roche used to be the main employer in Clarecastle

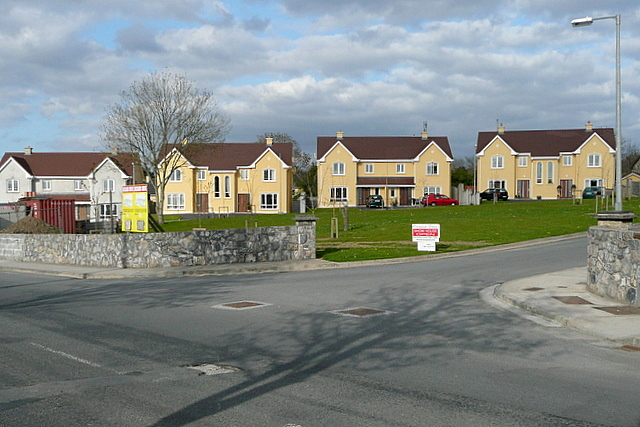
Housing estate off Hill View

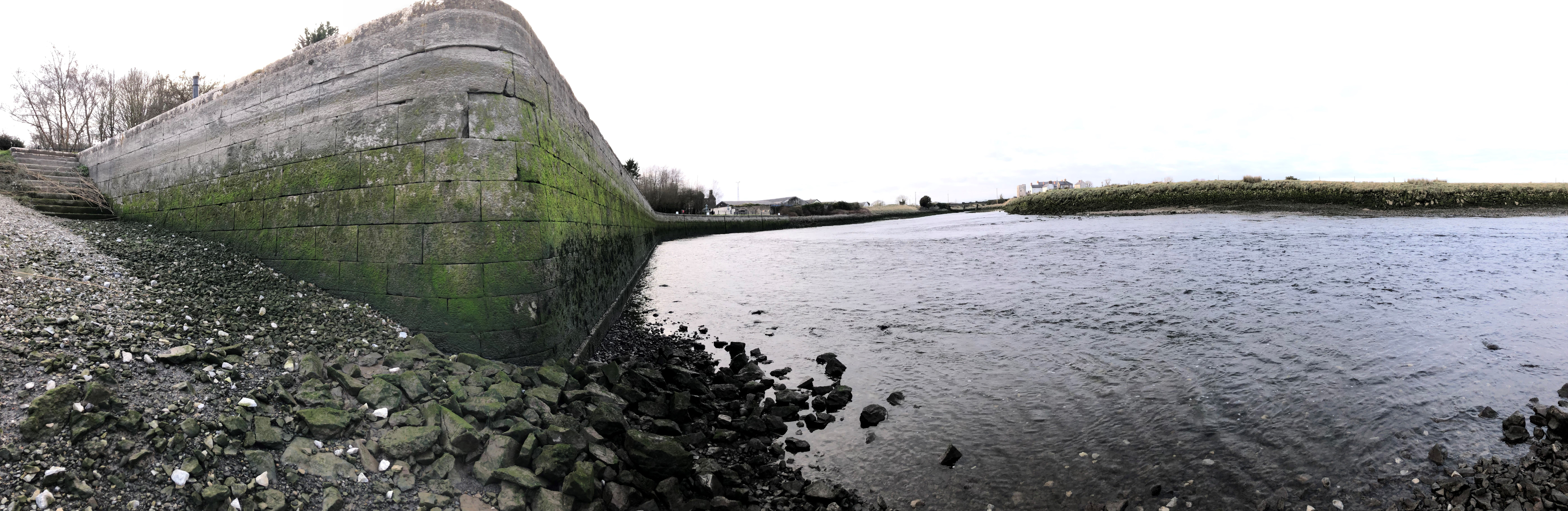
The quay wall at Clarecastle at low water in 2019.

== See also ==
- List of abbeys and priories in County Clare
- List of towns and villages in Ireland
