= Seán Power (Clare hurler) =

Irish hurler

Personal information
- Native name: Seán de Paor (Irish)
- Born: 28 October 1972 (age 54) Shannon, County Clare, Ireland

Sport
- Sport: Hurling
- Position: Midfield
Club
- Years: Club
- Wolfe Tones na Sionna
Club titles
- Clare titles: 1
- Munster titles: 1
- All-Ireland Titles: 0
Inter-county
- Years: County
- 1993–1994: Clare
Inter-county titles
- Munster titles: 0
- All-Irelands: o
- NHL: 0
- All Stars: 0

Seán Power (born 28 October 1972) is an Irish retired hurler. At club level he played with Wolfe Tones na Sionna and at inter-county level with the Clare senior hurling team.

== Career ==
At club level, Power played at all levels with the Wolfe Tones na Sionna club. He was part of the club's under-14 team that beat Piltown to win the Féile na nGael competition in 1986. He later won Clare MAHC and U21AHC titles before progressing to the club's senior team.

Power won a Clare SHC medal in 1996 following a 1–11 to 0–08 win over Sixmilebridge in the final. He later added a Munster Club SHC medal to his collection before a 0–14 to 1–08 defeat by Athenry in the 1997 All-Ireland club final.

At inter-county level, Power first appeared for Clare as a member of the minor team. He won a Munster MHC medal before later losing to Offaly in the 1989 All-Ireland MHC final. He later progressed to the under-21 team. Power was also part of the Clare junior team, and won an All-Ireland JHC medal after a defeat of Kilkenny in the 1993 All-Ireland junior final. He also made a number of appearances for the senior team in the National Hurling League.

== Honours ==
Wolfe Tones na Sionna

- Munster Senior Club Hurling Championship: 1996
- Clare Senior Hurling Championship: 1996
- Clare Minor A Hurling Championship: 1988
- Féile na nGael: 1986

Clare

- All-Ireland Junior Hurling Championship: 1993
- Munster Junior Hurling Championship: 1993
- Munster Minor Hurling Championship: 1989
