= Ger Moroney =

Irish hurler (born 1971)

Personal information
- Native name: Gearóid Ó Maolruanaidh (Irish)
- Born: 24 July 1971 (age 55) O'Callaghan's Mills, County Clare, Ireland
- Occupation: Program manager

Sport
- Sport: Hurling
- Position: Full-back
Club
- Years: Club
- O'Callaghan's Mills
Club titles
- Clare titles: 0
College
- Years: College
- 1989–1993: University of Limerick
College titles
- Fitzgibbon titles: 0
Inter-county
- Years: County
- 1990–1996: Clare
Inter-county titles
- Munster titles: 1
- All-Irelands: 1
- NHL: 0
- All Stars: 0

Ger Moroney (born 24 July 1971) is an Irish retired hurler. At club level he played with O'Callaghan's Mills and at inter-county level with the Clare senior hurling team.

== Career ==
Moroney played hurling as a student at St Flannan's College in Ennis. He lined out in all grades and was part of the college's senior team that won the Dr Harty Cup title in 1989 after beating Shannon Comprehensive School in an all-Clare final. Moroney also lined out in the subsequent one-point All-Ireland final defeat by St Kieran's College. He later played with University of Limerick in the Fitzgibbon Cup.

At club level, Moroney played with O'Callaghan's Mills. He was at centre-back for the club's 3–08 to 2–06 defeat by Sixmilebridge in the Clare SHC final in 1993.

At inter-county level, Moroney first appeared for Clare as a member of the minor team. He won a Munster MHC medal before losing to Offaly in the 1989 All-Ireland MHC final. He later progressed to the under-21 team, with his last game in that grade being the 1992 Munster under-21 HC final defeat by Waterford.

Moroney later progressed to the Clare junior team as well as the senior team. He was a substitute on the Clare team that bridged a 63-year gap to win the Munster SHC title in 1995. Moroney later claimed an All-Ireland SHC medal as a substitute after Clare beat Offaly to claim the title for the first time in 81 years.

== Honours ==
St Flannan's College

- Dr Harty Cup: 1989
- Dean Ryan Cup: 1988

Clare

- All-Ireland Senior Hurling Championship: 1995
- Munster Senior Hurling Championship: 1995
- Munster Minor Hurling Championship: 1989
