= Pat Markham =

Irish hurler

Personal information
- Native name: Pádraig Ó Marcacháim (Irish)
- Born: 23 August 1971 (age 55) Quin, County Clare, Ireland

Sport
- Sport: Hurling
- Position: Right wing-back
Club
- Years: Club
- Clooney-Quin
Club titles
- Clare titles: 0
Inter-county
- Years: County
- 1990–1995: Clare
Inter-county titles
- Munster titles: 0
- All-Irelands: 0
- NHL: 0
- All Stars: 0

Patrick Markham (born 23 August 1971) is an Irish retired hurler. At club level he played with Clooney-Quin and at inter-county level with the Clare senior hurling team.

== Career ==
Markham played hurling as a student at St Flannan's College in Ennis and lined out in all grades during his time there. After winning a Dean Ryan Cup medal in 1988, he was part of the college's senior team that won the Dr Harty Cup title in 1989 after beating St Patrick's Comprehensive School in an all-Clare final. Markham also lined out in the subsequent one-point All-Ireland final defeat by St Kieran's College.

At club level, Markham played at all levels with Clooney-Quin. He won a Clare IHC medal in 2006, following the club's 0–16 to 0–14 defeat of Killanena in the final. Markham later claimed a Munster Club IHC medal after a 0–14 to 1–08 win over Bishopstown.

At inter-county level, Markham first appeared for Clare as a member of the minor team. He won a Munster MHC medal before later losing to Offaly in the 1989 All-Ireland MHC final. He later progressed to the under-21 team. Markham made a number of appearances for the senior team between 1990 and 1995.

== Honours ==
St Flannan's College

- Dr Harty Cup: 1989
- Dean Ryan Cup: 1988

Clooney-Quin

- Munster Intermediate Club Hurling Championship: 2006
- Clare Intermediate Hurling Championship: 2006

Clare

- Munster Minor Hurling Championship: 1989
