= John Hodgins =

Irish hurler

Personal information
- Native name: Seán Mac Hoisticín (Irish)
- Born: 27 August 1961 (age 65) Cork, Ireland
- Occupation: Design manager
- Height: 5 ft 9 in (175 cm)

Sport
- Sport: Hurling
- Position: Left corner-back
Club
- Years: Club
- 1979-1988: St Finbarr's
Club titles
- Cork titles: 5
- Munster titles: 1
- All-Ireland Titles: 0
College
- Years: College
- 1980-1984: Cork Regional Technical College
Inter-county*
Years	County	Apps (scores)
1983-1986	Cork	9 (0-00)
Inter-county titles
- Munster titles: 4
- All-Irelands: 2
- NHL: 0
- All Stars: 0
- *Inter County team apps and scores correct as of 22:37, 22 December 2014.

John Hodgins (born 27 August 1961) is an Irish former hurler who played as a left corner-back at senior level for the Cork county team.

Born in Cork, Hodgins first arrived on the inter-county scene at the age of sixteen when he first linked up with the Cork minor team, before later joining the under-21 side. He joined the senior panel during the 1983 championship. Hodgins subsequently became a regular member of the starting fifteen, and won one All-Ireland medal and three Munster medals.

At club level Hodgins is a five-time championship medallist with St Finbarr's.

Throughout his inter-county career, Hodgins made 9 championship appearances for Cork. His retirement came following the conclusion of the 1986 championship.

In retirement from playing Hodgins became involved in team management and coaching, Hodgins has been managing teams since he was 14 years of age. In 2011 he was appointed as a selector with the Cork under-21 team before later taking over as coach.

Hodgins is currently living in Rochestown, Cork with his wife Kay, daughter Karen and sons Sean and Hodge.

== Playing career ==
=== Club ===
Hodgins was just out of the minor grade when he became a regular in defence with the St Finbarr's senior hurling team in 1980. That year he lined out in his first championship decider. A narrow 1-9 to 2-4 defeat of northside rivals Glen Rovers gave Hodgins his first championship medal.

"The Barrs" retained their county title the following year, with Hodgins collecting a second consecutive championship medal as Glen Rovers were accounted for once again. St Finbarr's made it three-in-a-row in 1982, with Hodgins winning his third championship medal following a 2-17 to 3-9 defeat of Blackrock, in spite of a hat trick by veteran Ray Cummins.

Four-in-a-row proved beyond the Barr's, however, the team contested a sixth successive championship decider in 1984. A 1-15 to 2-4 defeat of Ballyhea gave Hodgins a fourth championship medal as well as the honour of lifting the Seán Óg Murphy Cup as captain of the team.

It was 1988 before St Finbarr's contested their next county decider. A 3-18 to 2-14 defeat of old rivals Glen Rovers gave Hodgins his fifth championship medal.

=== Minor and under-21 ===
Hodgins first came to prominence on the inter-county scene as a member of the Cork minor hurling team. He made his debut in the All-Ireland final in 1978 as Cork faced Kilkenny. "The Cats" were easily accounted for on a score line of 1-15 to 1-8, giving Hodgins his first All-Ireland medal.

In 1979 Hodgins was one of six players from the previous year who were still eligible for the minor grade. He picked up a Munster medal that year as Limerick were accounted for by 3-17 to 4-4, before later lining out in a second successive All-Ireland decider. Kilkenny provided the opposition once again, however, Cork were triumphant for the second successive year on a score line of 2-11 to 1-9. In his last game in the grade Hodgins collected a second All-Ireland medal.

Hodgins subsequently joined the Cork under-21 team. In 1982 he won a Munster medal following a 1-14 to 1-4 defeat of Limerick. Galway were the opponents in the subsequent All-Ireland decider on a day when both defences gave superb displays. Cork came from behind in the closing stages to win by a single point, scored from long range by Kevin Hennessy. It was yet another underage All-Ireland medal for Cunningham.

=== Senior ===
In 1983 Hodgins was a member of the extended panel of the Cork senior hurling team. He won a Munster medal as an unused substitute that year following Cork's 3-22 to 0-12 rout of Waterford.

Hodgins made his senior championship debut on 3 June 1984 in a 3-15 to 2-13 Munster semi-final defeat of Limerick, as Cork booked their place in their third successive Munster decider. Tipperary provided the opposition in what is regarded as one of the best provincial finals of all-time. With six minutes remaining Tipp held a four-point lead. After a John Fenton free reduced the deficit, a goal from substitute Tony O'Sullivan brought the sides level. A subsequent O'Sullivan point attempt was batted away by John Sheedy, however, Seánie O'Leary was on hand to send the sliotar to the net for the winning goal. Fenton added a pointed free and Cork had won an amazing game by 4-15 to 3-14, with Hodgins picking up a first winners' medal on the field of play. Cork subsequently faced Offaly in the centenary year All-Ireland decider at Semple Stadium on 2 September 1984. It was the first meeting of these two sides in one hundred years of Gaelic games. The game was a triumph for Cork, who won by 3-16 to 1-12 courtesy of second-half goals by Kevin Hennessy and two by Seánie O'Leary, giving Hodgins an All-Ireland medal.

In 1985 Hodgins added a second successive Munster title to his collection as Cork defeated Tipperary by 4-17 to 4-11 in the provincial decider once again.

Cork made it five-in-a-row in Munster in 1986 as they defeated Clare by 2-18 to 3-12 to take the provincial title. It was Hodgins's third Munster medal on the field of play. He lined out in the subsequent All-Ireland semi-final defeat of Antrim, however, he was dropped from the team for the subsequent All-Ireland decider with Galway. This brought Hodgins's inter-county career to an end.

== Coaching career ==
In 2011 Hodgins was appointed as a selector with the Cork under-21 team. He later took over the position of coach.

== Honours ==
=== Player ===
St Finbarr's

- Munster Senior Club Hurling Championship: 1980
- Cork Senior Hurling Championship: 1980, 1981, 1982, 1984 (c), 1988

Cork

- All-Ireland Senior Hurling Championship: 1984, 1986
- Munster Senior Hurling Championship: 1983, 1984, 1985, 1986
- All-Ireland Under-21 Hurling Championship: 1982
- Munster Under-21 Hurling Championship: 1982
- All-Ireland Minor Hurling Championship: 1978, 1979
- Munster Minor Hurling Championship: 1978, 1979

=== Management ===
St Finbarr's

- Cork Under-21 Hurling Championship: 1990, 1991, 1992, 1994

Wolfe Tones na Sionna

- Munster Senior Club Hurling Championship: 1996
- Clare Senior Hurling Championship: 1996
