= Francis Corey =

Irish hurler (born 1971)

Personal information
- Native name: Prionsias Ó Comhraí (Irish)
- Born: 8 April 1971 (age 55) Ennis, County Clare, Ireland
- Occupation: Production inspector

Sport
- Sport: Hurling
- Position: Full-back
Club
- Years: Club
- Éire Óg
Club titles
- Clare titles: 1
Inter-county
- Years: County
- 1993–1994: Clare
Inter-county titles
- Munster titles: 0
- All-Irelands: 0
- NHL: 0
- All Stars: 0

Francis Corey (born 8 April 1971) is an Irish retired hurler. At club level he played with Éire Óg and at inter-county level with the Clare senior hurling team.

== Career ==
Corey played hurling and Gaelic football as a student at St Flannan's College in Ennis. He lined out in all grades and was captain of the college's senior team that won the Dr Harty Cup title in 1989 after beating Shannon Comprehensive School in an all-Clare final. Corey also lined out in the subsequent one-point All-Ireland final defeat by St Kieran's College.

At club level, Corey lined out as a dual player at all levels with Éire Óg. He was at left corner-back for the club's 1–05 to 1–03 win over O'Callaghan's Mills to claim the Clare SHC title in 1990.

At inter-county level, Corey first appeared for Clare as a member of the minor team. He won a Munster MHC medal before losing to Offaly in the 1989 All-Ireland MHC final. He later progressed to the under-21 team, with his last game in that grade being the 1992 Munster under-21 HC final defeat by Waterford.

Corey later progressed to the Clare junior team. After winning a Munster JHC title in 1993, he later won an All-Ireland JHC medal after a defeat of Kilkenny in the subsequent All-Ireland final. Corey was later drafted onto the senior team for at the start of the 1993–94 league.

== Honours ==
St Flannan's College

- Dr Harty Cup: 1989 (c)

Éire Óg

- Clare Senior Hurling Championship: 1990
- Clare Minor A Hurling Championship: 1989

Clare

- All-Ireland Junior Hurling Championship: 1993
- Munster Junior Hurling Championship: 1993
- Munster Minor Hurling Championship: 1989
