= 1989–90 Harty Cup =

Hurling tournament

1989–90 Dr Harty Cup
- Dates: 11 October 1989 – 25 March 1990
- Teams: 15
- Champions: St Flannan's College (15th title); Jamesie O'Connor (captain)
- Runners-up: Nenagh CBS; Eddie Tucker (captain)

Tournament statistics
- Matches played: 16
- Goals scored: 56 (3.5 per match)
- Points scored: 258 (16.13 per match)
- Top scorer(s): Conor O'Riordan (2-22)

The 1989–90 Harty Cup was the 70th staging of the Harty Cup since its establishment by the Munster Council of Gaelic Athletic Association in 1918. The competition ran from 11 October 1989 to 25 March 1990.

St Flannan's College entered the competition as the defending champions.

The final was played on 25 March 1990 at the Gaelic Grounds in Limerick, between St Flannan's College and Nenagh CBS, in what remains their only meeting in the final. St Flannan's College won the match by 0–10 to 0–03 to claim their 15th Harty Cup title overall and a second successive title.

North Monastery's Conor O'Riordan was the top scorer with 2-22.

== Results ==
=== First round ===
11 October 1989 First round	Shannon Comprehensive School	2-06 - 1-08	St Finbarr's College	Dr Mannix Sportsfield
	M Purcell 2-1, J Mulanphy 0-2, D Riordan 0-2, F Devine 0-1.		K Murray 0-4, S O'Riordan 1-0, C Fleming 0-2, J Collins 0-1, D O'Mulvey 0-1.

11 October 1989 First round	Coláiste Iognáid Rís	1-03 - 2-08	Presentation De La Salle	Mitchelstown Grounds
	D Herlihy 1-0, J Murray 0-1, R Breen 0-1, M Burke 0-1.		J O'Shea 1-3, G Cunningham 1-0, M Walsh 0-3, D McAuliffe 0-1, S O'Meara 0-1.

11 October 1989 First round	Thurles CBS	0-02 - 3-18	Abbey CBS	Cahir Grounds
	T Thomond 0-1, P Burke 0-1.		M Gleeson 0-7, B Roche 2-0, D McGrath 1-3, D Hogan 0-3, G McGuire 0-2, M Moroney 0-2, J Kiely 0-1.

11 October 1989 First round	Ardscoil Rís	2-03 - 2-05	Nenagh CBS	St Ailbe's Park
	T Pierce 1-2, S Strict 1-1, K O'Loughlin 0-1.		D Hogan 1-0, C McDonald 1-0, O Daly 0-2, Hynes 0-2, B Shanahan 0-1.

11 October 1989 First round	Limerick CBS	1-12 - 1-06	De La Salle College	Clonmel GAA Ground
	D Clarke 0-5, M Murnane 1-0, J Howard 0-2, D O'Grady 0-2, N Doolin 0-1, E Butler 0-1, I O'Mahony 0-1.		C Sweeney 1-1, J Byrne 0-3, J McDermott 0-1, O Dunphy 0-1.

11 October 1989 First round	Coláiste Chríost Rí	2-11 - 3-14	North Monastery	Páirc Uí Chaoimh
	T Doolin 2-6, D Meade 0-2, P McCarthy 0-1, L Sisk 0-1, T O'Callaghan 0-1.		B Egan 1-6, A Goulding 1-3, C O'Riordan 1-2, C Murphy 0-1, A McCarthy 0-1, C Walsh 0-1.

13 October 1989 First round	St Flannan's College	2-07 - 0-04	Midleton CBS	FitzGerald Park
	D Flynn 1-0, J Healy 1-0, D McCarthy 0-3, J O'Connor 0-3, A Whelan 0-1.		B Corcoran 0-2, C Dillon 0-1, B Gleeson 0-1.

=== Quarter-finals ===
15 November 1989 Quarter-final	Abbey CBS	1-07 - 1-07	Nenagh CBS	Boherlahan Grounds
	M Gleeson 1-5, J Kiely 0-1, B Roche 0-1.		J Doughan 1-2, E Daly 0-2, B Flannery 0-2, M Sheehan 0-1.

15 November 1989 Quarter-final	Presentation De La Salle	2-03 - 3-05	Shannon Comprehensive School	Cappamore Grounds
	G Cunningham 1-0, M Wallace 1-0, M Walsh 0-2, W Madden 0-1.		D Kirby 2-0, S McGettrick 1-0, R Divinney 0-2, S Power 0-1, D Riordan 0-1, M Purcell 0-1.

15 November 1989 Quarter-final	St Flannan's College	3-15 - 3-04	St Colman's College	Leahy Park
	A Whelan 1-3, J O'Connor 0-6, T McEnery 1-1, J Healy 1-0, D McCarthy 0-2, D Tobin 0-2, E Cotter 0-1.		M Landers 2-2, D Keohane 1-0, A O'Brien 0-1, M Hogan 0-1.

15 November 1989 Quarter-final	North Monastery	4-15 - 1-09	Limerick CBS	Dr Mannix Sportsfield
	C O'Riordan 0-7, A Goulding 1-3, M Brosnan 1-1, C Murphy 1-0, A McCarthy 1-0, B Egan 0-2, C Walsh 0-1, C Lynch 0-1.		D Clarke 1-1, T O'Neill 0-4, D Stanners 0-2, N Doolan 0-1, I O'Mahony 0-1.

29 November 1989 Quarter-final replay	Abbey CBS	4-07 - 4-16 (aet)	Nenagh CBS	Boherlahan Grounds
	M Moroney 3-0, J Daly 1-2, M Gleeson 0-4, J Kiely 0-1.		J Doughan 1-10, O Daly 1-2, B Flannery 1-0, C Madden 1-0, M Sheehan 0-3, B Gaynor 0-1.

=== Semi-finals ===
25 February 1990 Semi-final	Nenagh CBS	1-07 - 2-02	Shannon Comprehensive School	Bruff Grounds
	J Doughan 1-4, D Hogan 0-2, B Gaynor 0-1.		G McGettrick 1-0, J Mulanphy 1-0, D Riordan 0-2.

4 March 1990 Semi-final	St Flannan's College	1-13 - 1-13	North Monastery	Leahy Park
	J O'Connor 0-8, J Healy 1-0, A Whelan 0-3, D McCarthy 0-1, D Tobin 0-1.		C O'Riordan 1-12, B Egan 0-1.

11 March 1990 Semi-final replay	St Flannan's College	1-09 - 2-04	North Monastery	Leahy Park
	T McEnery 1-0, J O'Connor 0-3, A Whelan 0-3, D McCarthy 0-2, D Tobin 0-1.		B Egan 1-2, J Kidney 1-0, C O'Riordan 0-1, A McCarthy 0-1.

=== Final ===
25 March 1990 Final	St Flannan's College	0-10 - 0-05	Nenagh CBS	Gaelic Grounds
	J O'Connor 0-7, A Whelan 0-3.		C Madden 0-2, J Doughan 0-1.	Referee: W Horgan (Cork)

== Statistics ==
=== Top scorers ===
Rank	Player	County	Tally	Total	Matches	Average
1	Conor O'Riordan	North Monastery	2-22	28	4	7.00
2	Jamesie O'Connor	St Flannan's College	0-27	27	5	5.40
3	John Doughan	Nenagh CBS	3-17	26	5	5.20
4	Michael Gleeson	Abbey CBS	1-16	19	3	6.33
5	Barry Egan	North Monastery	2-11	17	4	4.25
