= Paul Lee (hurler) =

Irish hurler

Personal information
- Native name: Pól Ó Laoi (Irish)
- Born: 1 March 1971 (age 55) Shannon, County Clare, Ireland

Sport
- Sport: Hurling
- Position: Full-back
Club
- Years: Club
- Wolfe Tones na Sionna
Club titles
- Clare titles: 1
- Munster titles: 1
- All-Ireland Titles: 0
College
- Years: College
- Waterford RTC
College titles
- Fitzgibbon titles: 2
Inter-county
- Years: County
- 1990–1995: Clare
Inter-county titles
- Munster titles: 0
- All-Irelands: 0
- NHL: 0
- All Stars: 0

Paul Lee (born 1 March 1971) is an Irish retired hurler. At club level he played with Wolfe Tones na Sionna and at inter-county level with the Clare senior hurling team.

== Playing career ==
Lee played hurling as a student at St Patrick's Comprehensive School in Shannon. He lined out in all grades and was part of the school's senior team that was beaten by St Flannan's College in an all-Clare Dr Harty Cup final in 1989. Lee later studied at Waterford RTC and won Fitzgibbon Cup medals in 1992 and 1995.

At club level, Lee played at all levels with the Wolfe Tones na Sionna club. He won Clare MAHC and U21AHC titles before progressing to the club's senior team. Lee won a Clare SHC medal in 1996 following a 1–11 to 0–08 win over Sixmilebridge in the final. He later added a Munster Club SHC medal to his collection before a 0–14 to 1–08 defeat by Athenry in the 1997 All-Ireland club final.

At inter-county level, Lee first appeared for Clare as captain of the minor team. He won a Munster MHC medal before later losing to Offaly in the 1989 All-Ireland MHC final. He later progressed to the under-21 team. Lee made a number of appearances for the senior team between 1990 and 1995.

== Management career ==
Lee was a selector when Wolfe Tones beat Broadford to claim the Clare IHC title in 2015, before later winning the Munster Club IHC title.

== Honours ==
=== Player ===
Wolfe Tones na Sionna

- Munster Senior Club Hurling Championship: 1996
- Clare Senior Hurling Championship: 1996, 2006
- Clare Under-21 A Hurling Championship: 1989
- Clare Minor A Hurling Championship: 1988

Waterford RTC

- Fitzgibbon Cup: 1992, 1995

Clare

- Munster Minor Hurling Championship: 1989

=== Management ===
Wolfe Tones na Sionna

- Munster Intermediate Club Hurling Championship: 2015
- Clare Intermediate Hurling Championship: 2015

Sporting positions
| Preceded by Ian Mulready | Care minor hurling team captain 1989 | Succeeded by Pat Minogue |
