= 1989 All-Ireland Minor Football Championship =

Gaelic football competition

Championship details

All-Ireland Champions
- Winning team: Derry (3rd win)

All-Ireland Finalists
- Losing team: Offaly

Provincial Champions
- Munster: Kerry
- Leinster: Offaly
- Ulster: Derry
- Connacht: Roscommon

The 1989 All-Ireland Minor Football Championship was the 58th staging of the All-Ireland Minor Football Championship, the Gaelic Athletic Association's premier inter-county Gaelic football tournament for boys under the age of 18.

Kerry entered the championship as defending champions, however, they were defeated by Offaly in the All-Ireland semi-final.

On 17 September 1989, Derry won the championship following a 3-9 to 1-6 defeat of Offaly in the All-Ireland final. This was their third All-Ireland title and their first title in six championship seasons.

== Results ==
=== Connacht Minor Football Championship ===
Semi-Finals

25 June 1989 Semi-Final	Galway	0-09 - 0-07	Mayo	St Jarlath's Park, Tuam

2 July 1989 Semi-Final	Roscommon	0-14 - 1-06	Sligo	Dr Hyde Park, Roscommon

Final

23 July 1989 Final	Roscommon	0-13 - 2-08	Galway	McHale Park, Castlebar

30 July 1989 Final Replay	Roscommon	2-11 - 0-15	Galway	Dr Hyde Park, Roscommon

=== Leinster Minor Football Championship ===
Preliminary Round

1989 Preliminary Round	Louth	0-12 - 0-07	Laois	St Conleth's Park, Newbridge

1989 Preliminary Round	Wicklow	0-11 - 0-08	Carlow	Dr Cullen Park, Carlow

1989 Preliminary Round	Kildare	2-13 - 0-03	Kilkenny

1989 Preliminary Round	Westmeath	2-09 - 1-08	Louth	Cusack Park, Mullingar

Quarter-Finals

1989 Quarter-Final	Meath	1-06 - 1-04	Louth	Waterstown

1989 Quarter-Final	Wicklow	1-08 - 2-07	Longford	Aughrim Park, Aughrim

1989 Quarter-Final	Offaly	2-06 - 1-09	Meath	O'Connor Park, Tullamore

1989 Quarter-Final	Kildare	0-08 - 0-07	Dublin	St Conleth's Park, Newbridge

Semi-Finals

1989 Semi-Final	Kildare	0-14 - 1-05	Longford	St Conleth's Park, Newbridge

1989 Semi-Final	Offaly	2-09 - 1-07	Meath	Croke Park, Dublin

Final

30 July 1989 Final	Offaly	2-11 - 0-07	Kildare	Croke Park, Dublin

=== Munster Minor Football Championship ===
Quarter-Final

1989 Quarter-Final	Clare	1-06 - 3-04	Waterford	Bansha

Semi-Finals

1989 Semi-Final	Kerry	2-11 - 0-06	Waterford	Ned Hall Park, Clonmel

1989 Semi-Final	Tipperary	1-05 - 3-12	Cork	Ned Hall Park, Clonmel

Final

23 July 1989 Final	Kerry	2-10 - 2-09	Cork	Fitzgerald Stadium, Killarney

=== Ulster Minor Football Championship ===
Preliminary Round

1989 Preliminary Round	Antrim	1-06 - 3-07	Monaghan	Casement Park, Belfast

Quarter-Finals

1989 Quarter-Final	Cavan	2-14 - 2-09	Down	Breffni Park, Cavan

1989 Quarter-Final	Derry	2-10 - 0-11	Fermanagh	St. Molaise Park, Irvinestown

1989 Quarter-Final	Armagh	0-10 - 0-07	Tyrone	Healy Park, Omagh

1989 Quarter-Final	Down	0-12 - 1-10	Monaghan	St Mary's Park, Castleblaney

Semi-Finals

1989 Semi-Final	Derry	3-11 - 2-11	Cavan	St Tiernach's Park, Clones

1989 Semi-Final	Monaghan	1-04 - 2-07	Armagh	St Mary's Park, Castleblaney

Final

16 July 1989 Final	Derry	2-15 - 2-03	Armagh	St Tiernach's Park, Clones

=== All-Ireland Minor Football Championship ===
Semi-Finals

13 August 1989 Semi-Final	Derry	4-16 - 1-07	Roscommon	Croke Park, Dublin

20 August 1989 Semi-Final	Kerry	0-08 - 0-14	Offaly	Croke Park, Dublin

Final

17 September 1989 Final	Derry	2-09 - 1-06	Offaly	Croke Park, Dublin

== Statistics ==
Offaly win the Leinster Championship for the first time since 1965.

Four men played for Offaly in both the 1989 All-Ireland MFC and 1989 All-Ireland Minor Hurling Championship finals: Finbarr Cullen, Seán Grennan, Kevin Flynn and Niall Hand.
