= Paul O'Rourke =

Paul O'Rourke may refer to:

- Paul F. O'Rourke (1924–2012), founding member of Operation USA
- Paul O'Rourke (hurler) (born 1972), Irish hurler
