= Damien Barron =

Irish hurler (born 1972)

Personal information
- Native name: Damien Barún (Irish)
- Born: 1972 (age 53–54) Kilcormac, County Offaly, Ireland
- Occupation: Nurse

Sport
- Sport: Hurling
- Position: Right corner-back
Club
- Years: Club
- Kilcormac–Killoughey
Club titles
- Offaly titles: 0
Inter-county
| Years | County | Apps (scores) |
| 1992-1993 | Offaly | 0 (0-00) |
Inter-county titles
- Leinster titles: 0
- All-Irelands: 0
- NHL: 0
- All Stars: 0

Damien Barron (born 1972) is an Irish former hurler. At club level, he played with Kilcormac–Killoughey and at inter-county level with the Offaly senior hurling team.

== Career ==
Barron attended Kilcormac Vocational School and played hurling in all grades during his time there. His performances earned his inclusion on the Offaly vocational schools' team and he won a Leinster VS SHC title in 1989. Barron first played for club side Kilcormac–Killoughey at juvenile and underage levels before progressing to adult level.

At inter-county level, Barron first played for Offaly as a member of the minor team. He was at right wing-back when Offaly beat Clare by 2–16 to 1–12 in the 1989 All-Ireland MHC final. Barron later progressed to the under-21 team and won consecutive Leinster U21HC medals in 1991 and 1992, however, these provincial wins were subsequently followed by consecutive All-Ireland U21HC final defeats. Barron made his senior team debut in a National Hurling League game against Down in October 1992.

== Honours ==
Offaly Vocational Schools

- Leinster Vocational School's Senior Hurling Championship (1): 1989

Offaly

- Leinster Under-21 Hurling Championship (2): 1991, 1992
- All-Ireland Minor Hurling Championship (1): 1989
- Leinster Minor Hurling Championship (1): 1989
