= 1991 Cork Senior Hurling Championship =

Annual hurling competition season

- Dates: 28 April – 22 September 1991
- Teams: 18
- Champions: Midleton (7th title); Ger FitzGerald (captain); Paddy FitzGerald (manager)
- Runners-up: Glen Rovers; Liam Martin (captain); Donie O'Donovan (manager)

Tournament statistics
- Matches played: 18
- Goals scored: 58 (3.22 per match)
- Points scored: 402 (22.33 per match)
- Top scorer(s): Ger O'Riordan (1-22)

The 1991 Cork Senior Hurling Championship was the 103rd staging of the Cork Senior Hurling Championship since its establishment by the Cork County Board in 1887. The draw for the opening fixtures took place on 16 December 1990. The championship began on 28 April 1991 and ended on 22 September 1991.

Na Piarsaigh entered the championship as the defending champions, however, they were defeated by Blackrock in the second round.

The final was played on 22 September 1991 at Páirc Uí Chaoimh in Cork between Midleton and Glen Rovers, in what was their first meeting in a final in 53 years. Midleton won the match by 1–17 to 1–08 to claim their seventh championship title overall and their first title since 1987.

Ger O'Riordan was the championship's top scorer with 1-22.

== Results ==
=== First round ===
28 April 1991 First round	University College Cork	2-07 - 3-08	Sarsfields	Páirc Uí Chaoimh
	A Tobin 1-1, J Ryan 1-1, C Casey 0-3, P Heffernan 0-1, J Magnier 0-1.		P O'Callaghan 2-1, N Ahern 1-1, T Murphy 0-4, T McAuliffe 0-2.	Referee: J O'Leary (Na Piarsaigh)

12 May 1991 First round	Carrigdhoun	1-12 - 0-14	Imokilly	Páirc Uí Chaoimh
	M Fitzpatrick 0-5, A O'Driscoll 1-0, J O'Mahony 0-2, L Kelly 0-2, S McCarthy 0-1, D McCarthy 0-1, DJ Kiely 0-1.		C Clancy 0-7, R Lewis 0-4, P O'Shea 0-2, G Scully 0-1.	Referee: D McCarthy (St. Finbarr's)

=== Second round ===
5 May 1991 Second round	Glen Rovers	1-16 - 1-09	Erin's Own	Riverstown
	J Fitzgibbon 1-5, J Buckley 0-4, P Horgan 0-2, K McGuckian 0-2, C Ring 0-2, T Murray 0-1.		B Corcoran 1-5, PJ Murphy 0-1, F Horgan 0-1, C Dillon 0-1, T Kelleher 0-1.	Referee: F Murphy (Blackrock)

11 May 1991 Second round	Avondhu	1-09 - 3-17	Midleton	Castlelyons
	T Kelleher 1-2, J Sheehan 0-2, J Keane 0-2, G Heddigan 0-2, J Linehan 0-1.		K Hennessy 2-1, G Fitzgerald 0-7, M O'Mahony 1-1, P O'Brien 0-3, Cormac Quirke 0-3, D Quirke 0-1, J Hartnett 0-1.	Referee: G Harrington (Carrigaline)

11 May 1991 Second round	Duhallow	3-08 - 0-13	Seandún	Ballyanly
	T Burke 2-3, N Brosnan 1-1, J O'Connor 0-1, J Sheehan 0-1, J Browne 0-1, J Noonan 0-1.		A O'Sullivan 0-3, C Coffey 0-3, B Egan 0-2, L Meaney 0-2, T Hurley 0-1, M Lyons 0-1, J Corcoran 0-1.	Referee: L O'Flynn (Éire Óg)

12 May 1991 Second round	Ballyhea	2-09 - 1-12	Muskerry	Kanturk Sportsfield
	D O'Flynn 2-0, A Morrissey 0-3, C Brassil 0-2, J O'Callaghan 0-1, M O'Callaghan 0-1, I Ronan 0-1, J Mortell 0-1.		G Manley 0-9, P O'Flynn 1-0, G Nagle 0-2, K Murray 0-1.	Referee: R Murphy (Lyre)

12 May 1991 Second round	St. Finbarr's	1-12 - 2-07	Sarsfields	Páirc Uí Chaoimh
	B Cunningham 0-4, B O'Shea 0-3, C Finn 1-0, T Finn 0-2, M Barry 0-1, Conor Ryan 0-1, Christy Ryan 0-1.		B Óg Murphy 1-1, N Ahern 1-0, M Flynn 0-2, T McAuliffe 0-2, B Lotty 0-1, P O'Callaghan 0-1.	Referee: J O'Leary (Na Piarsaigh)

18 May 1991 Second round replay	Ballyhea	2-14 - 2-10	Muskerry	Kanturk Sportsfield
	D O'Flynn 1-2, A Morrissey 0-4, I Ronan 1-0, J O'Callaghan 0-3, D O'Riordan 0-2, P Ryan 0-2, M O'Callaghan 0-1.		G Manley 1-7, D O'Driscoll 1-1, M O'Mahony 0-1, J Murphy 0-1.	Referee: P Spillane (Carrigtwohill)

19 May 1991 Second round	Blackrock	2-12 - 2-11	Na Piarsaigh	Páirc Uí Chaoimh
	M Dineen 1-2, A Ryan 0-4, J Murphy 1-0, J Cashman 0-3, E Kavanagh 0-2, M Harrington 0-1.		J O'Connor 1-1, D Kidney 1-1, J Twomey 0-2, R Sweeney 0-2, T O'Sullivan 0-2, R McDonnell 0-1, M Dineen 0-1, M Mullins 0-1.	Referee: J Motherway (Aghada)

19 May 1991 Second round	Carbery	1-18 - 3-04	Valley Rovers	Páirc Uí Ríogáin
	G O'Connell 1-2, P Crowley 0-5, T Brennan 0-4, M Foley 0-3, B Harte 0-2, D Healy 0-1, C Murphy 0-1.		C O'Donovan 2-0, A Crowley 1-1, J Shiels 0-1, N Kelleher 0-1, M Cronin 0-1.	Referee: P Spillane (Carrigtwohill)

9 June 1991 Second round	Milford	2-11 - 1-13	Carrigdhoun	Páirc Mac Gearailt
	N Fitzgibbon 1-1, S Sheehan 0-4, M Fitzgibbon 1-0, S O'Gorman 0-3, V Sheehan 0-2, B O'Connell 0-1.		D Lombard 1-0, DJ Kiely 0-3, J O'Mahony 0-3, L Kelly 0-2, P Ahern 0-2, K Kingston 0-2, J Dineen 0-1.	Referee: J Motherway (Aghada)

=== Quarter-finals ===
28 July 1991 Quarter-final	Ballyhea	0-16 - 0-08	Blackrock	Páirc Mac Gearailt
	A Morrissey 0-10, T Brassill 0-1, J O'Callaghan 0-1, M O'Callaghan 0-1, E Morrissey 0-1, I Ronan 0-1, D O'Flynn 0-1.		E Kavanagh 0-2, A Ryan 0-2, N O'Leary 0-1, M Harrington 0-1, P O'Leary 0-1, M Dineen 0-1.	Referee: W Horgan (Brian Dillons)

3 August 1991 Quarter-final	Glen Rovers	1-23 - 1-05	Duhallow	Coachford Sportsfield
	G Riordan 1-10, D Whitley 0-3, P Horgan 0-2, K McGuckin 0-2, C Ring 0-2, J Buckley 0-2, T Mulcahy 0-1, J Buckley 0-1.		L Noonan 1-0, T Burke 0-3, N Brosnan 0-1, J O'Connor 0-1.	Referee: J Motherway (Aghada)

4 August 1991 Quarter-final	Milford	2-09 - 1-09	St. Finbarr's	Páirc Mac Gearailt
	V Sheehan 1-6, M Fitzgibbon 1-0, S Stritch 0-2, N Fitzgibbon 0-1.		B Cunningham 1-3, B O'Shea 0-2, M Barry 0-1, C Finn 0-1, T Finn 0-1, F Ramsey 0-1.

11 August 1991 Quarter-final	Midleton	5-08 - 3-09	Carbery	Páirc Uí Chaoimh
	K Hennessy 2-2, M O'Mahony 2-1, D Quirke 1-3, Cormac Quirke 0-1, P Hartnett 0-1.		P Crowley 1-5, Harte 1-2, M Foley 1-1, D O'Connell 0-1.	Referee: L O'Flynn (Éire Óg)

=== Semi-finals ===
25 August 1991 Semi-final	Glen Rovers	2-10 - 1-11	Milford	Carrowkeel Sportsfield
	G Riordan 0-5, P Horgan 1-1, J Buckley 1-0, C Ring 0-2, J Fitzgibbon 0-2.		V Sheehan 1-1, P Buckley 0-3, P Madigan 0-3, B O'Connell 0-2, S Stritch 0-1, S O'Gorman 0-1.	Referee: L O'Flynn (Éire Óg)

8 September 1991 Semi-final	Midleton	4-11 - 0-12	Ballyhea	Páirc Uí Chaoimh
	P O'Brien 2-1, M O'Mahony 1-2, J Fenton 0-5, J Boylan 1-0, G Fitzgerald 0-2, N O'Neill 0-1.		A Morrissey 0-5, I Ronan 0-4, D O'Flynn 0-1, M O'Callaghan 0-1, J O'Sullivan 0-1.	Referee: W Horgan (Brian Dillons)

=== Finals ===
22 September 1991 Final	Midleton	1-17 - 1-08	Glen Rovers	Páirc Uí Chaoimh
	J Fenton 0-7, P O'Brien 0-4, C Quirke 1-0, G Fitzgerald 0-2, K Hennessy 0-2, J Boylan 0-1, P Hartnett 0-1.		G Riordan 0-7, C Ring 1-0, P Horgan 0-1.	Attendance: 18,000; Referee: W Horgan (Cork)

== Championship statistics ==
=== Top scorers ===
Overall

Rank	Player	Club	Tally	Total	Matches	Average
1	Ger O'Riordan	Glen Rovers	1-22	25	4	6.25
2	Alec Morrissey	Ballyhea	0-22	22	4	5.50
3	Ger Manley	Muskerry	1-16	19	2	9.50
4	Kevin Hennessy	Midleton	4-05	17	3	5.66
5	Michael O'Mahony	Midleton	4-04	16	4	4.00
6	Vincent Sheehan	Milford	2-09	15	3	5.00
7	Paudie O'Brien	Midleton	2-08	14	4	3.50
8	Diarmuid O'Flynn	Ballyhea	3-04	13	2	6.50
8	Pádraig Crowley	Carbery	1-10	13	2	6.50
10	Tim Burke	Duhallow	2-06	12	2	6.00
10	John Fenton	Midleton	0-12	12	2	6.00

In a single game

Rank	Player	Club	Tally	Total	Opposition
1	Ger O'Riordan	Glen Rovers	1-10	13	Duhallow
2	Ger Manley	Muskerry	1-07	10	Ballyhea
2	Alec Morrissey	Ballyhea	0-10	10	Blackrock
4	Tim Burke	Duhallow	2-03	9	Seandún
4	Vincent Sheehan	Milford	1-06	9	St. Finbarr's
4	Ger Manley	Muskerry	0-09	9	Ballyhea
7	Kevin Hennessy	Midleton	2-02	8	Carbery
7	John Fitzgibbon	Glen Rovers	1-05	8	Erin's Own
7	Brian Corcoran	Erin's Own	1-05	8	Glen Rovers
7	Pádraig Crowley	Carbery	1-05	8	Midleton

=== Miscellaneous ===
- Ballyhea recorded their first ever championship victory over Blackrock.
- The final meeting of Midleton and Glen Rovers was their first championship final meeting since 1938.
