= 1993–94 Harty Cup =

Hurling tournament

1993–94 Dr Harty Cup
- Dates: 20 October 1993 – 27 March 1994
- Teams: 16
- Champions: North Monastery (19th title); Brian Hurley (captain)
- Runners-up: Midleton CBS; Éamonn Canavan (captain)

Tournament statistics
- Matches played: 19
- Goals scored: 46 (2.42 per match)
- Points scored: 310 (16.32 per match)
- Top scorer(s): Dave Bennett (1-22); Johnny Enright (0-25)

The 1993–94 Harty Cup was the 74th staging of the Harty Cup since its establishment in hurling by the Munster Council of Gaelic Athletic Association in 1918. The competition ran from 20 October 1993 to 27 March 1994.

Limerick CBS unsuccessfully defended their title in the semi-finals against Midleton CBS .

North Monastery won the Harty Cup final on 27 March 1994 at Páirc Mac Gearailt in Fermoy, for their 19th successive Harty Cup title overall and their last title since 1986. against Midleton CBS, 1–09 to 0–04, in what was their second successive meeting overall in a final and their first meeting in eight years.

Dave Bennett and Johnny Enright were the top scorers.

== Results ==
=== First round ===
20 October 1993 First round	Midleton CBS	1-14 - 1-08	Hamilton High School	Carrignavar Grounds
	M Meaney 1-3, D Hogan 0-4, J Deane 0-3, P Mullaney 0-2, E Canavan 0-2.		J O'Donovan 0-5, A Quirke 1-0, B Murphy 0-1, C O'Donoghue 0-1, J Murphy 0-1.

20 October 1993 First round	Coláiste Chríost Rí	1-07 - 1-13	Nenagh CBS	Knocklong Sports Field
	O Fitzgerald 1-1, D Duffy 0-2, S Twomey 0-2, F Walsh 0-1, T Morrison 0-1.		D Quinn 1-5, M O'Leary 0-5, D McGrath 0-1, J Maher 0-1, A Slattery 0-1.

20 October 1993 First round	St Colman's College	0-07 - 2-03	Limerick CBS	Fr Con Buckley Park
	L O'Connor 0-3, C O'Flaherty 0-2, P O'Connor 0-1, T Hickey 0-1.		T Tierney 1-0, T Fitzgerald 1-0, P Neenan 0-3.

20 October 1993 First round	De La Salle College Waterford	1-14 - 1-14	Lismore CBS	Stradbally Grounds
	F Crowley 1-1, T Grace 0-4, D McGrath 0-2, J Ryan 0-2, S Costelloe 0-2, C Keane 0-1, M Sweeney 0-1.		D Bennett 0-8, E O'Brien 1-0, D Shanahan 0-2, E Bennett 0-1, S Barry 0-1, E Quann 0-1, J Twomey 0-1.

20 October 1993 First round	Abbey CBS	1-02 - 1-04	CBS Charleville	Gaelic Grounds
	D Leahy 1-0, M Collins 0-1, D Fogarty 0-1.		D Ronan 1-0, S O'Halloran 0-2, D Foley 0-1, J Collins 0-1.

20 October 1993 First round	North Monastery	2-09 - 0-03	Scarriff Community School	Ballyagran Grounds
	M Daly 1-1, C O'Sullivan 1-0, K Egan 0-3, A Coughlan 0-2, P Ryan 0-1, J Anderson 0-1, D O'Sullivan 0-1.		D Forde 0-2, R Bebbington 0-1.

20 October 1993 First round	Doon CBS	1-05 - 3-20	St Flannan's College	MacDonagh Park

20 October 1993 First round	Thurles CBS	1-15 - 0-09	St Finbarr's College	Ballygiblin Grounds
	J Enright 0-5, B Lamphier 0-4, S Hickey 1-0, A Kirby 0-2, G Flanagan 0-2, P Dwyer 0-1, M O'Dowd 0-1.		T Murphy 0-5, L Harte 0-2, J Kingston 0-1, G Fitzgerald 0-1

10 November 1993 First round replay	De La Salle College Waterford	2-05 - 3-14	Lismore CBS	Stradbally Grounds
	D McGrath 1-0, C Keane 1-0, F Crowley 0-3, D Jordan 0-1, S Costelloe 0-1.		D Shanahan 2-4, D Bennett 1-7, S Curley 0-1, E Quann 0-1, E Bennett 0-1.

=== Quarter-finals ===
17 November 1993 Quarter-final	Thurles CBS	1-14 - 2-11	St Flannan's College	Cappamore Grounds
	J Enright 0-11, L Ryan 1-1, G Flanagan 0-1, B Lamphier 0-1.		B Tobin 0-5, F Flynn 1-1, R Eade 1-1, M Connellan 0-3, E Flynn 0-1.

17 November 1993 Quarter-final	North Monastery	1-11 - 1-09	CBS Charleville	Páirc Mac Gearailt
	D O'Sullivan 0-6, J Anderson 1-0, K Egan 0-2, G O'Connor 0-1, P Ryan 0-1, A Coughlan 0-1.		S O'Halloran 1-2, N Ronan 0-4, D Ronan 0-1, D Foley 0-1, E O'Brien 0-1.

17 November 1993 Quarter-final	Midleton CBS	5-13 - 2-04	Nenagh CBS	Clonmel GAA Ground
	P Mullaney 2-2, J Deane 1-3, M Dunne 1-2, D Hogan 0-5, M Meaney 1-0, P Barry 0-1.		J Nevin 1-1, M Bevans 1-0, D Quinn 0-2, M O'Leary 0-1.

24 November 1993 Quarter-final	Limerick CBS	3-09 - 0-09	Lismore CBS	Ballygiblin Grounds
	P O'Brien 1-2, A Purcell 0-4, T Fitzgerald 1-0, P Neenan 1-0, B Foley 0-2, J O'Donnell 0-1.		D Bennett 0-7, D Shanahan 0-1, E Bennett 0-1.

13 March 1994 Quarter-final replay	Thurles CBS	3-07 - 1-12	St Flannan's College	Cappamore Grounds
	A Kirby 2-0, J Enright 0-5, G Flanagan 1-0, P O'Dwyer 0-1, B Lamphier 0-1.		B Tobin 1-3, D Hoey 0-3, C Shannon 0-1, G Glynn 0-1, G Looby 0-1, M Tobin 0-1, E Flynn 0-1, M Conlon 0-1.

=== Semi-finals ===
13 March 1994 Semi-final	Midleton CBS	2-14 - 0-07	Limerick CBS	Fr Con Buckley Park
	P Mullaney 2-1, D Hogan 0-5, M Meaney 0-2, E Canavan 0-2, M O'Connell 0-2, P Barry 0-1, J Deane 0-1.		A Purcell 0-3, B Foley 0-2, P Neenan 0-1, T Fitzgerald 0-1.

20 March 1994 Semi-final	North Monastery	2-06 - 1-05	Thurles CBS	Mitchelstown Grounds
	D French 1-0, A Coughlan 1-0, D O'Sullivan 0-2, P Ryan 0-2, J Anderson 0-1, K Egan 0-1.		J Enright 0-4, M O'Dowd 1-0, P O'Dwyer 0-1.

=== Final ===
27 March 1994 Final	North Monastery	1-09 - 0-04	Midleton CBS	Páirc Mac Gearailt
	J Anderson 1-0, D O'Sullivan 0-3, M Daly 0-2, K Egan 0-2, P Ryan 0-1, K O'Shea 0-1.		D Hogan 0-3, P Mullaney 0-1.	Referee: PJ Corby (Clonmel)
