= Conor Clancy =

Conor Clancy may refer to:

- Conor Clancy (Clare hurler) (born 1971)
- Conor Clancy (Offaly hurler) (born 1993)
