= 1989 Croke Cup =

Irish hurling competition

- Dates: 23 April - 7 May 1989
- Teams: 3
- Champions: St Kieran's College (9th title); Pat O'Neill (captain)
- Runners-up: St Flannan's College; Francis Corey (captain)

Tournament statistics
- Matches played: 2
- Goals scored: 5 (2.5 per match)
- Points scored: 35 (17.5 per match)
- Top scorer(s): D. J. Carey (3-03)

The 1989 Croke Cup was the 38th staging of the Croke Cup since its establishment by the Gaelic Athletic Association in 1944. The competition ran from 23 April to 7 May 1989.

St Kieran's College were the defending champions.

The final was played on 7 May 1989 at MacDonagh Park in Nenagh, between St Kieran's College and St Flannan's College, in what was their fifth meeting in the final overall and a first meeting in two years. St Kieran's College won the match by 3–05 to 1–09 to claim their ninth Croke Cup title overall and a second title in succession.

D. J. Carey was the top scorer with 3-03.

== Qualification ==
Province	Champions
Connacht	St Mary's College
Leinster	St Kieran's College
Munster	St Flannan's College

== Results ==
=== Semi-final ===
23 April 1989 Semi-final	St Flannan's College	1-16 - 0-05	St Mary's College	Duggan Park
	J O'Connor 0-6, L Meaney 1-0, C Clancy 0-3, A Whelan 0-3, P Markham 0-2, D Maher 0-1, S Sheehy 0-1.		P Howley 0-2, J Flannery 0-1, P Coyne 0-1, A Furey 0-1.

=== Final ===
7 May 1989 Final	St Kieran's College	3-05 - 1-09	St Flannan's College	MacDonagh Park
	DJ Carey 3-3, C Brennan 0-1, P O'Neill 0-1.		P Markham 0-4, M Holland 1-0, C Clancy 0-3, J O'Connor 0-2.	Referee: W Horgan (Cork)

== Statistics ==
=== Top scorers ===
Overall

Rank	Player	County	Tally	Total	Matches	Average
1	D. J. Carey	St Kieran's College	3-03	12	1	12.00
2	Jamesie O'Connor	St Flannan's College	0-08	8	2	4.00
3	Conor Clancy	St Flannan's College	0-06	6	2	3.00
3	Pat Markham	St Flannan's College	0-06	6	2	3.00
