= Seán Grennan =

Irish Gaelic footballer

Seán Grennan is an Irish former dual player of Gaelic football and hurling who played for the Offaly county teams. He attended St Joseph & St Saran's Secondary School in Ferbane.

Grennan played for Offaly in the 1989 All-Ireland Minor Hurling Championship final and the 1989 All-Ireland Minor Football Championship final, winning the first and losing the second. He won a Leinster Senior Football Championship (SFC) medal in 1997. The following year, he won a National Football League medal. He played as forward. In late 2003, Offaly manager Gerry Fahey dropped Grennan from his panel.
