= Conor Clancy (Clare hurler) =

Irish hurler (born 1971)

Personal information
- Native name: Conchúr Mac Lannchaidh (Irish)
- Nickname: Claws
- Born: 26 November 1971 (age 54) Inch, County Clare, Ireland
- Occupation: Project manager
- Height: 6 ft 1 in (185 cm)

Sport
- Sport: Hurling
- Position: Full-forward
Club
- Years: Club
- Kilmaley
Club titles
- Clare titles: 1
College(s)
- Years: College
- 1989–1992 1998–2001: Galway-Mayo IT; University of Limerick
College titles
- Fitzgibbon titles: 0
Inter-county
Years	County	Apps (scores)
1991–2002	Clare	21 (2-09)
Inter-county titles
- Munster titles: 3
- All-Irelands: 2
- NHL: 0
- All Stars: 0

Conor Clancy (born 26 November 1971) is an Irish retired hurler. At club level he played with Kilmaley and at inter-county level with the Clare senior hurling team.

== Career ==
Clancy played hurling as a student at St Flannan's College in Ennis and lined out in all grades during his time there. After winning a Dean Ryan Cup medal in 1988, he was part of the college's senior team that won the Dr Harty Cup title in 1989 after beating Shannon Comprehensive School in an all-Clare final. Clancy also lined out in the subsequent one-point All-Ireland final defeat by St Kieran's College.

After finishing his schooling, Clancy later played with University of Limerick in the Fitzgibbon Cup. At club level, he played at all levels with Kilmaley. Clancy was at centre-forward for the club's 1–10 to 1–09 defeat of St Joseph's Doora-Barefield in the 2004 Clare SHC final.

At inter-county level, Clancy first appeared for Clare as a member of the minor team. He won a Munster MHC medal before later losing to Offaly in the 1989 All-Ireland MHC final. He later progressed to the under-21 team, with his last game in that grade being the 1992 Munster under-21 HC final defeat by Waterford.

Clancy progressed to senior level and was full-forward on the Clare team that bridged a 63-year gap to win the Munster SHC title in 1995. He later claimed an All-Ireland SHC medal after Clare beat Offaly to claim the title for the first time in 81 years. Clancy won a second Munster SHC title in 1997, before claiming a second All-Ireland SHC winners' medal after a defeat of Tipperary in the 1997 All-Ireland final. He won a third Munster SHC medal in four seasons in 1998.

== Honours ==
St Flannan's College

- Dr Harty Cup: 1989
- Dean Ryan Cup: 1988

Kilmaley

- Clare Senior Hurling Championship: 2004

Clare

- All-Ireland Senior Hurling Championship: 1995, 1997
- Munster Senior Hurling Championship: 1995, 1997, 1998
- Munster Minor Hurling Championship: 1989
