= Ger O'Riordan =

Irish hurler

Personal information
- Native name: Gearóid Ó Riordáin (Irish)
- Born: 1967 (age 58–59) Blackpool, Cork, Ireland

Sport
- Sport: Hurling
- Position: Right wing-forward
Clubs
- Years: Club
- Glen Rovers; St Nicholas'
Club titles
- Cork titles: 1
Inter-county
Years	County	Apps (scores)
1988–1989	Cork	0 (0-00)
Inter-county titles
- Munster titles: 0
- All-Irelands: 0
- NHL: 0
- All Stars: 0

Ger O'Riordan (born 1967) is an Irish hurling manager and former player. At club level, he played with Argideen Rangers, divisional side Carbery, and also lined out at inter-county level with various Cork teams.

== Career ==
O'Riordan played hurling at all levels as a student at the North Monastery in Cork. He was part of the "North Mon" team that won the Dr Harty Cup title in 1985, before later winning a Dr Croke Cup medal after a 4–11 to 1–05 defeat of St Brendan's Community School in the 1985 All-Ireland colleges final.

At club level, O'Riordan played hurling with Glen Rovers. He won a Cork MHC medal in 1985, after a 0-14 to 0-07 win over St Patrick's, Fermoy in the final. O'Riordan later progressed to adult level and won a Cork SHC medal after the 4-15 to 3-13 win over Sarsfields in the 1989 final.

O'Riordan first appeared on the inter-county scene with Cork at minor level in 1985. He won a Munster MHC medal that year, before later claiming an All-Ireland MHC after a 3-10 to 0-12 defeat of Wexford in the 1985 All-Ireland minor final. O'Riordan also progressed to the senior team and made a number of appearances in the National Hurling League.

== Honours ==
St Finbarr's College

- Dr Croke Cup: 1985
- Dr Harty Cup: 1985

Glen Rovers

- Cork Senior Hurling Championship: 1989
- Cork Minor Hurling Championship: 1985

Cork

- All-Ireland Minor Hurling Championship: 1985
- Munster Minor Hurling Championship: 1985
