= 1987–88 Harty Cup =

Hurling tournament

1987–88 Dr Harty Cup
- Dates: 17 February – 17 April 1988
- Teams: 12
- Champions: Midleton CBS (1st title); John Dillon (captain)
- Runners-up: Thurles CBS; Theo Lloyd (captain)

Tournament statistics
- Matches played: 13
- Goals scored: 52 (4 per match)
- Points scored: 179 (13.77 per match)
- Top scorer(s): Paudie O'Brien (6-05); Pat Healy (4-11)

The 1987–88 Harty Cup was the 68th staging of the Harty Cup since its establishment in hurling by the Munster Council of Gaelic Athletic Association in 1918. The competition contested from 17 February to 17 April 1988.

St Flannan's College unsuccessfully defended its title, in a semi-final replay against Midleton CBS.

Midleton CBS won the Harty Cup final, 2–07 to 2–03, on 17 April 1988 at the Mitchelstown Grounds, against Thurles CBS, in what was their second meeting in the final overall and first meeting since 1950. It was Midleton CBS' first ever Harty Cup title.

== Results ==
=== First round ===
17 February 1988 First round	St Flannan's College	5-05 - 0-05	North Monastery	Dr Mannix Sportsfield
	P Healy 2-2, A Neville 1-1, P McNamara 1-0, M Holland 1-0, T Herbert 0-1, G Rodgers 0-1.		D Kidney 0-2, S Guiheen 0-2, G Maguire 0-1.

17 February 1988 First round	Thurles CBS	0-11 - 0-09	Abbey CBS	The Park
	B O'Dwyer 0-5, S Quinn 0-3, P Lloyd 0-2, P Jordan 0-1.		G Cross 0-7, C Brennan 0-1, S O'Halloran 0-1.

17 February 1988 First round	St Patricks Comprehensive School	5-07 - 1-06	De La Salle College Waterford	Mitchelstown Grounds
	P Keary 1-5, J Crowe 2-1, P O'Rourke 1-0, S Brosnan 1-0, C Chaplin 0-1.		P Fitzgerald 1-0, N Dalton 0-3, F Hartley 0-1, J McDermott 0-1, J Brenner 0-1.

17 February 1988 First round	Coláiste Chríost Rí	3-08 - 1-14	Limerick CBS	Fr Con Buckley Park
	C Corkery 1-2, A Maher 1-0, T Doolan 1-0, J Coogan 0-3, B O'Shea 0-2, J O'Connell 0-1.		C Shields 1-4, D Noone 0-4, J Fitzgibbon 0-3, S Moynihan 0-1, C Doolin 0-1, N Carey 0-1.

24 February 1988 First round replay	Coláiste Chríost Rí	1-04 - 2-08	Limerick CBS	Fr Con Buckley Park
	T Doolin 1-0, J Coogan 0-2, S Bradley 0-2.		D Noone 0-6, S Stanton 1-0, S Moynihan 1-0, J Fitzgibbon 0-2.

=== Quarter-finals ===
24 February 1988 Quarter-final	St Flannan's College	3-10 - 0-03	St Patrick's Comprehensive School	Cusack Park
	P Healy 1-4, A Neville 1-3, M Holland 1-0, G Moroney 0-2, P O'Neill 0-1.		P Keary 0-3.

24 February 1988 Quarter-final	Midleton CBS	4-11 - 0-05	St Colman's College	Caherlag Grounds
	P O'Brien 3-0, F Abernethy 1-1, K McCarthy 0-4, D Quirke 0-2, J Dillon 0-2, T Kelleher 0-1, B Cotter 0-1.		F Hanrahan 0-3, P Davern 0-1, K Roche 0-1.

2 March 1988 Quarter-final	Thurles CBS	3-03 - 0-09	St Finbarr's College	Mitchelstown Grounds
	T Lloyd 2-1, P Dundon 1-0, B O'Dwyer 0-1, S Quinn 0-1.		I Lynham 0-5, E Gough 0-1, P Kelleher 0-1, N Daly 0-1, D Fleming 0-1.

2 March 1988 Quarter-final	Coláiste Iognáid Rís	5-05 - 3-08	Limerick CBS	Dr Mannix Sportsfield
	B Allen 4-0, A Brady 1-0, F O'Connor 0-2, F Mackey 0-2, K Swan 0-1.		N Carey 1-2, J Fitzgerald 1-0, M Moore 1-0, D Noone 0-3, D Considine 0-3.

=== Semi-finals ===
13 March 1988 Semi-final	Thurles CBS	3-10 - 1-05	Coláiste Iognáid Rís	Mitchelstown Grounds
	B O'Dwyer 0-7, G O'Connor 2-0, P Dundon 1-0, T Lloyd 0-2, S Quinn 0-1.		B Allen 1-1, F Mackey 0-3, M Burke 0-1.

13 March 1988 Semi-final	Midleton CBS	1-07 - 2-04	St Flannan's College	Boherlahen Grounds
	P O'Brien 1-1, J Dillon 0-2, T Kelleher 0-1, P Smith 0-1, D Quirke 0-1, C O'Regan 0-1.		G Moroney 1-0, A Neville 1-0, P Healy 0-3, G Rodgers 0-1.

20 March 1988 Semi-final replay	Midleton CBS	4-05 - 2-07	St Flannan's College	Boherlahen Grounds
	J Dillon 0-4, T Kelleher 1-0, P O'Brien 1-0, F Abernethy 1-0, C O'Regan 1-0, D Quirke 0-1.		P Healy 1-2, A Neville 1-0, T Herbert 0-3, L Meaney 0-1, D Maher 0-1.

=== Final ===
17 April 1988 Final	Midleton CBS	2-07 - 2-03	Thurles CBS	Mitchelstown Grounds
	P O'Brien 1-4, D Quirke 1-0, J Dillon 0-2, F Abernethy 0-1.		G O'Connor 1-1, S Quinn 1-0, B O'Dwyer 0-2.	Referee: T Murray (Limerick)

== Statistics ==
=== Top scorers ===
Rank	Player	County	Tally	Total	Matches	Average
1	Paudie O'Brien	Midleton CBS	6-05	23	4	5.75
1	Pat Healy	St Flannan's College	4-11	23	4	5.75
3	Bernard Allen	Coláiste Iognáid Rís	5-01	16	2	8.00
3	Alan Neville	St Flannan's College	4-04	16	4	4.00
5	Brian O'Dwyer	Thurles CBS	0-15	15	4	3.75
