= 1985–86 Harty Cup =

Hurling tournament

1985–86 Dr Harty Cup
- Dates: 5 February – 23 March 1986
- Teams: 12
- Champions: North Monastery (18th title); John Healy (captain); Murt Murphy (manager)
- Runners-up: Midleton CBS; Declan Motherway (captain); Donal Power (manager)

Tournament statistics
- Matches played: 11
- Goals scored: 39 (3.55 per match)
- Points scored: 187 (17 per match)
- Top scorer(s): Tony O'Keeffe (1-23)

The 1985–86 Harty Cup was the 66th staging of the Harty Cup since its establishment in hurling by the Munster Council of Gaelic Athletic Association in 1918. The competition ran from 5 February to 23 March 1986.

North Monastery successfully defended its title.

North Monastery won the Harty Cup final, 1–12 to 0–09, on 23 March 1986 at Páirc Uí Chaoimh in Cork, against Midleton CBS, in what was their first ever meeting in the final. It was North Monastery's 18th successive Harty Cup title overall and a second consecutive title.

North Monastery's Tony O'Keeffe was the top scorer with 1-23.

== Results ==
=== First round ===
| 5 February 1986 First round | North Monastery | 2-15 - 1-07 | Limerick CBS | Dr Mannix Sportsfield |
| | T O'Keeffe 1-8, B O'Sullivan 1-0, M Lynch 0-2, R Feeney 0-2, J Healy 0-2, G Healy 0-1. | | M Galligan 1-6, S Leo 0-1 |

| 5 February 1986 First round | Coláiste Iognáid Rís | 5-12 - 2-02 | Our Lady's Secondary School | Ballygiblin Grounds |
| | M Burns 4-1, D Walsh 1-6, K O'Brien 0-2, B Cunningham 0-2, C Finn 0-1. | | C Stakelum 1-2, R Ryan 1-0. |

| 5 February 1986 First round | De La Salle College Waterford | 4-15 - 1-05 | Cashel CBS | Kilsheelan Grounds |
| | L Lawlor 1-3, L Hartley 0-6, P Hogan 1-2, B Sullivan 1-1, J Dunphy 1-0, M Mahony 0-2, S Lyons 0-1. | | C Bonnar 1-0, M Perdue 0-1, P Ryan 0-1, B Ryan 0-1, K Cussen 0-1, P Kearns 0-1. |

| 5 February 1986 First round | St Flannan's College | 0-15 - 1-07 | Coláiste Chríost Rí | Golden Grounds |
| | P Healy 0-6, C Egan 0-4, M McNamara 0-3, T Herbert 0-1, R McMahon 0-1. | | T Toomey 1-2, S O'Brien 0-4, R Lotty 0-1. |

=== Quarter-finals ===
| 13 February 1986 Quarter-final | Thurles CBS | 0-10 - 2-03 | St Finbarr's College | Mitchelstown Grounds |
| | B Mullaney 0-2, G Loughnane 0-2, R Keher 0-2, P Cahill 0-1, N Sheehan 0-1, K Ryan 0-1, P Ryan 0-1. | | D O'Connell 2-1, S O'Rourke 0-1, N O'Connell 0-1. |

| 19 February 1986 Quarter-final | De La Salle College Waterford | 2-07 - 0-12 | St Flannan's College | Canon Hayes Park |
| | P Hoban 1-1, J Dunphy 1-0, L Hartley 0-2, J Lawlor 0-2, B Drohan 0-1, S Lyons 0-1. | | P Healy 0-4, T Herbert 0-3, C Egan 0-2, G Ryan 0-1, R McMahon 0-1, N McNamara 0-1. |

| 19 February 1986 Quarter-final | North Monastery | 5-09 - 3-08 | Coláiste Iognáid Rís | Páirc Uí Chaoimh |
| | B Healy 2-1, D Hurley 2-0, P Cummins 1-0, R Feeney 0-3, T O'Keeffe 0-3, A Goulding 0-1, K Wall 0-1. | | J Lenihan 2-0, K O'Brien 1-2, D Walsh 0-4, B Cunningham 0-2. |

| 19 February 1986 Quarter-final | Midleton CBS | 8-12 - 2-05 | St Colman's College | Páirc Bhríde |
| | W Lawton 3-1, P O'Brien 3-0, C Enright 1-2, J Corcoran 0-5, L O'Connell 1-0, J Walsh 0-2, D Motherway 0-1, J Dillon 0-1. | | S O'Leary 1-1, P O'Brien 1-1, K Roche 0-3. |

=== Semi-finals ===
| 2 March 1986 Semi-final | North Monastery | 4-07 - 3-08 | De La Salle College Waterford | Boherlahen Grounds |
| | A Goulding 2-0, T O'Keeffe 0-6, D Hurley 1-0, R Feeney 1-0, G Healy 0-1. | | P Hoban 1-5, M Mahony 1-0, E Brennan 1-0, L Hartley 0-2, B Sullivan 0-1. |

| 2 March 1986 Semi-final | Midleton CBS | 2-06 - 1-03 | Thurles CBS | Mitchelstown Grounds |
| | J Walsh 1-1, P O'Brien 1-1, J Corcoran 0-4. | | P Cahill 1-0, A Ryan 0-2, G Loughnane 0-1. |

=== Final ===
| 23 March 1986 Final | North Monastery | 1-12 - 0-09 | Midleton CBS | Páirc Uí Chaoimh |
| | T O'Keeffe 0-6, M McElhinney 1-0, J Healy 0-3, G Healy 0-1, D Hurley 0-1, M Lynch 0-1. | | J Corcoran 0-5, D Motherway 0-1, L Ramsell 0-1, W Lawton 0-1, J Dillon 0-1. | Referee: G Long (Tipperary) |

== Statistics ==
=== Top scorers ===
| Rank | Player | County | Tally | Total | Matches | Average |
|---|---|---|---|---|---|---|
| 1 | Tony O'Keeffe | North Monastery | 1-23 | 26 | 4 | 6.50 |
| 2 | Pat Hoban | De La Salle College | 3-08 | 17 | 3 | 5.66 |
| 3 | John Corcoran | Midleton CBS | 0-14 | 14 | 3 | 4.66 |
| 4 | Morgan Burns | Coláiste Iognáid Rís | 4-01 | 13 | 2 | 6.50 |
| 4 | Pádraig O'Brien | De La Salle College | 4-01 | 13 | 3 | 4.33 |
| 4 | Dave Walsh | Coláiste Iognáid Rís | 1-10 | 13 | 3 | 4.33 |
| 7 | Willie Lawton | Midleton CBS | 3-02 | 11 | 3 | 3.66 |
| 8 | Donncha Hurley | North Monastery | 3-01 | 10 | 4 | 2.50 |
| 8 | Pat Healy | St Flannan's College | 0-10 | 10 | 2 | 5.00 |
| 10 | Mike Galligan | Limerick CBS | 1-06 | 9 | 1 | 9.00 |
