= Jamesie O'Connor =

Irish hurler

Personal information
- Native name: Séamus Ó Conchubhair (Irish)
- Born: 28 July 1972 (age 54) Knocknaheeney, Cork City, bc Ireland
- Occupation: Secondary school teacher
- Height: 5 ft 8 in (173 cm)

Sport
- Sport: Hurling
- Position: Midfielder
Club
- Years: Club
- St Joseph's Doora-Barefield
Club titles
- Clare titles: 3
- Munster titles: 2
- All-Ireland Titles: 1
College
- Years: College
- University College Galway
Inter-county
Years	County	Apps (scores)
1992–2004	Clare	42 (2–148)
Inter-county titles
- Munster titles: 3
- All-Irelands: 2
- NHL: 0
- All Stars: 4

Jamesie O'Connor (born 28 July 1972) is an Irish former hurler who played as a midfielder for the Clare senior team.

O'Connor made his first appearance for the team during the 1992–93 National League and became a regular member of the starting fifteen until his retirement after the 2004 championship. During that time he won two All-Ireland medals, three Munster medals and four All-Star awards. He ended up as an All-Ireland runner-up on one occasion.

At club level, O'Connor was an All-Ireland medalist with St Joseph's Doora-Barefield. He also won two Munster medals and three county club championship medals.

== Early and personal life ==
The son of a Clare-born mother and a County Galway father, O'Connor was born in Knocknaheeney, Cork City. As a child he supported the Galway team that won three All-Ireland titles in the 1980s. In 1982 the O'Connor family moved to Ennis, County Clare where his father ran his own business.

O'Connor was educated at St Flannan's College in Ennis before studying at University College Galway (UCG). As of 2017, he was working as a business studies teacher at St Flannan's. James's siblings include Christy O'Connor, John O'Connor, Sheila O'Connor and Claire O'Connor.

== Playing career ==
=== College ===
O'Connor played with St Flannan's College in the inter-colleges championship. A defeat of nearby rivals Shannon Comprehensive in 1989 gave him his first Dr Harty Cup medal. St Flannan's later faced St Kieran's College in the All-Ireland decider, but O'Connor's side was beaten on a 3–5 to 1–9 score line.

Flannan's retained the provincial title in 1990 with O'Connor collecting a second Harty Cup medal following a defeat of Nenagh CBS. He later lined out in a second All-Ireland final, however, St Kieran's College took the title once again following a 2–10 to 0–7 victory.

While attending UCG, O'Connor played in the Fitzgibbon Cup.

=== Club ===
O'Connor played his club hurling with St Joseph's Doora-Barefield.

At youth level, he won a county minor championship medal in 1990, adding a county under-21 championship medal to his collection in 1993. By this stage O'Connor had also joined the club's top team. He won a county intermediate championship medal in 1993, propelling St Joseph's Doora-Barefield into the senior ranks.

After losing two championship deciders to Clarecastle at senior level, O'Connor won his first championship medal in 1998 following a defeat of Kilmaley. He later added a Munster medal to his collection following a 0–12 to 0–8 defeat of Toomevara. St Joseph's later completed their landmark season with a 2–14 to 0–8 trouncing of Rathnure in the All-Ireland decider, giving O'Connor an All-Ireland Senior Club Hurling Championship medal.

St Joseph's continued their run of success in 1999 with O'Connor winning a second successive county club championship medal. He later won a second Munster winners' medal following 4–9 to 3–8 defeat of Ballygunner. St Joseph's subsequently qualified for the All-Ireland final and the chance to become the second team in history to retain their title. Athenry provided the opposition and defeated O'Connor's side by 0–16 to 0–12.

After being defeated in their bid for a third consecutive county championship, St Joseph's returned in 2001. A 1–15 to 1–12 defeat of Sixmilebridge gave O'Connor his third and final county club championship medal.

=== Inter-county ===
O'Connor came to prominence on the inter-county scene as a member of the Clare minor hurling team in 1989. He won a Munster medal that year following a narrow 2–12 to 2–11 defeat of Limerick. The subsequent All-Ireland decider resulted in a 2–16 to 1–12 defeat by Offaly.

He later played for a few years with the Clare under-21 team.

O'Connor joined the Clare senior team during the 1992–93 National League before making his championship debut in the subsequent provincial championship campaign.

O'Connor won his first Munster medal in 1995 following a surprise 1–17 to 0–11 defeat of reigning champions Limerick. It was Clare's first provincial success in sixty-three years. O'Connor's side later qualified for the All-Ireland final and were the underdogs against reigning champions Offaly. Although trailing at half-time, substitute Éamonn Taaffe scored a crucial goal to propel Clare to a 1–13 to 2–8 victory. It was their first championship title in 81 years. As well as collecting an All-Ireland medal, O'Connor was later honoured with his first All-Star award.

After surrendering their provincial and All-Ireland crowns in 1996, a 1–18 to 0–18 defeat of Tipperary gave O'Connor a second Munster medal in three years. Clare subsequently qualified for the All-Ireland decider. Due to the introduction of the "back-door" system, Tipperary provided the opposition in the first all-Munster All-Ireland final. Clare were in the lead for much of the game, but Liam Cahill and Eugene O'Neill scored twice for Tipp in the last ten minutes. John Leahy missed a goal chance in the last minute while another Tipp point was ruled wide. At the full-time whistle, Clare won by a single point on a score line of 0–20 to 2–13. It was a second All-Ireland medal for O'Connor while he was also named as the man of the match. He later collected a second All-Star before being the unanimous choice as Hurler of the Year.

O'Connor won his third and final Munster medal in 1998 following a tense draw and a replay with Waterford. Clare drew with Offaly in the All-Ireland semi-final, but in the replay Clare were winning by two points when the referee, Jimmy Cooney, blew the whistle with two minutes of normal time left to be played. The Offaly fans were outraged and staged a sit-down protest on the Croke Park pitch. The result was not allowed to stand and Clare were forced to meet Offaly for a third time that year. They lost the second replay. O'Connor later won a third All-Star award.

Clare qualified for the All-Ireland final again in 2002. O'Connor's side put up a good fight against Kilkenny, but a combined tally of 2–13 for both Henry Shefflin and D. J. Carey gave the Cats a seven-point victory.

O'Connor continued to line out with Clare for the next two seasons but called time on his inter-county career following the team's exit from the 2004 championship.

== Post-playing ==
O'Connor has done co-commentary for the BBC and has written for the Sunday Independent. He previously provided match analysis for Sky Sports.

== Honours ==
St Flannan's College

- Dr Harty Cup (2): 1989, 1990 (c)
- Dean Ryan Cup (1): 1988

St Joseph's Doora-Barefield

- All-Ireland Senior Club Hurling Championship (1): 1999
- Munster Senior Club Hurling Championship (2): 1998, 1999
- Clare Senior Club Hurling Championship (3): 1998, 1999, 2001

Clare

- All-Ireland Senior Hurling Championship (2): 1995, 1997
- Munster Senior Hurling Championship (3): 1995, 1997, 1998

Individual

- All-Stars (4): 1995, 1997, 1998, 2001
- All Stars Hurler of the Year (1): 1997
- Texaco Hurler of the Year (1): 1997
- All-Ireland Senior Hurling Championship Final Man of the Match (1): 1997

Awards
Preceded by Liam Dunne (Wexford)	All-Ireland SHC final Man of the Match; 1997	Succeeded by Brian Whelahan (Offaly)
Preceded by Larry O'Gorman (Wexford)	Texaco Hurler of the Year; 1997	Succeeded by Brian Whelahan (Offaly)
Preceded by Larry O'Gorman (Wexford)	Eircell Hurler of the Year; 1997	Succeeded by Tony Browne (Waterford)
