= 1988–89 Harty Cup =

Hurling tournament

1988–89 Dr Harty Cup
- Dates: 5 October 1988 – 12 March 1989
- Teams: 12
- Champions: St Flannan's College (14th title); Francis Corey (captain)
- Runners-up: Shannon Comprehensive School; Paul Lee (captain)

Tournament statistics
- Matches played: 13
- Goals scored: 40 (3.08 per match)
- Points scored: 219 (16.85 per match)
- Top scorer(s): Conor Clancy (1-16)

The 1988–89 Harty Cup was the 69th staging of the Harty Cup since its establishment in hurling by the Munster Council of Gaelic Athletic Association in 1918. The competition ran from 5 October 1988 to 12 March 1989.

Midleton CBS were the defending champions, however, they were beaten by Shannon Comprehensive School after a semi-final repaly.

The final was played on 12 March 1989 at Cusack Park in Ennis, between St Flannan's College and Shannon Comprehensive School, in what remains their only meeting in the final. St Flannan's College won the match by 0–09 to 0–05 to claim their 14th championship title overall and a first title in two years.

Conor Clancy was the top scorer with 1-16.

== Results ==
=== First round ===
5 October 1988 First round	Limerick CBS	2-12 - 1-08	Tipperary CBS	FitzGerald Park
	J Fitzgibboon 1-3, N Casey 1-2, J Mulqueen 0-3, C Doolin 0-2, D Noone 0-1, D Stanners 0-1.		V Ryan 0-7, D O'Shea 1-1.

5 October 1988 First round	Shannon Comprehensive School	3-15 - 2-04	Coláiste Chríost Rí	Dr Mannix Sportsfield
	D Collins 1-3, P Keary 0-5, M Purcell 1-1, P McNamara 1-1, P O'Rourke 0-2, C Fitzgerald 0-1, D O'Riordan 0-1, C Chaplin 0-1.		J O'Connell 1-2, T Doolan 1-0, B O'Shea 0-1, F O'Halloran 0-1.

5 October 1988 First round	St Finbarr's College	3-06 - 1-08	Thurles CBS	Mitchelstown Grounds
	D Fleming 2-3, P Barrett 1-0, P Casey 0-2, R Fitzgibbon 0-1.		T Coman 1-6, D Long 0-1, M McElgun 0-1.

12 October 1988 First round	St Flannan's College	3-15 - 0-04	St Colman's College	FitzGerald Park
	M Holland 2-1, D Maher 1-1, J O'Connor 0-3, P Markham 0-3, M Scanlan 0-3, C Clancy 0-3, A Whelan 0-1.		I O'Callaghan 0-2, P Davern 0-1, R Lynch 0-1.

12 October 1988 First round	North Monastery	2-06 - 1-08	Nenagh CBS	St Ailbe's Park
	C O'Riordan 1-4, I Aherne 1-0, A Elliott 0-1, A Goulding 0-1.		T Carroll 1-4, J Kennedy 0-3, E Hogan 0-1.

=== Quarter-finals ===
19 October 1988 Quarter-final	Limerick CBS	3-10 - 3-07	De La Salle College	Clonmel GAA Ground
	J Fitzgibbon 0-7, C Doolin 2-0, M Murnane 1-0, D Noone 0-2, N Casey 0-1.		J Byrne 1-1, J Brenner 0-4, P Hogan 1-0, A Fitzgerald 1-0, J McDermott 0-1, D Frampton 0-1.

19 October 1988 Quarter-final	Shannon Comprehensive School	3-15 - 1-09	Coláiste Iognáid Rí	Dr Mannix Sportsfield
	C Chaplin 1-2, M Purcell 1-2, P O'Rourke 0-5, D Collins 1-1, P Keary 0-3, D Riordan 0-1, S Power 0-1.		P Buckley 1-2, M Burke 0-5, K McTernan 0-1, B Allen 0-1.

19 October 1988 Quarter-final	Midleton CBS	1-14 - 2-06	St Finbarr's College	Bride Park
	C Quirke 1-1, P Smith 0-4, T Kelleher 0-4, M Quirke 0-2, K McCarthy 0-2, C O'Regan 0-1.		P Casey 0-4, D Fleming 1-0, D O'Mahony 1-0, P Newman 0-1, J Smith 0-1.

26 October 1988 Quarter-final	St Flannan's College	3-08 - 0-06	North Monastery	Bruff Grounds
	A Whelan 2-0, C Clancy 1-3, S Sheedy 0-2, S Maher 0-1, J O'Connor 0-1, M Holland 0-1.		C Riordan 0-1, G Maguire 0-1, I Ahearne 0-1.

=== Semi-finals ===
18 February 1989 Semi-final	St Flannan's College	1-15 - 0-05	Limerick CBS	Dr Mannix Sportsfield
	C Clancy 0-6, D Maher 1-2, S Sheedy 0-2, P Markham 0-2, M Holland 0-2, J O'Connor 0-1.		J Fitzgibbon 0-2, J Mulqueen 0-2, E Shanahan 0-1.

19 February 1989 Semi-final	Midleton CBS	2-03 - 1-06	Shannon Comprehensive School	St Ailbe's Park
	B Corcoran 1-0, C O'Regan 1-0, T Kelleher 0-1, K McCarthy 0-1, P Smith 0-1.		P Keary 1-2, P McNamara 0-2, S Power 0-1, D Riordan 0-1.

4 March 1989 Semi-final replay	Midleton CBS	0-07 - 2-08	Shannon Comprehensive School	Dr Mannix Sportsfield
	T Kelleher 0-3, P Smyth 0-2, B Gleeson 0-1, E Crotty 0-1.		D Collins 1-1, P McNamara 1-1, P Keary 0-3, P O'Rourke 0-2, D Riordan 0-1.

=== Final ===
12 March 1989 Final	St Flannan's College	0-09 - 0-05	Shannon Comprehensive School	Cusack Park
	C Clancy 0-4, M Holland 0-3, J O'Connor 0-1, T McEnery 0-1.		P McNamara 0-2, P Keary 0-2, D Collins 0-1.	Referee: W Horgan (Cork)

== Statistics ==
=== Top scorers ===
Rank	Player	County	Tally	Total	Matches	Average
1	Conor Clancy	St Flannan's College	1-16	19	4	4.75
2	Paul Keary	Shannon Comprehensive	1-15	18	5	3.60
3	Derek Collins	Shannon Comprehensive	3-06	15	5	3.00
3	John Fitzgibbon	Limerick CBS	1-12	15	3	5.00
5	Michael Holland	St Flannan's College	2-07	13	4	3.25
