= 1988 All-Ireland Minor Football Championship =

Gaelic football competition

Championship details

All-Ireland Champions
- Winning team: Kerry (10th win)
- Captain: Danny Cahill

All-Ireland Finalists
- Losing team: Dublin

Provincial Champions
- Munster: Kerry
- Leinster: Dublin
- Ulster: Tyrone
- Connacht: Galway

The 1988 All-Ireland Minor Football Championship was the 57th staging of the All-Ireland Minor Football Championship, the Gaelic Athletic Association's premier inter-county Gaelic football tournament for boys under the age of 18.

Down entered the championship as defending champions and were defeated in the Ulster Championship.

On 18 September 1988, Kerry won the championship following a 2-5 to 0-5 defeat of Dublin in the All-Ireland final. This was their 10th All-Ireland title and their first title in eight championship seasons.

== Results ==
=== Connacht Minor Football Championship ===
Quarter-Final

May 1988 Quarter-Final	Mayo	3-11- 1-07	Roscommon	James Stephens Park, Ballina

Semi-Finals

26 June 1988 Semi-Final	Galway	2-08 - 1-09	Roscommon	Markievicz Park, Sligo

3 July 1988 Semi-Final	Sligo	1-08 - 3-11	Mayo	Markievicz Park, Sligo

Final

24 July 1988 Final	Galway	2-09 - 3-04	Mayo	Dr Hyde Park, Roscommon

=== Munster Minor Football Championship ===
Semi-Finals

June 1988 Semi-Final	Cork	2-10 - 1-10	Tipperary	Páirc Uí Chaoimh, Cork

June 1988 Semi-Final	Kerry	2-16 - 1-03	Waterford	Killorglin

Final

3 July 1988 Final	Kerry	1-08 - 0-10	Cork	Páirc Uí Chaoimh, Cork

=== Leinster Minor Football Championship ===
First Round

15 May 1988 First Round	Louth	0-15 - 0-05	Kilkenny	Drogheda Park, Drogheda https://commons.wikimedia.org/wiki/File:Louth_V_Kilkenny_minor_football_May_1988.jpg

May 1988 First Round	Laois	2-10 - 2-07	Carlow	Dr. Cullen Park, Carlow

22 May 1988 First Round	Longford	0-06 - 0-02	Westmeath	Pearse Park Longford

May 1988 First Round	Wexford	2-03 - 1-08	Offaly

Quarter-Finals

June 1988 Quarter-Final	Dublin	2-10 - 1-04	Laois	O'Moore Park, Portlaoise

June 1988 Quarter-Final	Kildare	1-08 - 0-06	Offaly	St Conleth's Park, Newbridge

June 1988 Quarter-Final	Meath	1-09 - 0-07	Louth	Dundalk

June 1988 Quarter-Final	Wicklow	0-11 - 0-11	Longford	Pearse Park, Longford

June 1988 Quarter-Final Replay	Wicklow	1-14 - 0-09	Longfrod

Semi-Finals

July 1988 Semi-Final	Dublin	2-15 - 0-07	Wicklow	Cusack Park, Mullingar

July 1988 Semi-Final	Kildare	0-07 - 0-08	Meath	Croke Park, Dublin

Final

31 July 1988 Final	Dublin	4-06 - 0-08	Meath	Croke Park, Dublin

=== Ulster Minor Football Championship ===
Preliminary Round

1988 Preliminary Round	Fermanagh	1-09 - 1-08	Armagh

Quarter-Finals

1988 Quarter-Final	Cavan	0-11 - 2-05	Monaghan	St Tiernach's Park, Clones

1988 Quarter-Final Replay	Cavan	0-10 - 1-06	Monaghan	Breffni Park, Cavan

1988 Quarter-Final	Down	2-12 - 2-07	Derry	Dean McGlinchey Park, Ballinascreen

1988 Quarter-Final	Tyrone	0-18 - 0-01	Antrim	Healy Park, Omagh

1988 Quarter-Final	Donegal	2-11 - 1-05	Fermanagh	Athletic Grounds, Armagh

Semi-Finals

1988 Semi-Final	Cavan	1-08 - 0-07	Down	Breffni Park, Cavan

1988 Semi-Final	Tyrone	1-06 - 0-06	Donegal	St. Molaise Park, Irvinestown

Final

17 July 1988 Final	Tyrone	2-07 - 0-03	Cavan	St Tiernach's Park, Clones

=== All-Ireland Minor Football Championship ===
Semi-Finals

14 August 1988 Semi-Final	Kerry	1-08 - 0-10	Tyrone	Croke Park, Dublin

21 August 1988 Semi-Final	Galway	0-07 - 1-09	Dublin	Croke Park, Dublin

Final

18 September 1988 Final	Kerry	2-05 - 0-05	Dublin	Croke Park, Dublin
