= 1986–87 Harty Cup =

Hurling tournament

1986–87 Dr Harty Cup
- Dates: 11 February – 29 March 1987
- Teams: 12
- Champions: St Flannan's College (13th title); Justin Quinlan (captain)
- Runners-up: Midleton CBS; Colman Quirke (captain)

Tournament statistics
- Matches played: 12
- Goals scored: 51 (4.25 per match)
- Points scored: 179 (14.92 per match)
- Top scorer(s): Michael Hickey (4-14)

The 1986–87 Harty Cup was the 67th staging of the Harty Cup since its establishment in hurling by the Munster Council of Gaelic Athletic Association in 1918. The competition ran from 11 February to 29 March 1987.

North Monastery unsuccessfully defended its title, in the semi-finals, by losing to St Flannan's College.

St Flannan's College won the Harty Cup final, 3–12 to 2–06, on 29 March 1987 at FitzGerald Park in Kilmallock, against Midleton CBS, in what was their second meeting in the final overall and a first meeting since 1944. It was St Flannan's 13th successive Harty Cup title overall and a last Cup title since 1983.

Limerick CBS's Michael Hickey was the top scorer with 4–14.

== Results ==
=== First round ===
| 11 February 1987 First round | Coláiste Iognáid Rís | 2-03 - 0-10 | De La Salle College Waterford | Cappoquin Grounds |
| | B Cunningham 1-2, J Lenihan 1-1. | | J Lawlor 0-7, C Donegan 0-1, N Warren 0-1, A Qualter 0-1. |

| 11 February 1987 First round | North Monastery | 6-08 - 1-01 | Nenagh CBS | Dr Mannix Sportsfield |
| | A Goulding 3-0, G Healy 1-3, P Cummins 1-0, D Hurley 1-0, B O'Sullivane 0-2, G Maguire 0-2, T Allen 0-1. | | J Hassett 1-0, L Sheedy 0-1. |

| 11 February 1987 First round | Coláiste Chríost Rí | 1-02 - 3-07 | Thurles CBS | Mitchelstown Grounds |
| | J Coogan 1-1, S Calnan 0-1. | | F Stakelum 2-0, S Quinn 1-1, B Carroll 0-3, R Corcoran 0-1, J Lloyd 0-1, G O'Connor 0-1. |

| 11 February 1987 First round | St Flannan's College | 2-12 - 1-05 | St Colman's College | St Ailbe's Park |
| | M McNamara 0-5, T Canny 0-4, J Quinlan 1-0, G Rodgers 0-1, P Conlon 0-1, E Slattery 0-1. |

=== Quarter-finals ===
| 25 February 1987 Quarter-final | Limerick CBS | 3-08 - 2-07 | St Finbarr's College | Dr Mannix Sportsfield |
| | M Hickey 3-7, T Minihane 0-1. | | K Murphy 1-1, C Deane 0-4, R Clifford 1-0, S Foley 0-1, M Sheehan 0-1. |

| 25 February 1987 Quarter-final | St Flannan's College | 0-12 - 1-04 | Thurles CBS | St Ailbe's Park |
| | E Slattery 0-3, R McMahon 0-2, P Healy 0-2, T Canny 0-2, M McNamara 0-1, P Heffernan 0-1, F Tuohy 0-1. | | S Quinn 0-4, G O'Connor 1-0. |

| 25 February 1987 Quarter-final | North Monastery | 6-12 - 2-07 | De La Salle College Waterford | Canon Hayes Park |
| | D Hurley 2-2, A Goulding 1-3, D Kidney 1-1, F Wall 1-0, G Maguire 1-0, T Harte 0-2, B O'Sullivan 0-2, G Healy 0-2. | | J Lawlor 1-2, B Drohan 1-2, N Warren 0-2, A Qualter 0-1. |

| 25 February 1987 Quarter-final | Midleton CBS | 3-10 - 0-01 | Cashel CBS | Mitchelstown Grounds |
| | J Corcoran 1-7, P O'Brien 1-0, T Kelleher 1-0, J Dillon 0-2, J O'Connor 0-1. | | M Perdue 0-1. |

=== Semi-finals ===
| 8 March 1987 Semi-final | St Flannan's College | 2-14 - 1-05 | North Monastery | FitzGerald Park |
| | P Healy 1-3, T Canny 0-5, R McMahon 1-0, G Rogers 0-3, P Conlon 0-2, E Slattery 0-1. | | D Hurley 1-0, B O'Sullivan 0-2, G Maguire 0-2, P Cummins 0-1. |

| 8 March 1987 Semi-final | Midleton CBS | 3-07 - 3-07 | Limerick CBS | Dr Mannix Sportsfield |
| | D Quirke 2-4, P O'Brien 1-0, P McCarthy 0-1, G Scully 0-1, J Corcoran 0-1. | | M Hickey 1-3, D Considine 1-2, D O'Neill 1-0, D Noone 0-1, C Doolan 0-1. |

| 15 March 1987 Semi-final replay | Midleton CBS | 3-11 - 1-08 | Limerick CBS | Dr Mannix Sportsfield |
| | P O'Brien 1-4, J Corcoran 1-2, G Scully 1-0, D Quirke 0-3, B Barry 0-1, J O'Connor 0-1. | | M Hickey 0-4, W Enright 1-0, J Fitzgibbon 0-1, T Minihane 0-1, L O'Riordan 0-1, D Considine 0-1. |

=== Final ===
| 29 March 1987 Final | St Flannan's College | 3-12 - 2-06 | Midleton CBS | FitzGerald Park |
| | R McMahon 2-0, T Canny 0-5, P Hefernan 1-1, P Healy 0-4, J O'Gorman 0-1, N McNamara 0-1. | | J Corcoran 1-4, P O'Brien 1-0, J Dillon 0-1, B Barry. | Referee: G Long (Tipperary) |

== Statistics ==
=== Top scorers ===
| Rank | Player | County | Tally | Total | Matches | Average |
|---|---|---|---|---|---|---|
| 1 | Michael Hickey | Limerick CBS | 4-14 | 26 | 3 | 8.66 |
| 2 | John Corcoran | Midleton CBS | 3-14 | 23 | 4 | 5.75 |
| 3 | Tim Canny | St Flannan's College | 0-16 | 16 | 4 | 4.00 |
| 4 | Anthony Goulding | North Monastery | 4-03 | 15 | 3 | 5.00 |
| 5 | Donncha Hurley | North Monastery | 4-02 | 14 | 3 | 4.66 |
