= 1997 All-Ireland Senior Club Hurling Championship final =

1997 All-Ireland Senior Club Hurling Championship Final
- Event: 1996–97 All-Ireland Senior Club Hurling Championship
Athenry	Wolfe Tones
0-14	1-8
- Date: 17 March 1997
- Venue: Croke Park, Dublin
- Referee: Dickie Murphy (Wexford)
- Attendance: 34,852

The 1997 All-Ireland Senior Club Hurling Championship final was a hurling match played at Croke Park on 17 March 1997 to determine the winners of the 1996–97 All-Ireland Senior Club Hurling Championship, the 27th season of the All-Ireland Senior Club Hurling Championship, a tournament organised by the Gaelic Athletic Association for the champion clubs of the four provinces of Ireland. The final was contested by Athenry of Galway and Wolfe Tones of Clare, with Athenry winning by 0-14 to 1-8.

The All-Ireland final was a unique occasion as it was the first ever championship meeting between Athenry and Wolfe Tones. Both sides were hoping to make history by winning their first All-Ireland title.

A then record crowd of 34,852 saw Pat Higgins get Athenry off to a great start after just 15 seconds with a point from play. The corner forward quickly added two more points. Wolfe Tones' Derek Collins finished a long ball by Seán Power to the Athenry net. Two quick points from Paul Lee and Paul Keary bolstered the Munster champions during their best spell of the match. 19-year-old Eugene Cloonan collected a long ball from Paul Hardiman on the left wing and leveled matters after 22 minutes with a point from play. The Shannon side went ahead again with a point by Frank Lohan but another Eugene Cloonan point from a free had the sides level at the interval.

Cloonan opened the scoring in the second half with a point from a well taken '65' before adding another score from play. The Galway champions, despite their wastefulness, began to dominate. Another pressure point from a '65' by Cloonan and a volley by Aidan Poniard left the Tones facing a mountain to climb. The edged closer with free from Paul Keary, before Brian Higgins responded for Athenry. Cloonan added another point to give his side a four-point lead. Wolfe Tones reduced the deficit to three points, however, in spite of seventeen second-half wides, Athenry held on.

Athenry's victory secured their first All-Ireland title. They became the 19th club to win the All-Ireland title, while they were the fourth Galway representatives to claim the ultimate prize.

== Match ==
=== Details ===
17 March 1997

Athenry	0-14 - 1-8	Wolfe Tones
E Cloonan 0-9 (5f), C Moran 0-1, B Keogh 0-1, P Higgins 0-1, A Poinard 0-1, B Higgins 0-1.		P Keary 0-5 (5f), D Collins 1-0, P Lee 0-1, F Carrig 0-1, F Lohan 0-1.

Croke Park, Dublin
Attendance: 34,852
Referee: D Murphy (Wexford)

St. Mary's	Shannon
