= 1996–97 All-Ireland Senior Club Hurling Championship =

All-Ireland Senior Club Hurling Championship 1996–97
Championship Details
- Dates: 22 September 1996 – 17 March 1997
- Teams: 28

All Ireland Champions
- Winners: Athenry (1st win)
- Captain: Brian Feeney

All Ireland Runners-up
- Runners-up: Wolfe Tones na Sionna
- Captain: Brian Lohan

Provincial Champions
- Munster: Wolfe Tones na Sionna
- Leinster: Camross
- Ulster: Ruairí Óg
- Connacht: Athenry

Championship Statistics
- Top Scorer: Paul Flynn (3–21)

The 1996–97 All-Ireland Senior Club Hurling Championship was the 27th staging of the All-Ireland Senior Club Hurling Championship, the Gaelic Athletic Association's premier inter-county club hurling tournament. The championship ran from 22 September 1996 to 17 March 1997.

Sixmilebridge of Clare were the defending champions, however, they failed to qualify after being beaten by Wolfe Tones na Sionna in the quarter-finals of the 1996 Clare SHC. Boherlahan–Dualla of Tipperary, Wolfe Tones na Sionna of Clare and Young Irelands of Kilkenny made their championship debut.

The All-Ireland final was played at Croke Park in Dublin on 17 March 1997, between Athenry of Galway and Wolfe Tones na Sionna of Clare, in what was a first championship meeting between the teams. Athenry won the match by 0–14 to 1–08 to claim a first title.

Ballygunner's Paul Flynn was the championship's top scorer with 3–21.

== Results ==
=== Connacht Senior Club Hurling Championship ===
First round

| 5 October 1996 First round | Tubbercurry | 2–13 – 2–12 | Gortletteragh | Gortletteragh |
| | P Seevers 1–9, B Burke 1–1, K Walsh 0–2, D Killoran 0–1. | | T McLoughlin 0–7, S Duignan 1–1, S Mallon 1–0, T Ward 0–1, |

Quarter-final

| 19 October 1996 Quarter-final | Ballina Stephenites | 1–08 – 2–06 | Tubbercurry | James Stephens Park, Ballina |
| | N McLoughlin 0–4, J Regan 1–0, K Commons 0–3, K Guthrie 0–1. | | P Seevers 0–5, B Walsh 1–1, D Killoran 1–0. |

Semi-final

| 2 November 1996 Semi-final | Tubbercurry | 0–06 – 6–15 | Four Roads | Markievicz Park, Sligo |
| | P Seevers 0–6. | | R Mulry 2–1, A Lalwor 2–1, M Cunniffe 1–4, J Mannion 0–4, O Lohan 1–0, S Coyle 0–2, G Coyle 0–1, F Grehan 0–1, B Mannion 0–1. |

Final

| 8 December 1996 Final | Four Roads | 1–08 – 1–15 | Athenry | Ballyforan |
| | M Cunniffe 0–4, D Lohan 1–0, J Mannion 0–3, R Mulry 0–1. | | C Moran 0–6, P Higgins 1–2, B Keogh 0–3, B Hanley 0–2, A Poniard 0–1, D Moran 0–1. |

=== Leinster Senior Club Hurling Championship ===
Preliminary round

| 29 September 1996 Preliminary round | Wolfe Tones (Louth) | 1–03 – 1–03 | Wolfe Tones (Longford) | Drogheda Park, Drogheda |
| | T Crocoran 1–2, A Carter 0–1. | | J Lynn 1–3. |

| 6 October 1996 Preliminary round replay | Wolfe Tones (Longford) | 1–07 – 3–11 | Wolfe Tones (Louth) | Micahel Fay Park, Longford |
| | J Lynn 1–4, W Browne 0–1, B Connell 0–1, J Gilchrist 0–1. | | O Kelly 0–6, A Carter 1–1, D McCarthy 1–0, M Reynolds 1–0, E Downey 0–2, N McEnaney 0–1, T Corcoran 0–1. |

First round

| 13 October 1996 First round | Naomh Bríd | 0–09 – 1–01 | Glenealy | Dr. Cullen Park, Carlow |
| | J Kavanagh 0–4, J Nevin 0–2, D Quirke 0–1, B Maher 0–1, R Sheehan 0–1. | | T Byrne 1–0, J O'Neill 0–1. | Referee: P Direen (Offaly) |

| 13 October 1996 First round | Wolfe Tones (Louth) | 2–06 – 2–07 | Trim | Drogheda Park, Drogheda |

| 19 October 1996 First round | Lough Lene Gaels | 0–16 – 1–11 | Coill Dubh | Collinstown |
| | B Williams 0–7, F O'Farrell 0–3, J Williams 0–2, P Williams 0–1, J Gavigan 0–1, P Reilly 0–1, P Molloy 0–1. | | T Carew 0–5, D Anderson 1–0, C Byrne 0–3, N Casey 0–2, R Byrne 0–1. |

Quarter-finals

| 27 October 1996 Quarter-final | Trim | 0–04 – 1–24 | Seir Kieran | St. Loman's Park, Trim |
| | D Murray 0–3, R Fitzsimons 0–1. | | Johnny Dooley 0–9, M Coughlan 0–5, B Dooley 1–1, J Coakley 0–3, C Kelly 0–2, J Connors 0–2, S Dooley 0–1, Joe Dooley 0–1. | Referee: A Mac Suibhne (Dublin) |

| 27 October 1996 Quarter-final | Camross | 1–17 – 0–08 | Lough Lene Gaels | St. Fintan's GAA Grounds, Mountrath |
| | J Dollard 0–7, D Culleton 1–2, O Dowling 0–3, R Cuddy 0–2, P Hogan 0–1, M Collier 0–1, B Moore 0–1. | | B Williams 0–3, J Gavigan 0–2, P Williams 0–1, M Shaw 0–1, J Williams 0–1. | Referee: L Doyle (Wexford) |

| 27 October 1996 Quarter-final | Naomh Bríd | 1–10 – 3–17 | O'Toole's | Dr. Cullen Park, Carlow |
| | J Kavanagh 0–4, A Dowling 1–0, J Nevin 0–2, J Fitzpatrick 0–1, B Lawler 0–1, N Kane 0–1. | | J Brennan 0–11, P Donoghue 2–0, K Flynn 1–0, J Morris 0–2, M Dunne 0–2, E Morrissey 0–2. | Referee: P Dunphy (Kilkenny) |

| 3 November 1996 Quarter-final | Rathnure | 2–09 – 0–10 | Young Irelands | Nowlan Park, Kilkenny |
| | P Codd 1–2, M Morrissey 1–1, J Codd 0–2, C Byrne 0–1, M Byrne 0–1, R Guiney 0–1, A Codd 0–1. | | J McDermott 0–3, C Carter 0–3, B Treacy 0–2, DJ Carey 0–2. | Referee: P Delaney (Laois) |

Semi-finals

| 10 November 1996 Semi-final | Camross | 2–06 – 0–10 | Rathnure | Nowlan Park, Kilkenny |
| | M Collier 1–1, G Danne 1–0, J Dollard 0–3, O Dowling 0–1, PJ Cuddy 0–1. | | J Holohan 0–3, J Mooney 0–2, M Byrne 0–2, P Codd 0–2, A Codd 0–1. |

| 10 November 1996 Semi-final | Seir Kieran | 3–10 – 1–16 | O'Toole's | O'Moore Park, Portlaoise |
| | Johnny Dooley 1–7, M Mulrooeny 1–0, J Connors 1–0, K Dooley 0–1, N Coughlan 0–1, K Kelly 0–1. | | M Morrissey 1–6, J Brennan 0–6, M Dunne 0–1, K Flynn 0–1, P Benoughue 0–1, N Hearns 0–1. |

| 16 November 1996 Semi-final replay | Seir Kieran | 2–09 – 0–18 | O'Toole's | O'Moore Park, Portlaoise |
| | M Mulrooney 1–1, B Dooley 1–0, J Kealy 0–3, J Coakley 0–2, Joe Dooley 0–1, M Coughlan 0–1, K Dooley 0–1. | | J Brennan 0–9, E Morrissey 0–5, S Kearns 0–2, M Healy 0–1, P Donoghue 0–1. | Referee: P Ahearne (Carlow) |

Final

| 1 December 1996 Final | Camross | 1–12 – 2–05 | O'Toole's | Nowlan Park, Kilkenny |
| | J Dollard 0–7, PJ Cuddy 1–1, D Culleton 0–2, F Dowling 0–1, M Collier 0–1. | | D Morris 1–0, N Howard 1–0, E Morrissey 0–2, J Brennan 0–2, P Donoghue 0–1. | Referee: D Murphy (Wexford) |

=== Munster Senior Club Hurling Championship ===
Quarter-finals

| 12 October 1996 Quarter-final | Ballygunner | 1–18 – 0–11 | Na Piarsaigh | Walsh Park, Waterford |
| | P Flynn 1–12, M Mahony 0–2, D O'Sullivan 0–1, T Carroll 0–1, L Whitty 0–1, B O'Sullivan 0–1. | | Mark Mullins 0–7, Mickey Mullins 0–2, J. A. Moran 0–2. | Referee: W Barrett (Tipperary) |

| 13 October 1996 Quarter-final | Ballyheigue | 2–07 – 1–12 | Wolfe Tones | John Joe O'Sullivan Park, Ballyheigue |
| | B O'Sullivan 1–3, J Healy 1–1, M Slattery 0–2, L O'Mahony 0–1. | | Paul O'Rourke 1–2, P Keary 0–5, F Lohan 0–2, B Lohan 0–1, J Riordan 0–1, C O'Neill 0–1. | Referee: G Harrington (Cork) |

Semi-finals

| 10 November 1996 Semi-final | Boherlahan-Dualla | 1–13 – 2–16 | Ballygunner | Semple Stadium, Thurles |
| | A Flanagan 0–9, P O'Dwyer 1–0, B O'Dwyer 0–2, M Murphy 0–1, L Maher 0–1. | | M Mahony 1–3, P Flynn 0–5, D Codd 1–0, B O'Sullivan 0–3, T Carroll 0–2, L Whitty 0–1, F Hartley 0–1, P Power 0–1. | Referee: P O'Connor (Limerick) |

| 10 November 1996 Semi-final | Wolfe Tones | 1–11 – 0–09 | Patrickswell | Páirc na Sionna, Shannon |
| | Paul O'Rourke 0–4, C O'Neill 1–0, P Keary 0–3, P Lee 0–3, Pat O'Rourke 0–1. | | G Kirby 0–5, E Geary 0–2, A Carmody 0–1, N Carey 0–1. | Referee: W Barrett (Tipperary) |

Final

| 24 November 1996 Final | Wolfe Tones | 4–09 – 4–08 | Ballygunner | Semple Stadium, Thurles |
| | Paul O'Rourke 2–4, P Lee 1–2, F Carrig 1–1, P Keary 0–2. | Full video of match | P Flynn 2–4, P Power 1–1, G Ryan 1–1, B O'Sullivan 0–2. | Referee: P O'Connor (Limerick) |

=== Ulster Senior Club Hurling Championship ===
Semi-finals

| 22 September 1996 Semi-final | Keady Lámh Dhearg | 1–07 – 5–09 | Portaferry | Keady |
| | P McCormick 0-4, V Mone 1-0, G Mone 0-1, E McKee 0-1, R Murray 0-1. | | N Sands 3-3, J Convery 1-2, S McGrattan 1-2, S Murray 0-1, B Coleman 0-1, B Braniff 0-1. |

| 22 September 1996 Semi-final | Ruairí Óg Cushendall | 2–15 – 1–07 | Kevin Lynch's | Fr. Healy Park, Loughguile |
| | J Carson 0-8, Ruairí McNaughton 1-2, J McKillop 1-0, M McCambridge 0-2, T McNaughton 0-2, F McAillister 0-1. | | G McGonigle 1-7. |

Final

| 27 October 1996 Final | Ruairí Óg Cushendall | 3–09 – 2–08 | Portaferry | Casement Park, Belfast |
| | A Delargy 1-1, Conor McCambridge 0-4, Ruairi McNaughton 1-0, A McGuile 1-0, J Carson 0-2, T McNaughton 0-1, M McCambridge 0-1. | | N Sands 1-3, P Rodgers 1-0, B Coleman 0-1, G McGrattan 0-1, B Braniff 0-1, G Adair 0-1, J Convery 0-1. |

=== All-Ireland Senior Club Hurling Championship ===
Quarter-final

| 15 December 1996 Quarter-final | St. Gabriel's | 1–08 – 3–15 | Athenry | Emerald GAA Grounds, Ruislip |
| | M Lyons 0–4, B Hayes 1–0, D Quinlan 0–3, K Grogan 0–1. | | P Healy 2–1, B Hanley 1–3, C Moran 0–6, A Ponirad 0–2, J Rabbitte 0–2, B Keogh 0–1. |

Semi-finals

| 16 February 1997 Semi-final | Wolfe Tones | 2–08 – 1–10 | Ruairí Óg | Parnell Park, Dublin |
| | P Keary 1–2, D Collins 1–0, P O'Rourke 0–2, F Lohan 0–1, P O'Rourke 0–1, F Carrig 0–1, P Lee 0–1. | | C McCambridge 1–4, A Delargy 0–2, C McCambridge 0–1, M McCambridge 0–1, J Carson 0–1, R McNaughton 0–1. | Referee: D Murphy (Wexford) |

| 16 February 1997 Semi-final | Athenry | 4–17 – 3–03 | Camross | Semple Stadium, Thurles |
| | E Cloonan 1–9, D Moran 2–2, B Hanley 1–2, J Rabbitte 0–2, C Moran 0–2. | | J Dollard 1–2, O Dowling 1–1, D Culleton 1–0. | Referee: M Wadding (Waterford) |

Final

| 17 March 1997 Final | Athenry | 0–14 – 1–08 | Wolfe Tones | Croke Park, Dublin |
| | E Cloonan 0–9, B Higgins 0–1, P Higgins 0–1, C Moran 0–1, P Healy 0–1, A Poniard 0–1. | Report | P Keary 0–5, D Collins 1–0, P Lee 0–1, F Carrig 0–1, F Lohan 0–1. | Attendance: 34,852; Referee: D Murphy (Wexford) |

== Championship statistics ==
=== Top scorers ===
| Rank | Player | Club | Tally | Total | Matches | Average |
|---|---|---|---|---|---|---|
| 1 | Paul Flynn | Ballygunner | 3–21 | 30 | 3 | 10.00 |
| 2 | Jamesie Brennan | O'Toooles | 0–27 | 27 | 3 | 9.00 |
| 3 | Johnny Dooley | Seir Kieran | 2–16 | 22 | 3 | 7.33 |
| 3 | Paul Seevers | Tubbercurry | 1–19 | 22 | 3 | 7.33 |
| 3 | Joe Dollard | Camross | 1–19 | 22 | 4 | 5.50 |
| 6 | Paul O'Rourke | Wolfe Tones | 3–12 | 21 | 5 | 4.20 |
| 6 | Eugene Cloonan | Athenry | 1–18 | 21 | 2 | 10.50 |
| 8 | Paul Keary | Wolfe Tones | 1–17 | 20 | 5 | 4.00 |
| 9 | Noel Sands | Portaferry | 4–06 | 18 | 2 | 9.00 |
| 10 | Cathal Moran | Athenry | 0–15 | 15 | 4 | 3.75 |
