= 1984–85 Harty Cup =

Hurling tournament

1984–85 Dr Harty Cup
- Dates: 6 February – 24 March 1985
- Teams: 14
- Champions: North Monastery (17th title); Frank Horgan (captain)
- Runners-up: St Flannan's College; Kieran O'Neill (captain)

Tournament statistics
- Matches played: 13
- Goals scored: 58 (4.46 per match)
- Points scored: 170 (13.08 per match)
- Top scorer(s): Gilbert Murphy (6-01)

The 1984–85 Harty Cup was the 65th staging of the Harty Cup since its establishment in hurling by the Munster Council of Gaelic Athletic Association in 1918. The competition contested from 6 February to 24 March 1985.

St Finbarr's College unsuccessfully defended its title in the quarter-finals against St Flannan's College.

North Monastery won the Harty Cup final, 5–06 to 1–07, on 24 March 1985 at Dr Mannix Sportsfield in Charleville, against St Flannan's College, in what was their seventh successive meeting in the final overall with a hiatus from their last meeting in 1983. It was North Monastery's 17th successive Harty Cup title overall and a first title in 1981.

St Colman's College's Gilbert Murphy was the top scorer with 6-01.

== Results ==
=== First round ===
6 February 1985 First round	St Finbarr's College	4-06 - 0-04	Cashel CBS	Mitchelstown Grounds
	D O'Connell 1-4, A Tobin 1-0, M Sheehan 1-0, J O'Sullivan 1-0, B Harte 0-1, J McSweeney 0-1.		S Alley 0-1, D Quirke 0-1, P Shanahan 0-1, B Ryan 0-1.

6 February 1985 First round	Limerick CBS	1-06 - 3-07	Thurles CBS	St Ailbe's Park
	S Leo 1-1, J Prenderville 0-2, M Galligan 0-2, L O'Connor 0-1.		A Rossiter 2-1, M Burke 1-1, P Slattery 0-3, G Loughnane 0-1, P Cahill 0-1.

6 February 1985 First round	St Colman's College	5-06 - 0-02	Mayfield Community School	Páirc Bhríde
	G Murphy 4-0, J Beecher 1-0, J Tobin 0-3, A Coughlan 0-2, T Cooney 0-1.		J Galvin 0-2.

6 February 1985 First round	Coláiste Chríost Rí	1-06 - 2-07	Nenagh CBS	Fr Con Buckley Park
	F O'Brien 1-3, G O'Regan 0-1, R O'Mahony 0-1, K O'Keeffe 0-1.		N Cahill 1-1, M Nolan 0-4, M Gaynor 1-0, F Kirby 0-1, B Ryan 0-1.

6 February 1985 First round	St Flannan's College	3-09 - 2-03	Coláiste Iognáid Rís	Golden Grounds
	D McInerney 0-6, D Quinlan 1-1, P McInerney 1-1, R McMahon 1-0, P Guinnane 0-1.		S O'Leary 1-2, J Linehan 1-0, M Burns 0-1.

6 February 1985 First round	North Monastery	2-09 - 2-08	Roscrea CBS	Leahy Park
	G O'Riordan 1-3, F Horgan 1-0, K Cotter 0-3, K McGuckian 0-2, C Connery 0-1.		H Oakley 1-1, P Horgan 1-0, M Nolan 0-3, K Loughnane 0-1, J Fitzpatrick 0-1, D Fitzpatrick 0-1, J Daly 0-1.

=== Quarter-finals ===
20 February 1985 Quarter-final	De La Salle College Waterford	2-09 - 0-07	Templemore CBS	Leahy Park
	E Brennan 0-6, J Mullally 1-0, J French 1-0, L Hartley 0-1, P Hoban 0-1, B Sullivan 0-1.		M Ormonde 0-4, C Stakelum 0-1, B Burke 0-1, J Ryan 0-1.

20 February 1985 Quarter-final	St Colman's College	2-07 - 0-04	Thurles CBS	Fr Sheehy Park
	G Murphy 1-1, M O'Donnell 1-0, J Tobin 0-3, M Hennessy 0-2, J Beecher 0-1.		P Slattery 0-2, G Loughnane 0-1, P Cahill 0-1.

20 February 1985 Quarter-final	St Flannan's College	2-08 - 0-08	St Finbarr's College	St Ailbe's Park
	D McInerney 0-5, P Guinnane 1-1, P McInerney 1-0, P Healy 0-1, D Quinlan 0-1.		B Harte 0-4, D O'Connell 0-3, M Sheehan 0-1.

20 February 1985 Quarter-final	North Monastery	9-14 - 3-06	Nenagh CBS	Effin Grounds
	D O'Brien 4-2, P O'Neill 3-2, K McGuckian 0-5, F Horgan 1-1, R Feeney 1-0, E O'Riordan 0-2, T O'Keeffe 0-1, K Cotter 0-1.		M Nolan 0-4, E Kirby 1-0, M Heelan 1-0, N Cahill 1-0, L Ryan 0-1, M Gaynor 0-1.

=== Semi-finals ===
3 March 1985 Semi-final	North Monastery	5-09 - 2-07	De La Salle College Waterford	Leahy Park
	G O'Riordan 2-1, F Horgan 1-2, C Connery 0-4, P O'Neill 1-0, R Feeney 1-0, T O'Keeffe 0-2.		E Brennan 1-4, M Mahony 1-0, B Moran 0-1, J Mullally 0-1.

3 March 1985 Semi-final	St Flannan's College	1-04 - 1-03	St Colman's College	St Ailbe's Park
	D O'Neill 1-0, D McInerney 0-1, P McInerney 0-1, R McMahon 0-1, P Healy 0-1.		G Murphy 1-0, S McGrath 0-1, T Cooney 0-1, R O'Keeffe 0-1.

=== Final ===
24 March 1985 Final	North Monastery	5-06 - 1-07	St Flannan's College	Dr Mannix Sportsfield
	F Horgan 1-2, R Feeney 1-1, P O'Neill 1-1, K McGuckian 1-0, G O'Riordan 1-0, B Coutts 0-1, K Cotter 0-1.		D Quinlan 1-0, D McInerney 0-3, C O'Neill 0-3, D O'Neill 0-1.	Referee: S O'Grady (Limerick)

== Statistics ==
=== Top scorers ===
Rank	Player	County	Tally	Total	Matches	Average
1	Gilbert Murphy	St Colman's College	6-01	19	3	6.33
2	Paul O'Neill	North Monastery	5-03	18	4	4.50
3	Frank Horgan	North Monastery	4-05	17	4	4.25
4	Gerry O'Riordan	North Monastery	4-04	16	4	4.00
5	Declan McInerney	St Flannan's College	0-15	15	4	3.75
