= 1993 All-Ireland Junior Hurling Championship =

Championship Details
- Dates: 1 May - 18 July 1993

All Ireland Champions
- Winners: Clare (2nd win)
- Captain: Niall Romer

All Ireland Runners-up
- Runners-up: Kilkenny
- Captain: Charlie Carter
- Manager: Noel Skehan

Provincial Champions
- Munster: Clare
- Leinster: Kilkenny
- Ulster: Down
- Connacht: Not Played

The 1993 All-Ireland Junior Hurling Championship was the 72nd staging of the All-Ireland Junior Championship since its establishment by the Gaelic Athletic Association in 1912.

Wexford entered the championship as the defending champions, however, they were beaten by Kilkenny in the Leinster final.

The All-Ireland final was played on 18 July 1993 at Croke Park in Dublin, between Clare and Kilkenny, in what was their first ever meeting in the final. Clare won the match by 3–10 to 0–08 to claim their second championship title overall and a first title since 1914.

== Results ==
=== Leinster Junior Hurling Championship ===
==== Leinster first round ====
1 May 1993 First round	Kilkenny	2-13 - 2-05	Laois	Nowlan Park

5 May 1993 First round	Meath	2-09 - 1-11	Kildare	Athboy Sportsfield

==== Leinster quarter-finals ====
8 May 1993 Quarter-final	Carlow	1-11 - 2-06	Louth	Dr. Cullen Park

12 May 1993 Quarter-final	Kilkenny	3-28 - 2-03	Offaly	Nowlan Park

12 May 1993 Quarter-final	Meath	2-06 - 1-15	Wexford	St. Loman's Park

==== Leinster semi-finals ====
23 May 1993 Semi-final	Wexford	2-21 - 1-08	Carlow	Wexford Park

30 May 1993 Semi-final	Kilkenny	0-15 - 0-13	Dublin	Croke Park

==== Leinster final ====
16 June 1993 Final	Kilkenny	1-15 - 0-10	Wexford	Nowlan Park

=== Munster Junior Hurling Championship ===
==== Munster first round ====
23 May 1993 First round	Clare	4-07 - 1-10	Limerick	Cusack Park

26 May 1993 First round	Kerry	2-12 - 2-10	Waterford	Castle Grounds

==== Munster semi-finals ====
6 June 1993 Semi-final	Tipperary	2-13 - 3-10	Waterford	Semple Stadium

13 June 1993 Semi-final	Clare	1-09 - 0-09	Cork	Gaelic Grounds
	B McNamara 1-0, V Donnellan 0-3, T Kennedy 0-2, D Considine 0-1, B Quinn 0-1, C Chaplin 0-1, G Rodgers 0-1.		B Walsh 0-2, G Buckley 0-2, B Harte 0-2, L Meaney 0-1, J O'Mahony 0-1, A O'Driscoll 0-1.

27 June 1993 Semi-final replay	Waterford	3-12 - 1-10	Tipperary	Cappoquin Sportsfield

==== Munster final ====
7 July 1993 Final	Clare	2-15 - 0-10	Waterford	Semple Stadium

=== All-Ireland Junior Hurling Championship ===
==== All-Ireland semi-final ====
3 July 1993 Semi-final	Kilkenny	1-14 - 0-09	Galway	St. Brendan's Park

==== All-Ireland final ====
18 July 1993 Final	Clare	3-10 - 0-08	Kilkenny	Croke Park
	V Donnellan 2-4, C O'Neill 1-0, B McNamara 0-2, D Considine 0-2, P O'Rourke 0-1, B Quinn 0-1.		T Treacy 0-4, C Carter 0-3, T O'Keeffe 0-1.
