= 1996 Clare Senior Hurling Championship =

Annual hurling competition season

- Dates: 22 June – 6 October 1996
- Teams: 17
- Sponsor: Auburn Lodge
- Champions: Wolfe Tones na Sionna (1st title); Brian Lohan (captain); Alan Cunningham (manager)
- Runners-up: Clarecastle; Tom Howard (captain); John Callinan (manager)

Tournament statistics
- Matches played: 17
- Goals scored: 38 (2.24 per match)
- Points scored: 334 (19.65 per match)
- Top scorer(s): Mark McKenna (1-21)

The 1996 Clare Senior Hurling Championship was the 101st staging of the Clare Senior Hurling Championship since its establishment by the Clare County Board in 1887. The championship draw took place on 12 March 1996. The championship ran from 22 June to 6 October 1996.

Sixmilebridge entered the championship as the defending champions, however, they were beaten by Wolfe Tones na Sionna in the quarter-finals. Ogonnelloe joined the championship as Clare IHC winners from the previous year.

The final was played on 6 October 1996 at Cusack Park in Ennis, between Wolfe Tones na Sionna and Clarecastle, in what was their first ever meeting in the final. Wolfe Tones na Sionna won the match by 1–11 to 0–08 to claim their first ever championship title.

Scariff's Mark McKenna was the championship's top scorer with 1-21.

== Team changes ==
=== To Championship ===
Promoted from the Clare Intermediate Hurling Championship

- Ogonnelloe

=== From Championship ===
Regraded to the Clare Intermediate Hurling Championship

- Broadford

== Results ==
=== Preliminary round ===
22 June 1996 Preliminary round	O'Callaghan's Mills	1-14 - 0-03	Newmarket-on-Fergus	O'Garney Park
	B Madden 0-6, A Walsh 1-1, PJ O'Connell 0-4, T Canny 0-3.		B Enright 0-2, R Woods 0-1.

=== First round ===
13 July 1996 First round	Feakle	1-06 - 1-09	Tubber/Ruan	Cusack Park
	T Guilfoyle 1-1, V Donnellan 0-3, G Collins 0-1, H McMahon 0-1.		E Taaffe 0-5, D O'Brien 1-1, P Custy 0-1, M Daffy 0-1.

13 July 1996 First round	Inagh-Kilnamona	0-06 - 1-18	O'Callaghan's Mills	Cusack Park
	P McInerney 0-2, S Barry 0-1, P McGuane 0-1, B Fitzgerald 0-1, MJ Wynne 0-1.		A Walsh 0-5, B Madden 1-3, PJ O'Connell 0-2, D Cooney 0-2, K McNamara 0-2, T Canny 0-2, G Moroney 0-1, B Noonan 0-1.

14 July 1996 First round	Kilmaley	1-11 - 2-12	Sixmilebridge	Cusack Park
	B Healy 0-5, A Markham 1-0, M Daly 0-2, P Healy 0-2, C Clancy 0-2.		Danny Chaplin 1-1, G McInerney 0-4, N Gilligan 1-0, M Conlon 0-2, David Chaplin 0-2, C Chaplin 0-1, F Quilligan 0-1, J Chaplin 0-1.

20 July 1996 First round	Clarecastle	3-16 - 1-04	Tulla	Cusack Park
	V O'Loughlin 2-1, J Healy 1-3, K Ralph 0-3, A Neville 0-3, A Daly 0-2, R Fitzgerald 0-2, G O'Loughlin 0-1, F Tuohy 0-1.		P Tuohy 1-0, B Quinn 0-2, M Littleton 0-1, R McInerney 0-1.

20 July 1996 First round	Corofin	2-06 - 0-10	Cratloe	Cusack Park
	D Daly 1-2, J Clancy 1-0, O Nagle 0-2, M O'Dell 0-1, F Lahiniffe 0-1.		D Considine 0-6, N McMahon 0-2, D Ryan 0-1, S Ryan 0-1.

27 July 1996 First round	Wolfe Tones na Sionna	3-10 - 1-11	Ogonnelloe	Hamilton Park
	J O'Riordan 2-1, P Keary 0-6, D Collins 1-0, F Carrig 0-2, Paul O'Rourke 0-1.		J McKenna 0-6, F Forde 0-5, M Sheedy 1-0.

28 July 1996 First round	Whitegate	2-04 - 1-16	St Joseph's Doora-Barefield	Páirc an Dálaigh
	B Minogue 1-2, K Doyle 1-1, C Turner 0-1.		J O'Connor 1-7, F O'Sullivan 0-2, A Whelan 0-2, O Baker 0-2, J Considine 0-1, K O'Neill 0-1, M Baker 0-1.

28 July 1996 First round	Éire Óg	0-16 - 1-16	Scariff	Páirc an Dálaigh
	C Egan 0-8, B Keating 0-3, S McNamara 0-3, F Flynn 0-1, S Lyne 0-1.		M McKenna 0-10, T McMahon 1-1, B Murphy 0-3, D Murphy 0-2.

=== Quarter-finals ===
10 August 1996 Quarter-final	Corofin	0-02 - 0-14	O'Callaghan's Mills	Cusack Park
	J Cahill 0-1, O Nagle 0-1.		T Canny 0-5, B McNamara 0-5, K McNamara 0-2, M Deasy 0-2.

10 August 1996 Quarter-final	Tubber/Ruan	2-11 - 2-11	Scariff	Cusack Park
	E Taaffe 1-5, C Lyons 0-4, P Custy 1-0, M Daffy 0-1, D O'Brien 0-1.		M McKenna 1-7, B Murphy 1-3, J Horan 0-1.

17 August 1996 Quarter-final	Wolfe Tones na Sionna	3-09 - 1-07	Sixmilebridge	Cusack Park
	P Keary 1-6, D Collins 1-0, J O'Riordan 1-0, P Lee 0-2, Pat O'Rourke 0-1.		David Chaplin 1-0, J Chaplin 0-3, G McInerney 0-1, C Chaplin 0-1, M O'Halloran 0-1, D McInerney 0-1.

17 August 1996 Quarter-final	Clarecastle	2-08 - 1-09	St Joseph's Doora-Barefield	Cusack Park
	J Healy 1-5, G O'Loughlin 1-1, F Tuohy 0-1, A Daly 0-1.		J O'Connor 0-6, F O'Sullivan 1-0, K O'Neill 0-1, A Whelan 0-1, P Collins 0-1.

24 August 1996 Quarter-final replay	Tubber/Ruan	2-08 - 0-09	Scariff	Cusack Park
	D O'Brien 2-0, E Taaffe 0-4, C Lyons 0-3, D Quinn 0-1.		M McKenna 0-4, D Murphy 0-2, B Murphy 0-1, T McMahon 0-1, J Horan 0-1.

=== Semi-finals ===
7 September 1996 Semi-final	Wolfe Tones na Sionna	1-14 - 0-10	Tubber/Ruan	Cusack Park
	D Collins 1-3, P Keary 0-4, P Lee 0-3, J Riordan 0-2, F Lohan 0-1, Paul O'Rourke 0-1.		C Lyons 0-4, E Taaffe 0-3, D Quinn 0-1, M Daffy 0-1, M Clancy 0-1.

7 September 1996 Semi-final	Clarecastle	1-10 - 1-05	O'Callaghan's Mills	Cusack Park
	G O'Loughlin 1-1, J Healy 0-3, K Ralph 0-2, P Healy 0-1, S Sheedy 0-1, R Fitzgerald 0-1, V O'Loughlin 0-1.		A Walsh 1-1, B Madden 0-2, M Deasy 0-1, B McNamara 0-1.

=== Final ===
6 October 1996 Final	Wolfe Tones na Sionna	1-11 - 0-08	Clarecastle	Cusack Park
	D Collins 1-1, P Keary 0-3, Pat O'Rourke 0-2, Paul O'Rourke 0-2, P Meaney 0-1, F Carrig 0-1, P Lee 0-1.		G O'Loughlin 0-2, J Healy 0-2, K Ralph 0-1, A Neville 0-1, D Scanlan 0-1, R Fitzgerald 0-1.

== Championship statistics ==
=== Top scorers ===
Overall

Rank	Player	Club	Tally	Total	Matches	Average
1	Mark McKenna	Scariff	1-21	24	3	8.00
2	Paul Keary	Wolfe Tones	1-19	22	4	5.50
3	Éamonn Taaffe	Tubber/Ruan	1-17	20	4	5.00
4	James Healy	Clarecastle	2-13	19	4	4.75
5	Derek Collins	Wolfe Tones	4-04	16	4	4.00
5	Jamesie O'Connor	St Joseph's Doora-Barefield	1-13	16	2	8.00
7	Brian Madden	O'Callaghan's Mills	1-11	14	4	3.50
8	Andrew Walsh	O'Callaghan's Mills	2-07	13	4	3.25
9	John O'Riordan	Wolfe Tones	3-03	12	4	3.00
10	David O'Brien	Tubber/Ruan	3-02	11	3	3.66
10	Ger O'Loughlin	Clarecastle	2-05	11	4	2.75
10	Cyril Lyons	Tubber/Ruan	0-11	11	3	3.66

In a single game

Rank	Player	Club	Tally	Total	Opposition
1	Jamesie O'Connor	St Joseph's Doora-Barefield	1-07	10	Whitegate
1	Mark McKenna	Scariff	1-07	10	Tubber/Ruan
1	Mark McKenna	Scariff	0-10	10	Éire Óg
4	Paul Keary	Wolfe Tones	1-06	9	Sixmilebridge
5	Éamonn Taaffe	Tubber/Ruan	1-05	8	Scariff
5	James Healy	Clarecastle	1-05	8	St Joseph's Doora-Barefield
5	Cathal Egan	Éire Óg	0-08	8	Scariff
8	Victor O'Loughlin	Clarecastle	2-01	7	Tulla
8	John O'Riordan	Wolfe Tones	2-01	7	Ogonnelloe
