= 1989 All-Ireland Minor Hurling Championship =

All-Ireland Minor Hurling Championship 1989
Championship Details
- Dates: 19 April 1989 - 3 September 1989

All Ireland Champions
- Winners: Offaly (3rd win)
- Captain: Brian Whelehan
- Manager: Pat Moylan

All Ireland Runners-up
- Runners-up: Clare
- Captain: Paul Lee

Provincial Champions
- Munster: Clare
- Leinster: Offaly
- Ulster: Down
- Connacht: Galway

Championship Statistics
- Top Scorer: Johnny Dooley

The 1989 All-Ireland Minor Hurling Championship was the 59th staging of the All-Ireland Minor Hurling Championship since its establishment by the Gaelic Athletic Association in 1982. The championship began on 19 April 1989 and ended on 3 September 1989.

Kilkenny entered the championship as the defending champions, however, they were beaten by Offaly in the Leinster final.

On 3 September 1989, Offaly won the championship following a 2–16 to 1–12 defeat of Clare in the All-Ireland final. This was their third All-Ireland title overall and their first title since 1987.

Offaly's Johnny Dooley was the championship's top scorer.

== Results ==
=== Leinster Minor Hurling Championship ===
Quarter-finals

12 May 1989 Quarter-final	Offaly	1-15 - 0-04	Wexford	Nowlan Park, Kilkenny

Semi-finals

28 June 1989 Semi-final	Kilkenny	4-15 - 1-03	Laois	Dr. Cullen Park, Carlow
	D Lawlor 2-6, C Carter 1-2, J Lawlor 1-0, P O'Neill 0-2, C Phelan 0-1, N Maher 0-1, M Phelan 0-1, B Mason 0-1, S Prendergast 0-1.		B Peters 1-0, D Conroy 0-1, E Fennell 0-1, J Fitzpatrick 0-1.

28 June 1989 Semi-final	Offaly	0-17 - 1-04	Dublin	O'Moore Park, Portlaoise
	J Dooley 0-10, A Cahill 0-3, K Flynn 0-3, O O'Neill 0-1.		R Deegan 1-0, C Ring 0-2, G Regan 0-1, G Gregg 0-1.

Finals

9 July 1989 Final	Offaly	0-14 - 0-14	Kilkenny	Croke Park, Dublin
	J Dooley 0-10, A Cahill 0-2, B Whelehan 0-1, O O'Neill 0-1.		D Lawlor 0-7, M Phelan 0-2, C Phelan 0-1, C Carter 0-1, A Cleere 0-1, P O'Neill 0-1, P Brophy 0-1.

15 July 1989 Final replay	Offaly	4-13 - 0-13	Kilkenny	O'Moore Park, Portlaoise
	K Flynn 2-1, R Dooley 1-1, J Dooley 0-4, R McNamara 1-0, B Whelehan 0-3, S Grennan 0-2, A Cahill 0-2.		D Lawlor 0-5, C Carter 0-3, P O'Neill 0-3, K Corbett 0-1, M Phelan 0-1.	Referee: D Murphy (Wexford)

=== Munster Minor Hurling Championship ===
First round

19 April 1989 First round	Limerick	2-11 - 1-09	Waterford	Semple Stadium, Thurles
	PJ Garvey 1-4, A Ryan 1-1, M Moore 0-3, J Mulqueen 0-1, M Walsh 0-1, M Holland 0-1.		T Fives 0-7, S Daly 1-0, J Brenner 0-1, A Fitzgerald 0-1.	Referee: C Murphy (Kerry)

19 April 1989 First round	Clare	7-08 - 0-07	Cork	FitzGerald Park, Kilmallock
	C Clancy 2-0, P McNamara 1-3, J Leahy 1-0, P Keary 1-0 P O'Rourke 1-0, K Sammon 1-0, C Chaplin 0-2, P Minogue 0-1, G Cahill 0-1, P Markham 0-1.		F Lehane 0-3, B Corcoran 0-1, P Smith 0-1, A O'Brien 0-1, G Daly 0-1.	Referee: M Doyle (Tipperary)

Semi-finals

13 May 1989 Semi-final	Clare	3-13 - 1-04	Kerry	Cusack Park, Ennis
	P Keray 1-2, P McNamara 1-1, K Sammon 1-1, C Clancy 0-2, G Moroney 0-2, P O'Rourke 0-1, P Minogue 0-1, S Power 0-1, P Markham 0-1, J O'Gorman 0-1.		JJ O'Sullivan 1-0, P O'Connell 0-3, S Ryan 0-1.	Referee: T Lyons (Limerick)

17 May 1989 Semi-final	Limerick	2-07 - 1-08	Tipperary	Páirc Mac Gearailt, Fermoy
	T Magner 1-0, J Mulqueen 1-0, M Walsh 0-3, PJ Garvey 0-3, M Holland 0-1.		M Quinn 1-1, R Ryan 0-2, T Carroll 0-2, K Kennedy 0-2, V Ryan 0-1.	Referee: R Murphy (Cork)

Final

2 July 1989 Final	Clare	2-13 - 2-12	Limerick	Páirc Uí Chaoimh, Cork
	P Keary 0-7, P McNamara 2-0, P Minogue 0-4, P Markham 0-1, J O'Connor 0-1.		J Fitzgibbon 0-7, PJ Garvey 1-2, S O'Keeffe 1-0, M Moore 0-2, M Walsh 0-1.	Referee: G Long (Tipperary)

=== Ulster Minor Hurling Championship ===
Semi-final

25 June 1989 Semi-final	Derry	1-10 - 3-05	Antrim	Lavey
	M Collins 1-2, B McCormack 0-5, M Collins 0-2, M McKenna 0-1.		B Gillen 1-3, R Slane 1-1, R McDonnell 1-0, J Wilson 0-1.

Final

9 July 1989 Final	Down	2-11 - 3-08	Antrim	Athletic Grounds, Armagh
	B McGrattan 2-0, C Arthurs 0-4, S McAree 0-2, G Colgan 0-2, K Blaney 0-2, D Byrne 0-1		L McAllister 2-1, R McDonnell 1-1, J McCaffrey 0-2, B McGarry 0-1, B Gillen 0-1, R Slane 0-1, J Wilson 0-1.	Referee: M Ferguson (Fermanagh)

23 July 1989 Final replay	Down	3-08 - 2-08	Antrim	St. Tiernach's Park, Clones
	C Arthurs 2-1, M Trainor 0-4, N McVeigh 1-0, K Blaney 0-2, B Smyth 0-1.		A O'Neill 1-1, C McKiernan 1-1, B Gillen 0-3, R Donnelly 0-1, J Wilson 0-1, J McCaffrey 0-1.

=== All-Ireland Minor Hurling Championship ===
Semi-finals

6 August 1989 Semi-final	Galway	0-16 - 1-15	Clare	Croke Park, Dublin
	M Headd 0-7, M Donnellan 0-2, B Morrissey 0-2, F O'Brien 0-2, C Moran 0-2, M Curtin 0-1.		C Clancy 0-6, P Minogue 1-2, J Moroney 0-2, P McNamara 0-2, C Chaplin 0-1, D Sherlock 0-1, S Power 0-1.

13 August 1989 Semi-final	Offaly	1-11 - 1-05	Down	Croke Park, Dublin
	J Dooley 0-5, R McNamara 1-0, B Whelehan 0-3, R Dooley 0-2, S Grennan 0-1.		B Coulter 1-0, S McAree 0-2, D Byres 0-1, K Blaney 0-1, G McGrattan 0-1.	Referee: W Barrett (Tipperary)

Final

3 September 1989 Final	Offaly	2-16 - 1-12	Clare	Croke Park, Dublin
	J Dooley 0-8, N Hand 2-0, A Cahill 0-3, O O'Neill 0-3, R McNamara 0-1, R Dooley 0-1.		P Minogue 1-1, P Keary 0-3, P Markham 0-2, G Cahill 0-2, G Moroney 0-2, P O'Rourke 0-1, C Chaplin 0-1.	Referee: W Horgan (Cork)

== Statistics ==
Four men played for Offaly in both the 1989 All-Ireland MHC and 1989 All-Ireland Minor Football Championship finals: Finbarr Cullen, Seán Grennan, Kevin Flynn and Niall Hand.
