= 2021 Clare Senior Football Championship =

Jack Daly Cup 2021
- League: Clare GAA
- Sport: Gaelic Football
- Duration: 31 July – 7 November 2021
- Number of teams: 13
- Sponsor: Pat O’Donnell & Co.

Changes From 2020
- Promoted: St. Joseph's, Doora-Barefield
- Relegated: N/A

Changes For 2022
- Promoted: Corofin
- Relegated: Cooraclare & Kilrush Shamrocks

County Championship
- Winners: Éire Óg, Ennis (19th Title)
- Runners-up: Kilmurry-Ibrickane

The 2021 Clare Senior Football Championship was the 126th staging of the Clare Senior Football Championship since its establishment by the Clare County Board in 1887.

The 2020 champions, and holders of the Jack Daly Cup are Kilmurry-Ibrickane who won their sixteenth overall title after defeating Cratloe in a repeat of the 2016 final, also won by Kilmurry-Ibrickane.

In 2020 a decision was made to not relegate any team from any championship in Clare due to the Coronavirus Pandemic. As a result, there will be two teams relegated from senior level down to intermediate for 2022 in order to revert to the preferred twelve-team championship format.

== Senior Championship Fixtures ==
=== Group stage ===
- One group of five and two groups of four.
- 2020 semi-finalists are seeded and kept separate.
- Each team plays all the other teams in their group once. Two points are awarded for a win and one for a draw.
  - The top three teams from Group A and the top two teams from Groups B and C advance to Quarter-Finals
  - The third-placed teams from Groups B and C advance to ‘’Preliminary Quarter-Final’’
  - The three bottom-placed teams in each group contest Relegation Playoffs

==== Group A ====
Quarter-Final, Seeded Quarter-Final, Unseeded Relegation Playoff

Team	Pld	W	D	L	F	A	Diff	Pts
Kilmurry-Ibrickane	4	3	1	0	61	48	+13	7
St. Joseph's, Miltown Malbay	4	2	2	0	50	40	+10	6
Ennistymon	4	2	0	2	48	45	+3	4
Cratloe	4	1	1	2	50	55	-5	3
Cooraclare	4	0	0	4	42	63	-21	0

31 July 2021 Round 1	Kilmurry-Ibrickane	2-07 2-07	St. Joseph's, Miltown Malbay	Cusack Park, Ennis

1 August 2021 Round 1	Cooraclare	0-10 1-13	Cratloe	Cusack Park, Ennis

7 August 2021 Round 2	Cratloe	1-08 0-11	St. Joseph's, Miltown Malbay	Cusack Park, Ennis

7 August 2021 Round 2	Ennistymon	0-07 1-10	Kilmurry-Ibrickane	Cusack Park, Ennis

28 August 2021 Round 3	Cratloe	2-07 2-13	Kilmurry-Ibrickane	Cusack Park, Ennis

29 August 2021 Round 3	Cooraclare	0-10 2-11	Ennistymon	Cusack Park, Ennis

12 September 2021 Round 4	Cooraclare	1-12 1-13	Kilmurry-Ibrickane	Doonbeg

12 September 2021 Round 4	Ennistymon	0-09 0-12	St. Joseph's, Miltown Malbay	Cusack Park, Ennis

26 September 2021 Round 5	Cooraclare	0-07 3-05	St. Joseph's, Miltown Malbay	Quilty

26 September 2021 Round 5	Cratloe	1-07 3-06	Ennistymon	Cusack Park, Ennis

==== Group B ====
Quarter-Final, Seeded Quarter-Final, Unseeded Premliminary Quarter-Final Relegation Playoff

Team	Pld	W	D	L	F	A	Diff	Pts
St. Breckan's, Lisdoonvarna	3	3	0	0	43	27	+19	6
St. Joseph's, Doora-Barefield	3	2	0	1	59	35	+24	4
Kilmihil	3	1	0	2	36	50	-14	2
Kilrush Shamrocks	3	0	0	3	26	52	-26	0

31 July 2021 Round 1	Kilmihil	1-13 0-10	Kilrush Shamrocks	Cooraclare

31 July 2021 Round 1	St. Breckan's, Lisdoonvarna	3-08 0-09	St. Joseph's, Doora-Barefield	Corofin

28 August 2021 Round 2	Kilmihil	0-13 5-14	St. Joseph's, Doora-Barefield	Lissycasey

29 August 2021 Round 2	Kilrush Shamrocks	1-08 0-15	St. Breckan's, Lisdoonvarna	Cusack Park, Ennis

12 September 2021 Round 3	Kilmihil	0-07 0-11	St. Breckan's, Lisdoonvarna	Hennessy Park, Miltown Malbay

12 September 2021 Round 3	Kilrush Shamrocks	1-02 1-18	St. Joseph's, Doora-Barefield	Cusack Park, Ennis

==== Group C ====
Quarter-Final, Seeded Quarter-Final, Unseeded Premliminary Quarter-Final Relegation Playoff

Team	Pld	W	D	L	F	A	Diff	Pts
Éire Óg, Ennis	3	2	0	1	41	26	+15	4
Lissycasey	3	2	0	1	39	40	-1	4
Doonbeg	3	1	0	2	22	31	-9	2
Clondegad	3	1	0	2	31	36	-5	2

1 August 2021 Round 1	Clondegad	0-06 0-09	Doonbeg	Cusack Park, Ennis

1 August 2021 Round 1	Éire Óg, Ennis	3-10 0-09	Lissycasey	Cusack Park, Ennis

28 August 2021 Round 2	Clondegad	0-14 1-10	Éire Óg, Ennis	Cusack Park, Ennis

28 August 2021 Round 2	Doonbeg	0-10 2-10	Lissycasey	Kilmihil

11 September 2021 Round 3	Clondegad	1-08 0-14	Lissycasey	Cusack Park, Ennis

11 September 2021 Round 3	Doonbeg	0-03 0-09	Éire Óg, Ennis	Kilmihil

=== Preliminary Quarter-Final ===
- Played by two third-placed teams from Groups B and C

25 September 2021 Preliminary Quarter-Final	Doonbeg	0-11 1-09	Kilmihil	Cooraclare

=== Quarter-finals ===
- Played by top two placed teams from Groups A-C, third-placed team from Group A, and winners of Preliminary Quarter-Final
  - Losers move to Senior B Semi-Finals

9 October 2021 Quarter-Final	Éire Óg, Ennis	1-06 0-05	Ennistymon	Cusack Park, Ennis

9 October 2021 Quarter-Final	Kilmihil	0-13 1-13	Kilmurry-Ibrickane	Cusack Park, Ennis

10 October 2021 Quarter-Final	Lissycasey	1-13 0-10	St. Joseph's, Doora-Barefield	Cusack Park, Ennis

10 October 2021 Quarter-Final	St. Breckan's, Lisdoonvarna	3-11 0-12	St. Joseph's, Miltown Malbay	Cusack Park, Ennis

=== Semi-finals ===
23 October 2021 Semi-Final	Éire Óg, Ennis	0-11 0-05	St. Breckan's, Lisdoonvarna	Cusack Park, Ennis

24 October 2021 Semi-Final	Lissycasey	0-08 0-17	Kilmurry-Ibrickane	Cusack Park, Ennis

== County Final ==
7 November 2021 Final	Éire Óg, Ennis	1-11 0-09	Kilmurry-Ibrickane	Cusack Park, Ennis

Éire Óg, Ennis	Kilmurry-Ibrickane

== Other Fixtures ==
=== Relegation Playoffs ===
- Played by the three bottom-placed teams from Groups A-C
  - Losers of both Playoffs relegated to Intermediate for 2022

10 October 2021 Playoff 1	Clondegad	2-15 0-08	Cooraclare	Kilmihil

24 October 2021 Playoff 2	Clondegad	2-11 0-07	Kilrush Shamrocks	Cooraclare
