= 2011 Clare Senior Football Championship =

Annual gaelic football competition season

Jack Daly Cup 2011
- League: Clare GAA
- Sport: Gaelic Football
- Duration: 4 June - 16 October 2011
- Number of teams: 16
- Sponsor: Pat O’Donnell & Co.

Changes From 2010
- Promoted: St. Breckan's, Lisdoonvarna
- Relegated: O'Curry's, Doonaha

Changes For 2012
- Promoted: Clondegad
- Relegated: Kilmihil

County Championship
- Winners: Kilmurry-Ibrickane (12th Title)
- Runners-up: St. Joseph's, Doora-Barefield

The 2011 Clare Senior Football Championship was the 116th staging of the Clare Senior Football Championship since its establishment by the Clare County Board in 1887.

The defending champions and holders of the Jack Daly Cup were Doonbeg who won their 18th title in 2010.

== Senior Championship Fixtures ==
=== Group stage ===
- Four groups of four.
- Each team plays all the other teams in their group once. Two points are awarded for a win and one for a draw.
  - The top two teams in each group advance to Quarter-Finals
  - The four bottom-placed teams contest Relegation Playoffs

==== Group A ====
Quarter-Final, Seeded Quarter-Final, Unseeded Relegation Playoff

Team	Pld	W	D	L	F	A	Diff	Pts
Doonbeg	3	3	0	0	44	35	+9	6
Lissycasey	3	1	0	2	34	36	-2	2
Ennistymon	3	1	0	2	30	33	-3	2
Liscannor	3	1	0	2	29	33	-4	2

4 June 2011 Round 1	Doonbeg	1-13 - 3-05	Lissycasey	Cooraclare

5 June 2011 Round 1	Ennistymon	0-10 - 0-08	Liscannor	Hennessy Park, St. Joseph's, Miltown Malbay

13 August 2011 Round 2	Ennistymon	1-09 - 3-07	Doonbeg	Quilty

13 August 2011 Round 2	Liscannor	1-09 - 1-08	Lissycasey	Hennessy Park, St. Joseph's, Miltown Malbay

3 September 2011 Round 3	Liscannor	0-09 - 0-12	Doonbeg	Hennessy Park, St. Joseph's, Miltown Malbay

3 September 2011 Round 3	Lissycasey	0-09 - 0-08	Ennistymon	Cooraclare

==== Group B ====
Quarter-Final, Seeded Quarter-Final, Unseeded Relegation Playoff

Team	Pld	W	D	L	F	A	Diff	Pts
St. Senan's, Kilkee	3	2	0	1	44	35	+9	4
Cooraclare	3	2	0	1	46	34	+12	4
St. Breckan's, Lisdoonvarna	3	1	0	2	36	46	-10	2
Éire Óg, Ennis	3	1	0	2	37	48	-11	2

4 June 2011 Round 1	St. Breckan's, Lisdoonvarna	3-11 - 1-10	Éire Óg, Ennis	Páirc Finne, Corofin

6 June 2011 Round 1	St. Senan's, Kilkee	2-12 - 1-08	Cooraclare	Doonbeg

13 August 2011 Round 2	Éire Óg, Ennis	0-09 - 2-11	Cooraclare	Kilmihil

14 August 2011 Round 2	St. Senan's, Kilkee	3-06 - 2-03	St. Breckan's, Lisdoonvarna	Hennessy Park, St. Joseph's, Miltown Malbay

3 September 2011 Round 3	St. Breckan's, Lisdoonvarna	0-07 - 2-12	Cooraclare	Hennessy Park, St. Joseph's, Miltown Malbay

3 September 2011 Round 3	Éire Óg, Ennis	1-12 - 0-11	St. Senan's, Kilkee	Quilty

==== Group C ====
Quarter-Final, Seeded Quarter-Final, Unseeded Relegation Playoff

Team	Pld	W	D	L	F	A	Diff	Pts
Kilmurry-Ibrickane	3	3	0	0	43	22	+11	6
Wolfe Tones, Shannon	3	2	0	1	36	30	+6	4
Kilrush Shamrocks	3	1	0	2	27	39	-12	2
Kilmihil	3	0	0	3	24	34	-10	0

4 June 2011 Round 1	Kilmurry-Ibrickane	1-09 - 0-09	Kilmihil	Cooraclare

4 June 2011 Round 1	Wolfe Tones, Shannon	2-08 - 0-09	Kilrush Shamrocks	Lissycasey

13 August 2011 Round 2	Kilrush Shamrocks	0-07 - 1-14	Kilmurry-Ibrickane	Doonbeg

13 August 2011 Round 2	Wolfe Tones, Shannon	1-08 - 0-07	Kilmihil	Lissycasey

3 September 2011 Round 3	Kilmurry-Ibrickane	0-14 - 0-06	Wolfe Tones, Shannon	Lissycasey

3 September 2011 Round 3	Kilmihil	0-09 - 0-11	Kilrush Shamrocks	Cooraclare

==== Group D ====
Quarter-Final, Seeded Quarter-Final, Unseeded Relegation Playoff

Team	Pld	W	D	L	F	A	Diff	Pts
Cratloe	3	3	0	0	40	24	+16	6
St. Joseph's, Doora-Barefield	3	1	0	2	34	34	+4	2
Shannon Gaels, Labasheeda	3	1	0	2	33	40	-7	2
St. Joseph's, Miltown Malbay	3	1	0	2	23	32	-9	2

4 June 2011 Round 1	Cratloe	2-09 - 2-07	Shannon Gaels, Labasheeda	Cusack Park, Ennis

10 June 2011 Round 1	St. Joseph's, Doora-Barefield	1-07 - 1-08	St. Joseph's, Miltown Malbay	Kilmihil

14 August 2011 Round 2	St. Joseph's, Miltown Malbay	0-06 - 0-09	Shannon Gaels, Labasheeda	Kilmihil

14 August 2011 Round 2	Cratloe	1-09 - 0-05	St. Joseph's, Doora-Barefield	Shannon

3 September 2011 Round 3	St. Joseph's, Miltown Malbay	0-06 - 1-10	Cratloe	Cusack Park, Ennis

3 September 2011 Round 3	Shannon Gaels, Labasheeda	0-11 - 3-10	St. Joseph's, Doora-Barefield	Quilty

=== Quarter-finals ===
- Played by top two placed teams from Groups A-D, first place in each group kept separate.

17 Sept. 2011 Quarter-Final	Doonbeg	0-06 0-07	St. Joseph's, Doora-Barefield	Lissycasey

17 Sept. 2011 Quarter-Final	Kilmurry-Ibrickane	0-07 - 1-03	Cooraclare	Kilmihil

17 Sept. 2011 Quarter-Final	Cratloe	2-07 - 0-06	Lissycasey	Cusack Park, Ennis

25 Sept. 2011 Quarter-Final	St. Senan's, Kilkee	0-09 1-10 (R)	Wolfe Tones, Shannon	Kilmihil

=== Semi-finals ===
1 October 2011 Semi-Final	Kilmurry-Ibrickane	1-07 0-09	Cratloe	Lissycasey

2 October 2011 Semi-Final	St. Joseph's, Doora-Barefield	2-07 0-07	Wolfe Tones, Shannon	Cusack Park, Ennis

== County Final ==
16 October 2011 Final	Kilmurry-Ibrickane	0-17 0-05	St. Joseph's, Doora-Barefield	Cusack Park, Ennis
	Ian McInerney (0-08, 0-05f), Enda Coughlan (0-04, 0-02f), Johnny Daly (0-01f), Stephen Moloney (0-01), Noel Downes (0-01), Shane Hickey (0-01)		Colm Mullen (0-02, 0-01f), David O'Brien (0-02f), Enda Lyons (0-01)	Referee: Pat Cosgrove (Corofin)

Kilmurry-Ibrickane	St. Joseph's, Doora-Barefield

== Other Fixtures ==
=== Relegation Playoff ===
2 October 2011 Relegation Final	St. Joseph's, Miltown Malbay	1-15 0-11	Kilmihil	Quilty
