= 2022 Clare Senior Football Championship =

Jack Daly Cup 2022
- League: Clare GAA
- Sport: Gaelic Football
- Duration: 6 August - 30 October 2022
- Number of teams: 12
- Sponsor: Pat O’Donnell & Co.

Changes From 2021
- Promoted: Corofin
- Relegated: Cooraclare & Kilrush Shamrocks

Changes For 2023
- Promoted: Kildysart
- Relegated: Kilmihil

County Championship
- Winners: Éire Óg, Ennis (20th Title)
- Runners-up: Ennistymon

The 2022 Clare Senior Football Championship was the 127th staging of the Clare Senior Football Championship since its establishment by the Clare County Board in 1887.

The 2021 champions, and holders of the Jack Daly Cup were Éire Óg, Ennis who bridged a fifteen year gap from 2006 to win their nineteenth overall title. They defeated the reigning champions Kilmurry-Ibrickane by 1-11 to 0-09 in Cusack Park, Ennis.

The draws for the 2022 Clare club championships took place in April 2022.

== Senior Championship Fixtures ==
=== Group stage ===
- Three groups of four.
- 2021 semi-finalists are seeded and kept separate.
  - As there will be two 2021 semi-finalists in Group A, there will be an extra quarter-final place available.
  - A draw between the three second-placed teams in Groups A-C will determine the fourth seeded quarter-finalist.
- Each team plays all the other teams in their group once. Two points are awarded for a win and one for a draw.
  - The top three teams from Group A and the top two teams from Groups B and C advance to Quarter-Finals
  - The third-placed teams from Groups B and C advance to Preliminary Quarter-Final
  - The three bottom-placed teams in each group contest Relegation Playoffs

==== Group A ====
Quarter-Final, Seeded Quarter-Final, Unseeded Relegation Playoff

| Team | Pld | W | D | L | F | A | Diff | Pts |
|---|---|---|---|---|---|---|---|---|
| Éire Óg, Ennis | 3 | 3 | 0 | 0 | 50 | 35 | +15 | 6 |
| St. Breckan's, Lisdoonvarna | 3 | 2 | 0 | 1 | 42 | 32 | +10 | 4 |
| Corofin | 2 | 1 | 0 | 2 | 38 | 48 | -10 | 2 |
| St. Joseph's, Miltown Malbay | 3 | 0 | 0 | 3 | 39 | 54 | -15 | 0 |

| 6 August 2022 Round 1 | Corofin | 0-18 - 1-14 | St. Joseph's, Miltown Malbay | Cusack Park, Ennis |

| 6 August 2022 Round 1 | Éire Óg, Ennis | 0-13 - 0-12 | St. Breckan's, Lisdoonvarna | Cusack Park, Ennis |

| 20 August 2022 Round 2 | Corofin | 1-07 - 0-14 | St. Breckan's, Lisdoonvarna | Hennessy Park, Miltown Malbay |

| 21 August 2022 Round 2 | Éire Óg, Ennis | 3-11 - 0-13 | St. Joseph's, Miltown Malbay | Kilmihil |

| 3 September 2022 Round 3 | Corofin | 0-10 - 3-08 | Éire Óg, Ennis | Cusack Park, Ennis |

| 3 September 2022 Round 3 | St. Breckan's, Lisdoonvarna | 3-07 - 0-09 | St. Joseph's, Miltown Malbay | Ennistymon |

==== Group B ====
Quarter-Final, Seeded Premliminary Quarter-Final Relegation Playoff

| Team | Pld | W | D | L | F | A | Diff | Pts |
|---|---|---|---|---|---|---|---|---|
| Cratloe | 3 | 3 | 0 | 0 | 50 | 41 | +9 | 6 |
| Lissycasey | 3 | 2 | 0 | 1 | 48 | 40 | +8 | 4 |
| St. Joseph's, Doora-Barefield | 3 | 1 | 0 | 2 | 43 | 44 | -1 | 2 |
| Kilmihil | 3 | 0 | 0 | 3 | 36 | 52 | -16 | 0 |

| 6 August 2022 Round 1 | Cratloe | 2-10 - 0-14 | St. Joseph's, Doora-Barefield | Shannon |

| 7 August 2022 Round 1 | Kilmihil | 0-11 - 2-12 | Lissycasey | Cusack Park, Ennis |

| 20 August 2022 Round 2 | Cratloe | 1-13 - 1-08 | Kilmihil | Cusack Park, Ennis |

| 21 August 2022 Round 2 | Lissycasey | 2-08 - 1-08 | St. Joseph's, Doora-Barefield | Cusack Park, Ennis |

| 3 September 2022 Round 3 | Cratloe | 1-15 - 1-13 | Lissycasey | Cusack Park, Ennis |

| 4 September 2022 Round 3 | Kilmihil | 2-08 - 3-09 | St. Joseph's, Doora-Barefield | Cusack Park, Ennis |

==== Group C ====
Quarter-Final, Seeded Quarter-Final, Unseeded Premliminary Quarter-Final Relegation Playoff

| Team | Pld | W | D | L | F | A | Diff | Pts |
|---|---|---|---|---|---|---|---|---|
| Ennistymon | 3 | 2 | 0 | 1 | 35 | 32 | +3 | 4 |
| Kilmurry-Ibrickane | 3 | 2 | 0 | 1 | 36 | 34 | +4 | 4 |
| Clondegad | 3 | 2 | 0 | 1 | 36 | 35 | +1 | 4 |
| Doonbeg | 3 | 0 | 0 | 3 | 28 | 34 | -6 | 0 |

| 7 August 2022 Round 1 | Clondegad | 2-08 - 1-09 | Ennistymon | Cusack Park, Ennis |

| 7 August 2022 Round 1 | Doonbeg | 1-07 - 0-13 | Kilmurry-Ibrickane | Hennessy Park, Miltown Malbay |

| 20 August 2022 Round 2 | Ennistymon | 1-09 - 0-09 | Kilmurry-Ibrickane | Cusack Park, Ennis |

| 21 August 2022 Round 2 | Clondegad | 1-07 - 0-09 | Doonbeg | Cusack Park, Ennis |

| 4 September 2022 Round 3 | Clondegad | 1-09 - 1-11 | Kilmurry-Ibrickane | Cusack Park, Ennis |

| 4 September 2022 Round 3 | Doonbeg | 0-09 - 1-08 | Ennistymon | Hennessy Park, Miltown Malbay |

=== Preliminary Quarter-Final ===
- Played by two third-placed teams from Groups B and C

| 18 September 2022 Preliminary Quarter-Final | Clondegad | 1-15 - 0-08 | St. Joseph's, Doora-Barefield | Cusack Park, Ennis |

=== Quarter-finals ===
- Played by top two placed teams from Groups A-C, third-placed team from Group A, and winners of Preliminary Quarter-Final

| 1 October 2022 Quarter-Final | Cratloe | 1-13 - 3-13 | Kilmurry-Ibrickane | Cusack Park, Ennis |

| 1 October 2022 Quarter-Final | Ennistymon | 1-07 - 0-09 | St. Breckan's, Lisdoonvarna | Cusack Park, Ennis |

| 2 October 2022 Quarter-Final | Clondegad | 0-11 - 2-11 | Éire Óg, Ennis | Cusack Park, Ennis |

| 2 October 2022 Quarter-Final | Corofin | 1-19 - 0-16 | Lissycasey | Cusack Park, Ennis |

=== Semi-finals ===
| 15 October 2022 Semi-Final | Ennistymon | 2-08 - 1-11 (AET); Ennistymon won 4-3 on penalties | Kilmurry-Ibrickane | Cusack Park, Ennis |

| 16 October 2022 Semi-Final | Corofin | 0-03 - 1-11 | Éire Óg, Ennis | Cusack Park, Ennis |

== County Final ==
| 30 October 2022 Final | Éire Óg, Ennis | 0-09 - 0-06 | Ennistymon | Cusack Park, Ennis |
| | | Report | | Attendance: 4,608; Referee: Chris Maguire (Wolfe Tones) |

| Éire Óg, Ennis | Ennistymon |

== Other Fixtures ==
=== Relegation Playoffs ===
- Played by the three bottom-placed teams from Groups A-C
  - Loser of Playoff 2 relegated to Intermediate for 2023

| 17 September 2022 Playoff 1 | Doonbeg | 2-19 - 1-16 (AET) | St. Joseph's, Miltown Malbay | Cooraclare |

| 1 October 2022 Playoff 2 | Kilmihil | 5-06 - 4-15 | St. Joseph's, Miltown Malbay | Doonbeg |
