= 2017 Clare Senior Football Championship =

Jack Daly Cup 2017
- League: Clare GAA
- Sport: Football
- Duration: 17 June - 29 October 2017
- Number of teams: 16
- Sponsor: Pat O’Donnell & Co.

Changes From 2016
- Promoted: Kilfenora
- Relegated: Kilrush Shamrocks

Changes For 2018
- Promoted: Kilmihil
- Relegated: St. Senan's, Kilkee

County Championship
- Winners: Kilmurry-Ibrickane (15th Title)
- Runners-up: Clondegad

Senior B Championship
- Winners: Lissycasey

The 2017 Clare Senior Football Championship was the 122nd staging of the Clare Senior Football Championship since its establishment by the Clare County Board in 1887.

The defending champions were Kilmurry-Ibrickane who had won their fourteenth overall title in 2016.

== Senior Championship Fixtures/Results ==
=== First round ===
- Eight winners advance to Round 2A (winners)
- Eight losers move to Round 2B (Losers)

17 June 2017 Round 1	Doonbeg	1-10 - 0-11	St. Joseph's, Miltown Malbay	Kilmihil
		av

17 June 2017 Round 1	Kilfenora	0-09 - 1-09	O'Curry's, Doonaha	Hennessy Park, Miltown Malbay

17 June 2017 Round 1	Kilmurry-Ibrickane	4-17 - 0-02	Wolfe Tones, Shannon	Lissycasey

18 June 2017 Round 1	Clondegad	1-17 - 0-09	St. Senan's, Kilkee	Cooraclare

18 June 2017 Round 1	Cooraclare	0-15 - 1-09	St. Breckan's, Lisdoonvarna	Ennistymon

18 June 2017 Round 1	Corofin	1-03 - 3-10	Éire Óg, Ennis	Cusack Park, Ennis

18 June 2017 Round 1	Cratloe	1-16 - 0-10	Ennistymon	Gurteen

18 June 2017 Round 1	Lissycasey	1-12 - 1-06	St. Joseph's, Doora-Barefield	Cusack Park, Ennis

=== Second round ===
==== A. Winners ====
- Played by eight winners of Round 1
  - Four winners advance to Quarter-finals
  - Four losers move to Round 3

19 August 2017 Round 2A	Clondegad	0-15 - 1-12 (AET)	Lissycasey	Cooraclare

19 August 2017 Round 2A	Cooraclare	0-13 - 1-12	Doonbeg	Quilty

19 August 2017 Round 2A	Cratloe	2-17 - 0-08	Éire Óg, Ennis	Shannon

19 August 2017 Round 2A	Kilmurry-Ibrickane	1-15 - 0-09	O'Curry's, Doonaha	Doonbeg

2 September 2017 Round 2A (Replay)	Clondegad	1-10 - 1-07	Lissycasey	Cooraclare

==== B. Losers ====
- Played by eight losers of Round 1
  - Four winners move to Round 3

19 August 2017 Round 2B	Corofin	1-13 - 0-10	Wolfe Tones, Shannon	Gurteen

19 August 2017 Round 2B	Kilfenora	0-09 - 2-12	St. Joseph's, Doora-Barefield	Corofin

20 August 2017 Round 2B	Ennistymon	2-13 - 0-08	St. Senan's, Kilkee	Cooraclare

20 August 2017 Round 2B	St. Breckan's, Lisdoonvarna	0-07 - 1-13	St. Joseph's, Miltown Malbay	Ennistymon

=== Third round ===
- Played by four losers of Round 2A & four winners of Round 2B
  - Four winners advance to Quarter-finals

2 September 2017 Round 3	Corofin	1-04 - 1-09	Éire Óg, Ennis	Gurteen

2 September 2017 Round 3	Doonbeg	2-10 - 2-04	St. Joseph's, Doora-Barefield	Hennessy Park, Miltown Malbay

2 September 2017 Round 3	O'Curry's, Doonaha	5-04 - 6-17	St. Joseph's, Miltown Malbay	Doonbeg

16 September 2017 Round 3	Ennistymon	3-09 - 1-13	Lissycasey	Cusack Park, Ennis

=== Quarter-finals ===
- Played by four winners of Round 2A and four winners of Round 3

16 September 2017; 2:30 pm Quarter-final	Clondegad	0-10 - 1-07 (AET)	Doonbeg	Kilmihil; Referee: John Hannon (Michael Cusack's, Carron); Man of the Match: David Tubridy
16 September 2017; 2:30 pm Quarter-final	Gary Brennan 0-5 (0-4f), Podge McMahon 0-4f, Eoghan Donnellan 0-1		David Tubridy 0-6 (0-3f), Paul Dillon 1-0, Shane Ryan 0-1	Kilmihil; Referee: John Hannon (Michael Cusack's, Carron); Man of the Match: David Tubridy

30 September 2017; 5:00 pm Quarter-final (Replay)	Clondegad	1-11 - 0-11	Doonbeg	Kilmihil; Referee: Pat Cosgrove (Corofin); Man of the Match: Tony Kelly

16 September 2017; 5:45 pm Quarter-final	Cooraclare	0-12 - 1-12	St. Joseph's, Miltown Malbay	Doonbeg; Referee: Rory Hickey (Éire Óg, Ennis); Man of the Match: Eoin Cleary
16 September 2017; 5:45 pm Quarter-final	Pearse Lillis 0-3 (0-2f), Killian Roche (0-2f), John Looney (0-2f), Jack Morrissey (0-1f) 0-2 each, Conor Marrinan, Thomas Downes, Cathal Lillis (0-1f) 0-1 each		Eoin Cleary 0-7 (0-3f), Cormac Murray 1-0, Conor Cleary (0-1f) and Gearoid Curtin 0-2, David Cleary 0-1	Doonbeg; Referee: Rory Hickey (Éire Óg, Ennis); Man of the Match: Eoin Cleary

16 September 2017; 4:00 pm Quarter-final	Éire Óg, Ennis	0-08 - 0-12	Kilmurry-Ibrickane	Kilmihil; Referee: Damian Fox (Clooney-Quin); Man of the Match: Martin McMahon
16 September 2017; 4:00 pm Quarter-final	Shane Daniels 0-5 (0-5f), Conall Ó hAiniféin 0-2, Danny Russell 0-1		Keelan Sexton 0-6 (0-5f), Ian McInerney 0-3 (0-3f), Dermot Coughlan, Michael O'Dwyer, Noel Downes 0-1 each	Kilmihil; Referee: Damian Fox (Clooney-Quin); Man of the Match: Martin McMahon

30 September 2017; 3:00 pm Quarter-final	Cratloe	3-13 - 1-10	Ennistymon	Cusack Park, Ennis; Referee: John Hannon (Michael Cusack's, Carron); Man of the Match: Conor McGrath
30 September 2017; 3:00 pm Quarter-final	Cathal McInerney 1-6 (0-4f), Podge Collins 1-2, Billy Connors 1-0, John Galvin 0-2, Liam Markham, Shane Gleeson, Conor McGrath 0-1 each		Joe Dowling 0-6 (0-3f), Danny Rouine 1-0, Joey Rouine 0-2, Sean McConigley 0-1	Cusack Park, Ennis; Referee: John Hannon (Michael Cusack's, Carron); Man of the Match: Conor McGrath

=== Semi-finals ===
14 October 2017; 4:00 pm Semi-final	Cratloe	2-09 - 2-10 (AET)	Kilmurry-Ibrickane	Cusack Park, Ennis; Referee: Rory Hickey (Éire Óg, Ennis); Man of the Match: Dermot Coughlan
14 October 2017; 4:00 pm Semi-final	Cathal McInerney 1-5 (1-0 pen, 0-4f), Rian Considine 1-0, Sean Collins 0-2, Shane Gleeson and Podge Collins 0-1 each		Niall Hickey 1-1, Keith King 1-0, Keelan Sexton 0-3 (0-2f), Ian McInerney (0-2f) and Michael Hogan 0-2 each, Dermot Coughlan and Peter O'Dwyer 0-1 each	Cusack Park, Ennis; Referee: Rory Hickey (Éire Óg, Ennis); Man of the Match: Dermot Coughlan

15 October 2017; 12:30 pm Semi-final	Clondegad	2-12 - 1-09	St. Joseph's, Miltown Malbay	Cooraclare; Referee: Fergal Gray (Feakle); Man of the Match: Podge McMahon
15 October 2017; 12:30 pm Semi-final	Podge McMahon 1-4 (0-2f), Gearoid O'Connell 1-1, James Murphy 0-2, Brian Carrigg, Gary Brennan (0-1f), Tony Kelly, Eoghan Donnellan, Shane Brennan 0-1 each		Eoin Cleary 1-2 (0-1f), Kieran Malone and Kevin Keavey 0-2 each, David Cleary, Cormac Murray, Eoin Curtin 0-1 each	Cooraclare; Referee: Fergal Gray (Feakle); Man of the Match: Podge McMahon

== County Final ==
29 October 2017; 3:00 pm Final	Clondegad	0-14 - 1-14	Kilmurry-Ibrickane	Cusack Park, Ennis; Attendance: 4,916; Referee: Pat Cosgrove (Corofin); Man of the Match: Enda Coughlan
29 October 2017; 3:00 pm Final	Podge McMahon 0-4 (0-3f), Tony Kelly 0-3, Gary Brennan (0-1f) and Eoghan Donnellan 0-2 each, Tadhg Lynch, Gearoid O'Connell, Shane Brennan 0-1 each	Report	Keelan Sexton 0-4 (0-2f), I McInerney (0-3f) 0-3f, Peter O'Dwyer 1-0, Stephen Moloney and Noel Downes 0-2 each, Darragh Sexton, Dermot Coughlan, Michael O'Dwyer 0-1 each	Cusack Park, Ennis; Attendance: 4,916; Referee: Pat Cosgrove (Corofin); Man of the Match: Enda Coughlan

Clondegad	Kilmurry-Ibrickane

== Other Fixtures ==
=== Relegation Playoff ===
16 Sept. 2017 Relegation Final	Wolfe Tones, Shannon	2-06 - 0-11	St. Senan's, Kilkee	Ennistymon
