= 2012 Clare Senior Football Championship =

Jack Daly Cup 2012
- League: Clare GAA
- Sport: Gaelic Football
- Duration: 03 August – 21 October 2012
- Teams: 16
- Sponsor: Pat O’Donnell & Co.

Changes From 2011
- Promoted: Clondegad
- Relegated: Kilmihil

Changes For 2013
- Promoted: O'Curry's, Doonaha
- Relegated: St. Joseph's, Miltown Malbay

County Championship
- Winners: Kilmurry Ibrickane (1st Title)
- Runners-up: St. Joseph's, Doora-Barefield

The 2012 Clare Senior Football Championship was the 117th staging of the Clare Senior Football Championship since its establishment by the Clare County Board in 1887.

The defending champions and holders of the Jack Daly Cup were Kilmurry-Ibrickane who won their 13th title in 2011.

== Senior Championship Fixtures/Results ==
=== First round ===
- Eight winners advance to Round 2A (winners)
- Eight losers move to Round 2B (Losers)

4 August 2012 Round 1	Liscannor	2-09 - 2-08	Wolfe Tones, Shannon	Gurteen

4 August 2012 Round 1	Ennistymon	0-13 - 0-03	St. Joseph's, Miltown Malbay	Cusack Park, Ennis

4 August 2012 Round 1	Cooraclare	0-11 - 1-03	St. Joseph's, Doora-Barefield	Lissycasey

4 August 2012 Round 1	Shannon Gaels, Labasheeda	2-07 - 0-10	St. Senan's, Kilkee	Cooraclare

4 August 2012 Round 1	Doonbeg	0-10 - 0-07	Lissycasey	Cooraclare

5 August 2012 Round 1	Éire Óg, Ennis	2-06 - 1-05	Kilrush Shamrocks	Kilmihil

6 August 2012 Round 1	Clondegad	1-11 - 2-07	St. Breckan's, Lisdoonvarna	Corofin

10 August 2012 Round 1	Kilmurry-Ibrickane	0-17 - 0-09 (R)	Cratloe	Clarecastle

=== Second round ===
==== A. Winners ====
- Played by eight winners of Round 1
  - Four winners advance to Quarter-finals
  - Four losers move to Round 3

18 August 2012 Round 2A	Cooraclare	0-13 - 0-08	Shannon Gaels, Labasheeda	Doonbeg

18 August 2012 Round 2A	Ennistymon	1-15 - 1-06	Liscannor	Hennessy Park, Miltown Malbay

19 August 2012 Round 2A	Clondegad	3-09 - 2-14	Doonbeg	Kilmihil

26 August 2012 Round 2A	Éire Óg, Ennis	0-06 - 2-06	Kilmurry-Ibrickane	Kilmihil

==== B. Losers ====
- Played by eight losers of Round 1
  - Four winners move to Round 3
  - Four losers divert to Relegation Play-offs

18 August 2012 Round 2B	St. Joseph's, Doora-Barefield	0-12 - 0-08	St. Senan's, Kilkee	Kilmihil

19 August 2012 Round 2B	St. Breckan's, Lisdoonvarna	1-10 - 2-09 (AET)	Wolfe Tones, Shannon	Corofin

19 August 2012 Round 2B	St. Joseph's, Miltown Malbay	1-08 - 0-12	Kilrush Shamrocks	Cooraclare

30 August 2012 Round 2B	Cratloe	0-13 - 0-07	Lissycasey	Clarecastle

=== Third round ===
- Played by four losers of Round 2A & four winners of Round 2B
  - Four winners advance to Quarter-finals
  - Four losers divert to Senior B Championship

24 August 2012 Round 3	Kilrush Shamrocks	1-10 1-07 (AET)	Shannon Gaels, Labasheeda	Cooraclare

26 August 2012 Round 3	St. Joseph's, Doora-Barefield	0-08 0-06	Clondegad	Lissycasey

03 Sept. 2012 Round 3	Wolfe Tones, Shannon	1-06 2-17	Éire Óg, Ennis	Gurteen

19 Sept. 2012 Round 3	Liscannor	0-12 - 0-14 (AET)	Cratloe	Cooraclare

=== Quarter-finals ===
- Played by four winners of Round 2A and four winners of Round 3

22 Sept. 2012 Quarter-final	Kilrush Shamrocks	1-08 0-06	Ennistymon	Quilty

22 Sept. 2012 Quarter-final	St. Joseph's, Doora-Barefield	1-12 - 0-06	Cooraclare	Labasheeda

23 Sept. 2012 Quarter-final	Kilmurry-Ibrickane	1-15 0-03	Cratloe	Cusack Park, Ennis

30 Sept. 2012 Quarter-final	Doonbeg	2-08 1-09 (R)	Éire Óg, Ennis	Hennessy Park, Miltown Malbay

=== Semi-finals ===
07 October 2012 Semi-final	St. Joseph's, Doora-Barefield	0-07 0-06	Doonbeg	Hennessy Park, Miltown Malbay

13 October 2012 Semi-final	Kilrush Shamrocks	3-01 - 0-11 (R)	Kilmurry-Ibrickane	Doonbeg

== County final ==
21 October 2012 Final	Kilmurry-Ibrickane	0-10 0-04	St. Joseph's, Doora-Barefield	Cusack Park, Ennis

Kilmurry-Ibrickane	St. Joseph's, Doora-Barefield

== Other Fixtures ==
=== Relegation Playoff ===
13 October 2012 Relegation Final	St. Joseph's, Miltown Malbay	0-08 - 1-07 (R)	Lissycasey	Cooraclare
