= 2014 Clare Senior Football Championship =

Gaelic football competition in Ireland

Jack Daly Cup 2014
- League: Clare GAA
- Sport: Gaelic Football
- Duration: 26 July - 12 October 2014
- Number of teams: 16
- Sponsor: Pat O’Donnell & Co.

Changes From 2013
- Promoted: St. Joseph's, Miltown Malbay
- Relegated: St. Breckan's, Lisdoonvarna

Changes For 2015
- Promoted: Wolfe Tones, Shannon
- Relegated: Liscannor

County Championship
- Winners: Cratloe(2nd Title)
- Runners-up: Éire Óg, Ennis

The 2014 Clare Senior Football Championship was the 119th staging of the Clare Senior Football Championship since its establishment by the Clare County Board in 1887.

The defending champions and holders of the Jack Daly Cup were Cratloe who won their maiden title in 2013.

== Senior Championship Fixtures/Results ==
=== First round ===
- Eight winners advance to Round 2A (winners)
- Eight losers move to Round 2B (Losers)

26 July 2014 Round 1	St. Joseph's, Doora-Barefield	0-09 - 0-06	Shannon Gaels, Labasheeda	Lissycasey

26 July 2014 Round 1	O'Curry's, Doonaha	0-05 - 0-09	St. Joseph's, Miltown Malbay	Doonbeg

26 July 2014 Round 1	Kilmurry-Ibrickane	0-09 - 0-10	St. Senan's, Kilkee	Doonbeg

26 July 2014 Round 1	Clondegad	2-12 0-10	St. Breckan's, Lisdoonvarna	Cusack Park, Ennis

26 July 2014 Round 1	Doonbeg	2-15 - 0-05	Ennistymon	Hennessy Park, Miltown Malbay

26 July 2014 Round 1	Éire Óg, Ennis	1-12 2-12	Cratloe	Cusack Park, Ennis

27 July 2014 Round 1	Cooraclare	1-15 - 0-06	Kilrush Shamrocks	Labasheeda

27 July 2014 Round 1	Lissycasey	0-13 - 0-07	Liscannor	Cooraclare

=== Second round ===
==== A. Winners ====
- Played by eight winners of Round 1
  - Four winners advance to Quarter-finals
  - Four losers move to Round 3

9 August 2014 Round 2A	St. Joseph's, Miltown Malbay	3-12 - 0-06	St. Senan's, Kilkee	Cooraclare

9 August 2014 Round 2A	Clondegad	2-10 - 0-11	Lissycasey	Cusack Park, Ennis

9 August 2014 Round 2A	Doonbeg	0-14 - 0-06	St. Joseph's, Doora-Barefield	Kilmihil

10 August 2014 Round 2A	Cratloe	1-08 - 1-04	Cooraclare	Clarecastle

==== B. Losers ====
- Played by eight losers of Round 1
  - Four winners move to Round 3
  - Four losers divert to Relegation Play-offs

9 August 2014 Round 2B	Kilmurry-Ibrickane	1-13 - 0-03	Shannon Gaels, Labasheeda	Kilmihil

10 August 2014 Round 2B	Kilrush Shamrocks	0-08 - 1-06	O'Curry's, Doonaha	Doonbeg

10 August 2014 Round 2B	Éire Óg, Ennis	2-12 - 0-06	Liscannor	Corofin

10 August 2014 Round 2B	Ennistymon	2-14 - 0-06	St. Breckan's, Lisdoonvarna	Corofin

=== Third round ===
- Played by four losers of Round 2A & four winners of Round 2B
  - Four winners advance to Quarter-finals
  - Four losers divert to Senior B Championship

23 August 2014 Round 3	Ennistymon	1-03 - 2-13	Cooraclare	Quilty

24 August 2014 Round 3	Éire Óg, Ennis	3-16 0-08	Lissycasey	Cusack Park, Ennis

24 August 2014 Round 3	O'Curry's, Doonaha	2-12 - 0-16 (AET)	St. Joseph's, Doora-Barefield	Kilmihil

24 August 2014 Round 3	Kilmurry-Ibrickane	0-16 - 1-09	St. Senan's, Kilkee	Doonbeg

=== Quarter-finals ===
- Played by four winners of Round 2A and four winners of Round 3

06 Sept. 2014 Quarter-final	O'Curry's, Doonaha	1-09 - 0-16	Cratloe	Lissycasey

07 Sept. 2014 Quarter-final	Doonbeg	0-08 - 1-07	Cooraclare	Quilty

13 Sept. 2014 Quarter-final	Kilmurry-Ibrickane	2-10 - 1-11	Clondegad	Cooraclare

14 Sept. 2014 Quarter-final	Éire Óg, Ennis	2-13 - 3-07	St. Joseph's, Miltown Malbay	Kilmihil

=== Semi-finals ===
27 Sept. 2014 Semi-final	Éire Óg, Ennis	0-14 - 1-07	Kilmurry-Ibrickane	Kilmihil

28 Sept. 2014 Semi-final	Cratloe	0-12 0-08	Cooraclare	Cusack Park, Ennis

== County final ==
12 October 2014 Final	Cratloe	2-12 0-11	Éire Óg, Ennis	Cusack Park, Ennis

Cratloe	Éire Óg, Ennis

== Other Fixtures ==
=== Relegation Playoff ===
7 Sept. 2014 Relegation Final	Shannon Gaels, Labasheeda	2-11 - 1-08	Liscannor	Hennessy Park, Miltown Malbay
