= 2013 Clare Senior Football Championship =

Jack Daly Cup 2013
- League: Clare GAA
- Sport: Gaelic Football
- Duration: 03 August – 16 November 2013
- Number of teams: 16
- Sponsor: Pat O’Donnell & Co.

Changes From 2012
- Promoted: O'Curry's, Doonaha
- Relegated: St. Joseph's, Miltown Malbay

Changes For 2014
- Promoted: St. Joseph's, Miltown Malbay
- Relegated: Liscannor

County Championship
- Winners: Cratloe(1st Title)
- Runners-up: Wolfe Tones, Shannon

The 2013 Clare Senior Football Championship was the 118th staging of the Clare Senior Football Championship since its establishment by the Clare County Board in 1887.

The defending champions and holders of the Jack Daly Cup were Kilmurry-Ibrickane who won their 14th title in 2012.

== Senior Championship Fixtures/Results ==
=== First round ===
- Eight winners advance to Round 2A (winners)
- Eight losers move to Round 2B (Losers)

| 3 August 2013 Round 1 | Cratloe | 0-11 - 0-04 | Kilmurry-Ibrickane | Cusack Park, Ennis |

| 3 August 2013 Round 1 | Éire Óg, Ennis | 2-13 - 2-04 | Clondegad | Lissycasey |

| 3 August 2013 Round 1 | Cooraclare | 0-11 - 0-08 | Kilrush Shamrocks | Doonbeg |

| 3 August 2013 Round 1 | St. Senan's, Kilkee | 1-11 - 1-05 | Wolfe Tones, Shannon | Kilmihil |

| 3 August 2013 Round 1 | Doonbeg | 1-13 - 1-10 (AET) | Lissycasey | Kilmihil |

| 3 August 2013 Round 1 | St. Joseph's, Doora-Barefield | 0-10 - 0-08 (AET) | Liscannor | Hennessy Park, Miltown Malbay |

| 4 August 2013 Round 1 | Ennistymon | 1-09 - 1-08 | St. Breckan's, Lisdoonvarna | Corofin |

| 10 August 2013 Round 1 | O'Curry's, Doonaha | 1-07 - 0-07 (R) | Shannon Gaels, Labasheeda | Cooraclare |

=== Second round ===
==== A. Winners ====
- Played by eight winners of Round 1
  - Four winners advance to Quarter-finals
  - Four losers move to Round 3

| 10 August 2013 Round 2A | St. Joseph's, Doora-Barefield | 1-07 - 1-08 | Éire Óg, Ennis | Cusack Park, Ennis |

| 11 August 2013 Round 2A | St. Senan's, Kilkee | 1-09 - 0-15 | Doonbeg | Quilty |

| 17 August 2013 Round 2A | Ennistymon | 0-09 - 0-07 | O'Curry's, Doonaha | Quilty |

| 20 October 2013 Round 2A | Cratloe | 4-11 - 0-12 | Cooraclare | Gurteen |

==== B. Losers ====
- Played by eight losers of Round 1
  - Four winners move to Round 3
  - Four losers divert to Relegation Play-offs

| 10 August 2013 Round 2B | Kilmurry-Ibrickane | 1-07 - 1-06 | Liscannor | Hennessy Park, Miltown Malbay |

| 11 August 2013 Round 2B | Kilrush Shamrocks | 2-07 - 0-11 | St. Breckan's, Lisdoonvarna | Quilty |

| 24 August 2013 Round 2B | Shannon Gaels, Labasheeda | 0-04 - 1-08 | Lissycasey | Kilmihil |

| 25 Sept. 2013 Round 2B | Clondegad | 0-11 - 0-07 | Wolfe Tones, Shannon | Clarecastle |

=== Third round ===
- Played by four losers of Round 2A & four winners of Round 2B
  - Four winners advance to Quarter-finals
  - Four losers divert to Senior B Championship

| 31 August 2013 Round 3 | Lissycasey | 1-11 - 1-08 | St. Joseph's, Doora-Barefield | Hennessy Park, Miltown Malbay |

| 25 October 2013 Round 3 | Cooraclare | 0-11 - 0-08 | Clondegad | Kilmihil |

| 31 August 2013 Round 3 | St. Senan's, Kilkee | 0-07 2-11 | Kilrush Shamrocks | Doonbeg |

| 31 August 2013 Round 3 | Kilmurry-Ibrickane | 0-08 0-06 | O'Curry's, Doonaha | Doonbeg |

=== Quarter-finals ===
- Played by four winners of Round 2A and four winners of Round 3

| 15 Sept. 2013 Quarter-final | Lissycasey | 0-09 1-05 (AET) | Ennistymon | Clarecastle |

| 15 Sept. 2013 Quarter-final | Éire Óg, Ennis | 2-05 - 0-10 | Kilmurry-Ibrickane | Kilmihil |

| 27 October 2013 Quarter-final | Cratloe | 2-06 0-07 | Kilrush Shamrocks | Clarecastle |

| 02 Nov. 2013 Quarter-final | Doonbeg | 1-08 - 0-04 | Cooraclare | Kilmihil |

=== Semi-finals ===
| 3 November 2013 Semi-final | Cratloe | 2-08 0-09 | Éire Óg, Ennis | Clarecastle |

| 9 November 2013 Semi-final | Doonbeg | 0-15 0-12 | Lissycasey | Kilmihil |

== County final ==
| 16 November 2013 Final | Doonbeg | 0-07 0-10 | Cratloe | Cusack Park, Ennis |

| Doonbeg | Cratloe |

== Other Fixtures ==
=== Relegation Playoff ===
| 19 October 2013 Relegation Final | Wolfe Tones, Shannon | 1-12 0-16 (AET) | St. Breckan's, Lisdoonvarna | Gurteen |
