= 2016 Clare Senior Football Championship =

Jack Daly Cup 2016
- League: Clare GAA
- Sport: Gaelic Football
- Duration: 18 June - 23 October 2016
- Number of teams: 16
- Sponsor: Pat O’Donnell & Co.

Changes From 2015
- Promoted: Corofin
- Relegated: Shannon Gaels, Labasheeda

Changes For 2017
- Promoted: Kilfenora
- Relegated: Kilrush Shamrocks

County Championship
- Winners: Kilmurry Ibrickane(14th Title)
- Runners-up: Cratloe

The 2016 Clare Senior Football Championship was the 121st staging of the Clare Senior Football Championship since its establishment by the Clare County Board in 1887.

The defending champions and holders of the Jack Daly Cup were St. Joseph's, Miltown Malbay who as rank outsiders bridged a 25-year gap from their last title in 1990 to become county champions for the thirteenth time.

== Fixtures/results ==
=== First round ===
- 8 winners advance to Round 2 (winners).
- 8 losers move to Round 2 (Losers).

| 18 June 2016 | Ennistymon | 0-02 2-08 | Lissycasey | Cooraclare |

| 18 June 2016 | Kilrush Shamrocks | 1-09 1-14 | St. Breckan's, Lisdoonvarna | Hennessy Park, Miltown Malbay |

| 18 June 2016 | O'Curry's, Doonaha | 0-11 0-12 | St. Senan's, Kilkee | Doonbeg |

| 18 June 2016 | St. Joseph's, Miltown Malbay | 0-14 0-08 | Wolfe Tones, Shannon | Cusack Park, Ennis |

| 19 June 2016 | Clondegad | 0-09 2-07 | Doonbeg | Labasheeda |

| 19 June 2016 | Cooraclare | 1-06 0-07 | St. Joseph's, Doora-Barefield | Lissycasey |

| 19 June 2016 | Corofin | 0-04 2-09 | Cratloe | Cusack Park, Ennis |

| 19 June 2016 | Éire Óg, Ennis | 1-04 1-12 | Kilmurry-Ibrickane | Labasheeda |

=== Second round ===
==== Winners ====
- 4 winners advance to Quarter-final.
- 4 losers move to Round 3.

| 13 August 2016 | Cooraclare | 1-11 5-15 | St. Joseph's, Miltown Malbay | Quilty |

| 13 August 2016 | Cratloe | 2-14 0-14 (AET) | Lissycasey | Gurteen |

| 14 August 2016 | Doonbeg | 1-15 0-10 | St. Senan's, Kilkee | Kilrush |

| 14 August 2016 | Kilmurry-Ibrickane | 2-15 0-11 | St. Breckan's, Lisdoonvarna | Ennistymon |

==== Losers ====
- 4 winners advance to Round 3.
- 4 losers divert to Relegation Play-offs.

| 13 August 2016 | Éire Óg, Ennis | 1-20 3-15 (AET) | O'Curry's, Doonaha | Cooraclare |

| 13 August 2016 | Ennistymon | 3-16 2-10 | Kilrush Shamrocks | Quilty |

| 14 August 2016 | Clondegad | 1-17 2-05 | Corofin | Hennessy Park, Miltown Malbay |

| 14 August 2016 | St. Joseph's, Doora-Barefield | 0-10 1-10 | Wolfe Tones, Shannon | Cratloe |

=== Third round ===
- 4 winners advance to Quarter-final.
- 4 losers divert to Senior B Championship.

| 27 August 2016 | Cooraclare | 3-10 - 3-07 | Wolfe Tones, Shannon | Gurteen |

| 27 August 2016 | Lissycasey | 1-14 - 0-05 | O'Curry's, Doonaha | Cooraclare |

| 28 August 2016 | Clondegad | 6-16 - 0-07 | St. Senan's, Kilkee | Cooraclare |

| 28 August 2016 | Ennistymon | 1-17 - 1-13 | St. Breckan's, Lisdoonvarna | Cusack Park, Ennis |

=== Quarter-finals ===
| 11 September 2016 | Clondegad | 0-09 - 0-14 | St. Joseph's, Miltown Malbay | Doonbeg |

| 11 September 2016 | Cooraclare | 2-08 - 0-06 | Doonbeg | Kilmihil |

| 11 September 2016 | Cratloe | 2-13 - 1-10 | Ennistymon | Cusack Park, Ennis |

| 18 September 2016 | Kilmurry-Ibrickane | 2-19 - 0-09 | Lissycasey | Cooraclare |

=== Semi-finals ===
| 25 September 2016 | Cooraclare | 1-04 - 2-11 | Kilmurry-Ibrickane | Doonbeg |

| 25 September 2016 | Cratloe | 2-15 4-05 (AET) | St. Joseph's, Miltown Malbay | Cusack Park, Ennis |

=== Final ===
| 9 October 2016 | Cratloe | 1-09 0-12 | Kilmurry-Ibrickane | Cusack Park, Ennis |
| | Cathal McInerney 1-5 (0-3f); David Collins, Podge Collins, Conor Ryan, Shane Gleeson 0-1 each | | Keelan Sexton 0-5 (0-2f); Ian McInerney (1f, 1’45) 0-2; Niall Hickey, Shane Hickey, Enda Coughlan, Michael Hogan, Noel Downes 0-1 each | Referee: Rory Hickey (Éire Óg) |

| 23 October 2016 Replay | Cratloe | 0-06 2-13 | Kilmurry-Ibrickane | Cusack Park, Ennis |
| | Cathal McInerney 0-4 (0-3f), Martin Oige Murphy, Sean Collins (0-1f) 0-1 each. | | Keelan Sexton 1-4 (1-0 pen, 0-1f), Martin McMahon 1-0, Shane Hickey, Ian McInerney (0-2f), Mark McCarthy 0-2 each; Michael Hogan, Peter O’Dwyer, Michael O’Dwyer 0-1 each | Referee: Pat Cosgrove (Corofin) |

| Cratloe | Kilmurry-Ibrickane |

== Other Fixtures ==
=== Relegation Playoff ===
| 11 Sept. 2016 Relegation Final | Kilrush Shamrocks | 1-07 - 1-10 | St. Joseph's, Doora-Barefield | Kilmihil |
