= 2019 Clare Senior Football Championship =

Jack Daly Cup 2019
- League: Clare GAA
- Sport: Football
- Duration: 10 August – 27 October 2019
- Number of teams: 13
- Sponsor: Pat O’Donnell & Co.

Changes From 2018
- Promoted: Kilrush Shamrocks
- Relegated: Kilfenora; O'Curry's, Doonaha; St. Breckan's, Lisdoonvarna; St. Joseph's, Doora-Barefield; Wolfe Tones, Shannon

Changes For 2020
- Promoted: St. Breckan's, Lisdoonvarna
- Relegated: Corofin

County Championship
- Winners: St. Joseph's, Miltown Malbay (15th Title)
- Runners-up: Kilmurry-Ibrickane

Senior B Championship
- Winners: Éire Óg, Ennis

The 2019 Clare Senior Football Championship was the 124th staging of the Clare Senior Football Championship since its establishment by the Clare County Board in 1887.

The 2018 champions, and holders of the Jack Daly Cup were St. Joseph's, Miltown Malbay who became the county champions for the second time in three years winning their fourteenth overall title.

In 2016 a Football Review Agreement decided that from 2019 onwards the Clare Senior and Intermediate Football Championships would both involve twelve teams in an effort to make both more competitive. This meant that five clubs would lose their senior status and be relegated down to the Clare Intermediate Football Championship. The eleven remaining senior clubs would be joined by the intermediate champions to form the new senior championship, and thereby increasing the intermediate championship from eight to twelve teams. 2018 saw the relegation of St. Joseph's, Doora-Barefield, Kilfenora, O'Curry's, St. Breckan's and Wolfe Tones down to Intermediate.

As part of the 2016 Football Review Agreement, a pathway was left open for any amalgamations that wished to enter the senior championship. Two intermediate clubs - Naomh Eoin, Cross & O'Curry's, Doonaha - both from the Loop Head Peninsula, took up this opportunity to compete together. According to the Clare GAA Master Fixtures Plan 2019, any amalgamations that enter a team are immune from relegation.

== Senior Championship Fixtures ==
=== Group stage ===
- Each team plays all the other teams in their group once. Two points are awarded for a win and one for a draw.
  - The top two teams in each group advance to Quarter-Finals
  - The bottom team in each group contest Relegation Playoffs
- One group of four and three groups of three.
- 2018 semi-finalists are seeded and kept separate.

==== Group A ====
Quarter-Final, Seeded Quarter-Final, Unseeded Relegation Playoff

Team	Pld	W	D	L	F	A	Diff	Pts
St. Joseph's, Miltown Malbay	3	2	1	0	50	30	+20	5
Kilmihil	3	2	0	1	56	47	+9	4
Kilrush Shamrocks	3	1	0	2	38	62	-24	2
Naomh Eoin / O'Curry's	3	0	1	2	35	40	-5	1

10 August 2019 Round 1	Kilmihil	1-12 - 1-16	St. Joseph's, Miltown Malbay	Cooraclare

11 August 2019	Kilrush Shamrocks	1-13 - 2-08	Naomh Eoin / O'Curry's	Kilkee

25 August 2019 Round 2	Kilmihil	0-15 - 2-06	Naomh Eoin / O'Curry's	Doonbeg

25 August 2019	Kilrush Shamrocks	0-06 - 3-13	St. Joseph's, Miltown Malbay	Cooraclare

7 September 2019 Round 3	Kilmihil	5-11 - 1-13	Kilrush Shamrocks	Cooraclare

9 September 2019	Naomh Eoin / O'Curry's	1-06 - 0-09	St. Joseph's, Miltown Malbay	Cooraclare

==== Group B ====
Quarter-Final, Seeded Quarter-Final, Unseeded Relegation Playoff

Team	Pld	W	D	L	F	A	Diff	Pts
Kilmurry-Ibrickane	2	2	0	0	31	13	+18	4
Lissycasey	2	1	0	1	26	21	+5	2
Corofin	2	0	0	2	18	41	-23	0

10 August 2019 Round 1	Kilmurry-Ibrickane	0-09 0-07	Lissycasey	Kilmihil

24 August 2019 Round 2	Corofin	0-06 2-16	Kilmurry-Ibrickane	Ennistymon

7 September 2019 Round 3	Corofin	0-12 1-16	Lissycasey	Cusack Park, Ennis

==== Group C ====
Quarter-Final, Seeded Quarter-Final, Unseeded Relegation Playoff

Team	Pld	W	D	L	F	A	Diff	Pts
Ennistymon	2	2	0	0	33	19	+14	4
Doonbeg	2	0	1	1	28	31	-3	1
Cooraclare	2	0	1	1	25	36	-11	1

11 August 2019 Round 1	Doonbeg	1-08 1-11	Ennistymon	Cusack Park, Ennis

24 August 2019 Round 2	Cooraclare	0-08 2-13	Ennistymon	Hennessy Park, Miltown Malbay

8 September 2019 Round 3	Cooraclare	0-17 - 1-14	Doonbeg	Kilmihil

==== Group D ====
Quarter-Final, Seeded Quarter-Final, Unseeded Relegation Playoff

Team	Pld	W	D	L	F	A	Diff	Pts
Éire Óg, Ennis	2	2	0	0	42	29	+13	4
Cratloe	2	1	0	1	33	26	+7	2
Clondegad	2	0	0	2	27	47	-20	0

11 August 2019 Round 1	Cratloe	1-18 0-10	Clondegad	Cusack Park, Ennis

25 August 2019 Round 2	Cratloe	1-09 0-16	Éire Óg, Ennis	Cusack Park, Ennis

7 September 2019 Round 3	Clondegad	0-17 3-17	Éire Óg, Ennis	Cusack Park, Ennis

=== Quarter-finals ===
- Played by top two placed teams from Groups A-D
  - Four losers divert to Senior B Championship

21 September 2019 Quarter-Final	Cratloe	1-16 - 0-08	Ennistymon	Cusack Park, Ennis

21 September 2019 Quarter-Final	Kilmihil	1-10 - 2-14	Kilmurry-Ibrickane	Doonbeg

21 September 2019 Quarter-Final	Lissycasey	1-05 - 0-12	St. Joseph's, Miltown Malbay	Cooraclare

22 September 2019 Quarter-Final	Doonbeg	4-08 1-12 (AET)	Éire Óg, Ennis	Hennessy Park, Miltown Malbay

=== Semi-finals ===
5 October 2019 Semi-Final	Doonbeg	1-12 1-16	St. Joseph's, Miltown Malbay	Cusack Park, Ennis

6 October 2019 Semi-Final	Cratloe	1-08 0-13	Kilmurry-Ibrickane	Cusack Park, Ennis

== County Final ==
20 October 2019 Final	Kilmurry-Ibrickane	0-09 0-09	St. Joseph's, Miltown Malbay	Cusack Park, Ennis

27 October 2019 Final (Replay)	Kilmurry-Ibrickane	0-08 0-12	St. Joseph's, Miltown Malbay	Cusack Park, Ennis

Kilmurry-Ibrickane	St. Joseph's, Miltown Malbay

== Other Fixtures ==
=== Senior B Championship ===
- Played by four losers of Quarter-Finals

5 October 2019 B Semi-Final	Éire Óg, Ennis	3-11 - 2-07	Ennistymon	Corofin

5 October 2019 B Semi-Final	Kilmihil	2-11 - 0-14	Lissycasey	Kilrush

20 October 2019 B Final	Éire Óg, Ennis	2-15 - 0-13	Kilmihil	Cusack Park, Ennis

=== Relegation Playoffs ===
- Played by the four bottom placed teams in Groups A-D.
  - Win once to remain in Senior Championship for 2020
  - Lose twice and relegated to Intermediate for 2020

21 September 2019 Playoff 1A	Clondegad	2-10 - 2-08	Kilrush Shamrocks	Doonbeg

22 September 2019 Playoff 1B	Cooraclare	5-11 - 0-14	Corofin	Lissycasey

6 October 2019 Playoff 2	Corofin	0-14 - 3-10	Kilrush Shamrocks	Hennessy Park, Miltown Malbay
