= Conor Cleary =

Irish hurler

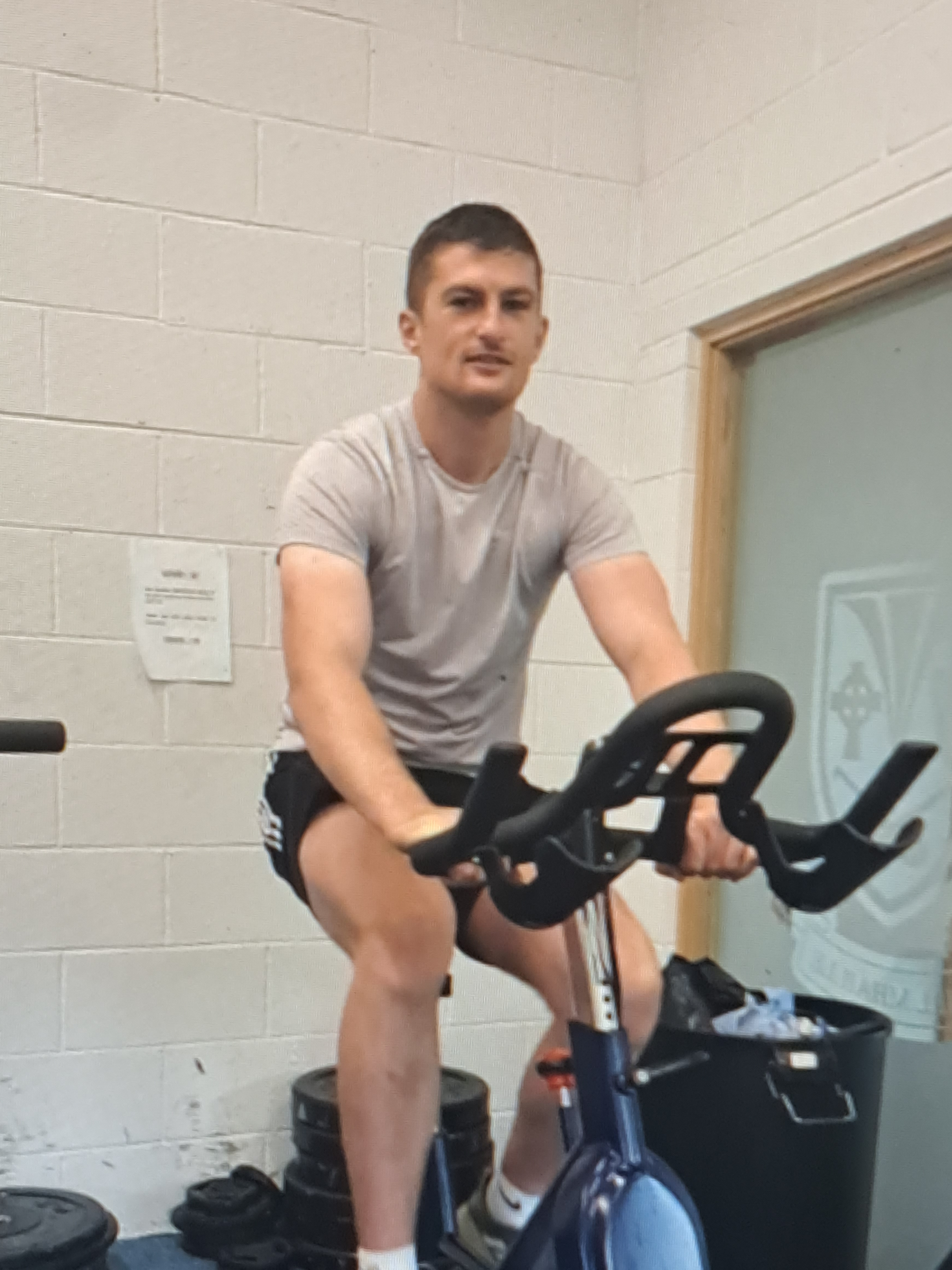

Personal information
- Native name: Conchur Ó Cléirigh (Irish)
- Born: 27 January 1994 (age 32) Miltown Malbay, County Clare, Ireland
- Occupation: Secondary school teacher

Sport
- Sport: Hurling
Clubs
- Years: Club
- St. Joseph's, Miltown Malbay (SF); Kilmaley (SH)
Club titles
	Football	Hurling
Clare titles	3	0
College
- Years: College
- NUI Galway
College titles
- Fitzgibbon titles: 0
Inter-county
- Years: County
- 2014-present: Clare
Inter-county titles
- Munster titles: 0
- All-Irelands: 1
- NHL: 2
- All Stars: 0

Conor Cleary (born 27 January 1994) is an Irish hurler and Gaelic footballer. At club he plays with St. Joseph's, Miltown Malbay and Kilmaley, while he has also lined out at inter-county level with various Clare teams.

== Career ==
Cleary first played hurling and Gaelic football to a high standard as a student at St. Flannan's College in Ennis. He lined out for the college in all grades, including both the Harty Cup and Corn Uí Mhuirí competitions. Cleary later played with and captained NUI Galway in the Fitzgibbon Cup, a role which resulted in his inclusion on the Team of the Year in 2018.

At club level, Cleary first played Gaelic football with St. Joseph's, Miltown Malbay, while he also played hurling with the Kilmaley club. He was part of the latter side's under-21 team that claimed the Clare U21AHC title in 2015. Cleary has also won three Clare SFC medals with Miltown Malbay, as well as a Clare IHC title with Kilmaley in 2017.

Cleary first appeared on the inter-county scene with Clare as a member of the minor team in 2012. He subsequently progressed to the under-21 team and won back-to-back All-Ireland U21HC medals in 2013 and 2014. He captained the team in his third and final season in 2015. By that stage, Cleary had already joined the senior team.

He was at centre-back when Clare won the National League title in 2016.

On 21 July 2024, he started at full-back as Clare won the All-Ireland for the first time in 11 years after an extra-time win against Cork by 3–29 to 1-34, claiming their fifth All-Ireland title.

== Honours ==
St Joseph's, Miltown Malbay

- Clare Senior Football Championship: 2015, 2018, 2019

Kilmaley

- Clare Intermediate Hurling Championship: 2017
- Clare Under-21 A Hurling Championship: 2015

Clare

- All-Ireland Senior Hurling Championship: 2024
- National Hurling League: 2016, 2024 (c)
- All-Ireland Under-21 Hurling Championship: 2013, 2014
- Munster Under-21 Hurling Championship: 2013, 2014
