= 2015 Clare Senior Football Championship =

Jack Daly Cup 2015
- League: Clare GAA
- Sport: Gaelic Football
- Duration: 25 July - 18 October 2015
- Number of teams: 16
- Sponsor: Pat O’Donnell & Co.

Changes From 2014
- Promoted: Wolfe Tones, Shannon
- Relegated: Liscannor

Changes For 2016
- Promoted: Corofin
- Relegated: Shannon Gaels

County Championship
- Winners: St. Joseph's, Miltown Malbay (13th Title)
- Runners-up: Cooraclare

The 2015 Clare Senior Football Championship was the 120th staging of the Clare Senior Football Championship since its establishment by the Clare County Board in 1887.

The defending champions and holders of the Jack Daly Cup were Cratloe who successfully defended their maiden title won in 2013. Having defeated Crusheen in the senior hurling final seven days earlier, they completed a historic first Clare Senior Championship 'Double' since Ennis Dalcassians in 1929, defeating Éire Óg, Ennis in the 2014 county football final.

== Senior Championship Fixtures/Results ==
=== First round ===
- Eight winners advance to Round 2A (winners)
- Eight losers move to Round 2B (Losers)

25 July 2015 Round 1	Clondegad	2-11 - 1-07	Shannon Gaels, Labasheeda	Cooraclare

25 July 2015 Round 1	Cooraclare	1-11 1-10	Wolfe Tones, Shannon	Clarecastle

25 July 2015 Round 1	Éire Óg, Ennis	0-13 3-06	Ennistymon	Hennessy Park, Miltown Malbay

25 July 2015 Round 1	Lissycasey	0-16 1-14 (AET)	St. Breckan's, Lisdoonvarna	Hennessy Park, Miltown Malbay

26 July 2015 Round 1	Cratloe	4-09 - 2-09	Kilmurry-Ibrickane	Lissycasey

26 July 2015 Round 1	Kilrush Shamrocks	3-09 - 1-07	St. Joseph's, Doora-Barefield	Kilmihil

26 July 2015 Round 1	O'Curry's, Doonaha	2-08 - 0-05	St. Senan's, Kilkee	Doonbeg

1 August 2015 Round 1	Doonbeg	0-11 - 0-13	St. Joseph's, Miltown Malbay	Quilty

=== Second round ===
==== A. Winners ====
- Played by eight winners of Round 1
  - Four winners advance to Quarter-finals
  - Four losers move to Round 3

15 August 2015 Round 2A	Clondegad	2-16 - 0-11	O'Curry's, Doonaha	Doonbeg

15 August 2015 Round 2A	Kilrush Shamrocks	1-09 - 0-07	St. Breckan's, Lisdoonvarna	Hennessy Park, Miltown Malbay

16 August 2015 Round 2A	Cooraclare	1-09 1-08	Cratloe	Clarecastle

16 August 2015 Round 2A	Ennistymon	0-09 - 0-11	St. Joseph's, Miltown Malbay	Kilmihil

==== B. Losers ====
- Played by eight losers of Round 1
  - Four winners move to Round 3

15 August 2015 Round 2B	Éire Óg, Ennis	0-06 0-08	Lissycasey	Clarecastle

15 August 2015 Round 2B	St. Joseph's, Doora-Barefield	2-08 0-11	Wolfe Tones, Shannon	Clarecastle

16 August 2015 Round 2B	Doonbeg	0-08 - 1-10	St. Senan's, Kilkee	Kilrush

16 August 2015 Round 2B	Kilmurry-Ibrickane	1-25 - 0-04	Shannon Gaels, Labasheeda	Cooraclare

=== Third round ===
- Played by four losers of Round 2A & four winners of Round 2B
  - Four winners advance to Quarter-finals

29 August 2015 Round 3	Lissycasey	0-06 0-07	O'Curry's, Doonaha	Cooraclare

30 August 2015 Round 3	Cratloe	0-20 1-05	St. Senan's, Kilkee	Lissycasey

30 August 2015 Round 3	Ennistymon	1-09 0-09	Kilmurry-Ibrickane	Cusack Park, Ennis

30 August 2015 Round 3	St. Breckan's, Lisdoonvarna	2-15 2-13	St. Joseph's, Doora-Barefield	Corofin

=== Quarter-finals ===
- Played by four winners of Round 2A and four winners of Round 3

12 September 2015 Quarter-final	Cooraclare	1-11 - 1-10	O'Curry's, Doonaha	Doonbeg

12 September 2015 Quarter-final	Ennistymon	0-13 - 1-13	St. Joseph's, Miltown Malbay	Doonbeg

13 September 2015 Quarter-final	Clondegad	1-12 0-11	Cratloe	Cusack Park, Ennis

13 September 2015 Quarter-final	Kilrush Shamrocks	1-07 2-09	St. Breckan's, Lisdoonvarna	Hennessy Park, Miltown Malbay

=== Semi-finals ===
26 September 2015 Semi-final	St. Breckan's, Lisdoonvarna	0-07 2-07	St. Joseph's, Miltown Malbay	Cusack Park, Ennis

27 September 2015 Semi-final	Clondegad	2-13 4-10	Cooraclare	Kilmihil

== County final ==
18 October 2015 Final	Cooraclare	0-09 0-13	St. Joseph's, Miltown Malbay	Cusack Park, Ennis

Cooraclare	St. Joseph's, Miltown Malbay

== Other Fixtures ==
=== Relegation Playoff ===
13 Sept. 2015 Relegation Final	Wolfe Tones, Shannon	5-02 - 0-05	Shannon Gaels, Labasheeda	Lissycasey

== Championship statistics ==
=== Miscellaneous ===
- St. Joseph's, Miltown Malbay win their first title since 1990.
- Cooraclare qualify for the final for the first time since 1997.
