= 2018 Clare Senior Football Championship =

Jack Daly Cup 2018
- League: Clare GAA
- Sport: Football
- Duration: 11 August - 28 October 2018
- Teams: 16
- Sponsor: Pat O’Donnell & Co.

Changes From 2017
- Promoted: Kilmihil
- Relegated: St. Senan's, Kilkee

Changes For 2019
- Promoted: Kilrush Shamrocks
- Relegated: Kilfenora; O'Curry's, Doonaha; St. Breckan's, Lisdoonvarna; St. Joseph's, Doora-Barefield; Wolfe Tones, Shannon

County Championship
- Winners: St. Joseph's, Miltown Malbay (14th Title)
- Runners-up: Ennistymon

Senior B Championship
- Winners: Doonbeg

The 2018 Clare Senior Football Championship will be the 123rd staging of the Clare Senior Football Championship since its establishment by the Clare County Board in 1887.

The defending champions and holders of the Jack Daly Cup were Kilmurry-Ibrickane who retained their crown to win their fifteenth overall senior title in October 2017.

In 2017 it was decided that from 2019 onwards the Clare Senior Football Championship would be cut from sixteen to twelve teams. This means that five clubs will lose their senior status and be relegated down to the Clare Intermediate Football Championship for 2019. The eleven remaining senior clubs will be joined by the 2018 intermediate champions to form the new championship.

== Senior Championship Fixtures/Results ==
=== First round ===
- Eight winners advance to Round 2A (winners)
- Eight losers move to Round 2B (Losers)

| 11 August 2018 Round 1 | Clondegad | 1-18 - 0-04 | St. Joseph's, Doora-Barefield | Cusack Park, Ennis |

| 11 August 2018 Round 1 | Cratloe | 4-13 - 0-12 | Kilmihil | Cusack Park, Ennis |

| 11 August 2018 Round 1 | Éire Óg, Ennis | 0-09 - 0-10 | Lissycasey | Gurteen |

| 11 August 2018 Round 1 | Ennistymon | 5-10 - 1-07 | O'Curry's, Doonaha | Cooraclare |

| 11 August 2018 Round 1 | Kilfenora | 0-04 - 7-20 | Kilmurry-Ibrickane | Ennistymon |

| 12 August 2018 Round 1 | Cooraclare | 2-15 - 2-20 (AET) | St. Breckan's, Lisdoonvarna | Hennessy Park, Miltown Malbay |

| 12 August 2018 Round 1 | Corofin | 1-06 - 0-13 | Doonbeg | Hennessy Park, Miltown Malbay |

| 12 August 2018 Round 1 | St. Joseph's, Miltown Malbay | 5-15 - 1-03 | Wolfe Tones, Shannon | Cusack Park, Ennis |

=== Second round ===
==== A. Winners ====
- Played by eight winners of Round 1
  - Four winners advance to Quarter-finals
  - Four losers move to Round 3

| 1 September 2018 Round 2A | Clondegad | 1-12 - 1-13 | Cratloe | Cusack Park, Ennis |

| 1 September 2018 Round 2A | Doonbeg | 0-11 - 2-16 | St. Joseph's, Miltown Malbay | Quilty |

| 1 September 2018 Round 2A | Ennistymon | 2-11 - 0-09 | St. Breckan's, Lisdoonvarna | Cusack Park, Ennis |

| 1 September 2018 Round 2A | Kilmurry-Ibrickane | 2-15 - 1-14 (AET) | Lissycasey | Kilmihil |

==== B. Losers ====
- Played by eight losers of Round 1
  - Four winners move to Round 3
  - Four losers are relegated to Intermediate for 2019

| 1 September 2018 Round 2B | Cooraclare | 4-12 - 1-05 | O'Curry's, Doonaha | Doonbeg |

| 1 September 2018 Round 2B | Corofin | 2-18 - 1-07 | Kilfenora | Ennistymon |

| 1 September 2018 Round 2B | Éire Óg, Ennis | 4-17 - 0-07 | St. Joseph's, Doora-Barefield | Kilkee |

| 1 September 2018 Round 2B | Kilmihil | 1-11 - 2-06 | Wolfe Tones, Shannon | Gurteen |

=== Third round ===
- Played by four losers of Round 2A & four winners of Round 2B
  - Four winners advance to Quarter-finals
  - Four losers of this round divert to Senior B

| 15 September 2018 Round 3 | Corofin | 2-09 - 1-09 | Lissycasey | Gurteen |

| 15 September 2018 Round 3 | Éire Óg, Ennis | 4-24 - 0-09 | St. Breckan's, Lisdoonvarna | Ennistymon |

| 16 September 2018 Round 3 | Clondegad | 2-14 - 0-08 | Kilmihil | Kilrush |

| 16 September 2018 Round 3 | Cooraclare | 0-15 - 1-07 | Doonbeg | Kilrush |

=== Quarter-finals ===
- Played by four winners of Round 2A and four winners of Round 3

| 29 September 2018 Quarter-final | Clondegad | 1-07 - 2-14 | St. Joseph's, Miltown Malbay | Cusack Park, Ennis |

| 29 September 2018 Quarter-final | Éire Óg, Ennis | 2-10 - 2-12 | Ennistymon | Cusack Park, Ennis |

| 30 September 2018 Quarter-final | Cooraclare | 0-09 - 4-16 | Cratloe | Cusack Park, Ennis |

| 30 September 2018 Quarter-final | Corofin | 0-10 - 3-12 | Kilmurry-Ibrickane | Cusack Park, Ennis |

=== Semi-finals ===
| 13 October 2018 Semi-final | Ennistymon | 2-06 - 0-11 | Kilmurry-Ibrickane | Cusack Park, Ennis |

| 14 October 2018 Semi-final | Cratloe | 1-08 - 1-15 | St. Joseph's, Miltown Malbay | Cusack Park, Ennis |

== County Final ==
| 28 October 2018 Final | Ennistymon | 0-08 - 0-14 | St. Joseph's, Miltown Malbay | Cusack Park, Ennis |

| Ennistymon | St. Joseph's, Miltown Malbay |

== Other Fixtures ==
=== Senior B Championship ===
- Played by four losers of Round 3

| 30 September 2018 B Semi-final | Doonbeg | 2-14 - 2-07 | Lissycasey | Kilmihil |

| 30 September 2018 B Semi-final | Kilmihil | 2-11 - 0-11 | St. Breckan's, Lisdoonvarna | Ennistymon |

| 13 October 2018 B Final | Doonbeg | 2-12 - 2-07 | Kilmihil | Cooraclare |

=== Relegation Playoff ===
- Played by two losers of Senior B Semi-finals
  - Winner remains in Senior Championship for 2019
  - Loser relegated to Intermediate for 2019

| 13 October 2018 Relegation Playoff | Lissycasey | 0-10 - 1-05 | St. Breckan's, Lisdoonvarna | Hennessy Park, Miltown Malbay |
