= St Joseph's, Miltown Malbay GAA =

Gaelic football club in County Clare, Ireland

St Joseph's Miltown
- Naomh Iosaf Sráid na Cathrach
- Founded: 1892
- County: Clare
- Nickname: The Town
- Colours: Claret and Amber
- Grounds: Hennessy Memorial Park

Playing kits
Standard colours

Senior Club Championships
	All Ireland	Munster champions	Clare champions
Football:	-	0	15

St Joseph's Miltown Malbay GAA is a Gaelic Athletic Association (GAA) club located in Milltown Malbay in County Clare, Ireland. The club was formed in 1892.

== Teams ==
The club has teams in both men's and women's competitions. It has men's teams at Senior, Junior A, U21, Minor, U16, U14, U12, U10 and U8 while it has women's teams in Senior, Junior, Minor, U16 and U14.

== Ground ==
Milltown Malbay's home ground is Hennessy Memorial Park, located on Flag Road. It is named after Patrick Hennessy, a former Milltown Malbay and Clare footballer who was murdered on 14 April 1920 by British soldiers. Originally the park was named Miltown Malbay Athletic Grounds, until its renaming on 20 May 1951.

The club began leasing the grounds in 1924 from the mother of president Patrick Hillery for a period of 150 years at a rate of £15 per year. In the 1950s, it was sold to local butcher Tom Hynes, and in 1989, his son Michael Hynes sold the grounds to the club. It underwent redevelopment in the 1990s and was used to host county finals in both football and hurling in the late 1990s as well as several inter-county matches.

In 2011, a 1,200 seater stand was opened on one side of the pitch.

== Notable players ==
- Gordon Kelly
- Noel Walsh

== Honours ==
- Munster Senior Club Football Championship (0): (runners-up in 2018)
- Clare Senior Football Championship (15): 1905, 1906, 1916, 1923, 1925, 1927, 1932, 1949, 1953, 1959, 1985, 1990, 2015, 2018, 2019
- Clare Football League Div. 1 (Cusack Cup) (8): 1942, 1949, 1950, 1960, 1963, 2010, 2019, 2021
- Clare Football League Div. 2 (Garry Cup) (2): 2005, 2023
- Munster Intermediate Club Football Championship (0): (runners-up in 2013)
- Clare Intermediate Football Championship (1): 2013
- Clare Junior A Football Championship (3): 1923, 1924, 1949
- Clare Under-21 A Football Championship (5): 1970, 1971, 1977, 1978, 2002 (with Liscannor)
