= Coolmeen GAA =

Gaelic games club in County Clare, Ireland

- Cúl Mín CLG
- Founded: 1887
- County: Clare
- Nickname: the black and amber
- Grounds: Clondrina, Coolmeen
- Coordinates: 52°40′0.5″N 9°13′19.5″W

Playing kits
Standard colours

Senior Club Championships
	All Ireland	Munster champions	Clare champions
Football:	-	-	2
Ladies' football:	–	–	1

Coolmeen GAA is a Gaelic Athletic Association club based in Coolmeen, County Clare, Ireland. It takes part in competitions organised by the Clare GAA county board. It fields teams in Gaelic football.

== History ==
Coolmeen GAA club was formed in 1887. Since then the club has won numerous Gaelic Football championship titles at adult and underage level. Throughout the last century Coolmeen has won two senior football championships, as well as having success at intermediate and junior levels. The club's adult football team are currently at intermediate status. The last Junior 'A' championship came to Coolmeen in 1999 with a one-point victory over Clondegad in the final. The most recent success came to the club in 2010 when the U21s beat O'Currys/Naoimh Eoin to win their second Under-21 "C" championship in a row. In 2015 the club won the county junior championship after 16 years and then went on to contest the Munster Junior Club Football Championship final where they lost to Templenoe of Kerry.

== Major honours ==
=== Gaelic football ===
- Clare Senior Football Championship (2): 1919, 1922
- Cusack Cup (Clare Football League Div.1) (1): 1944
- Clare Intermediate Football Championship (3): 1959, 1966, 1967
- Munster Junior Club Football Championship Runners-Up: 2015
- Clare Junior A Football Championship (6): 1922, 1958, 1964, 1983, 1999, 2015
- Clare Under-21 A Football Championship (1): 2021 (as Cill Cúil Gaels with Kildysart, Kilmihil & Shannon Gaels)
- Clare Under-21 C Football Championship (4): 2009, 2010, 2015, 2016.

=== Hurling ===
- West Clare Hurling Championship (1): 1999

=== Ladies football ===
- Clare Senior Ladies Football Championship (1): 1992
- Clare Intermediate Ladies Football Championship (3): 1991, 2006, 2016

== Notable players ==
Cathal O'Connor and Noel Meaney have represented the county at senior level in the last ten years.
