= Clare Under-21 A Football Championship =

Sports competition in Ireland

Clare Under-21A Football Championship
- Irish: Craobh Fé-21A Peile an Chláir
- Founded: 1964
- Trophy: John Marrinan Cup
- Title holders: Ennistymon (4th title)
- Most titles: Kilmurry Ibrickane (13 titles)
- Sponsors: Berwick Callinan Murphy Solicitors

The Clare Under-21A Football Championship (abbreviated to Clare 21AFC) is an annual GAA club competition organised by the Clare County Board between the top-ranking under-21 gaelic football clubs in County Clare, Ireland.

The winners of the Clare 21AFC are presented with the John Marrinan Cup.

The current (2025) champions are Ennistymon who defeated Clondegad by 3–07 to 0-08, to win their third title in four years, and fourth overall.

== Roll of honour ==
#	Club	Wins	Years won
1.	Kilmurry Ibrickane	13	1966, 1983, 1984, 1995, 1996, 1998, 2001, 2003, 2004, 2005, 2006, 2007, 2016
2.	Kilmihil	7	1968, 1980, 1981, 1982, 1987, 2019 (with Shannon Gaels), 2021 (as Cill Cúil Gaels)
3.	Shannon Gaels, Labasheeda	6	1967, 1969, 1997, 1999, 2019 (with Kilmihil), 2021 (as Cill Cúil Gaels)
4.	Cooraclare	5	1972, 1986, 1988, 1991, 2017
	Éire Óg, Ennis	5	2000, 2013, 2014, 2015, 2018
	St. Joseph's, Miltown Malbay	5	1970, 1971, 1977, 1978, 2002 (with Liscannor)
	St. Senan's, Kilkee	5	1976, 1979, 1989, 1992, 1993
8.	Ennistymon	4	2010, 2022, 2023, 2025
9.	Doonbeg	3	1964, 1965, 1974
10.	Cratloe	2	2009, 2011
	Kilrush Shamrocks	2	1975, 1994
	St. Joseph's, Doora-Barefield	2	2008, 2024
13.	Clondegad	1	2012
	Coolmeen	1	2021 (as Cill Cúil Gaels)
	Kildysart	1	2021 (as Cill Cúil Gaels)
	Liscannor	1	2002 (with Miltown Malbay)
	St. Breckan's, Lisdoonvarna	1	1985
	St. Michael's	1	1973
	Wolfe Tones, Shannon	1	1990

== List of Clare 21AFC finals ==
Year	Winners	Score	Runners-up	Score
2025	Ennistymon	3-07	Clondegad	0-08
2024	St. Joseph's, Doora-Barefield	1–12	Lissycasey	0–14
2023	Ennistymon	0-13 P	St. Breckan's, Lisdoonvarna	2-07
2022	Ennistymon	1–10	Corofin	0-06
2021	Cill Cúil Gaels	1–10	Éire Óg, Ennis	0-08
2020	No Competition			
2019	Shannon Gaels / Kilmihil	3–10	St. Breckan's, Lisdoonvarna	1–15
2018	Éire Óg, Ennis	1-07	St. Joseph's, Doora-Barefield	0-07
2017	Cooraclare		Éire Óg, Ennis	
2016	Kilmurry Ibrickane	1–13	Lissycasey	2-08
2015	Éire Óg, Ennis	0-07	Kilrush / Killimer	0-05
2014	Éire Óg, Ennis	3–11	Clann Lír	1-07
2013	Éire Óg, Ennis	0–11	St. Joseph's, Doora-Barefield	0–10
2012	Clondegad	1–11	Ennistymon	2-07
2011	Cratloe		Ennistymon	
2010	Ennistymon		Lissycasey	
2009	Cratloe		Ennistymon	
2008	St. Joseph's, Doora-Barefield		Kilmurry Ibrickane	
2007	Kilmurry Ibrickane		Wolfe Tones, Shannon	
2006	Kilmurry Ibrickane		Doonbeg	
2005	Kilmurry Ibrickane		Doonbeg	
2004	Kilmurry Ibrickane		Lissycasey	
2003	Kilmurry Ibrickane		St. Joseph's, Doora-Barefield	
2002	Miltown Malbay / Liscannor		Kilmurry Ibrickane	
2001	Kilmurry Ibrickane		Cooraclare	
2000	Éire Óg, Ennis		St. Senan's, Kilkee	
1999	Shannon Gaels, Labasheeda		Kilmurry Ibrickane	
1998	Kilmurry Ibrickane		St. Breckan's, Lisdoonvarna	
1997	Shannon Gaels, Labasheeda		St. Senan's, Kilkee	
1996	Kilmurry Ibrickane		St. Senan's, Kilkee	
1995	Kilmurry Ibrickane		Doonbeg	
1994	Kilrush Shamrocks		Ennistymon	
1993	St. Senan's, Kilkee		Éire Óg, Ennis	
1992	St. Senan's, Kilkee		Kilrush Shamrocks	
1991	Cooraclare		Kilrush Shamrocks	
1990	Wolfe Tones, Shannon		St. Senan's, Kilkee	
1989	St. Senan's, Kilkee		Kilrush Shamrocks	
1988	Cooraclare		Kilmihil	
1987	Kilmihil		Cooraclare	
1986	Cooraclare		St. Breckan's, Lisdoonvarna	
1985	St. Breckan's, Lisdoonvarna		Kilrush Shamrocks	
1984	Kilmurry Ibrickane		St. Joseph's, Miltown Malbay	
1983	Kilmurry Ibrickane		Cooraclare	
1982	Kilmihil		Éire Óg, Ennis	
1981	Kilmihil		St. Joseph's, Miltown Malbay	
1980	Kilmihil		Ennistymon	
1979	St. Senan's, Kilkee		Kilmihil	
1978	St. Joseph's, Miltown Malbay		Kilmihil	
1977	St. Joseph's, Miltown Malbay		St. Michael's	
1976	St. Senan's, Kilkee		Kilrush Shamrocks	
1975	Kilrush Shamrocks		Doonbeg	
1974	Doonbeg		Cooraclare	
1973	St. Michael's		St. Senan's, Kilkee	
1972	Cooraclare		St. Senan's, Kilkee	
1971	St. Joseph's, Miltown Malbay		St. Senan's, Kilkee	
1970	St. Joseph's, Miltown Malbay		Shannon Gaels, Labasheeda	
1969	Shannon Gaels, Labasheeda		St. Joseph's, Miltown Malbay	
1968	Kilmihil		Shannon Gaels, Labasheeda	
1967	Shannon Gaels, Labasheeda		Kilmurry Ibrickane	
1966	Kilmurry Ibrickane		Shannon Gaels, Labasheeda	
1965	Doonbeg		St. Senan's, Kilkee	
1964	Doonbeg		Kilmurry Ibrickane	

- Clann Lír were an amalgamation that drew its players from the Kilfenora, Liscannor and Michael Cusack's clubs from North Clare. Clann Lír lost the 2014 Under-21A football final to Éire Óg.
- Cill Cúil Gaels were an amalgamation that drew its players from the Coolmeen, Kildysart, Kilmihil and Shannon Gaels clubs from West Clare. Cill Cúil Gaels won the 2021 Under-21A football final against Éire Óg.

== See also ==
- Clare Senior Football Championship
- Clare Intermediate Football Championship
- Clare Junior A Football Championship
- Clare Premier Junior B Football Championship
- Clare Junior B Football Championship
- Clare Minor A Football Championship
- Cusack Cup (Clare Football League Div.1)
- Garry Cup (Clare Football League Div.2)
