= Cusack Cup (Clare Football League Division 1) =

Sports competition in Ireland

- Irish: Corn Uí Chíosóg
- Founded: 1929
- Trophy: Cusack Cup
- Title holders: Éire Óg (4th title)
- Most titles: Doonbeg (16 titles)
- Sponsors: WillWeGo.com

The Cusack Cup is an annual GAA club competition organised by the Clare County Board between the top gaelic football clubs in County Clare, Ireland. It is the top division of the Clare Club Football League.

The current (2025) champions are Éire Óg who defeated their neighbours and local rivals, Doora-Barefield, by 3-19 to 0-14 after extra time, to win their first title since 2003, and fourth overall.

== Roll of honour ==
#	Club	Wins	Years won
1.	Doonbeg	16	1954 (as Clohanes), 1957, 1961, 1962, 1965, 1967, 1968, 1969, 1970, 1972, 1981, 1982, 1983, 1991, 1994, 1995
2.	Cooraclare	13	1945, 1953, 1955, 1956, 1958, 1964, 1966, 1985, 1987, 1988, 1992, 2004, 2009
	Kilmurry Ibrickane	13	1933 (as Quilty), 1934 (as Quilty), 1935 (as Quilty), 1997, 2008, 2011, 2012, 2013, 2014, 2015, 2016, 2017, 2018
4.	Kilrush Shamrocks	12	1930, 1937, 1938, 1943, 1947, 1951, 1974, 1978, 1979, 1984, 1986, 2002
5.	St. Joseph's, Miltown Malbay	8	1942, 1949, 1950, 1960, 1963, 2010, 2019, 2021
6.	St. Senan's, Kilkee	7	1946, 1977, 1980, 1989, 1993, 1996, 1999
7.	Éire Óg, Ennis	4	1929 (as Ennis Dals), 1932 (as Ennis Dals), 2003, 2025
8.	Kilmihil	3	1959, 1973, 1990
	Liscannor	3	2000, 2001, 2006
	Shannon Gaels, Labasheeda	3	1971, 1975, 1976
11.	Lissycasey	2	2007, 2024
	St. Breckan's, Lisdoonvarna	2	2005, 2022
13.	Clondegad	1	1936 (as Ballynacally)
	Coolmeen	1	1944
	Ennistymon	1	2023
	Kilfenora	1	1952
	O'Curry's, Doonaha	1	1948

== List of Cusack Cup finals ==
Year	Winners	Score	Runners-up	Score
2025	Éire Óg, Ennis	3-19	St. Joseph's, Doora-Barefield	0-14
2024	Lissycasey	1-09	Ennistymon	0-02
2023	Ennistymon	0-10	St. Breckan's, Lisdoonvarna	0-08
2022	St. Breckan's, Lisdoonvarna	1-09	Kildysart	0-06
2021	St. Joseph's, Miltown Malbay	No Final		
2020	No Competition			
2019	St. Joseph's, Miltown Malbay	1-04	Clondegad	0-06
2018	Kilmurry Ibrickane	0-14	Clondegad	0-13
2017	Kilmurry Ibrickane	0-14	St. Joseph's, Miltown Malbay	0-11
2016	Kilmurry Ibrickane	2-09	Doonbeg	1-08
2015	Kilmurry Ibrickane	1-16	Clondegad	1-14
2014	Kilmurry Ibrickane	0-12	Éire Óg, Ennis	0-09
2013 (R)	Kilmurry Ibrickane	(1-15) 0-12	Éire Óg, Ennis	(2-12) 0-11
2012	Kilmurry Ibrickane	0-10	St. Joseph's, Doora-Barefield	0-06
2011	Kilmurry Ibrickane	1-09	St. Joseph's, Miltown Malbay	0-06
2010	St. Joseph's, Miltown Malbay	1-07	Shannon Gaels, Labasheeda	0-07
2009	Cooraclare	0-10	Kilmurry Ibrickane	0-09
2008	Kilmurry Ibrickane		Doonbeg	
2007 (R)	Lissycasey		Doonbeg	
2006	Liscannor			
2005	St. Breckan's, Lisdoonvarna			
2004	Cooraclare			
2003	Éire Óg, Ennis	2-11	Ennistymon	1-08
2002	Kilrush Shamrocks		Lissycasey	
2001	Liscannor		Kilmihil	
2000	Liscannor		Doonbeg	
1999	St. Senan's, Kilkee		Kilrush Shamrocks	
1998	Competition Unfinished			
1997	Kilmurry Ibrickane		St. Senan's, Kilkee	
1996	St. Senan's, Kilkee		Wolfe Tones, Shannon	
1995	Doonbeg		St. Joseph's, Miltown Malbay	
1994	Doonbeg		Kilrush Shamrocks	
1993	St. Senan's, Kilkee		St. Breckan's, Lisdoonvarna	
1992	Cooraclare		Doonbeg	
1991	Doonbeg		Cooraclare	
1990 (R)	Kilmihil	3-06	St. Breckan's, Lisdoonvarna	0-08
1989	St. Senan's, Kilkee		Doonbeg	
1988	Cooraclare		Doonbeg	
1987	Cooraclare		St. Joseph's, Miltown Malbay	
1986	Kilrush Shamrocks		Cooraclare	
1985	Cooraclare		Kilrush Shamrocks	
1984	Kilrush Shamrocks		St. Joseph's, Miltown Malbay	
1983	Doonbeg		Kilmihil	
1982	Doonbeg		Kilmihil	
1981	Doonbeg		St. Senan's, Kilkee	
1980	St. Senan's, Kilkee		Kilrush Shamrocks	
1979	Kilrush Shamrocks		St. Senan's, Kilkee	
1978	Kilrush Shamrocks		Doonbeg	
1977	St. Senan's, Kilkee		Kilrush Shamrocks	
1976	Shannon Gaels, Labasheeda		Doonbeg	
1975	Shannon Gaels, Labasheeda		Doonbeg	
1974	Kilrush Shamrocks		Kilmihil	
1973	Kilmihil	0-08	Doonbeg	0-04
1972	Doonbeg		Kilmihil	
1971	Shannon Gaels, Labasheeda		Doonbeg	
1970	Doonbeg		Kilmihil	
1969	Doonbeg		Kilmihil	
1968	Doonbeg		Kilmihil	
1967	Doonbeg		Kilmihil	
1966	Cooraclare		Kilmurry Ibrickane	
1965	Doonbeg		Kilmurry Ibrickane	
1964	Cooraclare		St. Joseph's, Miltown Malbay	
1963	St. Joseph's, Miltown Malbay		Kilrush Shamrocks	
1962	Doonbeg		Kilmurry Ibrickane	
1961	Doonbeg		Cooraclare	
1960	St. Joseph's, Miltown Malbay		Doonbeg	
1959	Kilmihil	2-06	Kilrush Shamrocks	0-04
1958	Cooraclare		Kilrush Shamrocks	
1957	Doonbeg		Kilrush Shamrocks	
1956	Cooraclare		Kilrush Shamrocks	
1955	Cooraclare		Ennis Faughs (Ennis Dals / Barefield)	
1954	Clohanes		Kilfenora	
1953	Cooraclare		St. Joseph's, Miltown Malbay	
1952	Kilfenora		Kilrush Shamrocks	
1951	Kilrush Shamrocks		Querrin	
1950	St. Joseph's, Miltown Malbay		Clohanes	
1949	St. Joseph's, Miltown Malbay		Clohanes	
1948	O'Curry's, Doonaha			
1947	Kilrush Shamrocks		St. Joseph's, Miltown Malbay	
1946	St. Senan's, Kilkee		Cooraclare	
1945	Cooraclare		St. Joseph's, Miltown Malbay	
1944	Coolmeen		Lisdoonvarna	
1943	Kilrush Shamrocks		Lisdoonvarna	
1942	St. Joseph's, Miltown Malbay		Kilrush Shamrocks	
1941	No Competition			
1940	No Competition			
1939	No Competition			
1938	Kilrush Shamrocks			
1937	Kilrush Shamrocks			
1936	Ballynacally		Ballyvaughan	
1935	Quilty			
1934	Quilty			
1933	Quilty			
1932	Ennis Dalcassians		Kilrush Shamrocks	
1931	Competition Unfinished			
1930	Kilrush Shamrocks			
1929	Ennis Dalcassians			

- In late 1943, Ennis Dalcassians offered an opportunity to any players from their neighbours and fellow junior club, Doora-Barefield, to join with them and compete for titles at a higher level in both codes. This agreement continued when Ennis Dalcassians became Éire Óg in 1952. Ennis Faughs lost the 1955 Cusack Cup final to Cooraclare.

== See also ==
- Clare Senior Football Championship
- Clare Intermediate Football Championship
- Clare Junior A Football Championship
- Clare Premier Junior B Football Championship
- Clare Junior B Football Championship
- Clare Under-21 A Football Championship
- Clare Minor A Football Championship
- Garry Cup (Clare Football League Div.2)
