= Cill Mhichíl =

Cill Mhichíl is the Irish name for two villages in Ireland:

- Kilmihil, County Clare
- Kilmichael, County Cork
