= St Senan's, Kilkee GAA =

Gaelic games club in County Clare, Ireland

St Senan's, Kilkee
- Naomh Seanáin, Cill Caoi
- Founded: 1900
- County: Clare
- Colours: Blue and White
- Grounds: Kilkee

Playing kits
Standard colours

Senior Club Championships
	All Ireland	Munster champions	Clare champions
Football:	-	0	8

St Senan's, Kilkee is a Gaelic Athletic Association (GAA) club in Kilkee, County Clare, Ireland. The club participates in games organised by the Clare County Board. It is primarily a Gaelic football club. Founded in 1900, the club celebrated its 125th anniversary in 2025. St Senan's, which has won a number of Clare Senior Football Championship titles, has reached the Munster Senior Club Football Championship finals on several occasions. As of 2025, the club's mens team was playing at Junior grade, while the underage sections were amalgamated with the neighbouring Naomh Eoin and O'Currys GAA clubs.

== Honours ==
- Munster Senior Club Football Championship (0): (runners-up in 1989, 1992, 2003, 2005)
- Clare Senior Football Championship (8): 1926, 1928, 1942, 1984, 1989, 1992, 2003, 2005
- Clare Football League Div. 1 (Cusack Cup) (7): 1946, 1977, 1980, 1989, 1993, 1996, 1999
- Clare Intermediate Football Championship (3): 1938, 1940 (as Blackweir), 1974
- Clare Junior A Football Championship (5): 1926, 1970, 1974, 1990, 1996
- Clare Under-21 A Football Championship (5): 1976, 1979, 1989, 1992, 1993
