= Clare Senior Football Championship =

Sports competition in Ireland

- Irish: Craobh Sinsearach Peile an Chláir
- Code: Gaelic Football
- Founded: 1887
- Region: Clare (GAA)
- Trophy: Jack Daly Cup
- No. of teams: 12
- Title holders: Éire Óg (23rd title)
- Most titles: Éire Óg (23 titles)
- Sponsors: TUS
- Motto: There is no hero like a local hero
- Official website: clare.gaa.ie

The Clare Senior Football Championship (abbreviated to Clare SFC) is an annual GAA club competition organised by Clare GAA for top twelve gaelic football clubs in County Clare, Ireland. It is most prestigious competition in Clare football. The Clare SFC final is usually held in the month of October at Cusack Park in Ennis.

The Clare SHC and Clare SFC begin once both the Clare hurling team and Clare football team have concluded their respective inter-county campaigns. Both championships run concurrently on opposite weekends to cater for dual clubs competing in both codes.

In 2014 Cratloe completed a historic first Clare Senior Championship "Double" for their club, and the first in Clare for eighty-five years since the famous Ennis Dalcassians in 1929.

In 2016 the Clare County Board decided that from 2019 onwards the Clare senior and intermediate championships would both become revamped twelve-team competitions in an effort to make both more competitive. This meant that five clubs would lose their senior status and be relegated down to intermediate. The eleven remaining senior clubs would be joined by the 2018 intermediate champions to form the new senior championship. 2018 saw the relegation of Doora-Barefield, Kilfenora, O'Curry's, St. Breckan's and Wolfe Tones down to intermediate for 2019. As part of this decision a pathway was left open for any amalgamations that wished to enter the senior championship and would be immune from relegation. In 2019 two intermediate clubs from the Loop Head Peninsula – Naomh Eoin & O'Curry's – took up this opportunity.

In 2025 Éire Óg completed a historic first Clare Senior Championship "Double" for the town of Ennis in ninety-six years and emulate their predecessors Ennis Dalcassians from 1890, 1911, 1914, and 1929.

The winners of the Clare SFC each year are presented with the Jack Daly Cup, and represent Clare in the Munster Senior Club Football Championship and possibly the All-Ireland Senior Club Football Championship as the Clare champions.

The current (2025) champions and holders of the Jack Daly Cup are Éire Óg who defeated their neighbours and local rivals Doora-Barefield by 1–16 to 2–06 at Zimmer Biomet Páirc Chíosóg in Ennis. This was the club's fourth title in five years and moved them one clear of Kilrush Shamrocks at the top of the Clare SFC Roll of Honour with twenty-two titles.

== Munster & All-Ireland club qualification ==
=== Munster club championship ===
Two Clare clubs have won the Munster Senior Club Football Championship:

- Having lost both the 1972 and 1983 finals to Nemo Rangers (Cork), and the 1991 final to Dr. Croke's (Kerry), Doonbeg won the 1998 Munster senior club title, beating Moyle Rovers (Tipperary) in the final after a replay. They lost to Ballina Stephenites (Mayo) in the All-Ireland senior club semi-final. They were denied back-to-back Munster titles when they lost the 1999 final to University College Cork (Cork).
- Having lost the 1993 final to Nemo Rangers (Cork), Kilmurry Ibrickane won the 2004 Munster senior club title, beating Stradbally (Waterford) in the final after a replay. They lost to Ballina Stephenites (Mayo) in the All-Ireland senior club semi-final. Kilmurry Ibrickane lost the 2008 final to Dromcollogher-Broadford (Limerick), however they reversed that result the following year to win the 2009 Munster senior club title. They beat Portlaoise (Laois) on their way to the 2010 All-Ireland senior club final.

Five more Clare clubs have reached the Munster senior club final:

- Cooraclare lost the 1964 final to Shannon Rangers (Kerry).
- Kilrush Shamrocks reached three finals in four years, but lost to Nemo Rangers (Cork) in both 1978 and 1981, and to St. Finbarr's (Cork) in 1979.
- St. Senan's have reached four finals, but lost to Castlehaven (Cork) in 1989, O'Donovan Rossa (Cork) in 1992, An Ghaeltacht (Kerry) in 2003, and Nemo Rangers (Cork) in 2005.
- Cratloe lost the 2013 final to Dr. Croke's (Kerry).
- Miltown Malbay lost the 2018 final to Dr. Croke's (Kerry).

=== All-Ireland club championship ===
One Clare club has reached the All-Ireland senior club final:

- Kilmurry Ibrickane lost the 2010 final to St. Gall's (Antrim) at Croke Park, Dublin.

No Clare club has won the All-Ireland Senior Club Football Championship.

== 2026 Senior clubs ==
The twelve team competing in the 2026 Clare Senior Football Championship are:

Club	Location	Colours	Titles	Last title
Corofin	Corofin	Red & White	0	–
Cratloe	Cratloe	Blue & White	3	2023
Doonbeg	Doonbeg	Black & White	18	2010
Éire Óg, Ennis	Ennis	Red & White	22	2025
Ennistymon	Ennistymon	White & Black	0	–
Kildysart	Kildysart	Sky Blue & Navy	1	1889
Kilmihil	Kilmihil	Green & Yellow	2	1980
Kilmurry Ibrickane	Quilty	Green & Red	16	2020
Lissycasey	Lissycasey	Maroon & White	1	2007
St. Breckan's, Lisdoonvarna	Lisdoonvarna	Maroon & White	0	–
St. Joseph's, Doora-Barefield	Doora / Barefield	Maroon & White	1	1898
St. Joseph's, Miltown Malbay	Miltown Malbay	Claret & Amber	15	2019

== Venues ==
=== Early rounds ===
Fixtures in the opening rounds of the championship are usually played at a neutral venue that is deemed halfway between the participating teams. Some of the more common venues include Clarecastle GAA Grounds, Cooraclare GAA Grounds, Hennessy Memorial Park, Páirc Finne, Páirc na Muintire, Páirc Naomh Mhuire, Páirc Uí Seancháin and St. Michael's Park. Cusack Park in Ennis also hosts several double-headers in the early rounds of the championship.

=== Later stages ===
The semi-finals and final are usually played at Cusack Park in Ennis. Named after the founder of the GAA, Michael Cusack, the ground has a capacity of just over 20,000. In 2017 a major renovation of the stadium was completed which included the demolition and re-erection of the main stand and construction of a new entrance at the north side of the stadium.

== Winning managers since 1990 ==
Manager	Club	Wins	Years won
Patrick O'Dwyer	Kilmurry Ibrickane	3	1993, 2002, 2004
Aidan Moloney	Kilmurry Ibrickane	3	2016, 2017, 2020
Colm Collins	Cratloe	3	2013, 2014, 2023
Paul Madden	Éire Óg, Ennis	3	2021, 2022, 2024
Mick O'Dwyer	Doonbeg	2	1995, 1996
Pat Hanrahan	Doonbeg	2	1998, 1999
Mícheál McDermott	Kilmurry Ibrickane	2	2008, 2009
John Kennedy	Kilmurry Ibrickane	2	2011, 2012
Michael Neylon	St. Joseph's, Miltown Malbay	2	2015, 2018
Shane Daniels	Éire Óg, Ennis	2	2025, 2026
John Reidy	St. Joseph's, Miltown Malbay	1	1990
Eddie O'Sullivan	Doonbeg	1	1991
Noel Roche	St. Senan's, Kilkee	1	1992
Tony Honan	Ennis Faughs	1	1994
Seán Óg O'Connor	Cooraclare	1	1997
John Hickey	Éire Óg, Ennis	1	2000
John Keane	Doonbeg	1	2001
Kieran Marrinan	St. Senan's, Kilkee	1	2003
Tom Prenderville	St. Senan's, Kilkee	1	2005
James Hanrahan	Éire Óg, Ennis	1	2006
Declan Conway	Lissycasey	1	2007
Kieran O'Mahony	Doonbeg	1	2010
David O'Brien	St. Joseph's, Miltown Malbay	1	2019

== Trophy ==
The winning team is presented with the Jack Daly Cup. A native of Ennis and life-long member of Éire Óg, John (Jack) Daly (1938–2020) lined out at full-forward for Éire Óg when they won the 1957 Clare Senior Hurling Championship. In 1963 he became the youngest ever chairman of the Clare County Board, serving two terms in the role. In 1965 he became the Clare GAA representative on the GAA Central Council until 1970. He was hugely supportive of Clare football and his willingness to donate a trophy for the 1969 Clare Senior Football Championship is testament to this. Mr Daly also donated a second trophy for the 1980 Clare Senior Football Championship after Kilrush Shamrocks completed a historic five-in-a-row from 1975 to 1979, and kept the originally trophy. The third version of the Jack Daly Cup was donated by the Daly family in 2024.

== Roll of honour ==
#	Club	Wins	Years won
1.	Éire Óg, Ennis	23	2000, 2006, 2021, 2022, 2024, 2025, 2026: As Ennis Dalcassians: 1890, 1897, 1899, 1904, 1907, 1909, 1910, 1911, 1913, 1914, 1929; As Ennis Faughs: 1947, 1948, 1952, 1954, 1994
2.	Kilrush Shamrocks	21	1902, 1903, 1912, 1924, 1930, 1931, 1934, 1937, 1938, 1951, 1957, 1958, 1960, 1962, 1975, 1976, 1977, 1978, 1979, 1981, 1987
3.	Doonbeg	18	1955, 1961, 1967, 1968, 1969, 1972, 1973, 1974, 1982, 1983, 1988, 1991, 1995, 1996, 1998, 1999, 2001, 2010
4.	Kilmurry Ibrickane	16	1933, 1935 (as Quilty), 1936 (as Quilty), 1939 (as Quilty), 1963, 1966, 1993, 2002, 2004, 2008, 2009, 2011, 2012, 2016, 2017, 2020
5.	St. Joseph's, Miltown Malbay	15	1905, 1906, 1916, 1923, 1925, 1927, 1932, 1949, 1953, 1959, 1985, 1990, 2015, 2018, 2019
6.	Cooraclare	10	1915, 1917, 1918, 1944 (with Kilmihil), 1945, 1956, 1964, 1965, 1986, 1997
7.	St. Senan's, Kilkee	8	1926, 1928, 1942, 1984, 1989, 1992, 2003, 2005
8.	Cratloe	3	2013, 2014, 2023
	Shannon Gaels, Labasheeda	3	1900 (as Labasheeda), 1970, 1971
10.	Coolmeen	2	1919, 1922
	Kilfenora	2	1941, 1950
	Kilmihil	2	1944 (with Cooraclare), 1980
	Newmarket-on-Fergus	2	1887, 1888
13.	Clarecastle	1	1908
	Kildysart	1	1889
	Killimer	1	1886
	Liscannor	1	1940
	Lissycasey	1	2007
	O'Curry's, Doonaha	1	1946
	St. Joseph's, Doora-Barefield	1	1898 (as Doora)

== List of Clare SFC finals ==
Munster Club Champions Munster Club Finalists

Year	Winners	Score	Runners-up	Score
2026	Éire Óg, Ennis	2-15	Kilmurry Ibrickane	1-10
2025	Éire Óg, Ennis	1–16	St. Joseph's, Doora-Barefield	2-06
2024	Éire Óg, Ennis	1–10	Kilmurry Ibrickane	0-06
2023	Cratloe	1–10	St. Breckan's, Lisdoonvarna	1-08
2022	Éire Óg, Ennis	0-09	Ennistymon	0-06
2021	Éire Óg, Ennis	1–11	Kilmurry Ibrickane	0-09
2020	Kilmurry Ibrickane	1–12	Cratloe	0–12
2019 (R)	St. Joseph's, Miltown Malbay	(0-09) 0–12	Kilmurry Ibrickane	(0-09) 0-08
2018	St. Joseph's, Miltown Malbay	0–14	Ennistymon	0-08
2017	Kilmurry Ibrickane	1–14	Clondegad	0–14
2016 (R)	Kilmurry Ibrickane	(0–12) 2–13	Cratloe	(1-09) 0-06
2015	St. Joseph's, Miltown Malbay	0–13	Cooraclare	0-09
2014	Cratloe	2–12	Éire Óg, Ennis	0–11
2013	Cratloe	0–10	Doonbeg	0-07
2012	Kilmurry Ibrickane	0–10	St. Joseph's, Doora-Barefield	0-04
2011	Kilmurry Ibrickane	0–17	St. Joseph's, Doora-Barefield	0-05
2010	Doonbeg	0–11	Liscannor	0-07
2009	Kilmurry Ibrickane	0–12	St. Senan's, Kilkee	2-03
2008	Kilmurry Ibrickane	0–11	Liscannor	0-05
2007	Lissycasey	0–11	Éire Óg, Ennis	0-06
2006	Éire Óg, Ennis	2-09	Lissycasey	0–13
2005	St. Senan's, Kilkee	3-08	Kilmurry Ibrickane	1-09
2004 (R)	Kilmurry Ibrickane	(2-06) 1-08	Éire Óg, Ennis	(1-09) 0-09
2003 (R)	St. Senan's, Kilkee	(2-05) 0–10	Kilrush Shamrocks	(0–11) 0-07
2002	Kilmurry Ibrickane	1-05	Liscannor	0-06
2001	Doonbeg	2-06	Éire Óg, Ennis	0-07
2000	Éire Óg, Ennis	1–10	Doonbeg	0–10
1999	Doonbeg	1-08	Kilmurry Ibrickane	1-06
1998 (R)	Doonbeg	(1-07) 1-09	Lissycasey	(2-04) 0-02
1997	Cooraclare	1-06	Doonbeg	0-07
1996	Doonbeg	1–10	St. Breckan's, Lisdoonvarna	0-07
1995	Doonbeg		Ennis Faughs (Éire Óg / Barefield)	
1994 (R)	Ennis Faughs (Éire Óg / Barefield)	1–12	Kilrush Shamrocks	2-06
1993	Kilmurry Ibrickane	0-09	Doonbeg	0-07
1992	St. Senan's, Kilkee	1-09	Doonbeg	0–11
1991	Doonbeg	0–10	St. Joseph's, Miltown Malbay	0-06
1990	St. Joseph's, Miltown Malbay	1-06	Kilmihil	0-07
1989 (R)	St. Senan's, Kilkee	(1-09) 2-07	Doonbeg	(2-06) 1-08
1988	Doonbeg	1-05	Kilmihil	0-06
1987	Kilrush Shamrocks		Doonbeg	
1986	Cooraclare	2-06	Éire Óg, Ennis	1-06
1985	St. Joseph's, Miltown Malbay	4-05	St. Breckan's, Lisdoonvarna	0-04
1984	St. Senan's, Kilkee	0–10	Kilmihil	1-02
1983	Doonbeg		Kilrush Shamrocks	
1982 (R)	Doonbeg	(1-05) 0-04	Kilmihil	(1-05) 0-03
1981	Kilrush Shamrocks		St. Senan's, Kilkee	
1980	Kilmihil	1-08	Doonbeg	0-05
1979	Kilrush Shamrocks		Doonbeg	
1978	Kilrush Shamrocks		North Clare	
1977	Kilrush Shamrocks		North Clare	
1976	Kilrush Shamrocks		Kilmihil	
1975	Kilrush Shamrocks		St. Joseph's, Miltown Malbay	
1974 (R)	Doonbeg	(1-06) 0-04	Kilmihil	(1-06) 0-03
1973	Doonbeg		Shannon Gaels, Labasheeda	
1972	Doonbeg		Kilmihil	
1971	Shannon Gaels, Labasheeda		Doonbeg	
1970	Shannon Gaels, Labasheeda	1-03	Kilrush Shamrocks	1-02
1969	Doonbeg		Shannon Gaels, Labasheeda	
1968	Doonbeg		Kilmihil	
1967	Doonbeg		Kilrush Shamrocks	
1966	Kilmurry Ibrickane		Kilrush Shamrocks	
1965	Cooraclare		St. Joseph's, Miltown Malbay	
1964	Cooraclare	2-08	Kilmurry Ibrickane	1-09
1963	Kilmurry Ibrickane		Shannon Gaels, Labasheeda	
1962	Kilrush Shamrocks		St. Joseph's, Miltown Malbay	
1961	Doonbeg		Cooraclare	
1960	Kilrush Shamrocks		Cooraclare	
1959	St. Joseph's, Miltown Malbay		Cooraclare	
1958	Kilrush Shamrocks		Kilmihil	
1957	Kilrush Shamrocks		St. Joseph's, Miltown Malbay	
1956	Cooraclare		St. Joseph's, Miltown Malbay	
1955](R)	Doonbeg		Ennis Faughs (Éire Óg / Barefield)	
1954	Ennis Faughs (Éire Óg / Barefield)		Kilrush Shamrocks	
1953	St. Joseph's, Miltown Malbay		Ennis Faughs (Éire Óg / Barefield)	
1952	Ennis Faughs (Éire Óg / Barefield)		Kilrush Shamrocks	
1951	Kilrush Shamrocks		St. Joseph's, Miltown Malbay	
1950	Kilfenora		Clohanes	
1949	St. Joseph's, Miltown Malbay		Kilrush Shamrocks	
1948	Ennis Faughs (Ennis Dals / Barefield)		O'Curry's, Doonaha	
1947	Ennis Faughs (Ennis Dals / Barefield)	4-05	Clohanes	1-01
1946	O'Curry's, Doonaha		Kilmurry Ibrickane	
1945	Cooraclare		Kilmurry Ibrickane	
1944	Cooraclare / Kilmihil		Kilfenora	
1943	Finalists (Ennistymon & St. Senan's, Kilkee) Both Disqualified			
1942	St. Senan's, Kilkee		Ennistymon	
1941	Kilfenora		St. Senan's, Kilkee	
1940	Liscannor		Kilrush Shamrocks	
1939	Quilty		Kilrush Shamrocks	
1938	Kilrush Shamrocks		Ballyvaughan-Fanore	
1937	Kilrush Shamrocks	1-06	Quilty	1-03
1936	Quilty		Kilrush Shamrocks	
1935	Quilty		Kilmurry Ibrickane	
1934	Kilrush Shamrocks		North Clare	
1933	Kilmurry Ibrickane		St. Senan's, Kilkee	
1932	St. Joseph's, Miltown Malbay		Cooraclare	
1931	Kilrush Shamrocks		St. Joseph's, Miltown Malbay	
1930	Kilrush Shamrocks		Ennis Dalcassians	
1929	Ennis Dalcassians		Coolmeen	
1928	St. Senan's, Kilkee		Kilrush Shamrocks	
1927	St. Joseph's, Miltown Malbay		Ennis Dalcassians	
1926	St. Senan's, Kilkee		Coolmeen	
1925	St. Joseph's, Miltown Malbay		Kilrush Shamrocks	
1924	Kilrush Shamrocks		Kilmurry Ibrickane	
1923	St. Joseph's, Miltown Malbay		St. Senan's, Kilkee	
1922	Coolmeen		St. Senan's, Kilkee	
1921	No Championship			
1920	No Championship			
1919	Coolmeen		Kilrush Shamrocks	
1918	Cooraclare		Coolmeen	
1917	Cooraclare		St. Senan's, Kilkee	
1916	St. Joseph's, Miltown Malbay		Cooraclare	
1915	Cooraclare		Ennis Dalcassians	
1914	Ennis Dalcassians		St. Joseph's, Miltown Malbay	
1913	Ennis Dalcassians		Cooraclare	
1912	Kilrush Shamrocks		Ennis Dalcassians	
1911	Ennis Dalcassians		Cooraclare	
1910	Ennis Dalcassians		Kilrush Shamrocks	
1909	Ennis Dalcassians		Cooraclare	
1908	Clarecastle		St. Joseph's, Miltown Malbay	
1907	Ennis Dalcassians		Labasheeda	
1906	St. Joseph's, Miltown Malbay		Kilrush Shamrocks	
1905	St. Joseph's, Miltown Malbay		Ennis Dalcassians	
1904	Ennis Dalcassians		St. Joseph's, Miltown Malbay	
1903	Kilrush Shamrocks		Labasheeda	
1902	Kilrush Shamrocks		Blackwater	
1901	No Championship			
[1900	Labasheeda	0-07	Kilmihil	0-01
1899	Ennis Dalcassians		Clarecastle	
1898	Doora	0-07	Ennis Dalcassians	0-02
1897	Ennis Dalcassians		Kilrush Shamrocks	
1896	Killimer		Newmarket-on-Fergus	
1895	No Championship			
1894	No Championship			
1893	No Championship			
1892	No Championship			
1891	No Championship			
1890	Ennis Dalcassians		Coore	
1889	Kildysart		Clouna	
1888	Newmarket-on-Fergus	0-02	Kilmacduane	0-01
1887	Newmarket-on-Fergus		Cratloe	

- North Clare were an amalgamation similar to the modern-day divisional teams seen in Cork and Kerry. North Clare drew its players from the Ballyvaughan-Fanore, Corofin, Ennistymon, Kilfenora, Liscannor, Michael Cusack's and St. Breckan's clubs. They competed together at senior level when they were all competing individually at intermediate or junior level. North Clare lost the 1934, 1977 and 1978 senior football finals to Kilrush Shamrocks.
- In late 1943, after Ennis Dalcassians won the junior A football final, they offered an opportunity to any players from their neighbours and fellow junior club, Doora-Barefield, to join with them and compete for titles at a higher level in both codes. Ennis Faughs won the 1947 senior football final against Clohanes. Ennis Faughs won back-to-back titles against O'Curry's in the 1948 senior football final. This agreement continued when Ennis Dalcassians became Éire Óg in 1952. Ennis Faughs contested four consecutive senior football finals from 1952 to 1955, winning both the 1952 and 1954 senior football finals against Kilrush Shamrocks. Ennis Faughs disbanded after losing the 1955 senior football final replay to Doonbeg.
- In late 1992, Éire Óg once again offered an opportunity to any players from their neighbours and fellow intermediate club, Doora-Barefield, to join with them and try to replicate their previous successes at senior level. Ennis Faughs won the 1994 senior football final replay against Kilrush Shamrocks. Ennis Faughs were denied back-to-back titles when they lost the 1995 senior football final to Doonbeg. When Éire Óg won the 1995 intermediate football final, Ennis Faughs were once again disbanded. Doora-Barefield later won the 1997 intermediate football final.

== Records and statistics ==
=== The "Double" ===
The following clubs have won both the Clare Senior Football Championship and Clare Senior Hurling Championship in the same year:

- Four times by Ennis Dalcassianss (1890, 1911, 1914 & 1929)
- Once by Cratloe (2014)
- Once by Éire Óg, Ennis (2025)

=== Consecutive championships ===
- 5-in-a-row:
  - Once by Kilrush Shamrocks (1975–1979)
- 3-in-a-row:
  - Twice by Doonbeg (196]–1969) & (1972–1974)
  - Once by Ennis Dalcassians (1909–1911)

=== By decade ===
The most successful team of each decade, judged by number of Clare Senior Football Championship titles they won, is as follows:

- 1880s: Two titles for Newmarket-on-Fergus (1887, 1888)
- 1890s: Three titles for Ennis Dalcassians (1890, 1897, 1899)
- 1900s: Three titles for Ennis Dalcassians (1904, 1907, 1909)
- 1910s: Four titles for Ennis Dalcassians (1910, 1911, 1913, 1914)
- 1920s: Three titles for St. Joseph's, Miltown Malbay (1923, 1925, 1927)
- 1930s: Five titles for Kilrush Shamrocks (1930, 1931, 1934, 1937, 1938)
- 1940s: Two titles for Ennis Faughs (1947, 1948)
- 1950s: Three titles for Kilrush Shamrocks (1951, 1957, 1958)
- 1960s: Four titles for Doonbeg (1961, 1967, 1968, 1969)
- 1970s: Five titles for Kilrush Shamrocks (1975, 1976, 1977, 1978, 1979)
- 1980s: Three titles for Doonbeg (1982, 1983, 1988)
- 1990s: Five titles for Doonbeg (1991, 1995, 1996, 1998, 1999)
- 2000s: Four titles for Kilmurry Ibrickane (2002, 2004, 2008, 2009)
- 2010s: Four titles for Kilmurry Ibrickane (2011, 2012, 2016, 2017)
- 2020s: Five titles for Éire Óg, Ennis (2021, 2022, 2024, 2025, 2036)

=== Barren spells ===
The longest gaps between successive Clare Senior Football Championship titles are:

- 70 years: Shannon Gaels, Labasheeda (1900–1970)
- 42 years: St. Senan's, Kilkee (1942–1984)
- 40 years: Éire Óg, Ennis (1954–1994)
- 30 years: Kilmurry Ibrickane (1933–1963)
- 27 years: Cooraclare (1918–1945) & Kilmurry Ibrickane (1966–1993)
- 26 years: St. Joseph's, Miltown Malbay (1959–1985)
- 25 years: St. Joseph's, Miltown Malbay (1990–2015)
- 21 years: Cooraclare (1965–1986)
- 17 years: St. Joseph's, Miltown Malbay (1932–1949)
- 15 years: Ennis Dalcassians (1914–929) & Éire Óg, Ennis (2006–2021)
- 14 years: St. Senan's, Kilkee (1928-1942]
- 13 years: Kilrush Shamrocks (1938–1951 & [1962–1975)
- 12 years: Kilrush Shamrocks (1912–1924)
- 11 years: Cooraclare (1945–1956 & 1986–1997) & St. Senan's, Kilkee (1992–2003)
- 10 years: St. Joseph's, Miltown Malbay (1906–1916]

== See also ==
- All-Ireland Senior Club Football Championship
- Munster Senior Club Football Championship
- Clare Intermediate Football Championship
- Clare Junior A Football Championship
- Clare Under-21 A Football Championship
- Cusack Cup (Clare Football League Div.1)
