= Aidan Moloney =

Irish Gaelic footballer

Aidan Moloney is a former Gaelic footballer who played for Kilmurry Ibrickane and the Clare county team. He is known as "Horse".

Moloney captained his club to two Clare Senior Football Championship titles, in 1993 and 2002. He won a Munster Senior Football Championship medal with Clare in 1992. He also won a Munster Senior Club Football Championship title in 2004. He played for his club until 2005.

Moloney has managed several clubs in Clare, including Cooraclare, Kilkee, Kilrush and Shannon Gaels, having begun as a player–manager with Kilmurry in 1999. He managed Kilmurry to the 2016 Clare SFC title, becoming the first person to both captain and manage the club to the title. As of 2025, he was managing Lissycasey for a third year.
