= Kilmihil =

Village in County Clare, Ireland

Kilmihil Irish: Cill Mhichíl
- Village
- Location in Ireland
- Coordinates: 52°43′N 9°19′W
- Country: Ireland
- Province: Munster
- County: County Clare

Population (2022)
  - Total: 472
- Time zone: UTC+0 (WET)
  - Summer (DST): UTC-1 (IST (WEST))
- Irish Grid Reference: R134877

Kilmihil (Irish: Cill Mhichíl, meaning 'church of St. Michael the Archangel') is a village in the Barony of Clonderlaw, in west County Clare, Ireland. It is also a civil parish and an ecclesiastical parish in the Roman Catholic Diocese of Killaloe. The area was officially classified as part of the West Clare Gaeltacht; an Irish-speaking community; until 1956.

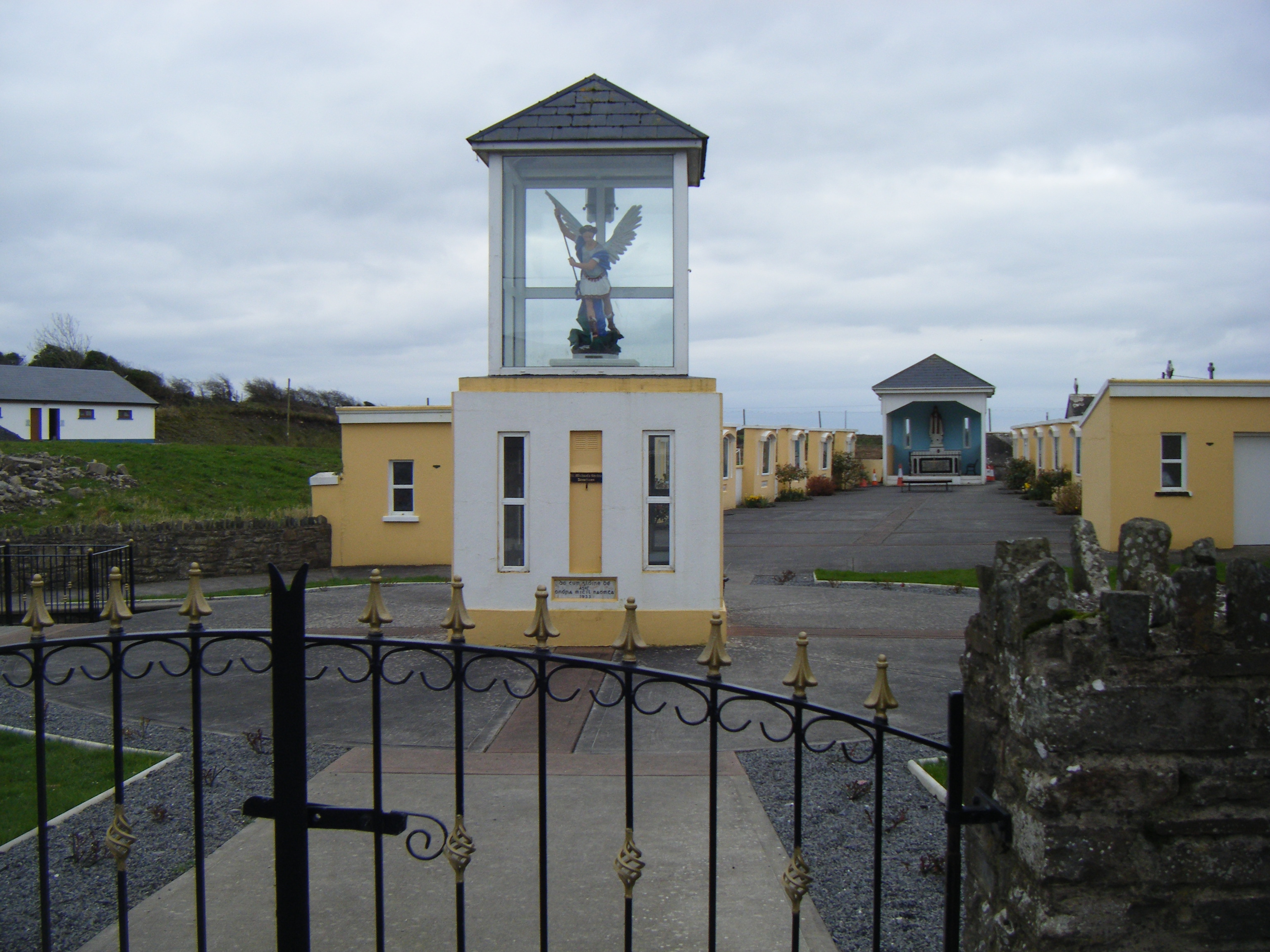
St Michael's Shrine and Holy Well on Main Street

== History ==
It is believed that St. Michael's Church was founded by St. Senan around 530AD. He dedicated this church to St. Michael. For centuries it became a place of pilgrimage to St. Michael, especially in September, as his feast day is on September 29. In 1937, the Curate of the parish, Fr. Patrick O’Reilly, organised the improvement of the well, and the surrounding area. The well is now enclosed, and over this building is the Statue of St. Michael, enclosed in glass. Tradition credits the founding of a church here to St. Senan, in honour of Michael the Archangel. During the reign of Pope Gelasius I (AD 492–496), an apparition of the Archangel was reported to have taken place on the summit of Mt. Garganus, in Apulia, in Italy. This apparition report, and the founding of the church in Kilmihil, both took place during St. Senan's lifetime (AD 488–554 AD). After visiting Rome c. AD 530, he returned to Ireland, wishing to foster devotion to Michael. While travelling from Scattery Island to Doolough, he stopped in Kilmihil, where he founded the church.

== Amenities ==
The village has two grocery stores, a pharmacy, four pubs, a post office, and butcher's shop. Other amenities are the credit union, library, garage, doctors health Centre, creche, retirement village, church, a community centre,and a Garda Station.

There is a primary school and a secondary school (St. Michaels Community College) in the village and a further primary school in the townland of Cahermurphy.

== Sport ==
Kilmihil GAA club won the Clare Senior Football Championship in 1980, its sole victory in the championship's history.

Kilmihil's soccer club is named St. Pat's.

Olympians Thomas O'Donahue and Michael Ryan were born in Kilmihil. Kilmihil Athletic Club founded in 1942 is one of the oldest active athletics clubs in County Clare..

Clare senior football team manager Colm Collins is from Kilmihil.

== Events ==
Kilmihil conducts an annual "Festival of Fun" every year over the August Bank Holiday weekend. It includes a parade, a vintage rally, a raft race on Knockalough Lake and various other activities.

== Parishes ==
The Catholic parish of Kilmihil is part of the Roman Catholic Diocese of Killaloe. The parish church is St Michael's, Kilmihil. Kilmihil is one of the larger parishes in West Clare. It is well known for its Holy Shrine to St Michael, which attracts pilgrims due to its holy water.

The civil parish is part of the historical barony of Clonderalaw. There are 22 townlands in the civil parish. The townlands are Ahaga, Ballydineen, Boulynameal, Carraige, Cahercanavan, Cahermurphy, Castlepark, Cloonakilla, Cragg, Glenmore, Greygrove, Kiltumper, Knockalough, Knockmore, Lack East, Lack West, Lacken, Lietrim, Lissenair, Sorrel Island, Shyan.

== In popular culture ==
Kilmihil is mentioned in several books. O Come Ye Back to Ireland: Our First Year in County Clare, a memoir in which Niall Williams and Christine Breen, describe an Irish/American couple's move from New York back to the cottage of their forebears. (and subsequent books When Summer's in the Meadow and The Luck of the Irish). Kilmihil and environs are also the backdrop for the Born In trilogy by Nora Roberts.

== See also ==
- List of towns and villages in Ireland
