= Shannon Gaels GAA =

Gaelic games club in County Clare, Ireland

Shannon Gaels, Labasheeda
- Gaeil na Sionna, Leaba Shíoda
- Founded: 1940
- County: Clare
- Colours: Red and White
- Grounds: Ballyguiry, Labasheeda, Clare

Playing kits
Standard colours

Senior Club Championships
	All Ireland	Munster champions	Clare champions
Football:	-	-	3

Shannon Gaels is the GAA club of Kilmurry McMahon/Labasheeda, County Clare

== History ==
=== Before Shannon Gaels ===
The first club was formed in May 1887 under the name Labasheeda. Their first ever game was played against Kilmacduane (Cooraclare) on the 21st of that month. The game ended with a victory to Kilmacduane on a scoreline of 0–1 to 0-0. The club continued for another 13 years without any success, until 1900 when a parish team under the name St Patricks captured the county title from Kilmihil by a winning margin of six points. It wasn't until 1930 that the whole parish united as one club (Labasheeda).

=== 1940s ===
The name Shannon Gaels did not appear until 1940, however once again there was a split in the parish. The Shannon Gaels club won the Junior A championship in 1941 defeating Clohanes in a game played at Kilmurry McMahon. The following year, Shannon Gaels completed in the intermediate division and reached the final before being defeated by Kilmihil. With the split continuing, players from the parish captured the Cusack Cup in 1944 playing for Coolmeen. For a period of three years (1946–1948) there was no club in the parish until 1949 when the parish once again united, this time under the name of Shannon Gaels. And it has remained so to this day.

=== 1950s ===
The fifties brought success which was based on a good youth policy under the stewardship of Vincent McGarry. A minor title was won in 1957 with a juvenile title being won the following year and numerous other finals were reached throughout the decade. In 1959 the club annexed its first Junior championship beating Kilfenora by a solitary goal. The club was in Senior ranks for the first time now since 1945.

=== 1960s ===
In 1963, Shannon Gaels contested its first county Senior final since 1907, however the team met its match on the day losing to a more experienced Kilmurry Ibrickane team despite outplaying them for over fifty minutes. Underage success continued notably two under 21 titles in 67 and 69. Shannon Gaels appeared in another county final in 1969 and were defeated by Doonbeg.

=== 1970s ===
The following year success arrived, when the parish had its first Senior county championship success since 1900. On 16 August 1970, Arthur Ford lifted the Jack Daly Cup in the Square in Miltown Malbay after a hard-fought victory over Kilrush Shamrocks. Shannon Gaels won the Senior Championship again in 1971 defeating Doonbeg. P.J. Murphy was on hand to accept the Jack Daly trophy on behalf of the club. This should have been the beginning of something of a famine for the other teams in the county but the following years did not bring the success the tremendous talent which existed in the parish deserved. 1973 saw another final defeat at the hands of Doonbeg. The Cusack Cup was won in '75 and '76 but this was scant consolation for what should have been numerous additions to the Roll of Honour list for the Senior title.

=== 1980s ===
Barren years followed and the only major success of the 1980s was the Banner cup victory in 1986. On 15 May 1984 the club opened Shannon Gaels Park. It was the brainchild of Tommy Lorigan who died before it was completed. The updated facilities included additions to the clubhouse, four changing rooms with shower facilities, a meeting room and a referees changing room.

=== 1990s ===
In the nineties, where the club had a number of under-age successes. One u-12 title, four u-16 titles, and three u-21 titles were won, while in 1999 Noel Kennedy captained the Intermediate team to glory.

=== 2000s ===
The year 2001 brought about a new structure for the senior championship. Groups of four were to play off in a round robin series with the top two teams going forward to the quarter-finals. A victory in the round-robin stage (over Wolfe Tones) was followed by defeats to Éire Óg and Miltown Malbay and this saw the Gaels competing in the Senior B championship. Defeats by Liscannor (after a replay), St Breckan's and, finally, Corofin resulted in relegation back to Intermediate level.

The Intermediate Championship was annexed in 2002 after victories over Kildysart, Kilfenora, Coolmeen and Michael Cusack's. So the Gaels were back in Senior ranks once again. In the 2003 Senior Championship the Gaels exceeded the expectations of many by qualifying from their group and reaching the quarter-final. Led by a management team of Anthony Daly, Mickey Cahill and Mick O'Shea, the Gaels fought an amazing battle with St Senan's Kilkee in the quarter-final and were unlucky not to proceed to the semi-final as they drew their first match with Kilkee. The Gaels were defeated by Kilkee in the replay and Kilkee went on to win the county title.

The following year, the club reached the semi-final where they faced eventual champions Kilmurry Ibrickane. After a bright start, the Gaels challenge faltered and were eventually well beaten.

In 2005, a new management team were put in place. Promotion to Division 1 of the league followed. However, the senior team were unable to reach the quarter-finals for the first time in three years. The Senior B championship beckoned and after good wins over Kilrush and Kildysart, the Gaels defeated O'Curry's to win the Scales Cup for the first time.

In 2006, the club beat Liscannor to set up a quarter final tie with Lissycasey. The Gaels led by three points with time running out before an opportunist goal for Lissycasey resulted in a replay. The Gaels again led in the replay before the game was tied at the end of normal time before Lissycasey ran out winners in extra time.

The Gaels' 2007 season saw relegation from Cusack Cup and also a failure to reach the quarter-finals after a defeat to Doonbeg in the last round robin match. In 2008, Shannon Gaels reached the quarter-final where they were beaten by St. Senan's Kilkee. The club regained their Cusack Cup status despite losing the Garry Cup final to Cooraclare.

In 2009, relegation battles resulted in both the Cusack Cup and the Senior championship and the club survived at both levels.

=== 2010s ===
Peter O'Connell, Michael Crehan and Michael Madigan were appointed as senior management team but the senior team started off on a bad note with a defeat in the first round of the Cusack Cup at the hands of Clondegad. However, subsequent victories over St Joseph's Miltown Malbay, Liscannor, Cooraclare, Éire Óg Inis & St Senan's Kilkee saw Shannon Gaels qualify for the semi-finals of the Cusack Cup with two games to spare. The last two games of the round series saw heavy defeats at the hands of Doonbeg and Kilmurry Ibrickane. In the first round of the senior championship, Shannon Gaels overcame a seven-point deficit with ten minutes to go win by a point against Kilmihil on a scoreline of 2–10 to 2–9. In the semi-final of the Cusack Cup Shannon Gaels played Kilmurry Ibrickane. The teams were level at half time but second half goals from Ruairi Norrby and JP O Neill saw the Gaels emerge victorious on a scoreline of 2–9 to 0–10. Shannon Gaels met St Joseph's Miltown Malbay in the final in Kilmihil on 26 July and led by 0–4 to 0–3 at half time. However, St. Joseph's scored the game's only goal halfway through the second half, and this score proved decisive as the game finished 1–7 to 0–7 in favour of St Joseph's. The second round of the senior championship saw the Gaels defeated Wolfe Tones na Sionna on a scoreline of 1–10 to 0-7 which resulted in qualification for the quarter-final of the senior football championship with a game to spare. In the final round robin game against Éire Óg, the Gaels ran up a strong seven-point lead early in the second half only to lose by three points. In the quarter-final the Gaels suffered disappointment losing by a point to Doonbeg on a scoreline of 0–7 to 0–6.

== Honours ==
=== Adult ===
- Clare Senior Football Championship (3): 1900 (as Labasheeda), 1970, 1971
- Clare Senior B Football Championship (2): 2005, 2011
- Clare Football League Div. 1 (Cusack Cup) (3): 1971, 1975, 1976
- Clare Intermediate Football Championship (2): 1999, 2002
- Clare Junior A Football Championship (2): 1941, 1959
- Banner Cup (1): 1986
- Aberdeen Arms Cup (1): 1973

=== Underage ===
- Clare Under-21 A Football Championship (6): 1967, 1969, 1997, 1999, 2019 (with Kilmihil), 2021 (as Cill Cúil Gaels with Coolmeen, Kildysart & Kilmihil)
- Clare Under-21 B Football Championship (1): 1993
- Clare Minor A Football Championship (4): 1957, 1966, 1967, 1968
- Clare Minor B Football Championship (1): 1960
- Clare Minor C Football Championship (1): 2010
