= Corofin GAA (Clare) =

Gaelic Athletic Association club

- Cora Finne CLG
- Founded: 1885
- County: Clare
- Colours: Red and White
- Grounds: Páirc Finne, Corofin

Playing kits
Standard colours

Corofin GAA is a Gaelic Athletic Association club located in the village of Corofin, County Clare in Ireland. The dual Senior club field teams in hurling and Gaelic football. The club has had many senior inter-county players over time.

== Major honours ==
- Munster lntermediate club hurling championship Runners-Up: 2023
- Munster Intermediate Club Football Championship Runners-Up: 2006, 2021
- Clare Intermediate Football Championship (5): 1987, 2006, 2015, 2021, 2025
- Clare Intermediate Hurling Championship (3): 1991, 2002, 2023
- Clare Junior A Football Championship (1): 1978
- Clare Junior A Hurling Championship (3): 1969, 1980, 2009
- Clare Football League Div. 2 (Garry Cup) (1): 2022
- Clare Under-21 A Hurling Championship (1): 2021 (with Ruan)
- Clare Under-21 A Football Championship Runners-Up: 2022
- Clare Minor A Hurling Championship (2): 2019 (with Ruan), 2020 (with Ruan)

== Notable players ==
- Seamus Clancy
- Robin Mounsey
- Gerry Quinn
- Conor Leen
