= Ennistymon GAA =

Gaelic games club in County Clare, Ireland

- Inis Diomáin CLG
- County: Clare
- Colours: White and Black (Football); Green and Yellow (Hurling)
- Grounds: Ennistymon

Playing kits
Football Kit	Hurling Kit

Senior Club Championships
	All Ireland	Munster champions	Clare champions
Football:	-	-	0

Ennistymon is a Gaelic Athletic Association club located in the town of Ennistymon, County Clare in Ireland. The club field teams in Gaelic Football and hurling competitions. Uniquely in Clare the club wears completely different colours in both codes - white and black for football, green and yellow for hurling. Their club crest also is shown in different colours although they each have a matching design.

== Major honours ==
- Clare Senior Football Championship Runners-Up: 1889 (as Clouna), 1942, 2018, 2022
- Clare Football League Div. 1 (Cusack Cup) (1): 2023
- Clare Intermediate Football Championship (2): 1991, 2005
- Clare Junior A Hurling Championship (1): 2004
- Clare Junior A Football Championship (3): 1973, 1987, 2021
- Clare Under-21 A Football Championship (5): 1973 (as Saint Michaels) 2010, 2022, 2023, 2025
- Clare Minor Football Championship (7): 1971, 2007, 2011, 2019, 2021, 2023, 2026
