= Cooraclare GAA =

Gaelic Athletic Association club

- Founded: 1884
- County: Clare
- Nickname: Milesians
- Colours: Light Blue
- Grounds: Páirc Cuar an Chláir

Playing kits
Standard colours

Senior Club Championships
	All Ireland	Munster champions	Clare champions
Football:	-	0	10

Cooraclare GAA is a Gaelic Athletic Association club located in the village of Cooraclare, County Clare in Ireland. The club field teams exclusively in Gaelic football competitions.

== Honours ==
- Munster Senior Club Football Championship (0): (runners-up in 1964)
- Clare Senior Football Championship (10): 1915, 1917, 1918, 1944 (with Kilmihil), 1945, 1956, 1964, 1965, 1986, 1997
- Clare Football League Div. 1 (Cusack Cup) (13): 1945, 1953, 1955, 1956, 1958, 1964, 1966, 1985, 1987, 1988, 1992, 2004, 2009
- Clare Intermediate Football Championship (5): 1927, 1941, 1943, 1954, 1957 (as Cree)
- Clare Junior A Football Championship (3): 1965, 1988, 1998
- Clare Under-21 A Football Championship (5): 1972, 1986, 1988, 1991, 2017
