= Kilmihil GAA =

Kilmihil
- Cill Mhichíl
- County: Clare
- Colours: Green and yellow
- Grounds: Kilmihil

Playing kits
Standard colours

Senior Club Championships
	All Ireland	Munster champions	Clare champions
Football:	0	0	1

Kilmihil GAA is a Gaelic Athletic Association club located in Kilmihil, County Clare, Ireland. The club is primarily concerned with the game of Gaelic football.

== History ==
Located in the village of Kilmihil in the Barony of Clonderlaw, Kilmihil GAA Club was founded shortly after the establishment of the Gaelic Athletic Association. The club enjoyed its first major success in 1925 when, wearing black and amber jerseys, the Clare JFC title was claimed. This was followed by a first Clare IFC title in 1928. Further honours were claimed in both grades before Kilmihil won the Clare SFC title in 1980 after a defeat of Doonbeg in the final. The turn of the 21st century has seen Kilmihil claim three Clare IFC in a 15-year period between 2008 and 2023.

== Honours ==
- Clare Senior Football Championship (1): 1980
- Clare Intermediate Football Championship (5): 1928, 1958 (as Cahermurphy), 2008, 2017, 2023
- Clare Junior A Football Championship (4): 1925, 1937, 1955, 1956 (as Cahermurphy)

== Notable players ==
- Martin Murphy: Railway Cup-winner (1978)
