= Kilrush Shamrocks GAA =

Gaelic sports club in County Clare, Ireland

Kilrush
- Cill Rois
- Founded: 1886
- County: Clare
- Nickname: The Shams
- Colours: Green and White
- Grounds: The Cricket Field

Playing kits
Standard colours

Senior Club Championships
	All Ireland	Munster champions	Clare champions
Football:	-	0	21

Kilrush Shamrocks are a Gaelic Athletic Association (GAA) club in Kilrush, County Clare, Ireland. They have won the Clare Senior Football championship 21 times, more than any other club in the county, the last title coming in 1987 when the Shamrocks beat Doonbeg.

== History ==
Kilrush Shamrocks GAA club was founded in 1886 under the patronage of Revd. Dr. Dinan PP. Prior to 1900 the club was known as the "Shannon Sweepers". Competitive street leagues provided the basis for a first senior county championship title in 1902. The Shamrocks have gone on to record a total of 21 county titles. The 1930s, 1950s and early 1960s were very successful years for the club, with the club reaching its greatest heights in the 1970s. Throughout these years the local schools and numerous former stalwarts continued to foster and promote Gaelic football in the parish.

Captain Tubridy Memorial Park, affectionately known as "The Cricket Field" is located one mile south of Kilrush, on the road to the Killimer car ferry. In 2016, the construction of a stand was completed at the venue to accommodate spectators. The development of the stand was part of a decade-long series of upgrades which included the addition of floodlighting.

== Major honours ==
- Munster Senior Club Football Championship Runners-Up: 1978, 1979, 1981
- Clare Senior Football Championship (21): 1902, 1903, 1912, 1924, 1930, 1931, 1934, 1937, 1938, 1951, 1957, 1958, 1960, 1962, 1975, 1976, 1977, 1978, 1979, 1981, 1987
- Clare Football League Div. 1 (Cusack Cup) (12): 1930, 1937, 1938, 1943, 1947, 1951, 1974, 1978, 1979, 1984, 1986, 2002
- Clare Intermediate Football Championship (4): 1937, 1952, 1955, 2018
- Clare Junior A Football Championship (3): 1944, 1951 (as Ballykett), 1954 (as Ballykett)
- Clare Under-21 A Football Championship (2): 1975, 1994
