= Clondegad GAA =

Irish Gaelic Athletic Association club

- Founded: 1943
- County: Clare
- Colours: Red and Black
- Grounds: Páirc Mícheál Ó'hEithir, Ballynacally

Playing kits
Standard colours

Senior Club Championships
	All Ireland	Munster champions	Clare champions
Football:	-	-	0

Clondegad GAA is a Gaelic Athletic Association club located in the village of Ballynacally, County Clare, in Ireland. The club field teams exclusively in Gaelic Football competitions.

In 2015, Clondegad reached the semi-finals of the Clare Senior Football Championship by defeating 2014 champions Cratloe. The club reached the senior county final in 2017.

== Honours ==
- Clare Senior Football Championship (0): (runners-up in 2017)
- Clare Football League Div. 1 (Cusack Cup) (1): 1936 (as Ballynacally)
- Clare Intermediate Football Championship (2): 1944, 2011
- Clare Junior A Football Championship (3): 1942 (as Ballycorick), 1969, 2000
- Clare Junior B Football Championship (3): 1997, 2019, 2024
- Clare Under-21 A Football Championship (1): 2012

== Notable players ==
- Gary Brennan
- Paul Flanagan
- Tony Kelly
