= Moyarta (barony) =

Land unit in County Clare, Ireland

Barony of Moyarta
- Location within Ireland
- Coordinates: 52.64223°N 9.653656°W
- Country: Ireland
- Province: Munster
- County: Clare

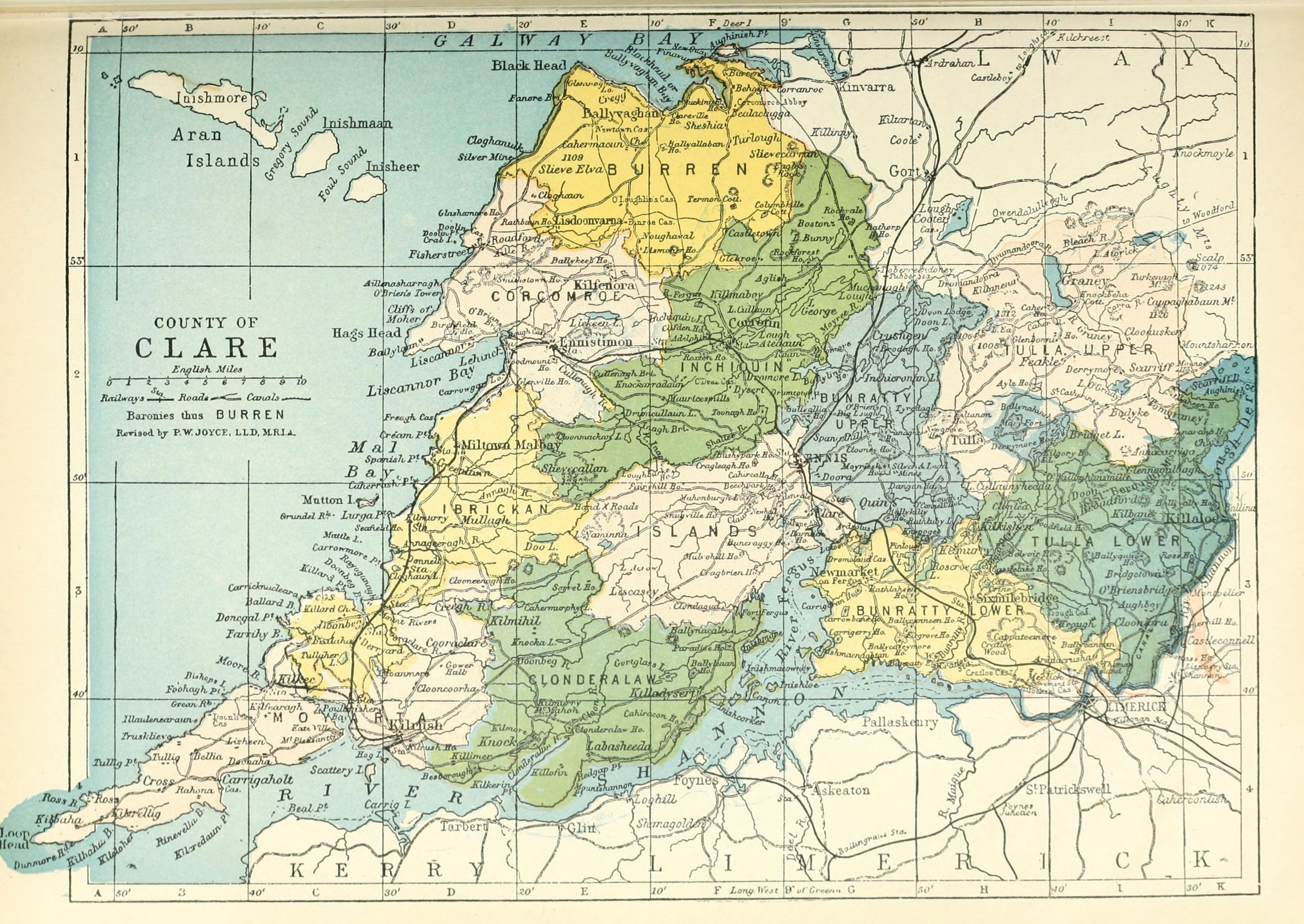
Baronies of Clare. Moyarta is in the extreme southwest.

The Barony of Moyarta is a geographical division of County Clare, Ireland, that in turn is divided into civil parishes.

== Legal context ==
Baronies were created after the Norman invasion of Ireland as divisions of counties and were used the administration of justice and the raising of revenue. While baronies continue to be officially defined units, they have been administratively obsolete since 1898. However, they continue to be used in land registration and in specification, such as in planning permissions. In many cases, a barony corresponds to an earlier Gaelic túath which had submitted to the Crown.

== Location ==
The Barony of Moyarta lies on a peninsula extending between the Atlantic Ocean to the west and the Shannon Estuary to the south, terminating at the point of Loop Head. On the north it is bound by the barony of Ibrickane and on the east by the barony of Clonderalaw. It covers 83,151 acres (33,650 ha) of which 14,472 acres (5,857 ha) are tideway of the Shannon. The land is rugged, containing much bog and moor.

== Parishes and settlements ==
The barony holds the old castles of Doonlickey, Carrigaholt, Scattery, Cloghansevan, and Knocknagarhoon. It contains the parishes of Kilballyowen, Kilfearagh, Kilrush and Moyarta, and part of the parish of Kilmacduane. The main settlements are Kilrush, Cross, Kilbaha, Kilballyhone, Kiltrellig, Ross, Tullig, Kilkee, Cooraclare, Bellina, Carrigaholt, Doonaha, and Lisheen.
