= Moyarta =

Civil parish in County Clare, Ireland

Moyarta Maigh Fhearta
- Civil parish
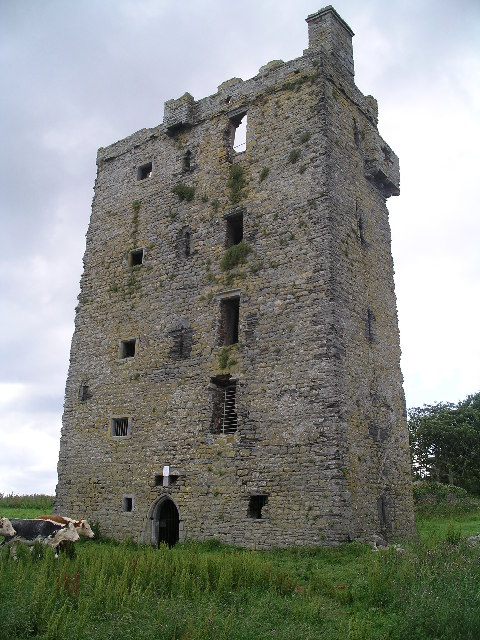
- Carrigaholt Castle

- Location in Ireland
- Coordinates: 52.608733°N 9.730508°W
- Country: Ireland
- Province: Munster
- County: County Clare
- Time zone: UTC+0 (WET)
  - Summer (DST): UTC-1 (IST (WEST))

Moyarta (Irish: Maigh Fhearta) is a civil parish in County Clare, Ireland. It lies on the Loop Head peninsula between the Atlantic Ocean and the Shannon Estuary. The parish contains the villages of Carrigaholt and Doonaha.

== Location ==
The parish of Moyarta is situated in the barony of Moyarta of the same name on the Loop peninsula. It has land borders with two parishes - Kilballyowen to the west and Kilfearagh to the east. To the north of the peninsula is the Atlantic Ocean with the Shannon Estuary on the opposide side. It is 7.25 by 3.75 miles (11.67 by 6.04 km) and covered 15,613 acres (6,318 ha).

The Atlantic coast is high and rocky and includes the small headlands of Castle-Point and Foohagh-Point. A large part of the surface is bog or moorland. The Moyarta River flows east through the parish from the parish of Kilballyowen to the head of Carrigaholt bay on the Shannon Estuary, a distance of 3 miles (4.8 km).

There are national schools, for children aged up to 12, in Carrigaholt, Doonaha, Moveen and Querrin. The civil parish contains the Catholic parish of Carrigaholt, which is sometimes also called Moyarta, and part of the Catholic parish of Cross. From at least 1704 the parishes of Moyarta and Kilballyowen were united, served by one priest. In 1878 they were divided again. The Church of the Blessed Virgin Mary, built in 1832-33, is in Carrigaholt. The Church of the Holy Spirit, built in 1808, is in Doonaha.

== Antiquities ==
The name of the parish, Magh Fearta, means the Plain of the Graves. The graveyard of Moyarta has never contained a church. There are the ruins of two churches in the townland of Kilcredaun, Teampul Shearlais and Teampul-an-aird. The second has no cemetery. There is a holy well not far away called Tobar Cradaun, apparently dedicated to a Saint Caritán. Its water comes from a cliff face, and at high tide it is covered by the sea. The church of Kilcrony, with its graveyard and holy well, are in the townland of Lisheencrony. It is not known which of the various virgin saints named Croiné this church commemorate.

The list of castles in Thomond of 1580 names four in the parish, all the property of Turlogh MacMahon. The first is Carrigaholt, the main seat of the MacMahons Lords of West Corcabaskin, beautifully situated on Carrigaholt bay. The others are Dunlicky, and two castles that have been leveled to the ground, Moyarta and Knocknagarhoon. The ruins of Knocknagarhoon and Doonlickey Castles look over the Atlantic coast.

== Notable people ==
- Eugene O'Curry (1796–1862), an Irish philologist, historian and archaeologist, was born in Doonaha.

== Townlands ==
Townlands are Bellia, Breaghva, Cammoge, Carrownaweelaun, Clarefield, Cloonconeen, Doonaha East, Doonaha West, Furroor Lower, Furroor Upper, Kilcasheen, Kilcredaun, Killeenagh, Killinny, Knocknagarhoon, Lisheencrony, Lisheenfurroor, Moveen East, Moveen West, Moyarta East, Moyarta West, Newtown East, Newtown West, Querrin, Rahaniska, Rahona East, Rahona West, Rinemackaderrig, Shanganagh, Trusklieve, Tullaroe and Tullig.

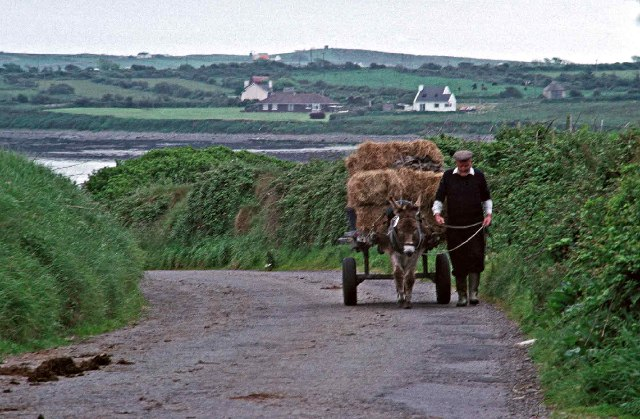
Farmer near Carrigaholt in 1992

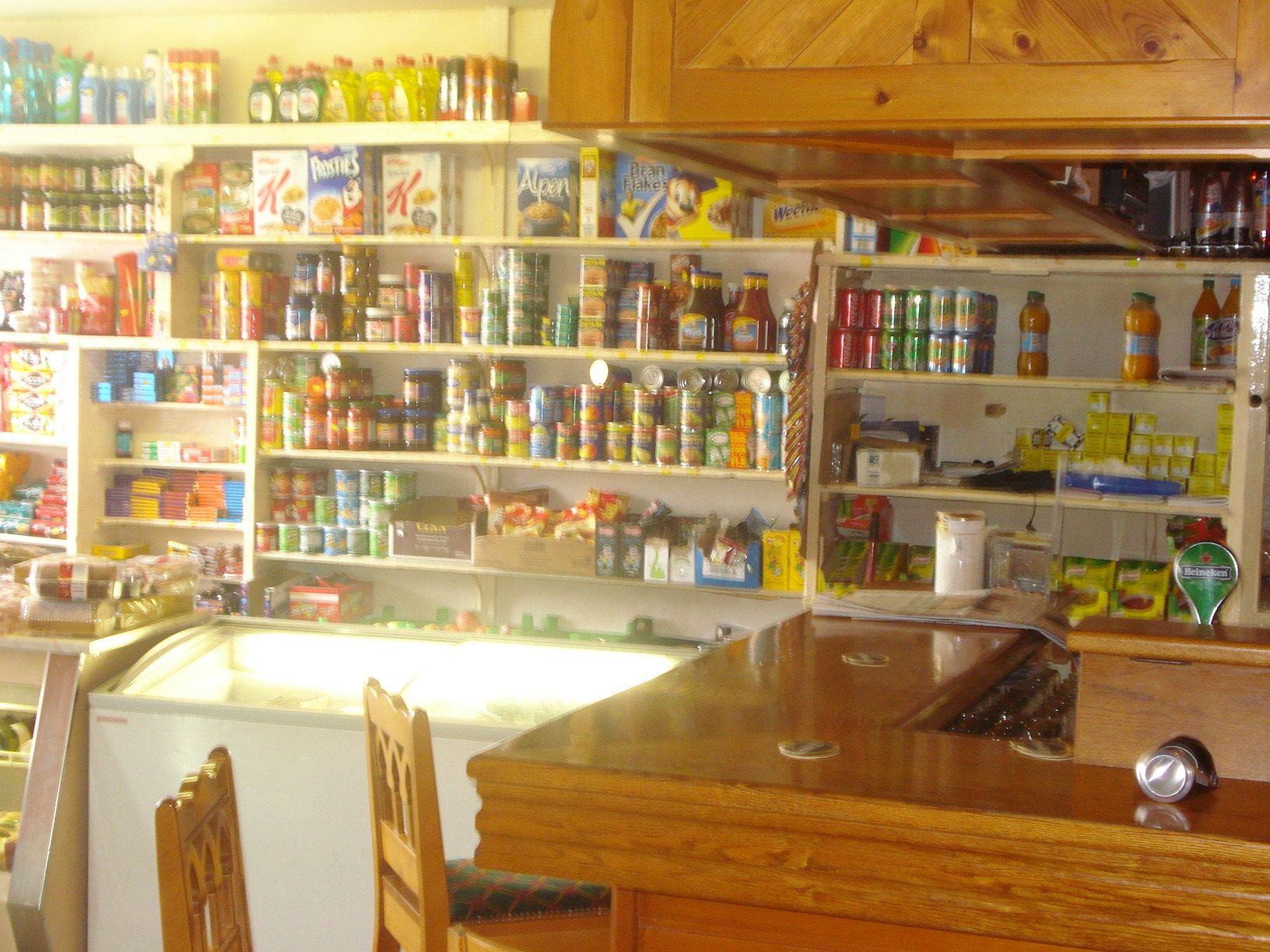
Interior of a pub in Carrigaholt that also serves as a shop
