= Kilballyowen =

Parish in County Clare, Ireland

Kilballyowen Cill Bhaile Eoghain
- Civil parish
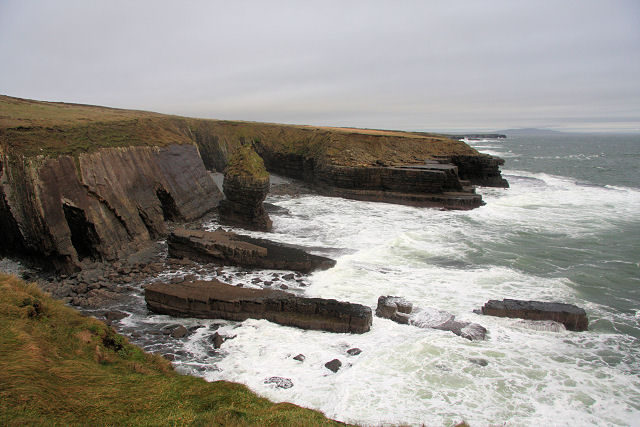
- Aillnagreagh, a rocky inlet on the south side of Loop Head

- Location in Ireland
- Coordinates: 52°35′55.12″N 9°46′15.67″W
- Country: Ireland
- Province: Munster
- County: County Clare
- Elevation: 45 m (148 ft)
- Time zone: UTC+0 (WET)
  - Summer (DST): UTC-1 (IST (WEST))
- Irish Grid Reference: Q807509

Kilballyowen (Irish: Cill Bhaile Eoghain) is the name of both a civil parish and a townland within that parish in County Clare, Ireland. The name is also occasionally used for the slightly larger Catholic parish of Cross.

Kilballowen parish is located at the end of the Loop Head Peninsula which extends into the Atlantic Ocean to the north of the Shannon Estuary. The parish contains the villages of Cross and Kilbaha. On the first edition Ordnance Survey of Ireland map of 1840, other settlements in the parish such as Ross, Trusklieve and Tullig were marked as villages, but depopulation during and after the Great Famine have rendered these settlements relatively insignificant today.

== Location ==
The parish is part of the historical barony of Moyarta. It is 7 by 5 miles (11.3 by 8.0 km) and covers 10,835 acres (4,385 ha). It has a land border with only one parish - the eponymous Moyarta of the same barony. Kilballyowen is 13 miles (21 km) west of Kilrush.

Cliffs rise to 386 feet (118 m) at a point 1.5 miles (2.4 km) to the west of Rinevella bay. As of 1845 the parish held the ruins of a church and a friary. The old castle of Cloghaunsavaun (sometimes spelled Clehansevan) was blown down by a violent storm in 1802. In 1580 the castle of Cloghaunsavaun belonged to Turlogh MacMahon of Carrigaholt.

== Townlands ==
Townlands in the civil parish are Cloghaunbeg, Cloghaunsavaun, Cross, Feeard, Fodry, Kilbaha North, Kilbaha South, Kilballyowen, Kilcloher, Kiltrellig, Lissalougha, Moneen, Oughterard, Quilty, Rehy East, Rehy West, Ross, Tullig and Trusklieve.

== Villages ==
Cross village is inland, between Loophead and Kilkee and 2 miles (3.2 km) from Carrigaholt. Cross is home of the local Gaelic Athletic Association (GAA) club. The GAA football club of Naomh Eoin was founded on 6 January 1974. It is based at Pairc Eoin. The village of Kilbaha is on Kilbaha Bay, another small fishing village.

== Catholic parish ==
The village of Cross gives its name to the Catholic parish of Cross in the Roman Catholic Diocese of Killaloe. The parish churches are Our Lady of Lourdes in Cross and St. John the Baptist in Kilbaha, also known as the Church of the Little Ark. There are two holy wells in the parish, Tobar Cuain at Kiltrellig, and Tobar Senán at Kilcloher.
