= Kilbaha =

Village in County Clare, Ireland

Kilbaha Cill Bheathach
- Village
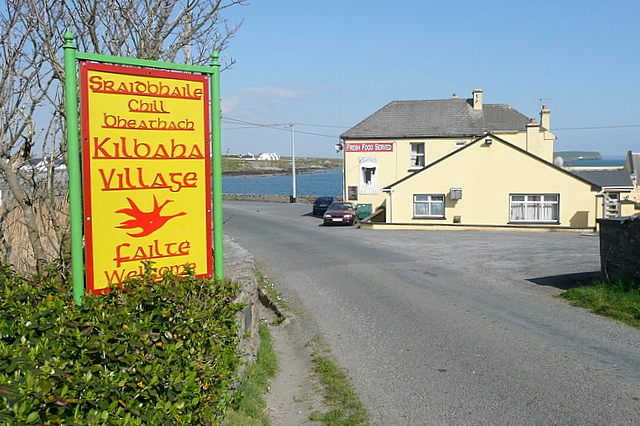
- The village is on the south coast of the Loop Head peninsula

- Location in Ireland
- Coordinates: 52°34′15″N 9°51′39″W
- Country: Ireland
- Province: Munster
- County: Clare
- Elevation: 7 m (23 ft)
- Time zone: UTC+0 (WET)
  - Summer (DST): UTC-1 (IST (WEST))

Kilbaha (Irish: Cill Bheathach, meaning 'church of the birches') is a small fishing village in County Clare, Ireland. It is located close to the western end of the Loop Head peninsula on the R487 road.

== History ==
According to Parliamentary Gazetteer of Ireland 1845 the village had a population of 460 in 1831, and 531 in 1841. It is situated on the Shannon Estuary, about 3.75 miles (6.04 km) east of Loop Head, and about 21 miles (34 km) west of Kilrush. A small open sweep of the estuary at the place is sometimes called Kilbaha bay.

== Location and transport ==
Kilbaha is in the parish of Cross in the Roman Catholic Diocese of Killaloe. The parish churches are Our Lady of Lourdes in Cross and the Star of the Sea church in Kilbaha (incorrectly described on the diocesan website as the Church of St John the Baptist.) The village is near the tip of the Loop Head peninsula.

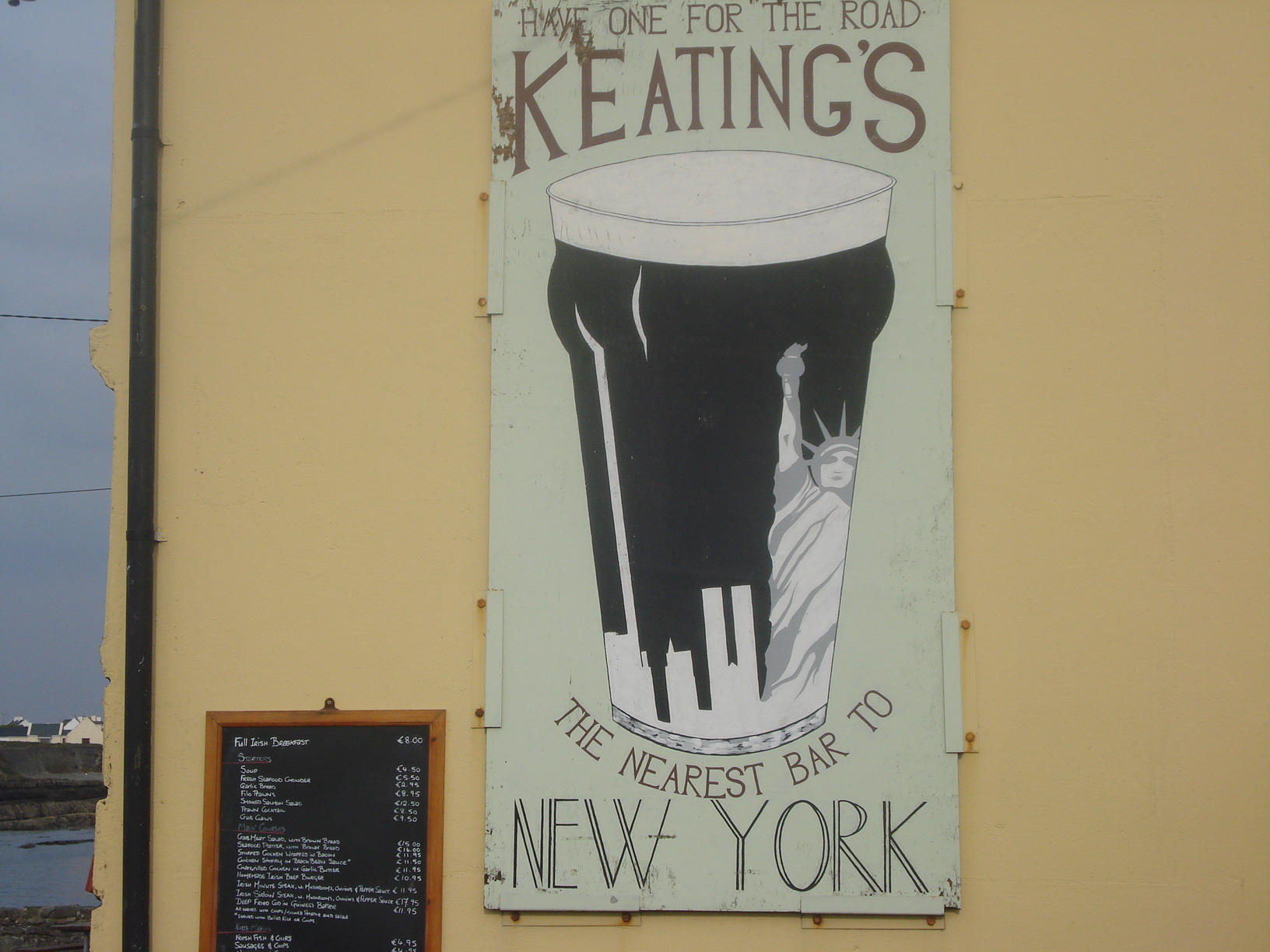
Keating's pub

It is surrounded by the waters of the Atlantic Ocean and the River Shannon. It is a place of outstanding natural beauty. The local pub Keating's claims to be the nearest pub to New York City.

== Awards ==
Kilbaha and its setting on the Loop Head peninsula on the west coast of Clare was the winner of a European Destinations of Excellence Award 2010 for Aquatic Tourism.

== See also ==
- List of towns and villages in Ireland
