= Carrigaholt (parish) =

Catholic parish in County Clare, Ireland

- Roman Catholic parish
- Location in Ireland
- Coordinates: 52°36′0″N 9°42′0″W
- Country: Ireland
- Province: Munster
- County: County Clare
- Time zone: UTC+0 (WET)
  - Summer (DST): UTC-1 (IST (WEST))

Carrigaholt is a parish in County Clare, Ireland, and part of the Cois Fharraige grouping of parishes within the Roman Catholic Diocese of Killaloe.

The history of the parish is a complicated one. In the time of Father Michael Meehan (1810-1878) Loop Head formed just one parish under the name of "Moyarta and Kilballyowen". Before 1817 it was known as Kilballyowen. In 1878 it was split into the parishes of Cross (western part of the peninsula) and Carrigaholt (eastern part of the peninsula). That recreated the medieval parishes in that area.

The main church of the parish is the Church of the Blessed Virgin Mary in Carrigaholt. The site for this church was donated by the local landlord Francis N. Burton. The cruciform church was built in the period 1832–1834.

The second church of the parish is the Church of the Holy Spirit in Doonaha. This church was built in 1808.

The parish contains ruins of several very old churches. According to Westropp the church ruins in Kilcredaun are from the 10th/11th century. The church in Kilcrony is already mentioned in a listing from 1390.

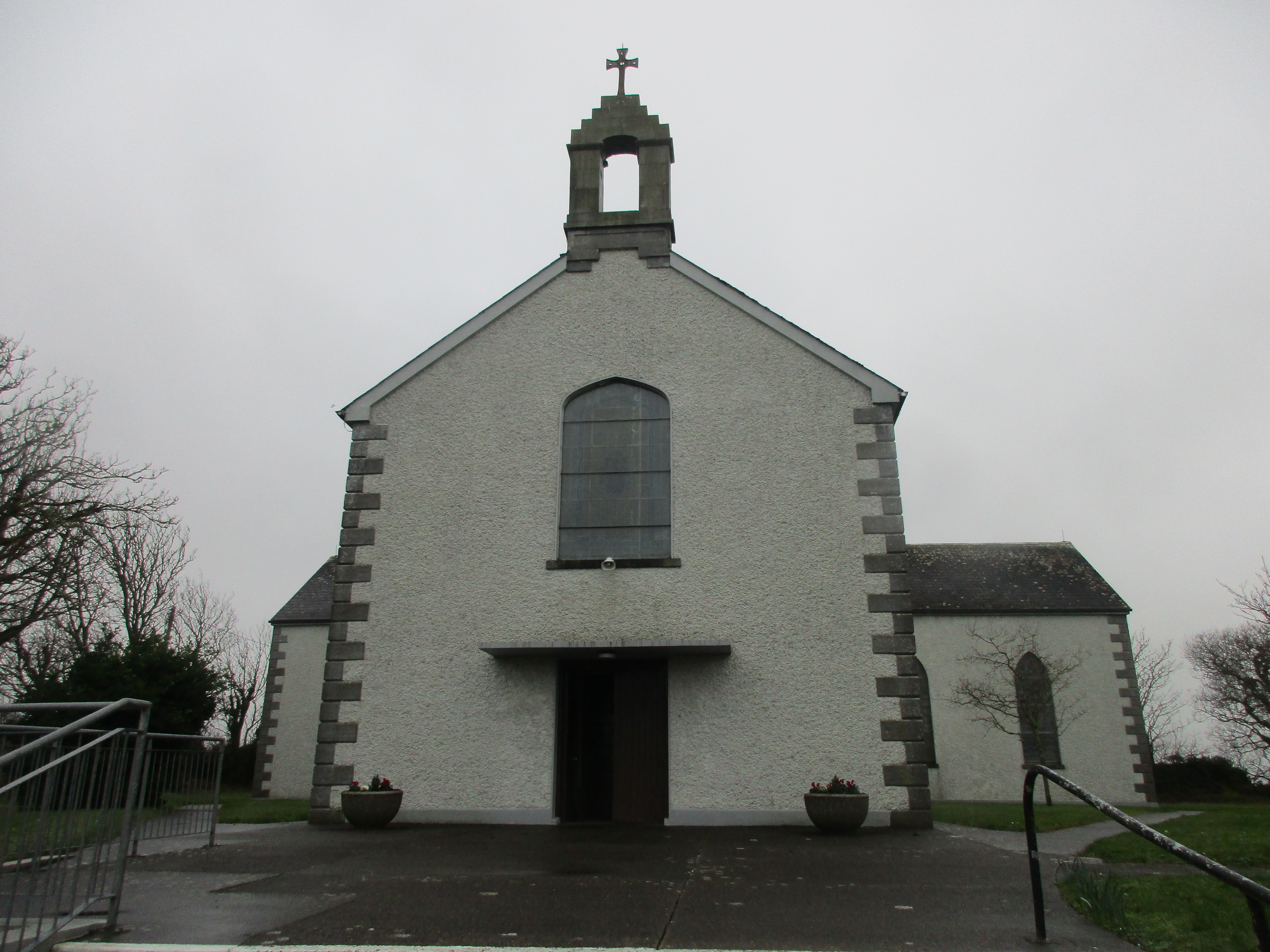
Church of the Blessed Virgin Mary in Carrigaholt

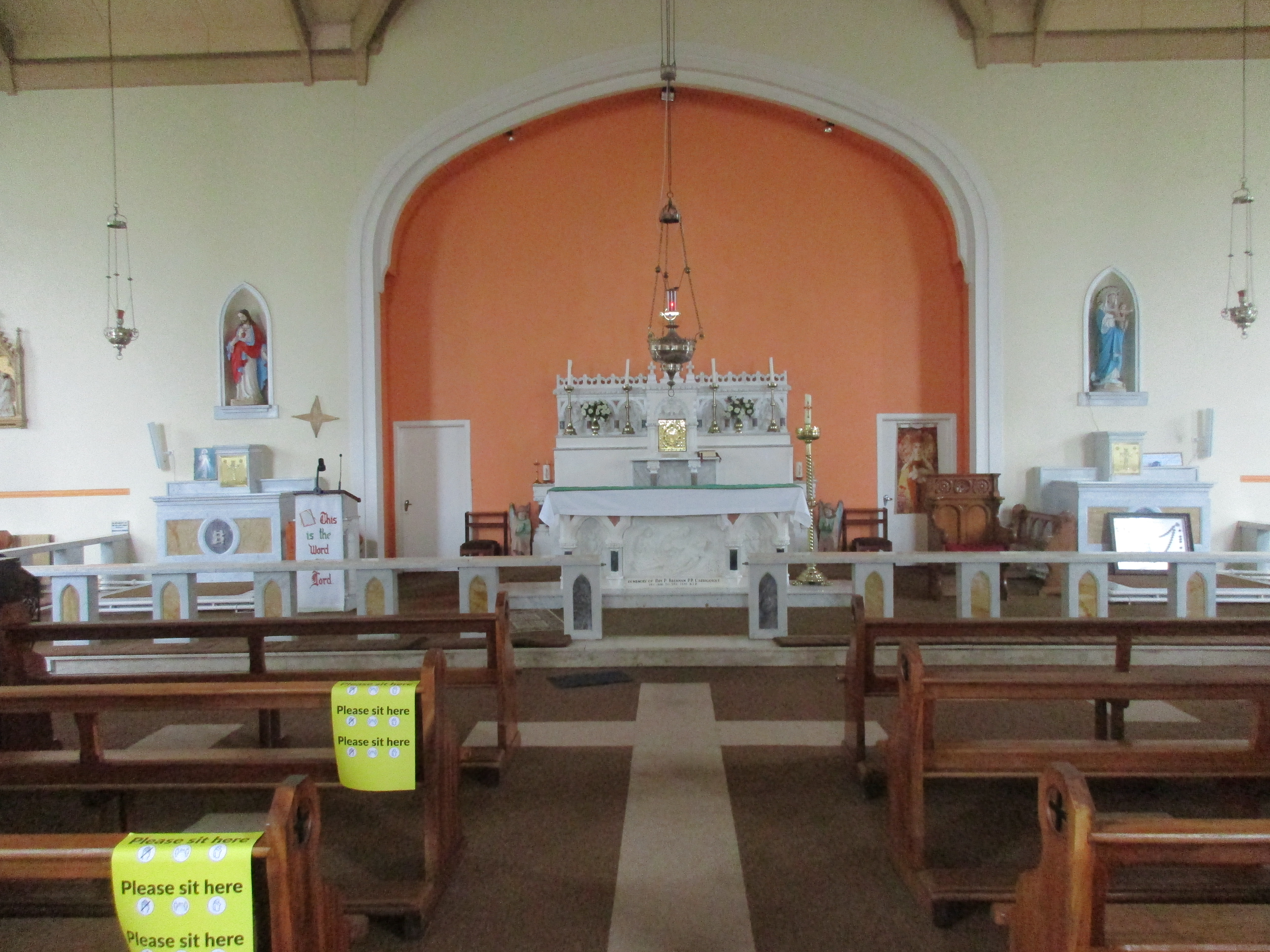
Altar of Carrigaholt Church in pandemic times (2022)

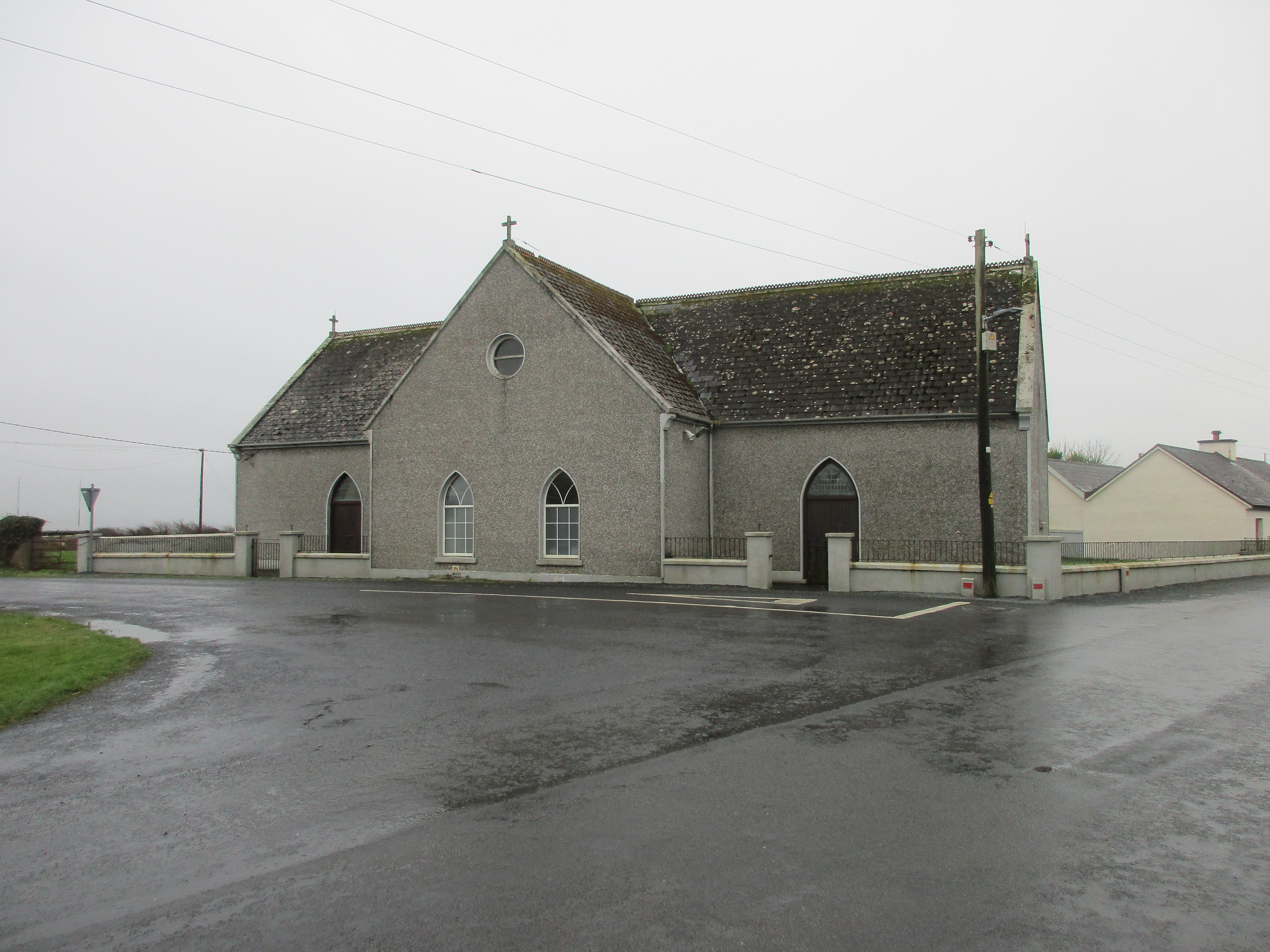
Church of the Holy Spirit in Doonaha

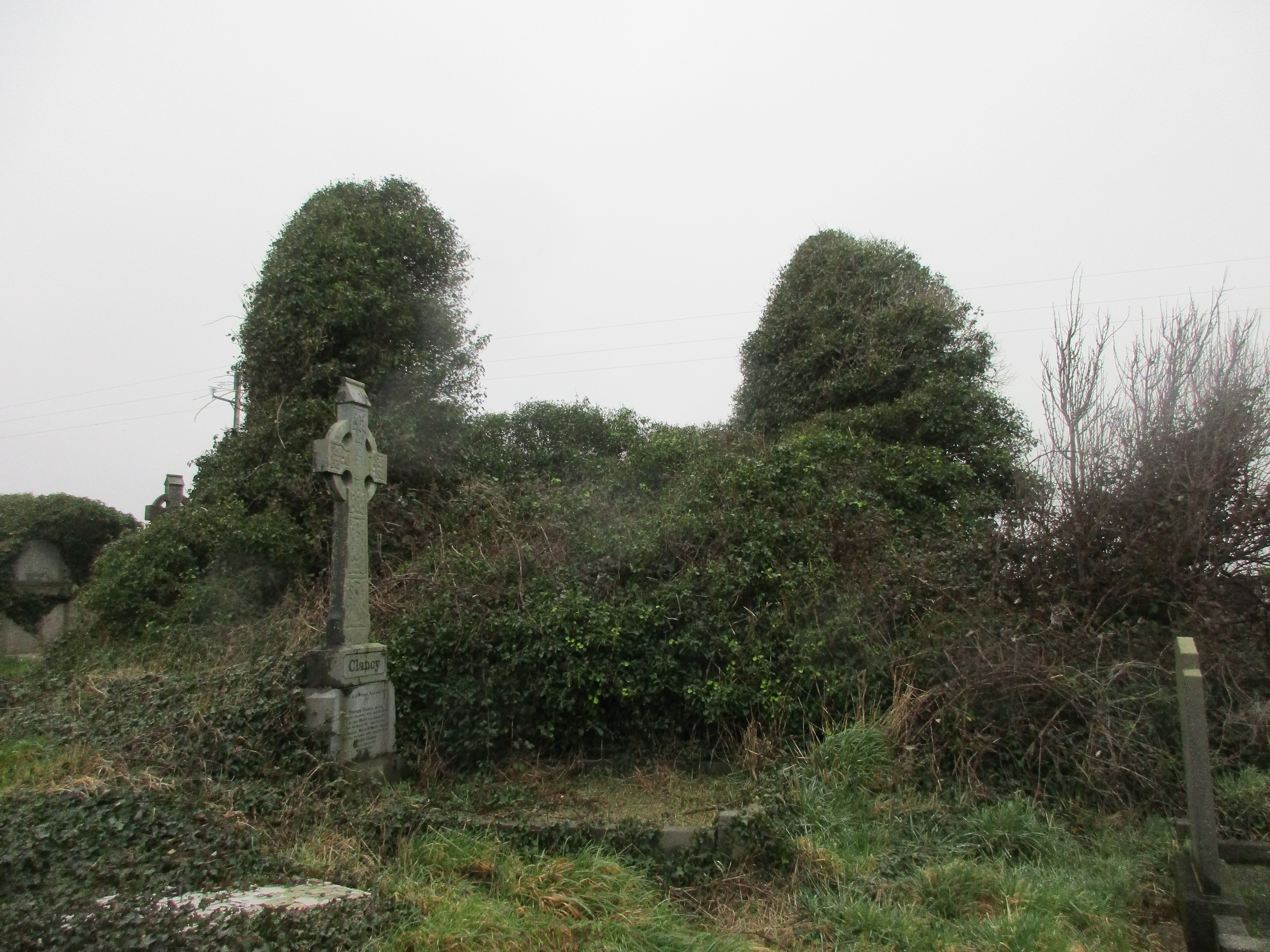
Kilcrony Church
