= Cross (parish) =

Catholic parish in County Clare, Ireland

- Roman Catholic parish
- Location in Ireland
- Coordinates: 52°35′55.12″N 9°46′15.67″W
- Country: Ireland
- Province: Munster
- County: County Clare
- Time zone: UTC+0 (WET)
  - Summer (DST): UTC-1 (IST (WEST))

Cross, also named Cross (Kilballyowen) is a parish in County Clare, Ireland, and part of the Cois Fharraige grouping of parishes within the Roman Catholic Diocese of Killaloe.

The history of the parish is a complicated one. In the time of father Michael Meehan (1810-1878) Loop Head formed just one parish under the name of "Moyarta and Kilballyowen". Before 1817 it was known as Kilballyowen. In 1878 it was split into the parishes of Carrigaholt (eastern part of the peninsula) and Cross (western part of the peninsula). That recreated the medieval parishes in that area.

== Churches ==
The main church of the parish is the Our Lady Of Lourdes Church in Cross. This church was built in 1958 as a replacement for an older church built in 1806.

The second church of the parish is the Our Lady Star of the Sea Church in Mooneen, Kilbaha. This church was built in 1857. It replaced the much fabled Little Ark of Kilbaha, ran by Michael Meehan (1810-1878).

=== The Little Ark of Kilbaha (1852-1857) ===
The Little Ark was effectively a mobile church, devised to circumvent the absolute refusal by the landlord Nicolas Westby and his agent Marcus Keane to allow a church near Kilbaha. In fact, Keane tried to sabotage any Catholic worship. A makeshift church in two cabins was quickly demolished by him. After the demolition, Fr. Meehan said mass under sheet covered tilted shafts of farmer carts but that was no success. Then he came with the idea of the mobile church, similar to the bathing boxes in use at Kilkee at that time. At first the Ark was parked alongside a public road that was outside Keane's control. But the harassment-campaign went on and Fr. Meehan was prosecuted for creating a nuisance on the public road. Meehan won this case. Then he moved the cart to the foreshore, off the public road. Below the high watermark, the beach was free land. Keane did not stop and he went after the tenants who stored The Little Ark by evicting them and demolish their houses.

In the end Marcus Keane gave in as a trade off to securing the catholic vote to Lord Francis Conyngham in parliamentary election in 1857. At 12 July 1857 the foundation of the new church, in the townland Moveen near Kilbaha, was blessed by bishop Daniel Vaughan. The Little Ark is now on display in a side room of the Our Lady Star of the Sea Church.

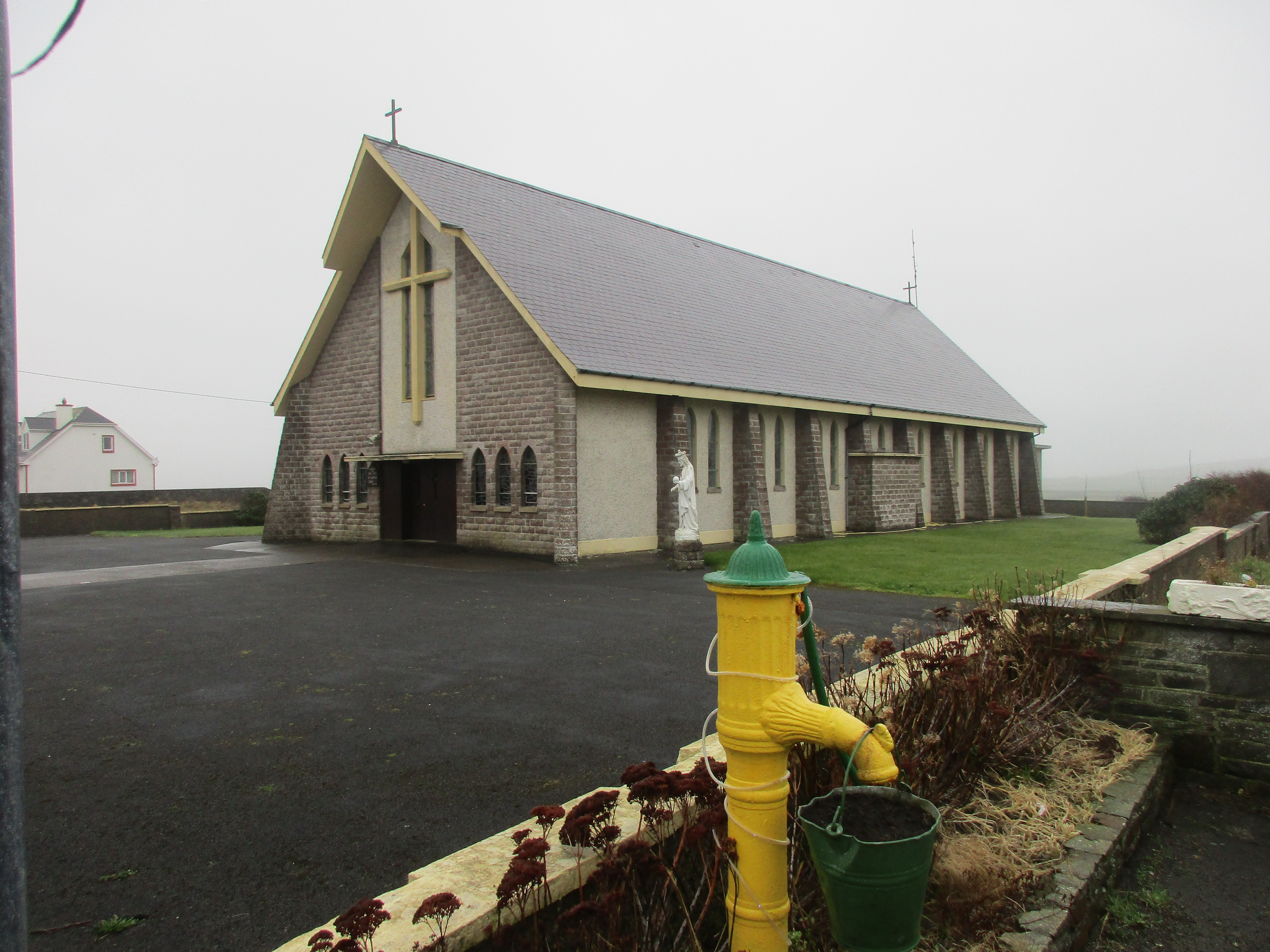
Our Lady Of Lourdes Church in Cross with the Village Pump

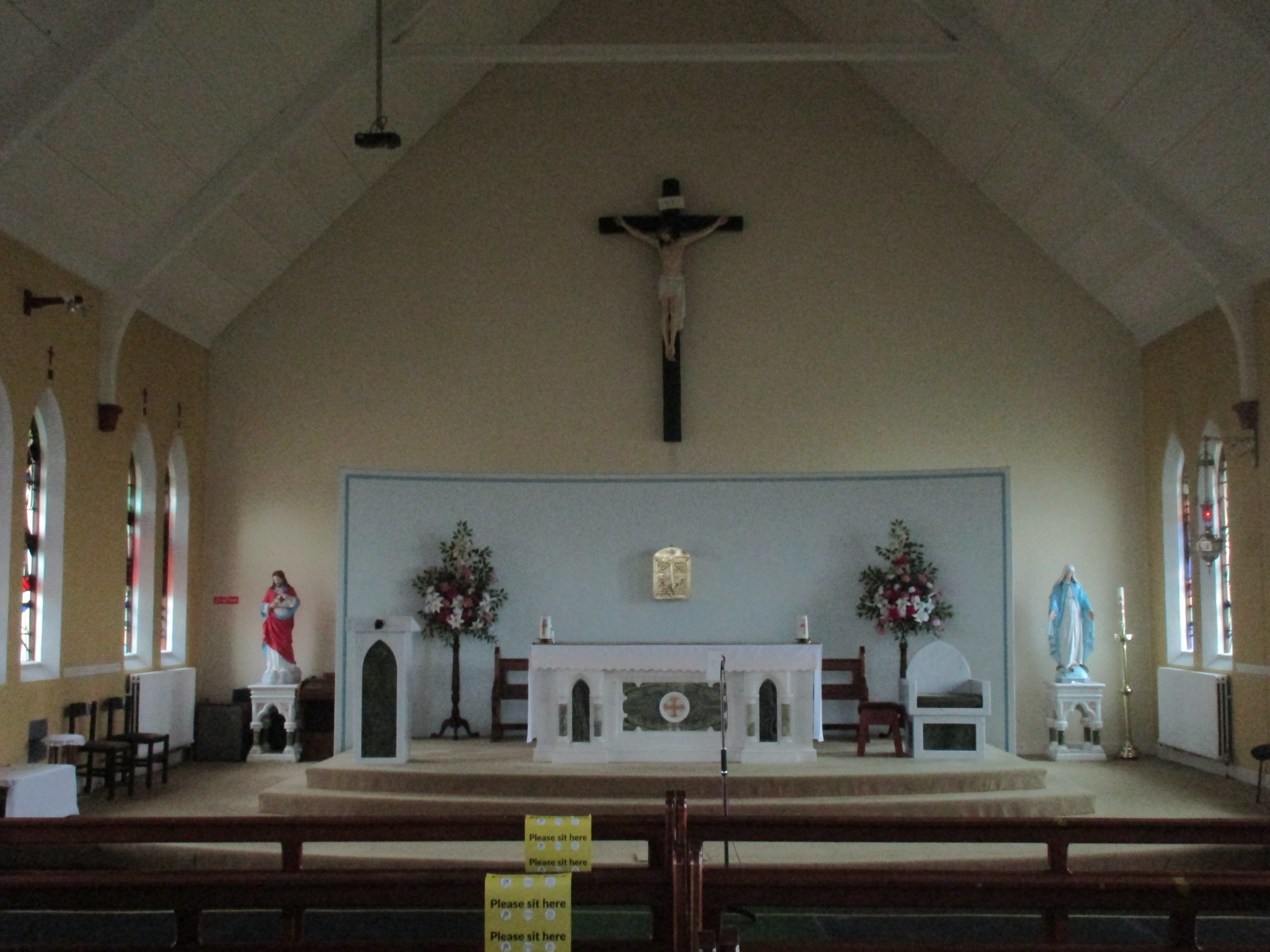
The altar of Our Lady Of Lourdes Church

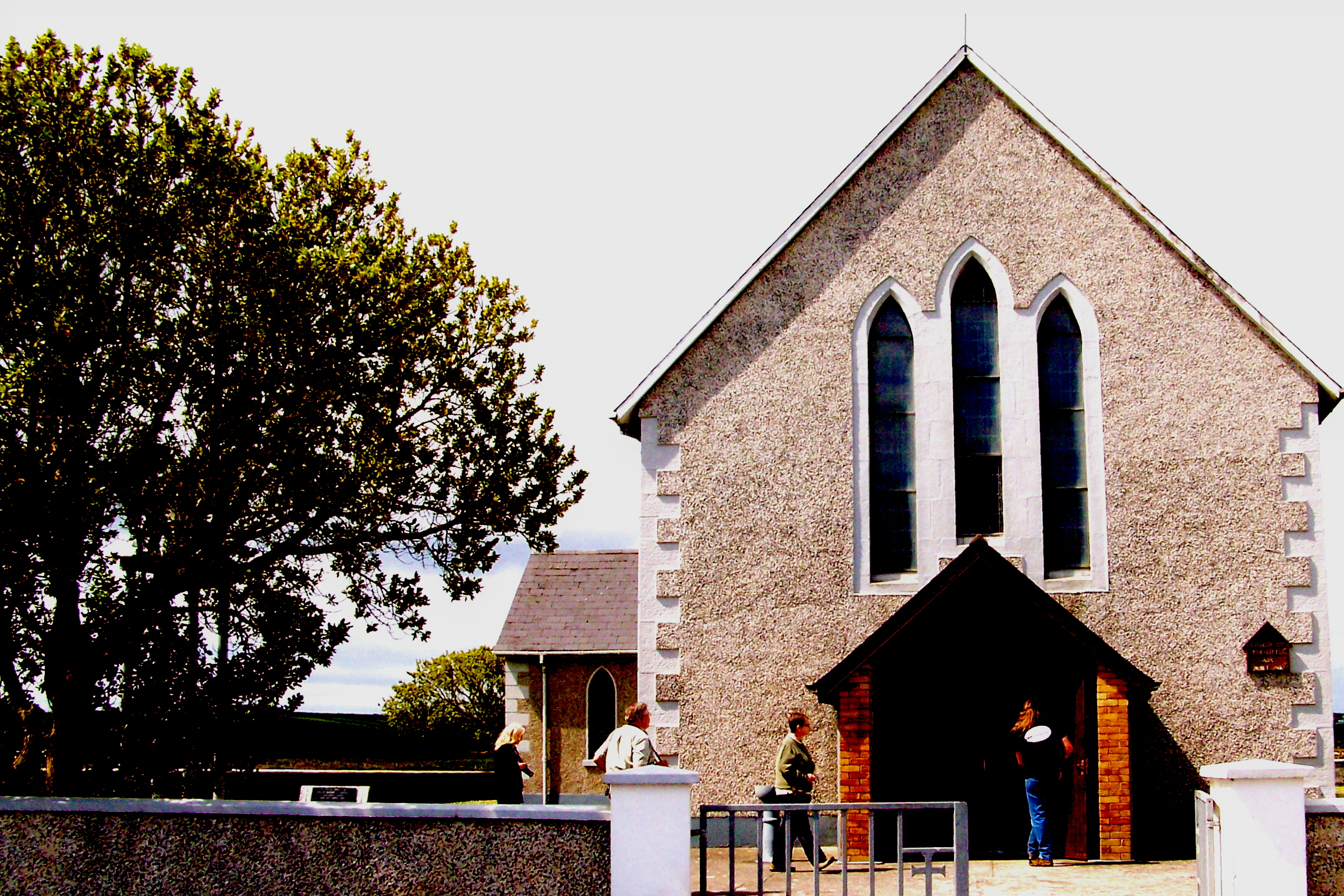
Our Lady Star of the Sea Church in Mooneen, Kilbaha. Also known as "Church of the Little Ark".

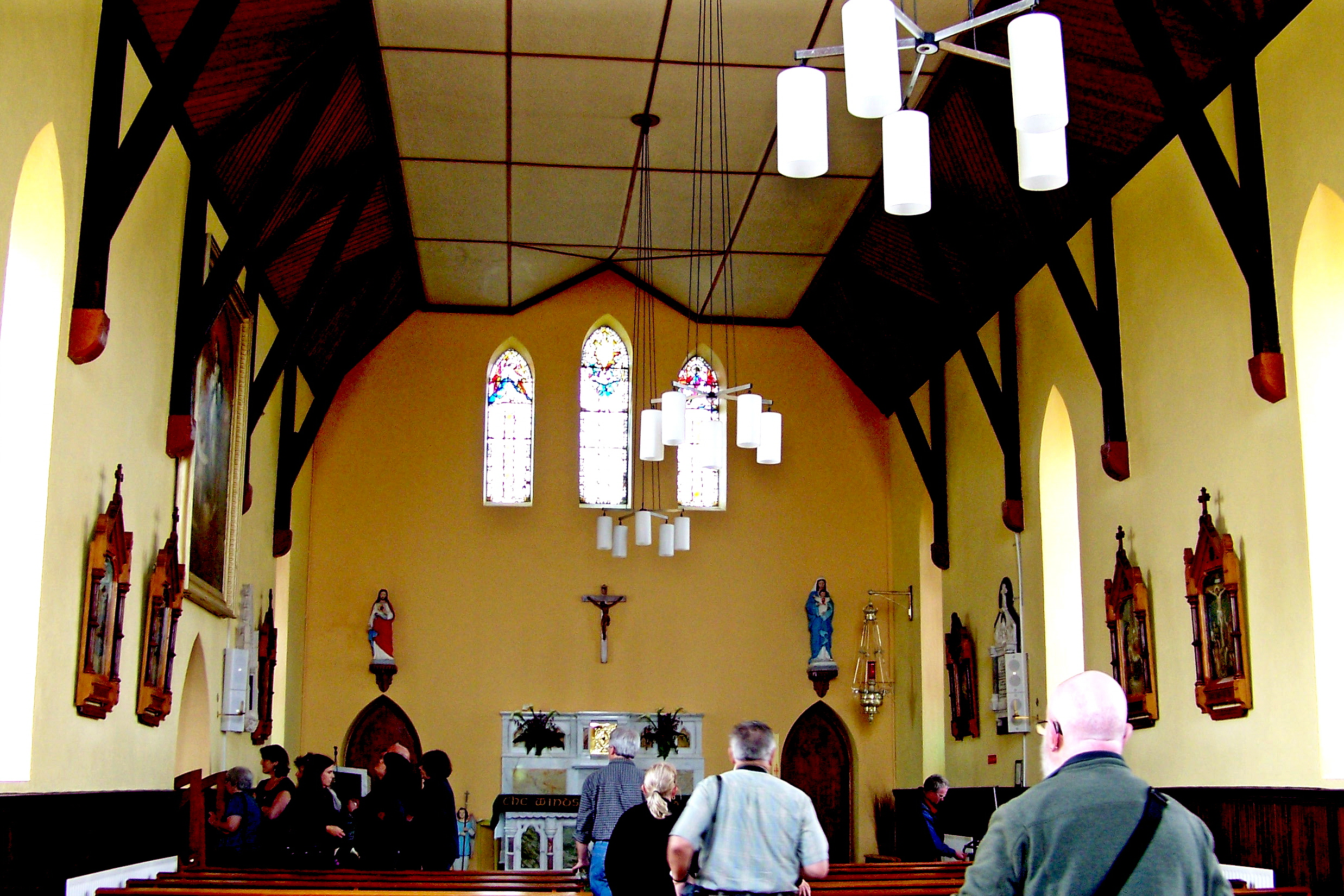
Altar of the Our Lady Star of the Sea Church

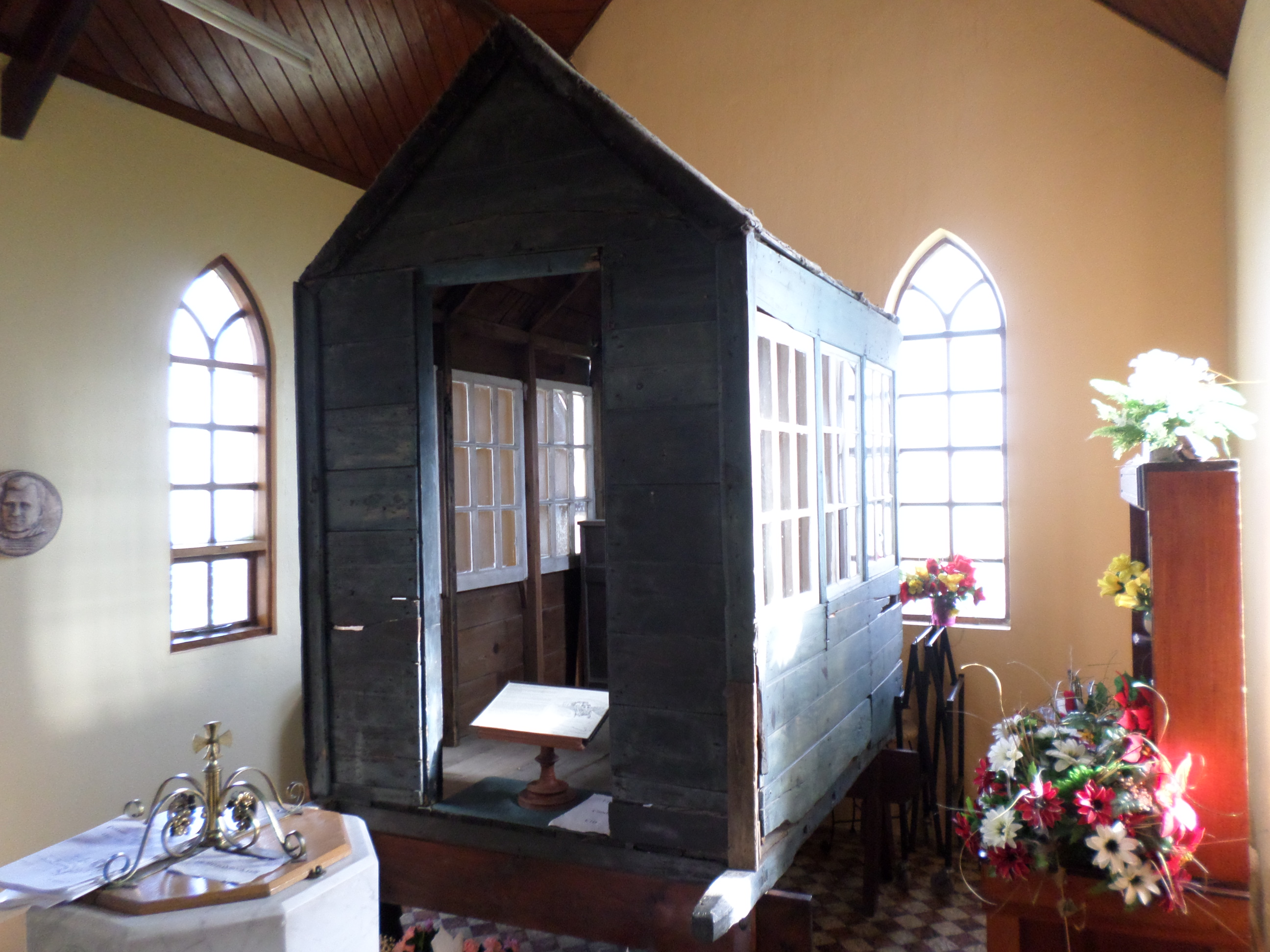
The Little Ark of Kilbaha
