= Cross, County Clare =

Village in County Clare, Ireland

Cross An Chrois
- Village
- Location in Ireland
- Coordinates: 52°35′55.12″N 9°46′15.67″W
- Country: Ireland
- Province: Munster
- County: County Clare
- Elevation: 45 m (148 ft)
- Time zone: UTC+0 (WET)
  - Summer (DST): UTC-1 (IST (WEST))
- Irish Grid Reference: Q807509

Cross (Irish: An Chrois) is a townland and small village in County Clare, Ireland. It is in the Catholic parish of Cross.

== Location ==
The village of Cross is located on the Loop Head Peninsula, west of Carrigaholt on the road to Kilbaha. It is the civil parish of Kilballyowen. The name could be derived from a cross related to the old church of Killballyowen. It is more likely that the village is named after a once important road crossing as Cross is located in the center of the Loop Head Peninsula.

== Facilities ==
Cross is home of the local Gaelic Athletic Association (GAA) club. The GAA football club of Naomh Eoin was founded on 6 January 1974. It is based at Pairc Eoin. The village gives its name to the parish of Cross (Kilballyowen) in the Roman Catholic Diocese of Killaloe. Cross contains the parish church of Our Lady of Lourdes.

== See also ==
- List of towns and villages in Ireland
