= Tullig =

Tullig (Irish: Túllaig, meaning 'a hill') can refer to:

- Tullig (County Clare) - small village in County Clare at the Loop Head peninsula
- Tullig (County Kerry) - townland in County Kerry
- Tullig (County Cork) - townland in County Cork
