= Doonaha =

Village in County Clare, Ireland

Doonaha Dún Átha
- Village
- Location in Ireland
- Coordinates: 52°37′21.62″N 9°38′47.64″W
- Country: Ireland
- Province: Munster
- County: County Clare
- Elevation: 22 m (72 ft)
- Time zone: UTC+0 (WET)
  - Summer (DST): UTC-1 (IST (WEST))
- Irish Grid Reference: Q890540

Doonaha (Irish: Dún Átha) is a small village on the Loop Head peninsula in County Clare, Ireland. It is located along the R487 road and close to the banks of the River Shannon.

The Doonaha Battery was the northern part of the defences of the Shannon River. His counterpart is the Corran Point battery on the southern banks. The Doonaha Battery is severely eroded and has lost its cannons.

The village is part of the Catholic parish of Carrigaholt. The Church of the Holy Spirit, Doonaha was built in 1808 and is one of the oldest churches in the Killaloe diocese.

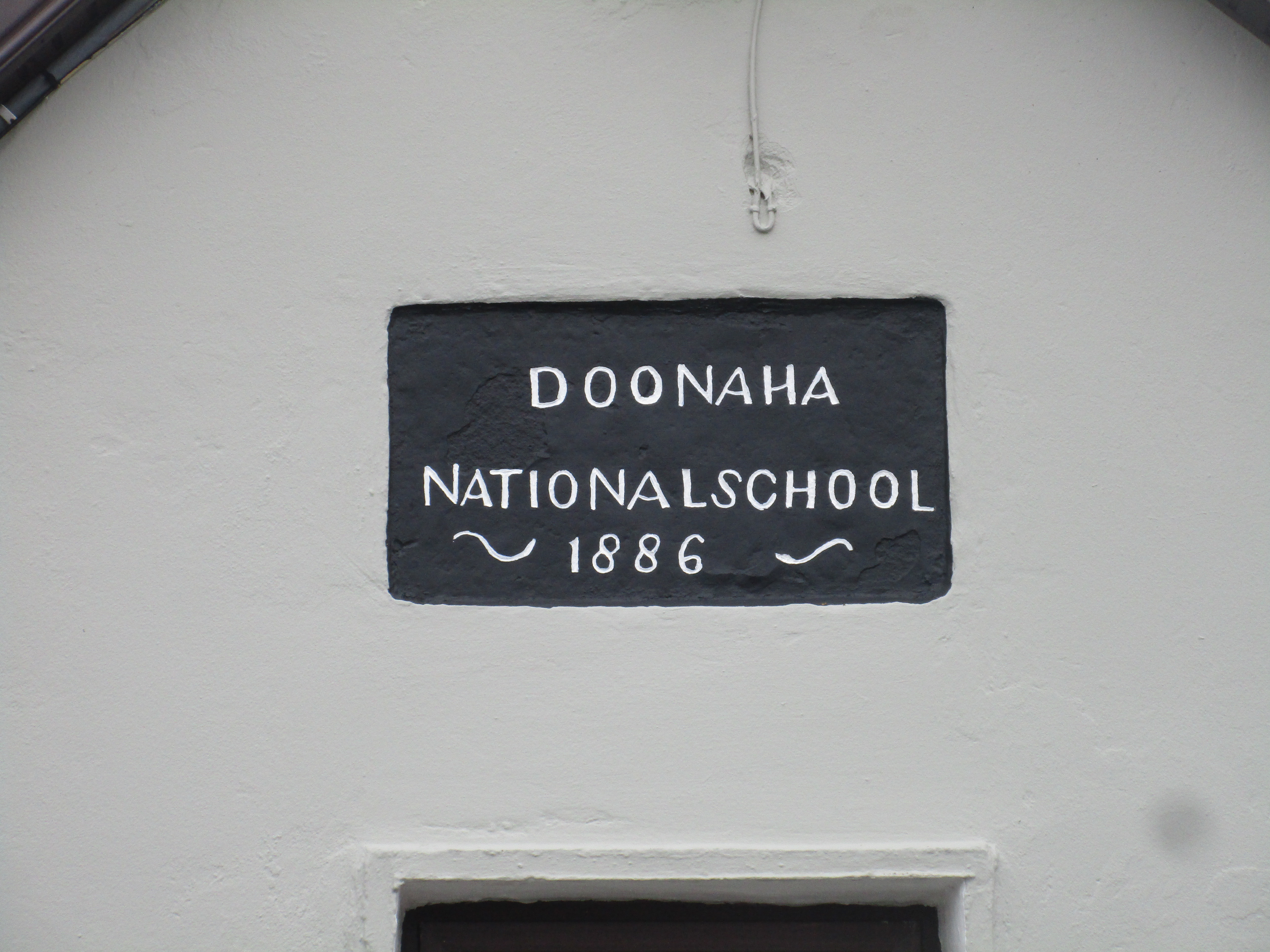
Plaque Doonaha National School

Doonaha National School was built in 1886.

== Notable people ==
- Eugene O'Curry, historian
- Pat Roche, Irish dancer

== See also ==
- List of towns and villages in Ireland
