= Eugene O'Curry =

Irish philologist & antiquary (1794–1862)

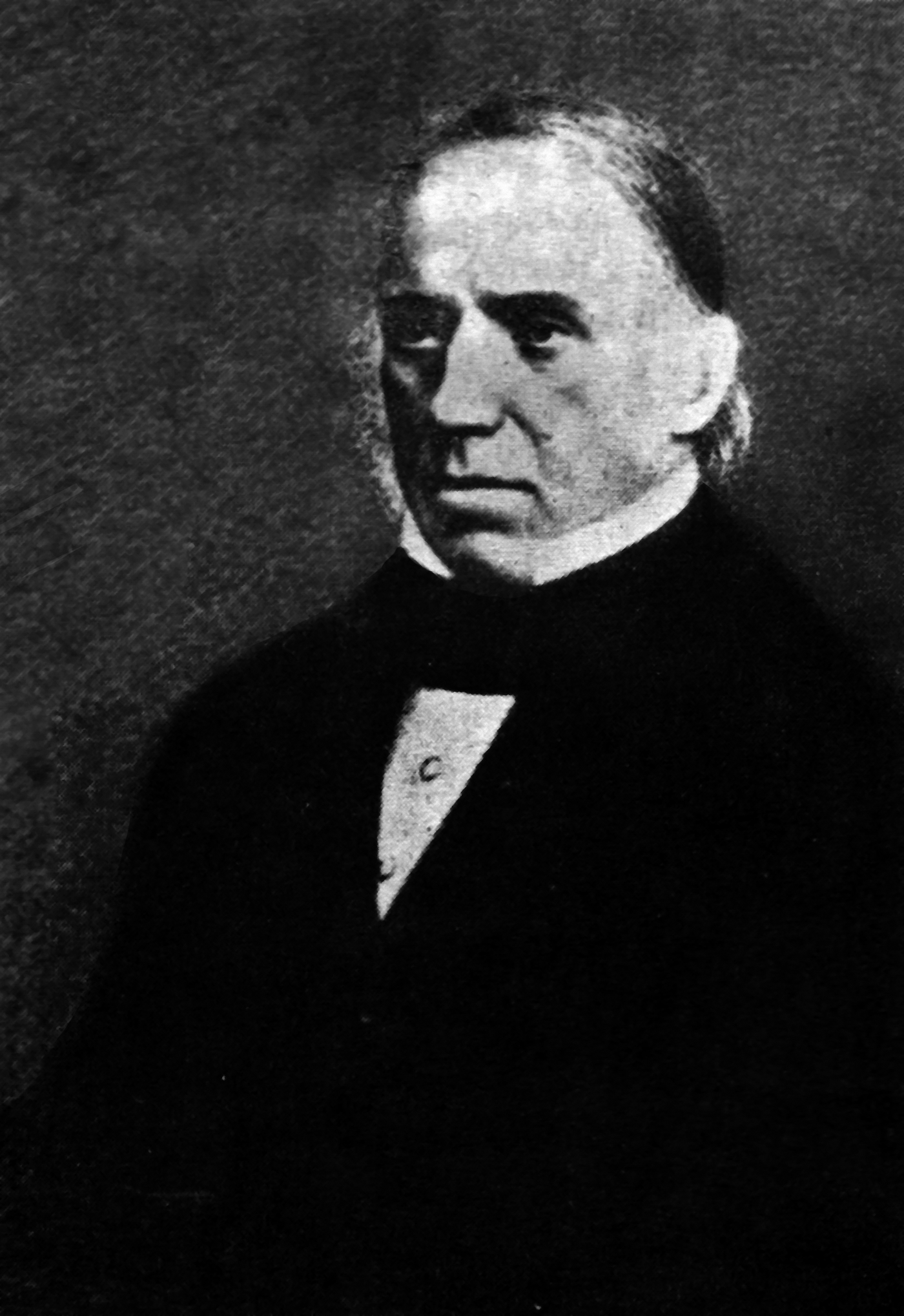
- Photograph taken of Eugene Curry circa. 1850.
- Born: 20 November 1794; Doonaha, near Carrigaholt, County Clare, Ireland
- Died: 30 July 1862 (aged 67); Dublin, Ireland
- Occupation: Scholar

Eugene O'Curry (Irish: Eoghan Ó Comhraí or Eoghan Ó Comhraidhe, 20 November 1794 – 30 July 1862) was an Irish philologist and antiquary.

== Life ==
He was born at Doonaha, near Carrigaholt, County Clare, the son of Eoghan Ó Comhraí, a farmer, and his wife Cáit. Eoghan had spent some time as a travelling pedlar and had developed an interest in Irish folklore and traditional music. Unusually for someone of his background, he appears to have been literate, and he is known to have possessed a number of Irish manuscripts. It is likely that Eoghan was primarily responsible for his son's education.

Having spent some years working on his father's farm and as a school teacher, Eugene O'Curry moved to Limerick around 1824 and spent seven years working there at a mental hospital. He married Anne Broughton, daughter of John Broughton of Killaderry near Broadford, County Limerick on 3 October 1824. O'Curry was a supporter of Catholic Emancipation and in 1828 wrote a poem congratulating Daniel O'Connell on his election as an MP.

During this period, O'Curry was establishing a reputation for his knowledge of the Irish language and Irish history, and, by 1834, was in correspondence with the antiquary John O'Donovan. He was employed, from 1835 to 1842, on O'Donovan's recommendation, in the topographical and historical section of the Irish Ordnance Survey. O'Donovan went on to marry O'Curry's sister-in-law, Mary Anne Broughton, in 1840. O'Curry spent much of the remainder of his life in Dublin and earned his living by translating and copying Irish manuscripts; the catalogue of Irish manuscripts in the British Museum (1849) was compiled by him for a fee of £100. O'Curry was responsible for the transcripts of Irish manuscripts from which O'Donovan edited The Annals of the Four Masters between 1848 and 1851.

In 1851, he was elected a member of the Royal Irish Academy and, on the founding of the Catholic University of Ireland in 1854, he was appointed professor of Irish history and archaeology. He worked with George Petrie on the Ancient Music of Ireland (1855). In 1852, he and O'Donovan proposed the Dictionary of the Irish Language, which was eventually begun by the Royal Irish Academy in 1913 and finally completed in 1976.

His lectures were published by the university in 1860, and give a better knowledge of Irish medieval literature than can be obtained from any other source. Three other volumes of lectures were published posthumously, under the title On the Manners and Customs of the Ancient Irish (1873). His voluminous transcripts, notably eight huge volumes of ancient Irish law, testify to his unremitting industry. The Celtic Society, of the council of which he was a member, published two of his translations of medieval tales.

He died of a heart attack at his home in Dublin on 30 July 1862 and was survived by two sons and two daughters.

He is buried at Glasnevin cemetery, Dublin. O'Curry Road in the Tenters area of Dublin 8 is named in his honour. O'Curry GAA club on the Loop Head peninsula and O'Curry Street in Kilkee are also named after him.

== Works ==
- Lectures on the Manuscript Materials of Ancient Irish History, Dublin, J. Duffy, 1861
- On the Manners and Customs of the Ancient Irish, 1873
  - O'Curry, Eugene (1873), On the Manners and Customs of the Ancient Irish, vol. 1, ISBN 9780876960103
  - O'Curry, Eugene (1883), On the Manners and Customs of the Ancient Irish, vol. 2, ISBN 9780876960103
  - O'Curry, Eugene (1873), On the Manners and Customs of the Ancient Irish, vol. 3, ISBN 9780876960103

As translator

- Ancient Laws of Ireland, translated by O'Donovan, John; O'Curry, Eugene, Alexander Thom (Dublin); Longman, Green, Longman, Roberts, and Green (London)
  - Senchus Mor : Introduction to Senchus Mor, and Athgabhail; or, Law of Distress as contained in the Harleian manuscripts, vol. 1, 1865
  - Ireland (1869), Senchus Mor Part II : Law of Distress (completed); Laws of Hostage-Sureties, Fosterage, Saer-Stock Tenure. Daer-Stock Tenure, and of Social Connexions, vol. 2
  - Senchus Mor (conclusion), being the Corus Bescna or Customary Law and The Book of Aichill, vol. 3, 1873
  - Din techtugad and other selected Brehon law tracts, vol. 4, 1879
  - Uraicecht Becc and certain other selected Brehon law tracts, vol. 5, 1901
  - Glossary, vol. 6, 1901
