= Kilkee (parish) =

Catholic parish in County Clare, Ireland

Kilkee − Cill Chaoi Kilfearagh − Cill Fhiarach
- Catholic parish
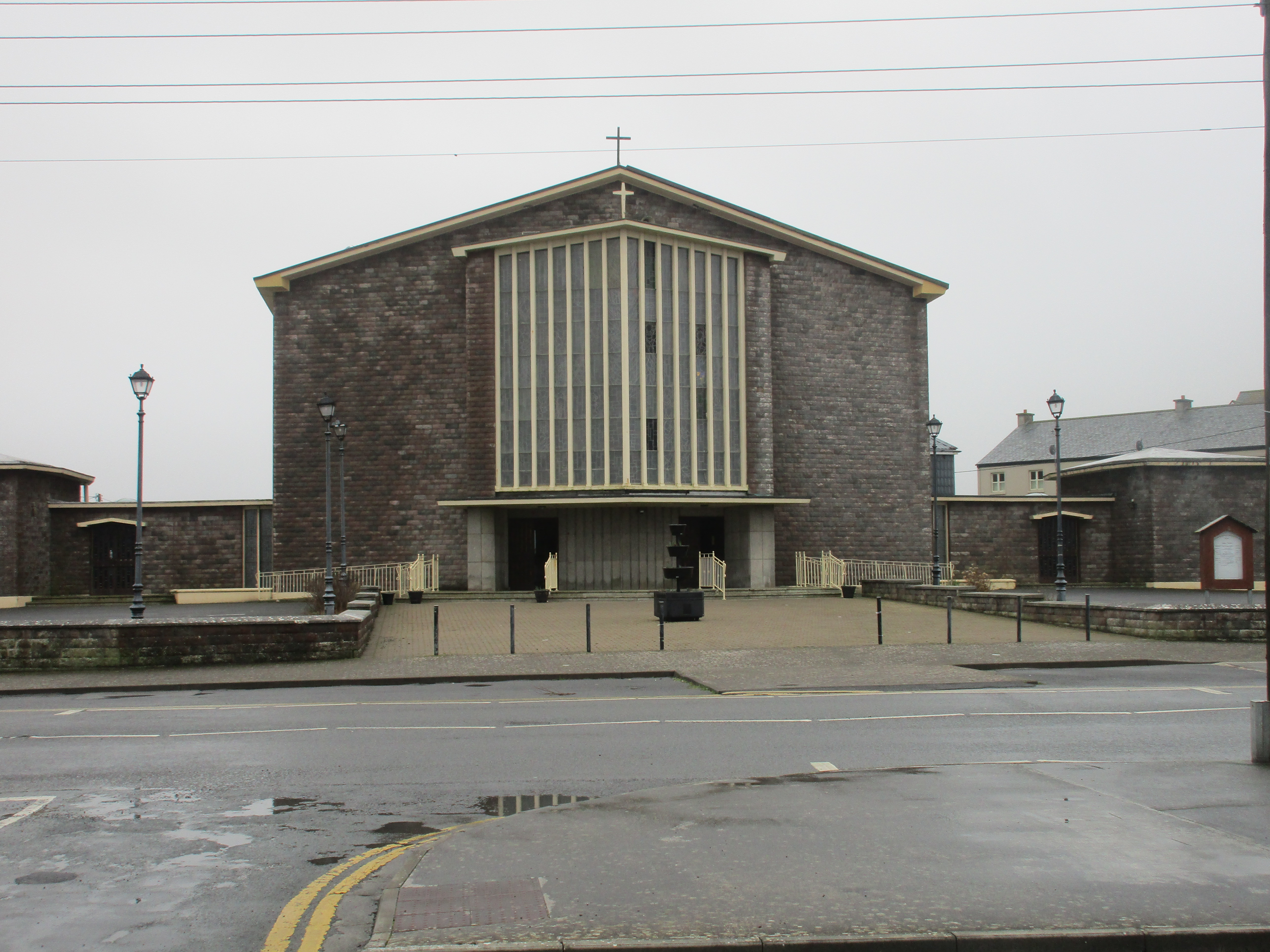
- Kilkee Church

- Location in Ireland
- Coordinates: 52.67888°N 9.646696°W
- Country: Ireland
- Province: Munster
- County: County Clare
- Time zone: UTC+0 (WET)
  - Summer (DST): UTC-1 (IST (WEST))

Kilkee (Irish: Cill Chaoi), formerly Kilfearagh, (Irish: Cill Fhiarach) is a parish in the Roman Catholic Diocese of Killaloe located in County Clare, Ireland. It lies on the Loop Head peninsula between the Atlantic Ocean and the Shannon Estuary. The main settlement is the resort town of Kilkee. The parish contains many ruins, some dating to the early days of Christianity in Ireland.

== Location ==
Kilfearagh is named after a saint called Fiachrach, or Fiachra. There are several saints by that name in the Irish calendars. It is not known which is the patron of the parish.

== History ==
The old parishes of Kilfearagh and Killard of the Roman Catholic Diocese of Killaloe were united by the late seventeenth century. In 1704 Daniel Gorman is recorded as parish priest of Kilfearagh and Killard. Kilfearagh was served by the mass house at Corbally Cross until 1831. That year a parish church was opened in the growing resort of Kilkee. In 1854 the combined parish was redivided into the parishes of Kilkee and Doonbeg, with roughly the same boundaries as the medieval Kilfearagh and Killard.

The first church in Kilkee had a cruciform barn structure, with two octagonal towers framing the entrance. Furnishing and decorating the church was a slow process, and seating in the main aisle was not installed until 1885. After many delays, a new church in Kilkee with a modern design was completed in 1963, and the first church was torn down. Today the Catholic parish is served by the Church of the Immaculate Conception and St. Senan in Kilkee and by St. Flannan’s Church in Lisdeen.

== Antiquities ==
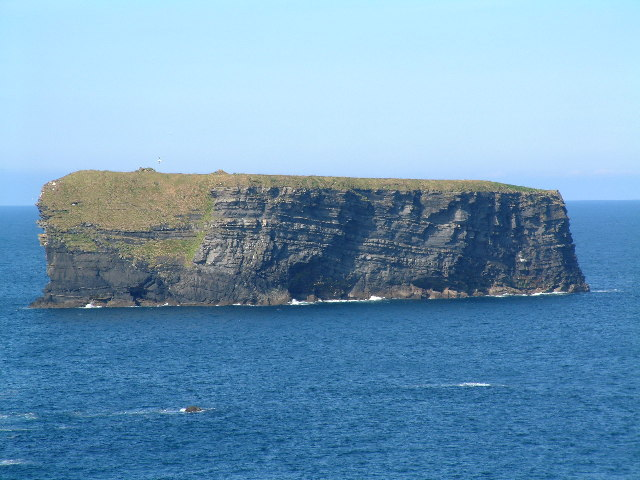
Bishop's Island, Kilferagh, Kilkee

The old church of Kilfearagh has been leveled to the ground, but the large cemetery that surrounds it remains. There is another graveyard in the townland of Kildimo, dedicated to a Saint Dioma, no longer used. A third, named Cill-na-mban-órtha or "church of the pious women", is in the townland of Bawnmore. Near this church there is a holy well with the same name. There was a Church of the Nuns in the townland of Killnagalliagh, founded by Saint Senán, but no traces remain.

There is a small cemetery at Kilkee, which gives the town its name. The town contains a well dedicated to Saint Senán. About 2 miles (3.2 km) from Kilkee, on the edge of the cliff opposite Bishops Island, there is a holy well dedicated to Saint Caoidhe. Bishops Island has two small buildings, an oratory and cell, dating to the early days of Christianity in Ireland. There is a large fort or rath near Kilkee, said to have been built by the Danes.

The parish today has graveyards at Baunmore, Emlagh, Farrihy, Kilfearagh and Kilnagalliagh.

== Gallery ==
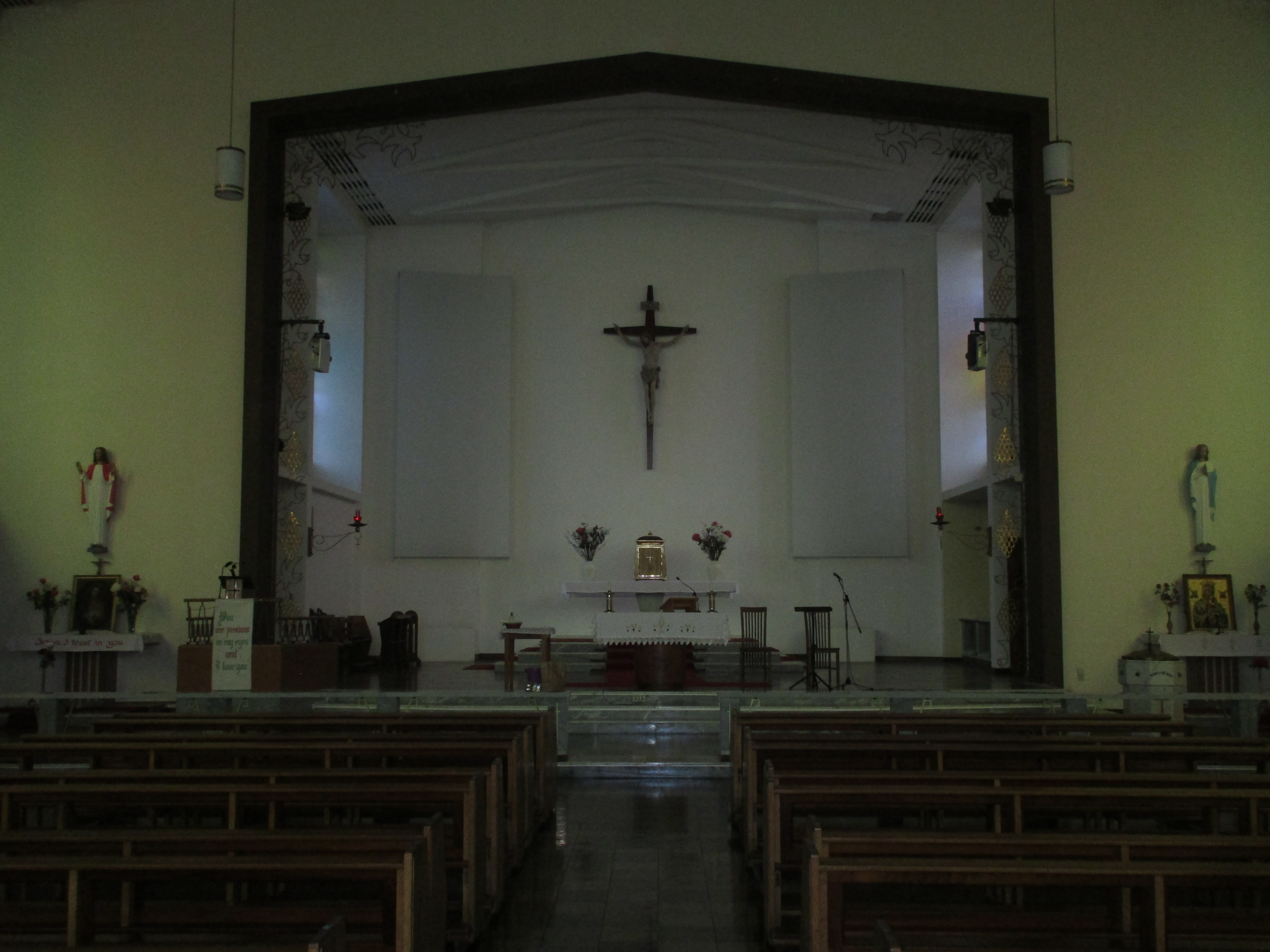
Altar of Kilkee Church

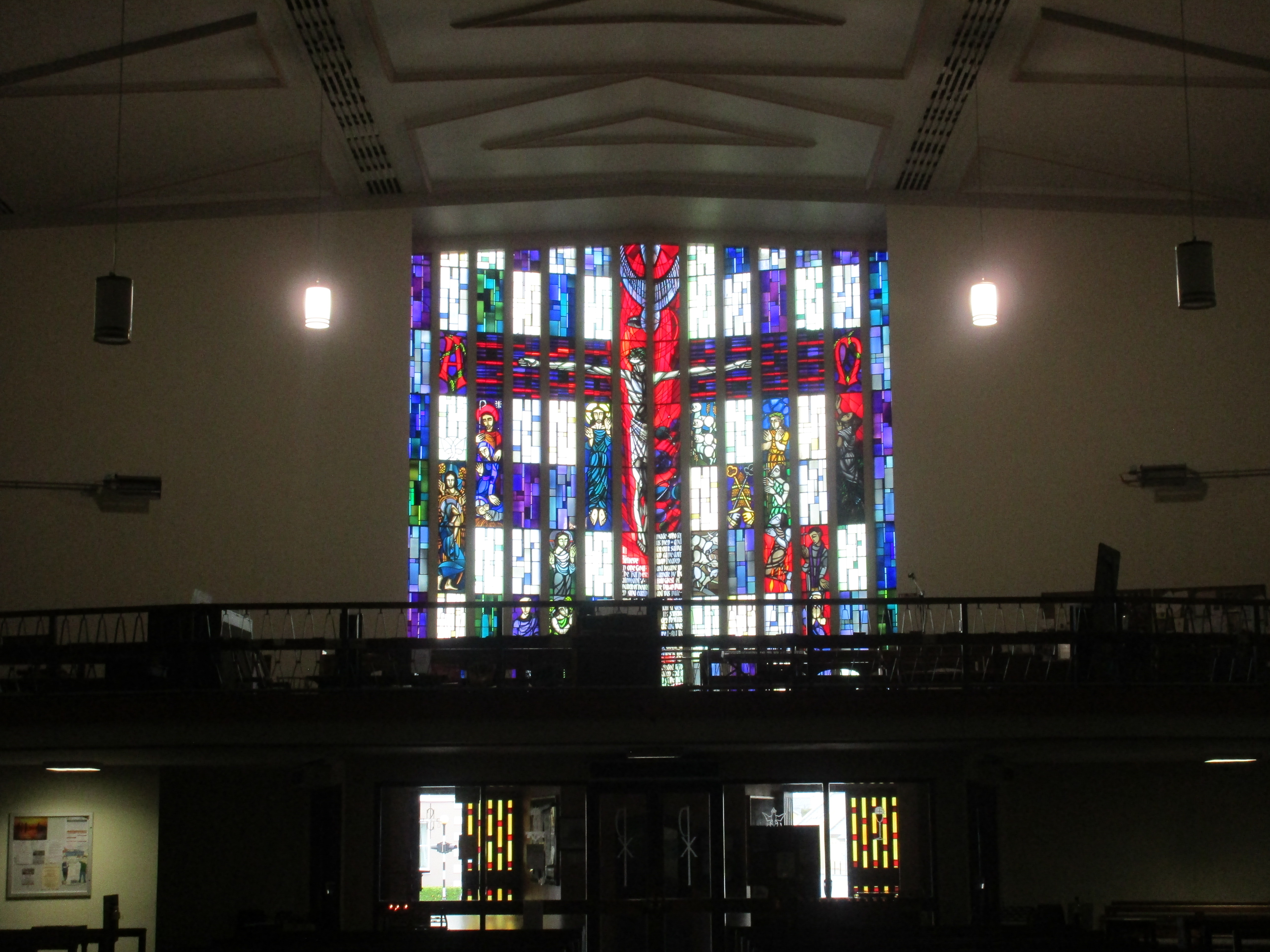
Stain window in Kilkee Church

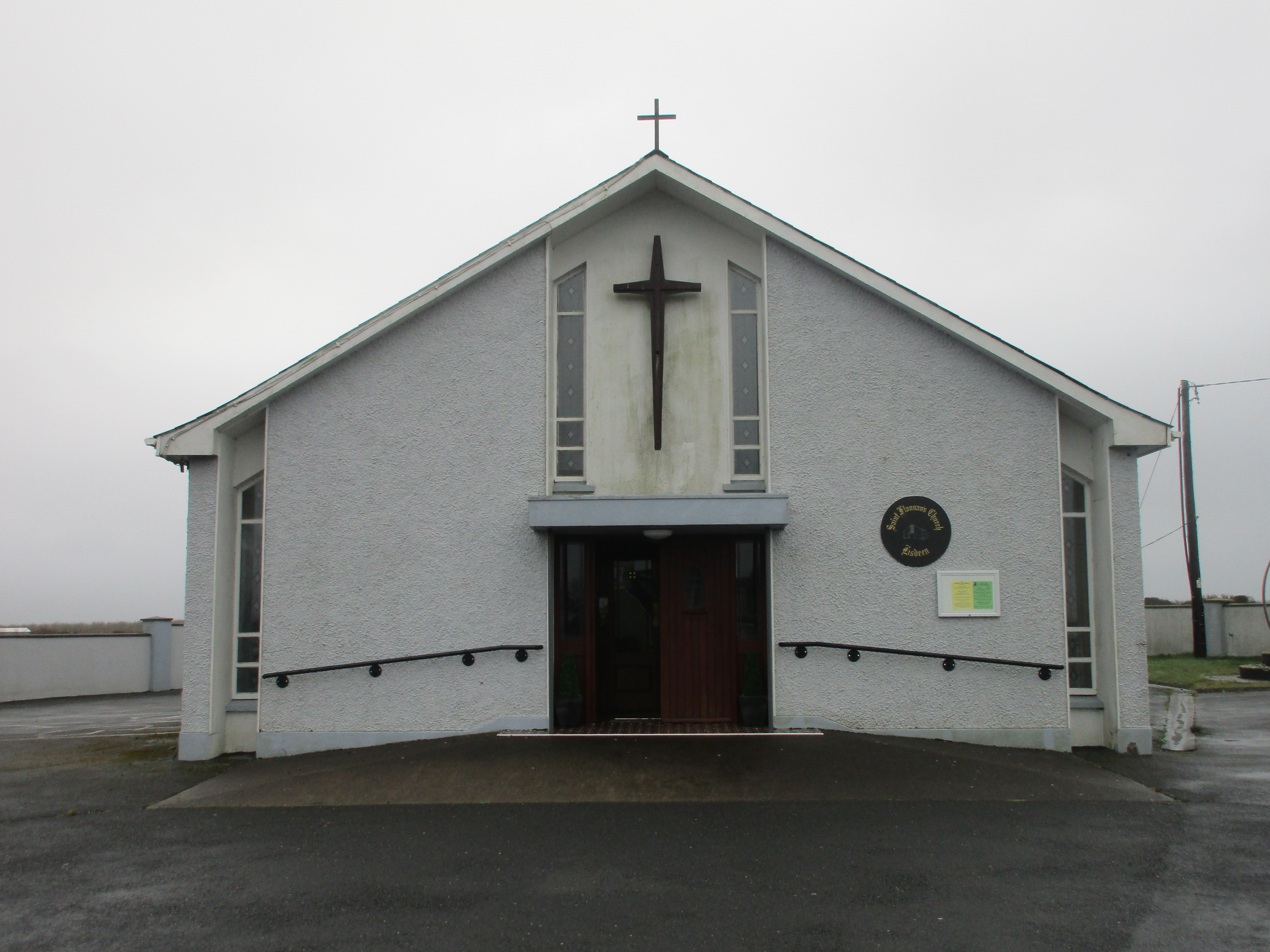
Lisdeen Church

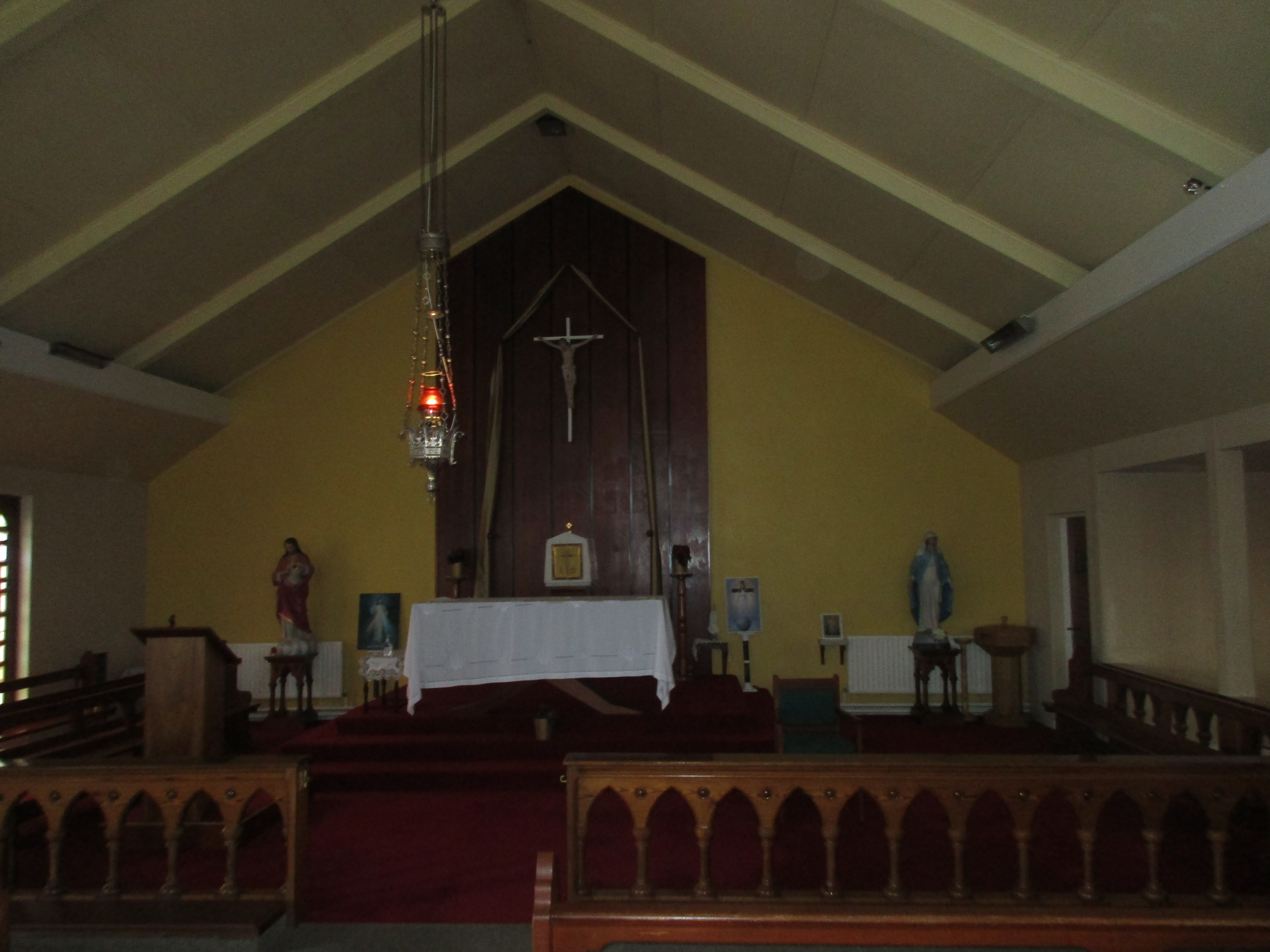
Altar of Lisdeen Church
