= R487 road (Ireland) =

Road in Ireland

Coordinates: 54.865977°N 8.051553°W

R487 road
- Bóthar R487
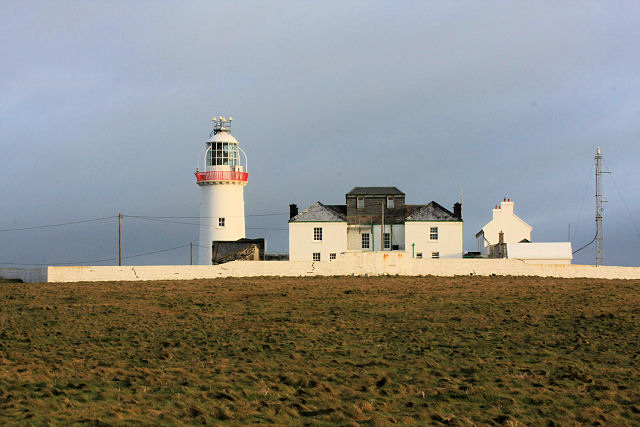
- Loop Head lighthouse, part of R487

Route information
- Length: 27.0 km (16.8 mi)

Major junctions
- From: Loop Head
- R488 Breaghva; R250 Fintown; R253 Aghaveagh
- To: N67 Kilkee

Location
- Country: Ireland

Highway system
- Roads in Ireland; Motorways; Primary; Secondary; Regional

The R487 road is a regional road in Ireland, located in County Clare.
