= Tullig, County Clare =

Village in County Clare, Ireland

Tullig Túllaig
- Village
- Location in Ireland
- Coordinates: 52°36′54″N 9°46′55″W
- Country: Ireland
- Province: Munster
- County: County Clare
- Time zone: UTC+0 (WET)
  - Summer (DST): UTC-1 (IST (WEST))

Tullig (Irish: Túllaig, meaning 'a hill') is a townland and small village located in the Loop Head peninsula in County Clare, Ireland.

It was described in the 1845 Parliamentary Gazetteer as:

A village in the parish of Kilballyowen, barony of Moyarta, County Clare, Munster. It is situated amidst a bleak district of country, about a mile from the nearest part of the coast, 3 miles west-north-west of Carrigaholt, and 6¼ south-west of Kilkee. Area, 8 acres. Pop., in 1841, 269. Houses 50.

The village was virtually destroyed during the Great Famine.
