= Carrigaholt =

Fishing village in County Clare, Ireland

Carrigaholt Carraig an Chabhaltaigh
- Village
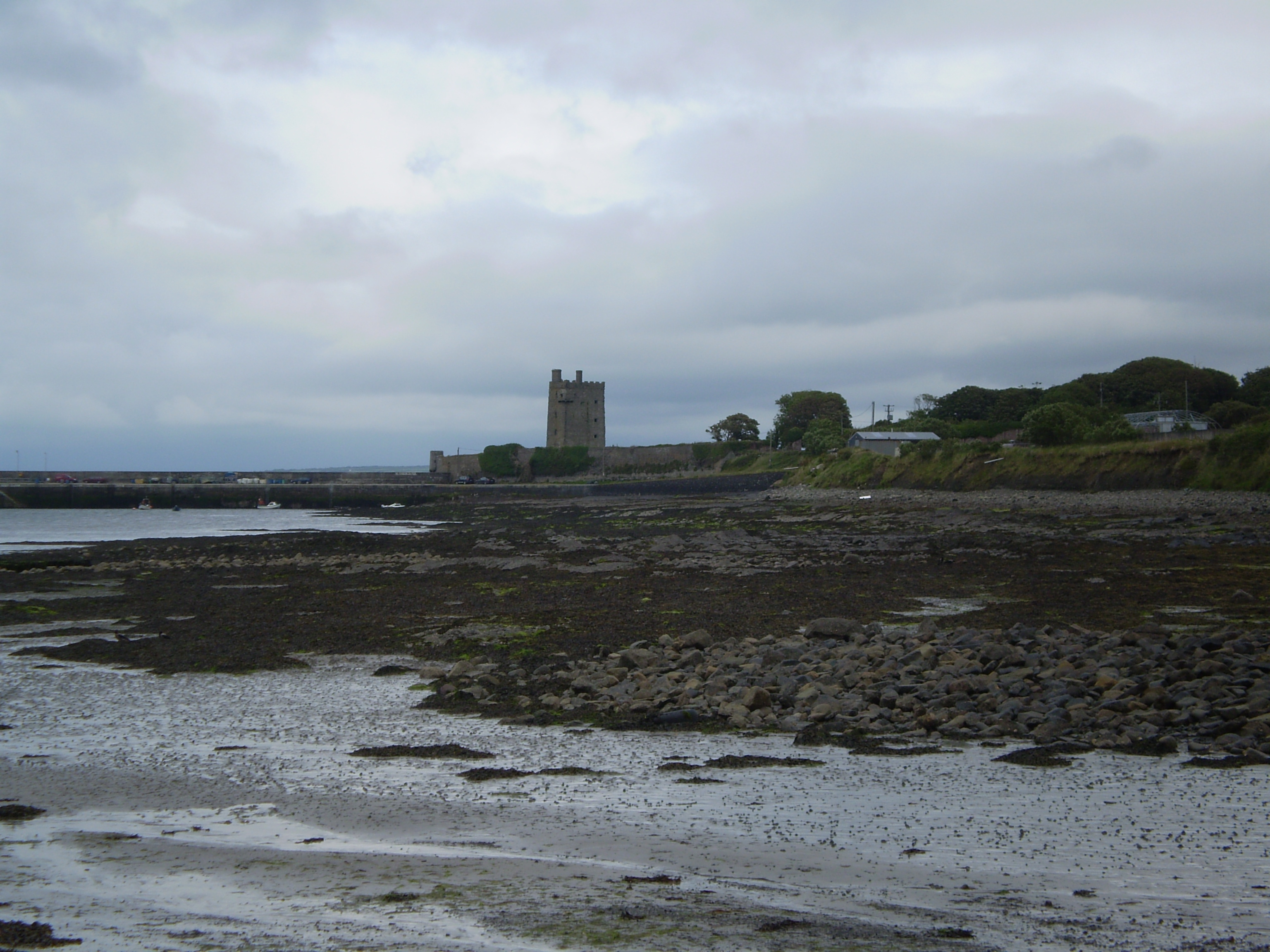
- Carrigaholt Castle as seen from the main town area

- Location in Ireland
- Coordinates: 52°36′N 9°42′W
- Country: Ireland
- Province: Munster
- County: County Clare
- Time zone: UTC+0 (WET)
  - Summer (DST): UTC-1 (IST (WEST))
- Irish Grid Reference: Q841518
- Website: www.kilrush.ie

Carrigaholt (Irish: Carraig an Chabhaltaigh, meaning 'rock of the fleet') is a small fishing village in County Clare, Ireland, a castle and a Catholic parish by the same name. The area was officially classified as part of the West Clare Gaeltacht; an Irish-speaking community; until 1956.

== Location ==
Carrigaholt lies at the mouth of the Moyarta river, which flows into the estuary of the River Shannon about 15 km from the tip of the Loop Head peninsula and about 10 km from the resort town of Kilkee on the north coast of the peninsula. The village boasts a ruined castle that stood guard over the mouth of the Shannon and the local fishing pier.

== Economy ==
Fishing is still continued in the village with a small number of boats delivering their catches to a local processing company. The village is also the local centre for the local farming community. The village has benefited recently from tourism, mainly provided by residents from Limerick some 110 km to the east. The village has two restaurants, a fast food take-away and four public houses, some of which offer live entertainment, particularly during the summer high season. There is a holiday caravan park located nearby.

A local business (Carrigaholt Dolphin Watch) offers boating trips to observe dolphins in the mouth of the Shannon River, home to one of the largest pods in Europe. The Carrigaholt Sea Angling Centre offers fishing packages for up to 8 fishermen at a time and runs a purpose-built boat. Catches include ray, conger, bass, dogfish, tope, cod, pollock, hake and turbot. Other features include a beach suitable for swimming and watersports, two piers, and local village shops for food necessities.

== Facilities ==
Carrigaholt parish, which also covers Doonaha, is part of the Roman Catholic Diocese of Killaloe. The Church of the Blessed Virgin Mary, Carrigaholt, was built in 1832–1833. There is a school in Carrigaholt. Coláiste Eoghain Uí Chomhraídhe, the Irish college one mile west of Carrigaholt was founded in 1912. Students come from various locations in Ireland to learn and improve their Irish each Summer.

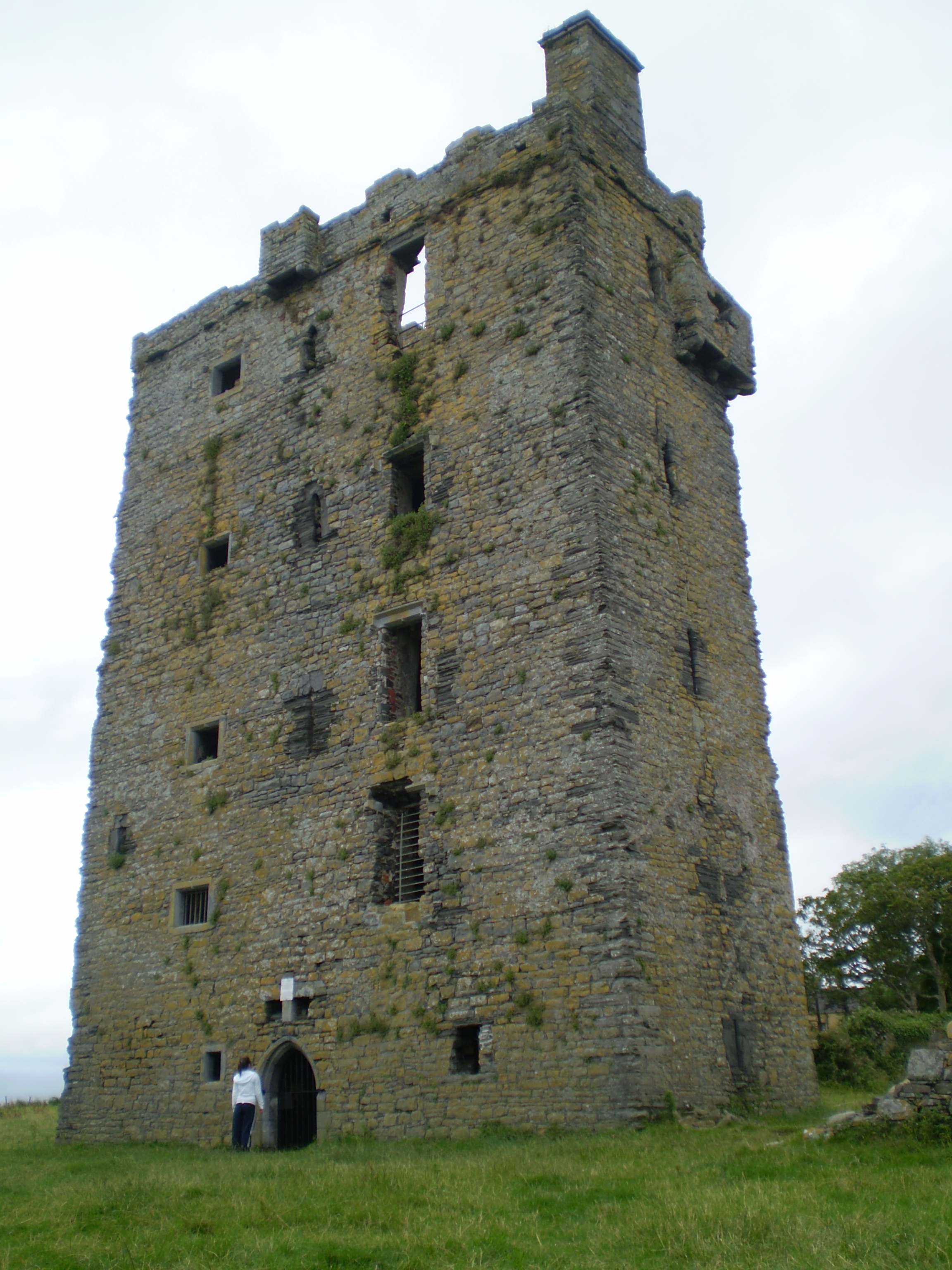
Carrigaholt Castle viewed from within the grounds.

== Carrigaholt Castle ==
Carrigaholt Castle was built in about 1480 by the McMahons, chiefs of the Corcabascin Peninsula. It stands at the end of a fishing pier overlooking the Shannon Estuary and the harbour. This is a tall, well-preserved five storey tower house surrounded by a bawn (walled courtyard). The castle features murder holes and a bartizan. A spiral staircase leads to the top of the building where there was a stone vaulted roof.

The castle was occupied by Teige Caech "the short sighted" McMahon in September 1588 when seven ships of the Spanish Armada anchored at Carrigaholt. Although aid was refused by the McMahons (who are descendants of Mathgamain mac Cennétig), the castle was nonetheless unsuccessfully besieged shortly afterwards by Sir Conyers Clifford (Governor of Connaught). The following year the renegade fourth Earl of Thomond (Donagh O'Brien) captured it after a four-day siege and, in breach of the surrender terms, hanged all the defenders.

Ownership then passed to the Earl's brother Donal O'Brien, who was responsible for inserting many of the castle's windows as well as the fireplace on the fifth floor, which bears the date 1603. Donal's grandson was the celebrated third Viscount Clare who resided at Carrigaholt and raised a regiment of horses known as the "Yellow Dragoons" for the House of Stuart King James II of England's armies. After the forfeiture of his extensive 230 km^{2} (57,000-acre) estate by the Williamites, the castle was acquired by the Burton family.

The castle today is under the care of the Office of Public Works. All that remains is a shell of its former nobility. The Burton Family were the last inhabitants and left it in the late 19th century.

== Gallery ==
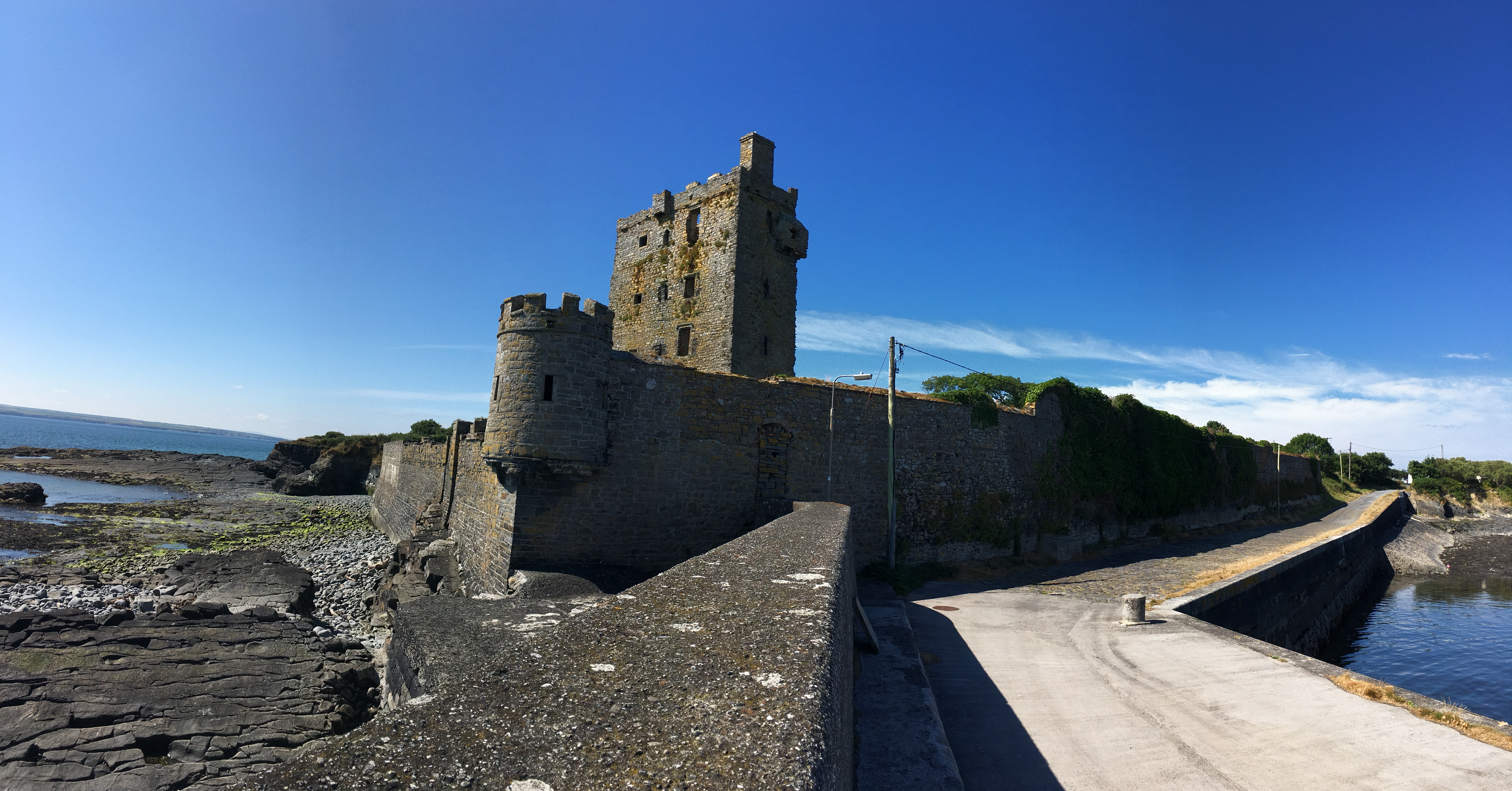
Carrigaholt Castle and enclosing bawn wall. Round tower to the foreground.

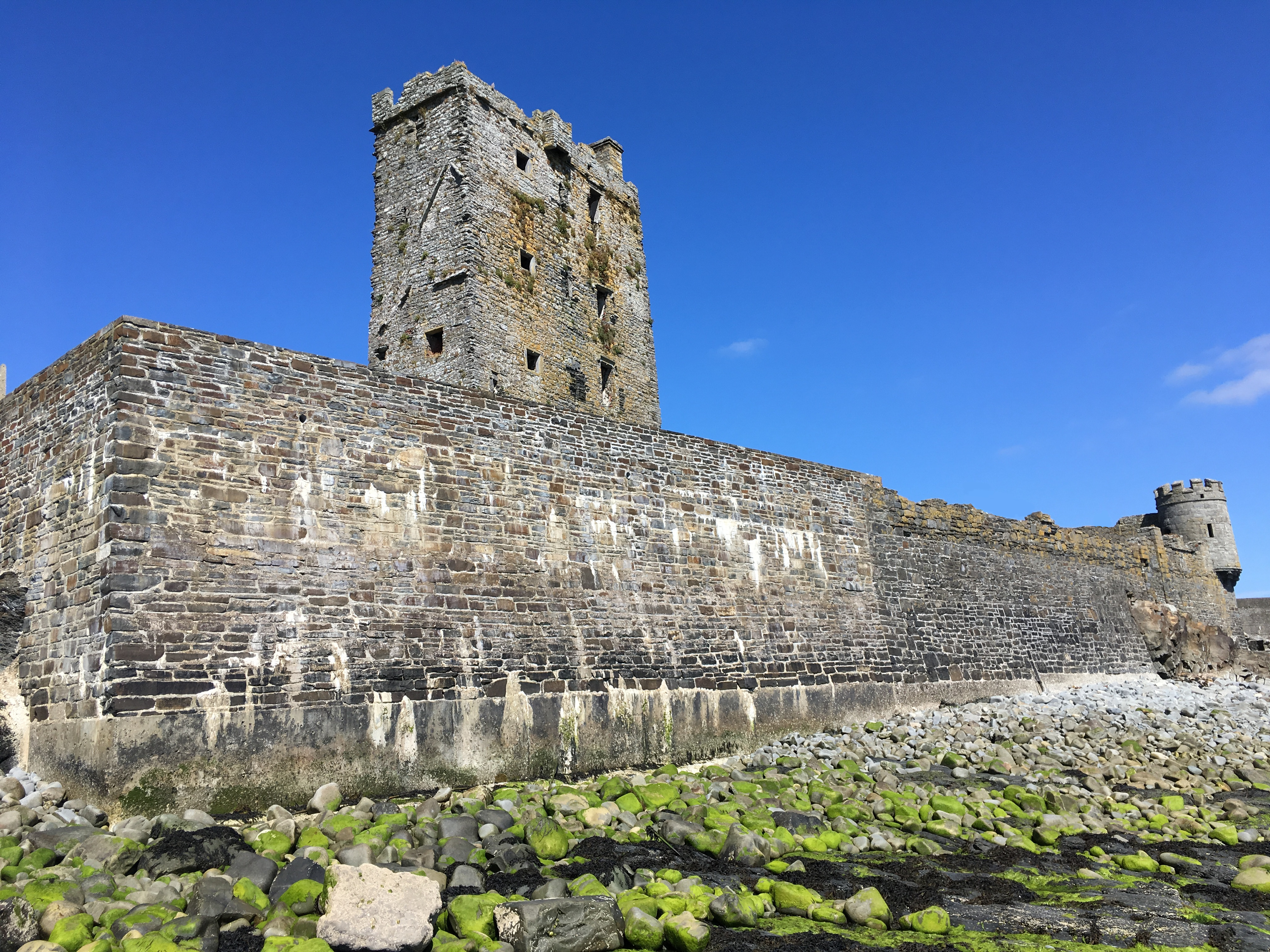
Carrigaholt Castle from the sea side

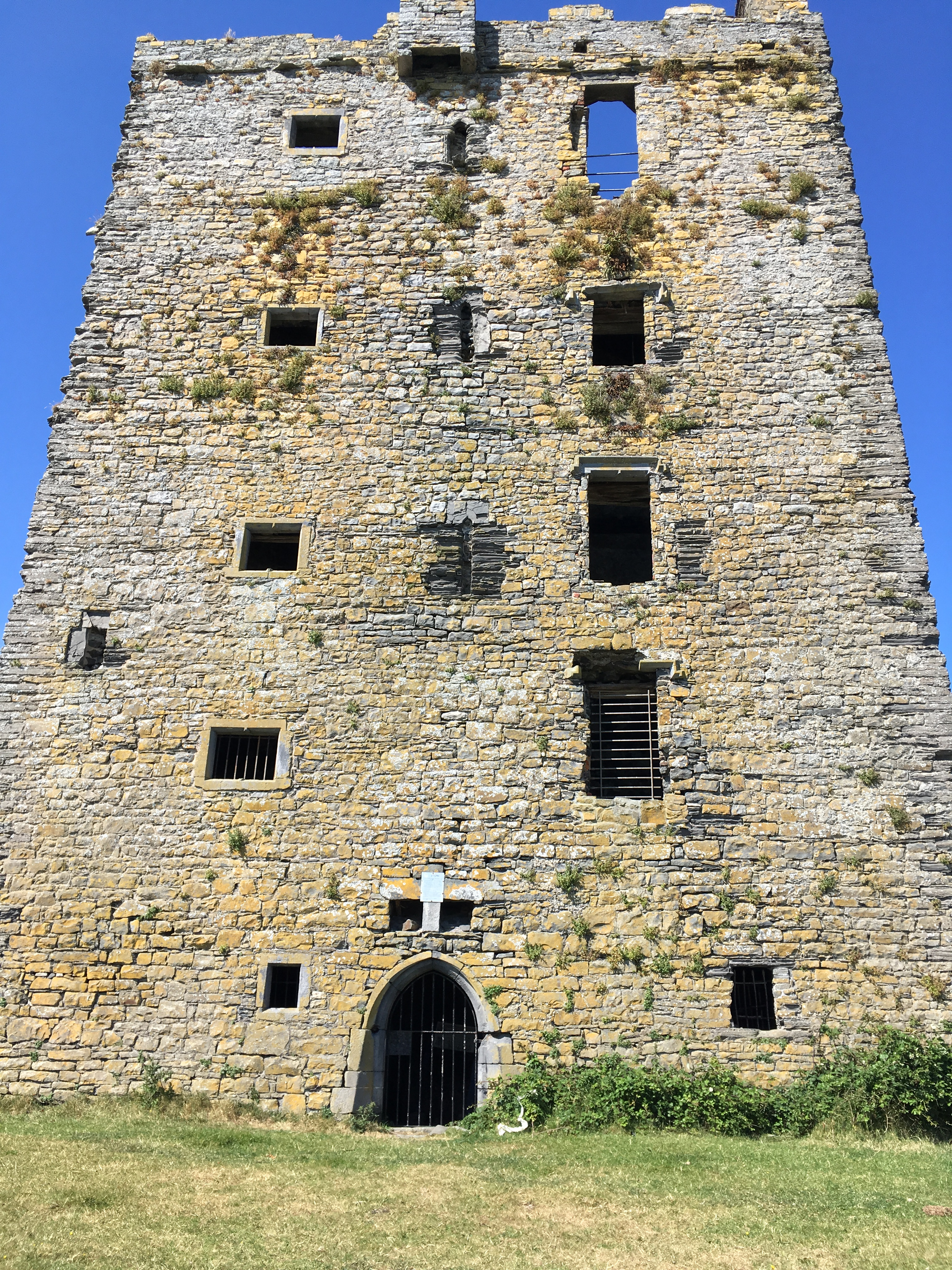
Carrigaholt Castle

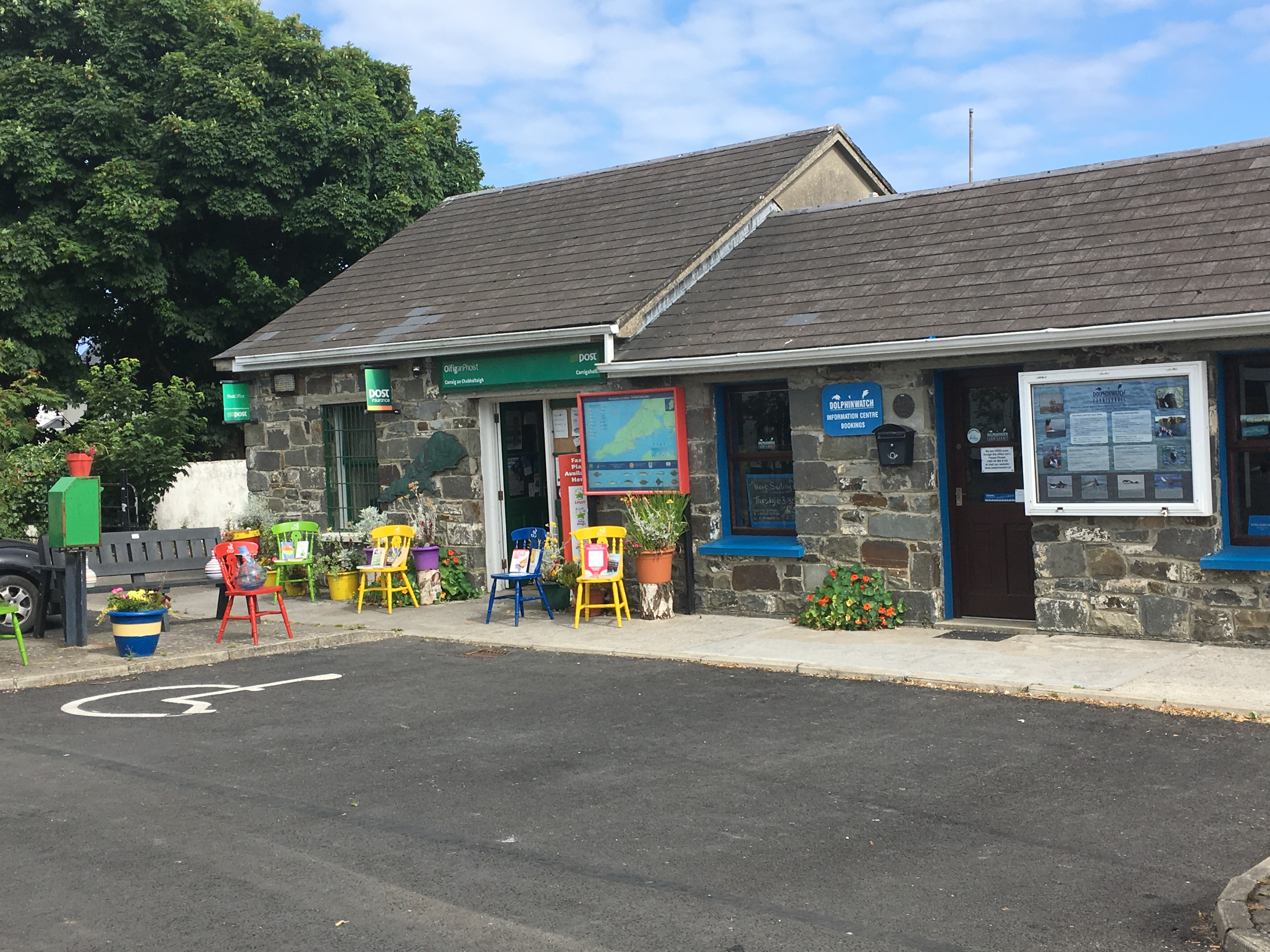
Carrigaholt Post Office

== See also ==
- List of towns and villages in Ireland
