= European Destinations of Excellence =

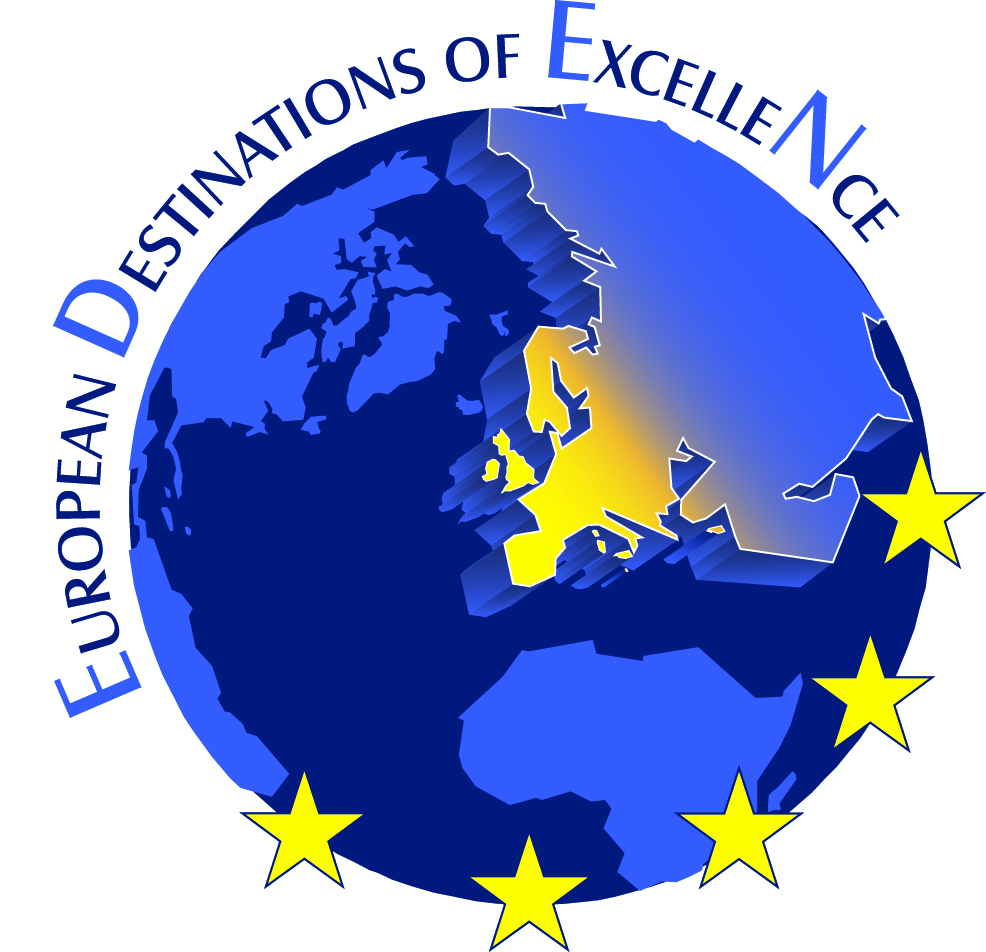
Logo EDEN

European Destinations of ExcelleNce, also known by the acronym EDEN, is an initiative launched by the European Commission promoting sustainable tourism development models across Europe. The project is based on national competitions which take place every year since 2006 and results in the selection of a “destination of excellence” for each participating country. The winners are emerging, lesser known destinations located in the 27 EU Member States, the Candidate Countries and the EFTA/EEA countries.

== The objectives of EDEN ==
Tourism is a strategic economic activity in the European Union, whose importance is likely to continue to increase in the coming years. It has a great potential as regards contributing to the achievement of several major EU objectives, such as sustainable development, economic growth, employment as well as economic and social cohesion. For achieving these goals the European Commission has launched the EDEN project.

== Selection process of the EDEN destinations ==
Every year, the European Commission publishes one call for proposals to offer its support to the national public administrations in charge of tourism in the Member States (as a rule the National Ministries or other public bodies having the same tasks) to take part in the project and organize a national selection procedure. Candidate Countries and EFTA/EEA are admitted as well and will benefit from the same promotional activities as all the EU Member States. Each participating country manages its own selection process during the first half of the year, organising a communication campaign to inform all possible candidates about the competition. Destinations taking part have to show that economically viable tourism has been developed based on each year's EDEN theme. The winning destinations are those that best reflect the yearly theme and that offer a unique tourism experience, in line with sustainable patterns. In the middle of the year, a winning destination per country is selected on the basis of a set of award criteria established at both European and national level. The names of the winners are then communicated to the European Commission, who is in charge of organising a European Award Ceremony.

== The EDEN editions ==
Each EDEN edition is developed around an annual theme, chosen by the Commission together with the relevant national tourism bodies. This theme functions as a leitmotif: so far, rural tourism (2007), local intangible heritage (2008), protected areas (2009), aquatic tourism (2010) and regeneration of physical sites (2011) have been the main EDEN themes.

Each of the chosen theme serves to highlight different aspects of European regions’ assets and is related to sustainable development in one way or another, whether from a cultural, economic, local involvement or environmental point of view. EDEN topics provide an opportunity for demonstrating the wealth of diversity Europe can offer, including its natural resources, historical heritage, traditional celebrations, local gastronomy, and so on.

== EDEN 2012 ==
In May 2011 a call for proposals was launched by the European Commission to support National Administrations in charge of tourism for the purpose of promoting the EDEN destinations awarded in 2007-2011 and for enhancing awareness of the EDEN rationale in trans-national partnerships. 18 countries participate in the project from November 2011 until August 2012: Austria, Belgium, Bulgaria, Cyprus, Czech Republic, Estonia, Spain, France, Croatia, Hungary, Ireland, Italy, Lithuania, Latvia, Malta, Poland, Slovenia and Turkey.
