= Shannon Estuary =

Estuary in Ireland, flowing into the Atlantic

Coordinates: 52°35′N 9°18′W

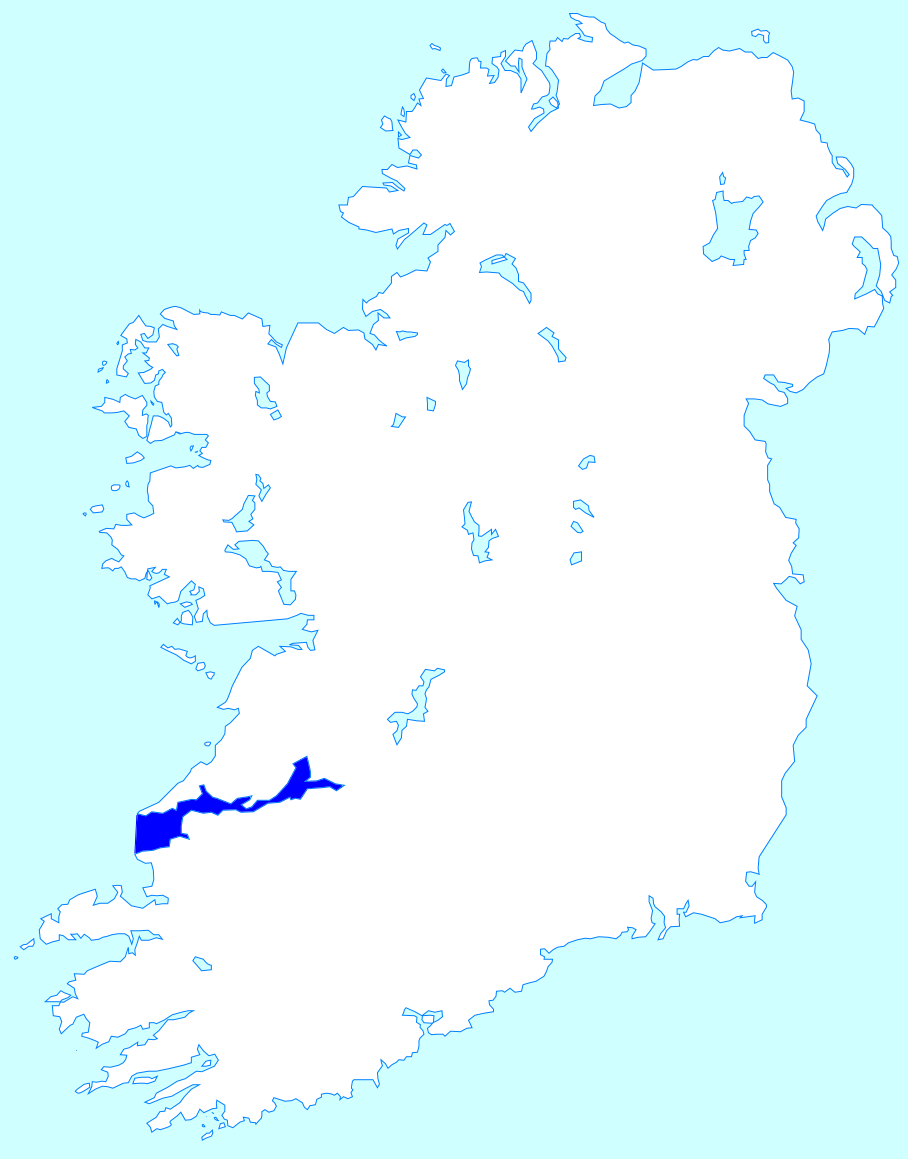
- Shannon Estuary (Blue)
- Native name: Inbhear na Sionainne (Irish)

Location
- Country: Ireland
- Counties: Clare, Limerick, Kerry

Physical characteristics
- Mouth: Loop Head / Kerry Head
- Length: 102.1 km (63.4 mi)

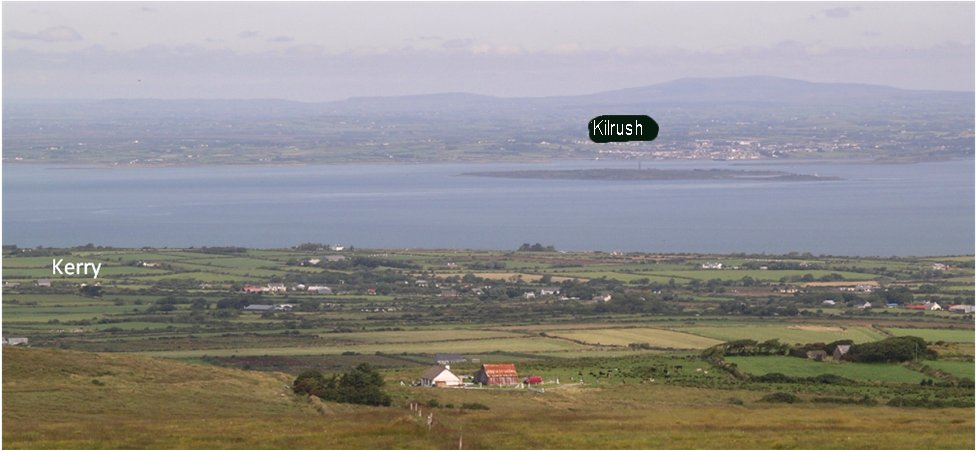
Kilrush as seen across the estuary from County Kerry

The Shannon Estuary in Ireland (Irish: Inbhear na Sionainne) is a large estuary where the River Shannon flows into the Atlantic Ocean. The estuary has Limerick City at its head and its seaward limits are marked by Loop Head to the north and Kerry Head to the south. The estuary defines the main boundary between County Kerry/County Limerick to the south and County Clare to the north.

The length of the Shannon Estuary is 102.1 km (63.4 mi). The Lower River Shannon Special Area of Conservation (SAC) incorporates the estuary and is 120 km (75 mi) in length, running from Killaloe to Loop Head. The Shannon has a high tidal range, up to around 5.44 m (17.8 ft) at Limerick docks, such that the estuary has been considered for tidal power schemes, despite occasionally experiencing a tidal bore.

In the second half of the 19th century about 65 km² of the estuary's lowlands have been embanked and reclaimed, largely for agricultural purposes.

== Aircraft ==
In the late 1930s, transatlantic air traffic was dominated by flying boats, and a flying boat terminal was located at Foynes on the south side of the Shannon Estuary. However, it was realised that developing technology would require a permanent runway and airport.

In 1936, the government of Ireland confirmed that it would develop a 3.1 km^{2} (1.2 sq mi) site at Rineanna for the country's first transatlantic airport. The land on which the airport was to be built was bog, and on 8 October 1936 work began to drain the land. By 1942 a serviceable airport had been established and was named Shannon Airport. From then, passengers were moved from the flying boats in Foynes to the land planes based at Shannon Airport. By 1945 the existing runways at Shannon were extended to allow transatlantic flights to land, completely bypassing the need for Foynes.

== Port ==
Shannon Foynes Port Company is the port authority for the entire estuary. It owns facilities at Foynes Dock, Limerick City and at airport jetty. It provides marine services, including pilotage and towage to privately owned facilities at Moneypoint, Tarbert Island and Aughinish. The maritime history of the estuary is catalogued and on display in exhibits at the Maritime Section of the Foynes Flying Boat Museum.

== Sustainable exploitation ==
The Shannon Estuary is an immensely important asset and one of the most valuable natural resources in Ireland and the Mid-West Region in particular – the fringe lands and the marine area both provide space and location for development activities and opportunities to progress economic, social, and environmental growth within the Region. Some initiatives, such as the Strategic Integrated Framework Plan (SIFP) for the Shannon Estuary 2013-2020, aim to provide an inter-jurisdictional land and marine-based framework plan to guide the future development and management of the Shannon Estuary. It was commissioned in 2011 by Clare County Council, Kerry County Council, Limerick City and County Councils, Shannon Development, and the Shannon Foynes Port Company. The project is being overseen by a multi-agency steering group composed of the above and other key stakeholders with an interest in the Estuary.

Calculations of tidal power show that 111-367 GWh/year could be extracted from the estuary, compared to 2.6 TWh/year for the island.

== Biology ==
Zoology: Bottlenose dolphins (Tursiops truncatus) are seen in the estuary.

== Fishing ==
An eel trap and transport scheme is in force on the River Shannon as part of a management programme instigated following the discovery of diminishing eel numbers on the River Shannon. The scheme ensures safe passage for young eels between Killaloe Bridge and the Shannon estuary.

Though the Shannon estuary the fishing industry is now depleted, though at one time it provided employment for hundreds of men along its length. At Limerick, fishermen based on Clancy's Strand used the gandelow to catch salmon. In the 1920s the construction of a dam at Ardnacrusha severely impacted salmon breeding and that, and the introduction of quotas, had by the 1950s caused salmon fishing to cease. However, recreational fishing still goes on. Further down the estuary at Kilrush the currach was used to catch herring as well as drift nets for salmon.

== See also ==
- Deer Island (Ireland)
- River Fergus
- Wild Atlantic Way
