= Loop Head =

Headland in County Clare, Ireland

Loop Head Lighthouse
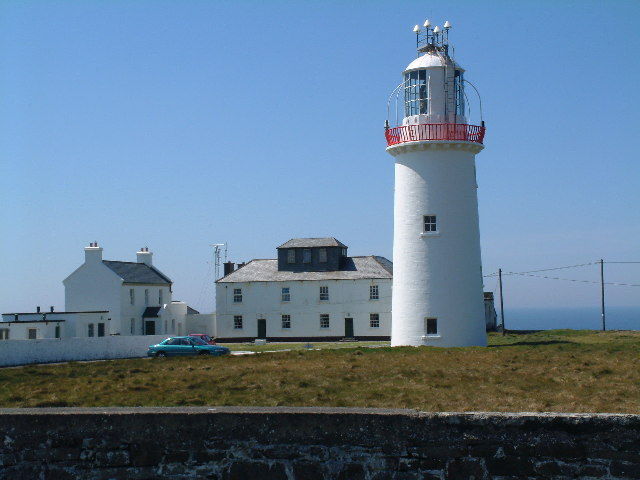
- Loop Head Lighthouse operated by the Commissioners of Irish Lights
- Location: Loop Head
- Coordinates: 52°33′39.5″N 9°55′54.3″W

Tower
- Constructed: 1854
- Construction: Masonry tower
- Automated: 1991
- Height: 23 metres (75 ft)
- Shape: Cylindrical tower with balcony and lantern
- Markings: White tower, red balcony rail

Light
- Focal height: 84 metres (276 ft)
- Lens: 1st order Fresnel lens
- Range: 23 nautical miles (43 km; 26 mi)
- Characteristic: Fl (4) W 20s
- Ireland no.: CIL-2130

Loop Head (Irish: Ceann Léime, meaning 'leap head'), is a headland on the north side of the mouth of the River Shannon, in County Clare in the west of Ireland.

Loop Head is marked by a prominent lighthouse. The opposite headland on the south side of the Shannon is Kerry Head. The Shannon Foynes Port Company controls navigation in the Shannon estuary and river.

Loop Head peninsula, has the Atlantic Ocean on one side and the Shannon Estuary on the other, with barely a mile of land saving it from island status.

In 2010, the Loop Head peninsula was awarded a European Destinations of Excellence Award, which is an EU accolade for emerging tourism destinations which are developing in a responsible and sustainable manner. In 2013, Loop Head was named the "Best Place to Holiday in Ireland" by The Irish Times, and was shortlisted in the Best Destination category at the World Responsible Tourism awards. The Loop Head Peninsula is the only Irish destination listed in the 2014 Global Sustainable Top 100 Destinations and in 2015 took the gold medal at the Irish Responsible Tourism Awards.

Part of the film Star Wars: The Last Jedi was filmed at Loop Head.

The head has a giant "Eire" sign left over from World War II during The Emergency in Ireland.

== Gallery ==
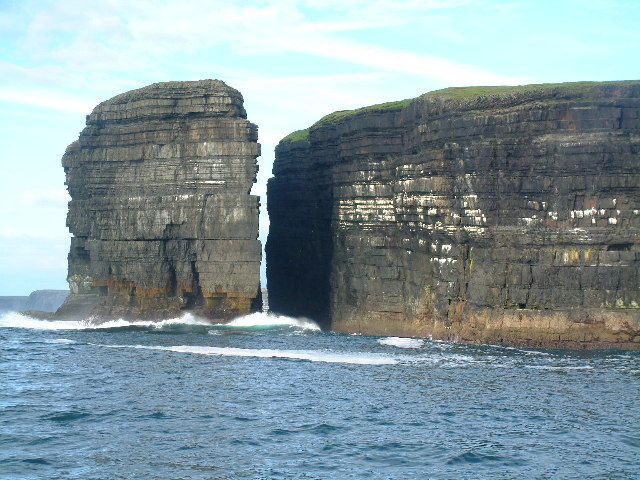
Diarmuid and Gráinne's Rock or Lover's Leap

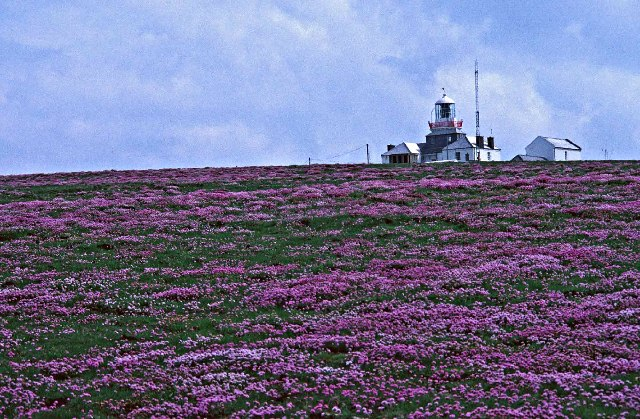
Lighthouse

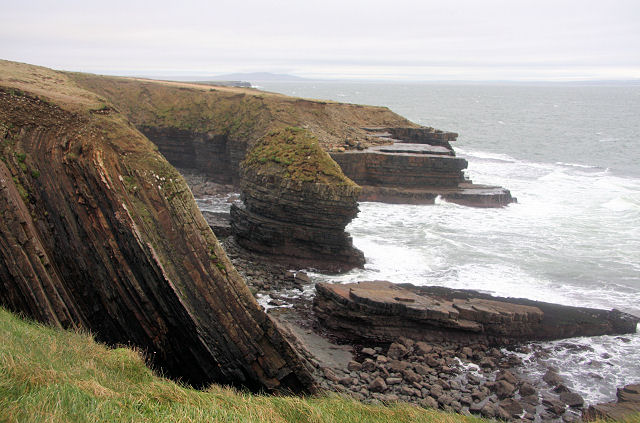
Aillnagreagh

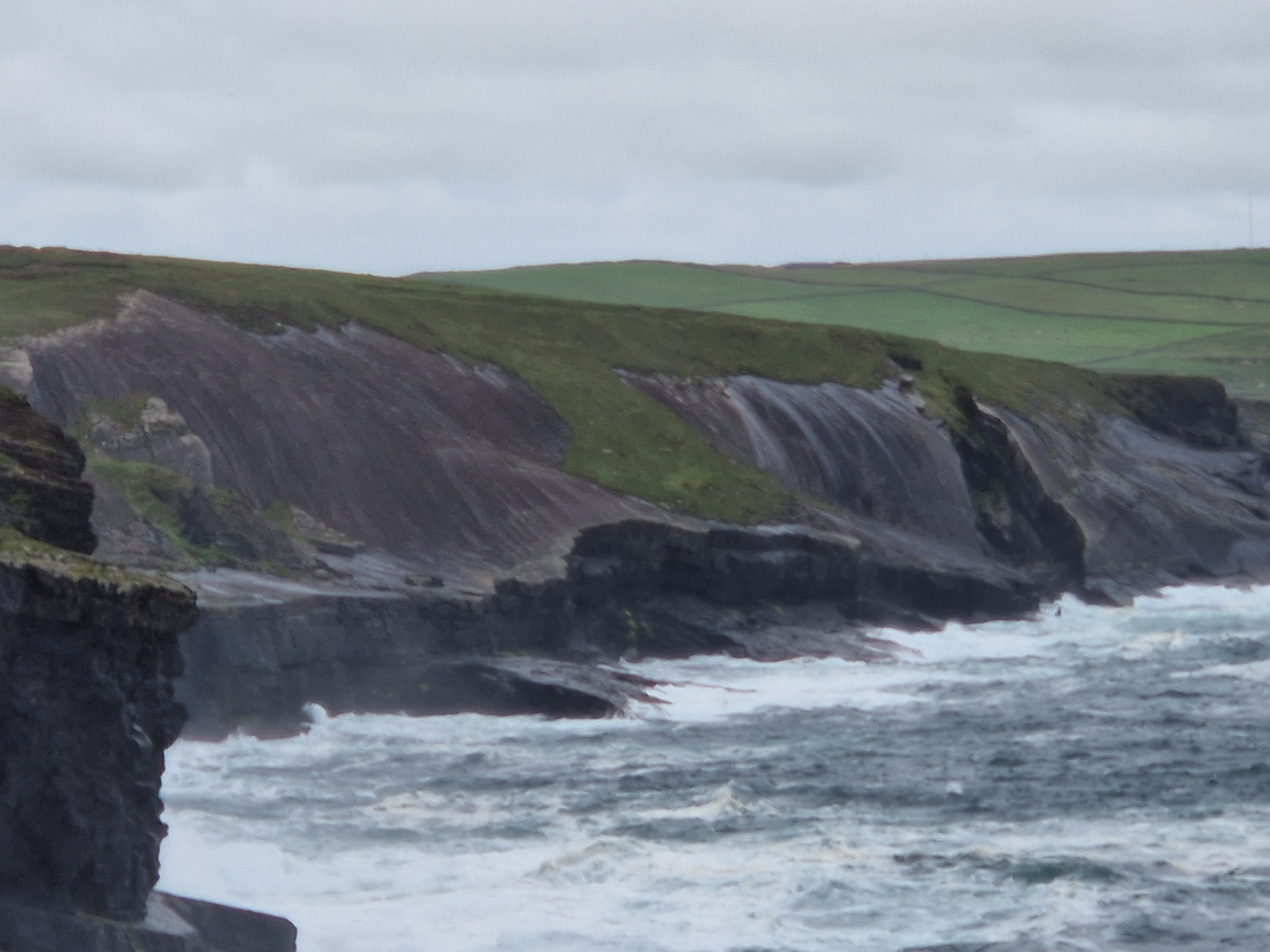
Kilkee Cliffs

== See also ==
- List of lighthouses in Ireland
