= Islands (barony) =

Islands Na hOileáin
- Location within Ireland
- Coordinates: 52.728496°N 9.059128°W
- Country: Ireland
- Province: Munster
- County: Clare

Area
  - Total: 257.34 km^{2} (99.36 sq mi)

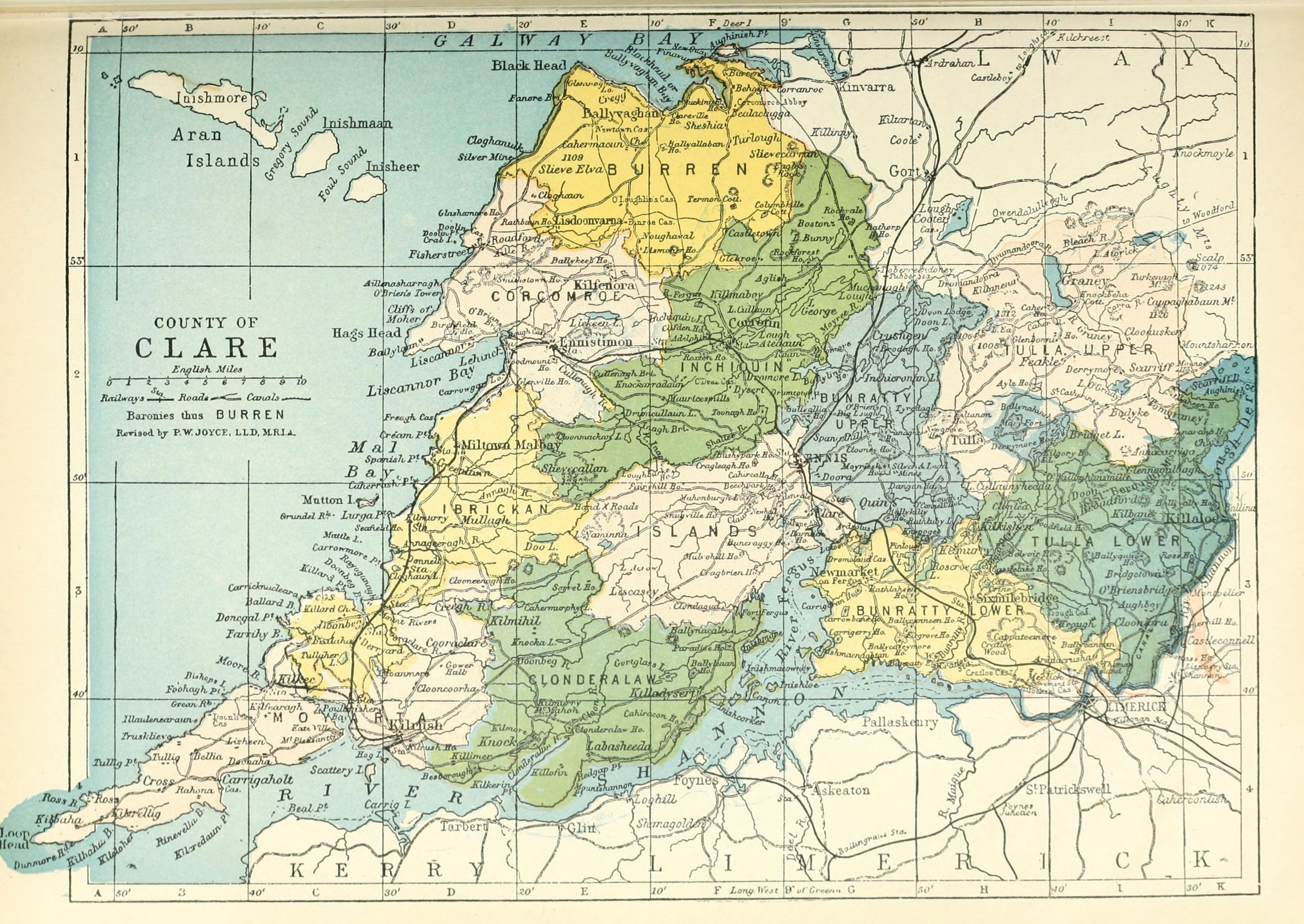
Baronies of Clare. Barony of Islands is in the south centre.

Islands (Irish: Na hOileáin) is a barony located in County Clare, Ireland. This ancient unit of land division is in turn divided into five civil parishes.

== Etymology ==
The name refers to the many islands of the Fergus estuary, such as Canon Island, Deer Island, Inishloe, Feenish and Trummer: the Anglo-Normans approaching from Limerick along these waters perceived the County Clare region as an archipelago and named it "the cantred of the isles of Thomond", a name still preserved in that of the barony.

== Legal context ==
Baronies were created after the Norman invasion of Ireland as divisions of counties and were used the administration of justice and the raising of revenue. While baronies continue to be officially defined units, they have been administratively obsolete since 1898. However, they continue to be used in land registration and in specification, such as in planning permissions. In many cases, a barony corresponds to an earlier Gaelic túath which had submitted to the Crown.

== Location ==
The barony is bounded by the barony of Inchiquin (to the north), by Bunratty Upper (to the east), by Clonderalaw (to the south) and by Ibrickane (to the west). It covers 67,101 acres (27,155 ha) of which 3,471 acres (1,405 ha) are tideway of the River Fergus and 3,932 acres (1,591 ha) are water. The river and estuary of the Fergus form the eastern boundary of the barony, which slopes down to the water. The western part is mainly peaty uplands, while the east includes some of the rich pasturage known as "Corcasses".

== Parishes and settlements ==
The barony contains the civil parishes of Clare-Abbey, Clondagad, Dromcliffe, Killone, and Kilmaly. The main settlements are Ennis and Clare.
