= List of rivers of County Clare =

List of rivers in County Clare is an overview of the named rivers and stream flowing (wholly or partly) through County Clare, Ireland.

95% of County Clare is located within the Shannon River Basin with the remainder in the so-called "Western River Basin District".

== Main watercourses ==
- Shannon
  - River Fergus, Shannon tributary, rises north-west of Corofin
    - Fergus Minor River, branch flowing at the northern side of Ennis.

== Navigable rivers within the Shannon-Fergus system ==
Commercial traffic has largely ceased, but there is sometimes leisure traffic.

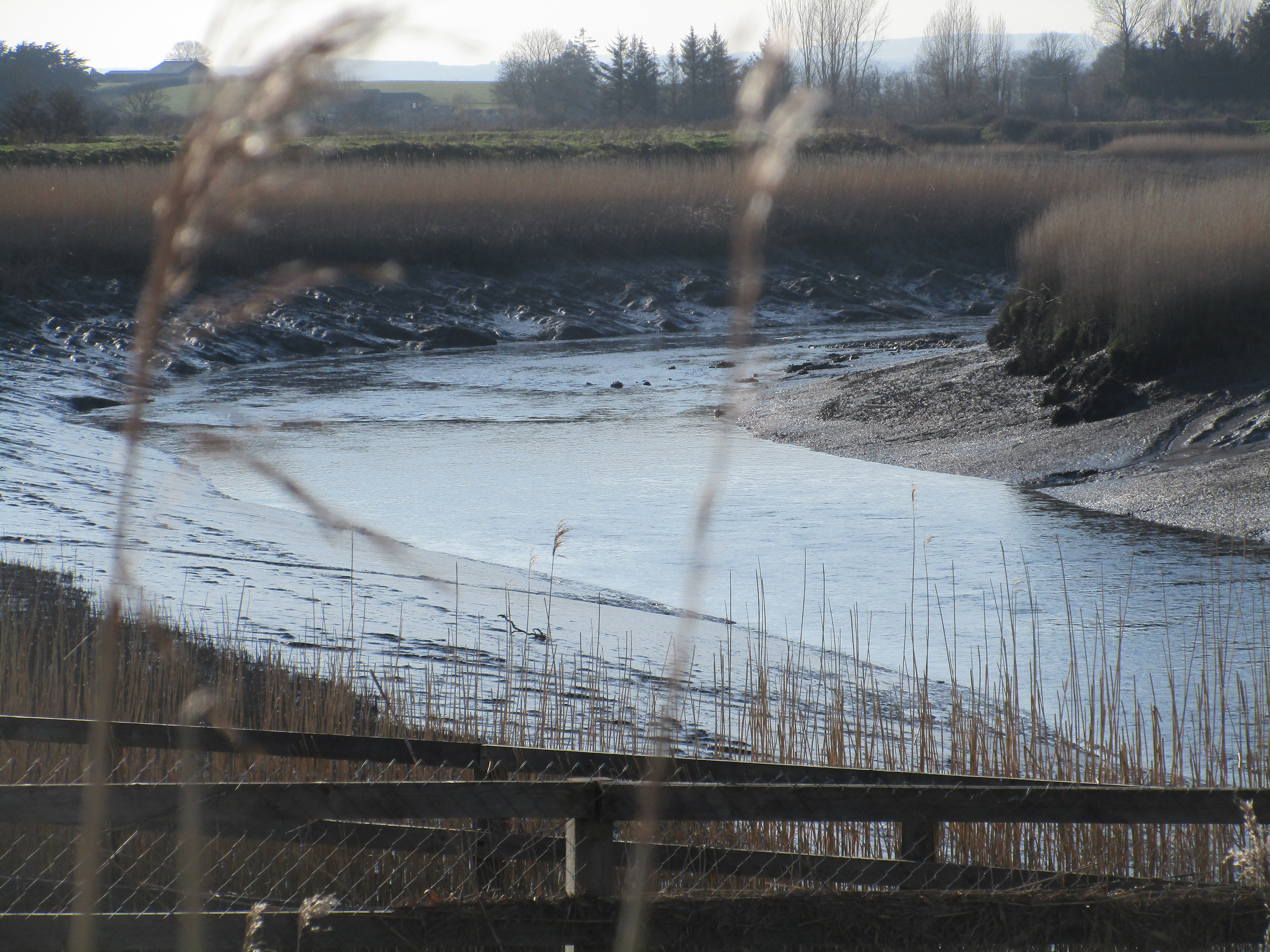
The Rhine is a tidal river

- Moyasta River, Moyasta Bog to Poulnasherry Bay
- Ratty River, also named Owengarney River or O'Garney River, Shannon tributary, connecting Sixmilebridge. River trade was largely destroyed by the building of the "D’Esterre’s Bridge" with tollhouses in 1784, which was too low for bigger ships and the narrow channel made navigation for smaller ship too dangerous.
- Rhine, also named Latoon Creek or Ardsollus River, a tributary of the Fergus, connecting Quin
- Scariff River, a Shannon tributary, from Lough O'Grady to Lough Derg.

== Other rivers part of the Shannon-Fergus system ==
- Anamullaghaun River, Graney tributary
- Ardcloony River, Shannon tributary.
- Ath Leathan River, Shannon tributary, near Kilbane.
- Ayle River, Graney tributary
- Ballybeg Stream
- Ballyfinneen Stream
- Ballygriffey River, Fergus tributary
- Ballynacally River, Shannon tributary, flows into Ballynacally Creek. Near Ballynacally.
- River Blackwater, Shannon tributary
- Broadford River, Glenomra tributary
- Caher River, Scariff tributary
- Clareabbey Stream, next to Clare Abbey. Fergus tributary.
- Claureen River, also named Inch River, Fergus tributary, Inch to Ennis
- Cloghaun River, Graney tributary
- Crompaun River, Shannon tributary. East of Kilmurry McMahon.
- Cromptaun River, Meelick. Shannon Tributary.
- Cloon River, Shannon tributary. South of Lisscasey, through Cranny.
- Cloverhill Stream
- Derrymore River, Shannon Tributary, near Kilkishen.
- Doonaha River, Doonaha Bog to Shannon, south of Doonaha
- St. Flannan's Stream, Ennis, Fergus tributary
- Gaurus River
- Glenbonniv River, Graney tributary
- Glenlon Stream, Shannon Tributary.
- Glenomra River, Shannon tributary, near Kilbane
- River Graney, Scariff headwater, Lough Graney to Lough O'Grady.
  - Bleach River, headwater of River Graney, Lough Atorick to Lough Graney
  - Drumandoora River, headwater of River Graney
- Gurna River
- Hell River, near Clooney.
- Knockalisheen Stream, also named Ballycannan Stream, Shannon tributary.
- Mill Stream, Newmarket-upon-Fergus.
- Mill River, near O'Callaghan's Mills, Kilgory Lough to Doon Lough.
- Moyarta River, Shannon tributary, Loop Head Peninsula to Carrigaholt
- Moyree River, Fergus tributary, from County Galway through Dromore Lake
- Owenslieve River, Shannon tributary, near Ballynacally.
- Owenwillin River, Graney tributary, near Feakle
- Scariff Stream, Scariff
- Shallee River, west of Ennis, near Toonagh. Fergus tributary.
- Tonavoher River, Shannon tributary. Flows into Clonderlaw Bay at Knock
- Wood River, Shannon tributary, near Kilrush

== Rivers outside the Shannon-Fergus system ==
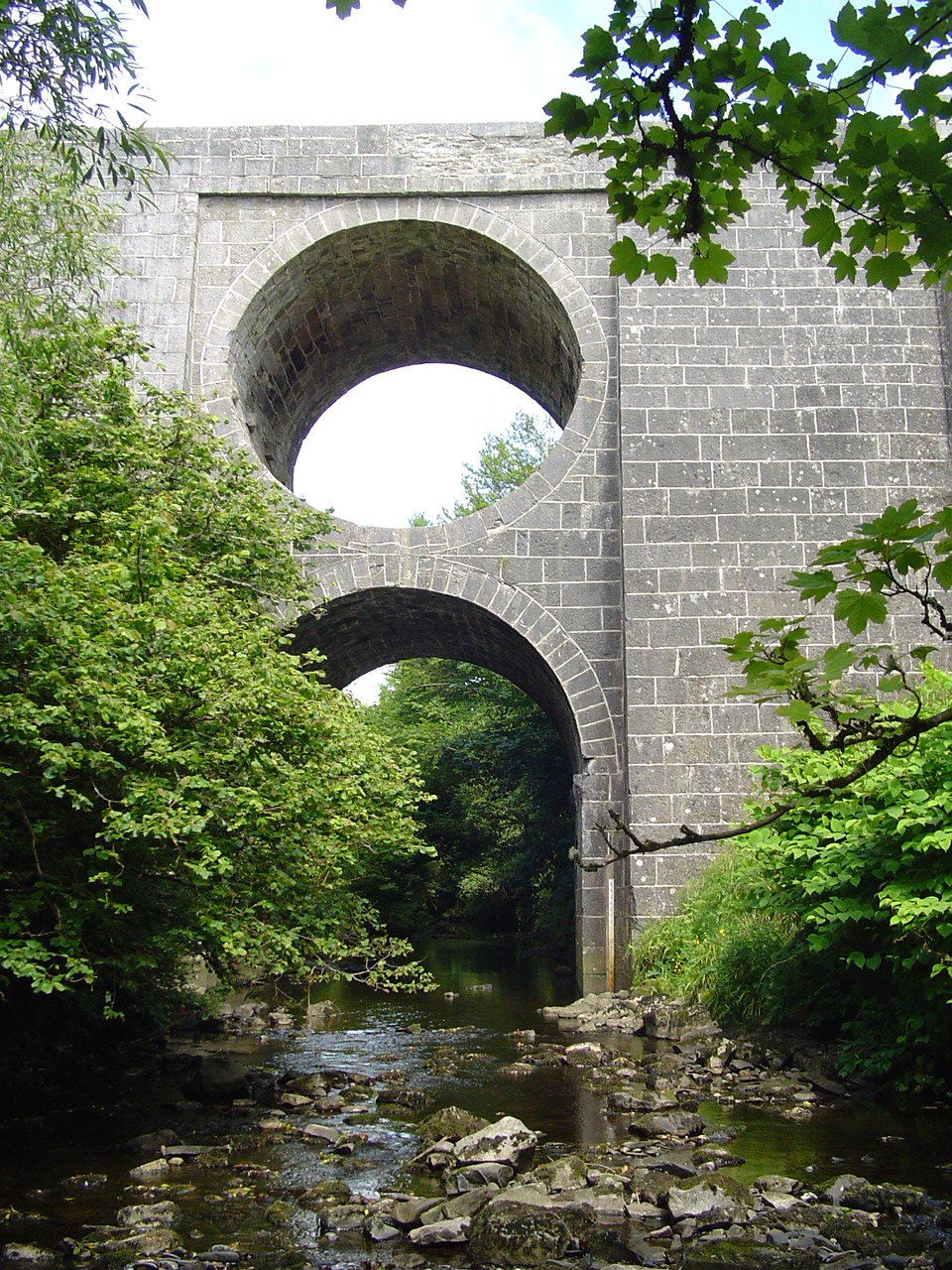
Bridge over the river Aille near Lisdoonvarna

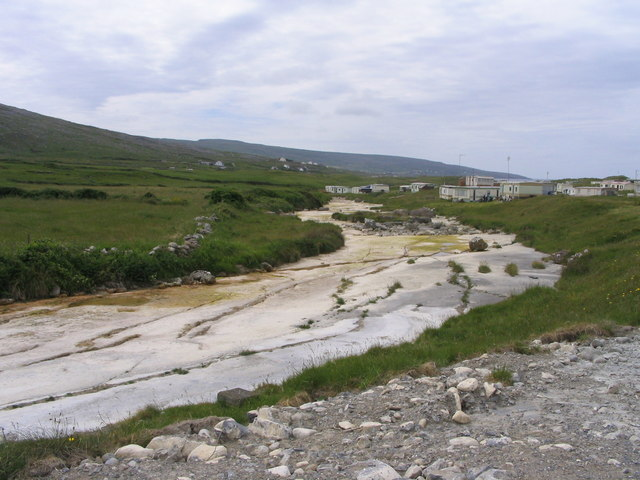
The Caher River is partly a Subterranean river, "overflowing" from beneath the rock in winters or in times of heavy rain

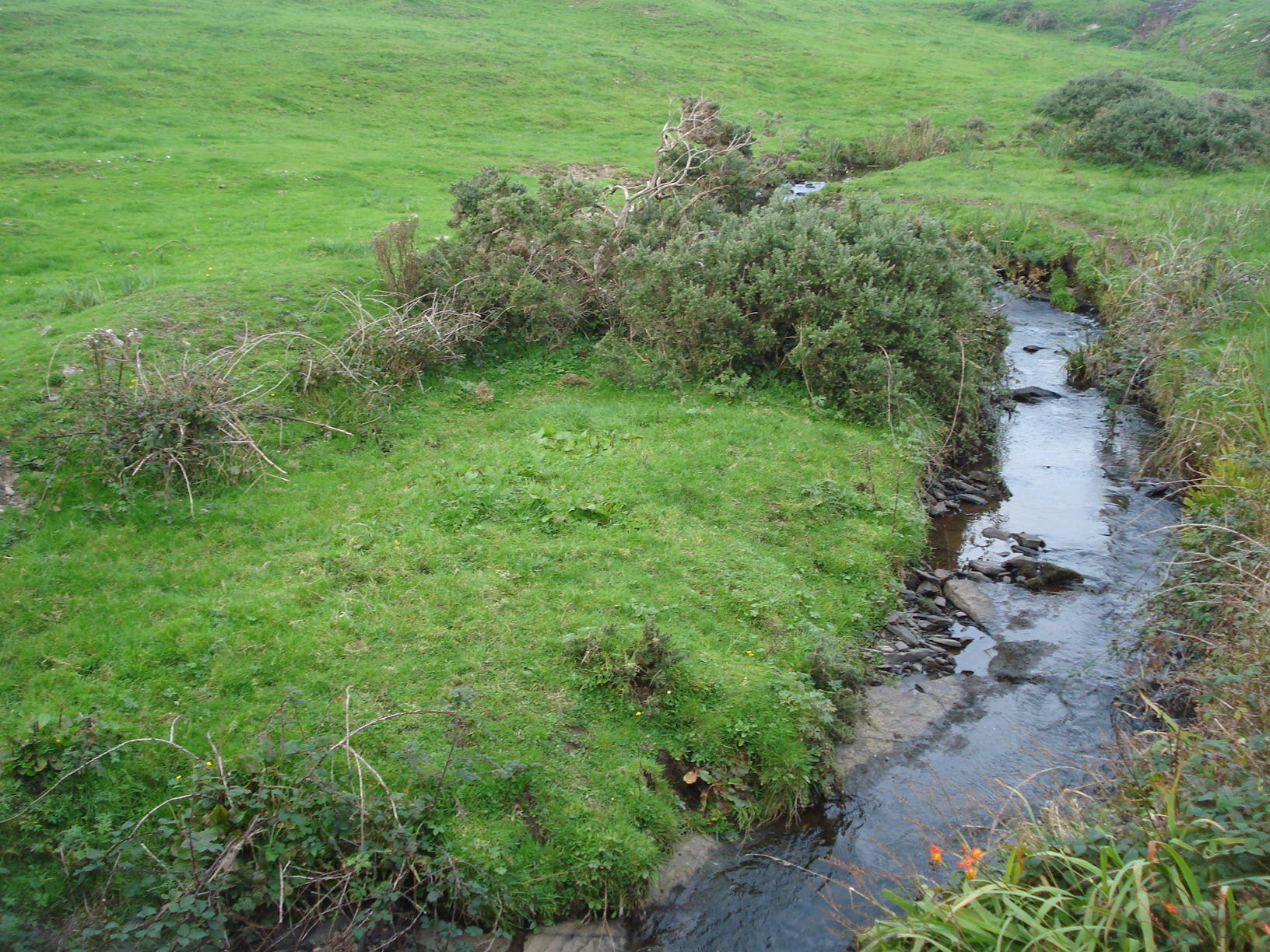
Carrowkeel River

All rivers ultimately flow into the Atlantic Ocean.

- Aille River, sometimes named as Cronagort Stream, Lisdoonvarna to Doolin, south of the Burren
- Annagh River, Slievecallan to Spanish Point, partly border of the catholic parishes Kilmurry Ibrickane and Kilfarboy
  - Kildimo River, tributary, rising on Slievecallan
- Annageeragh River, Lake Doolough through Lough Donnell, Clohaninchy
- Caher River, the only permanent overground river in the Burren (and even then with some parallel underground flow), flowing to the beach at Fanore
- Clonbony River, south of Moy to Cleadagh Bay
  - Carrowkeel River, tributary
- Clooneyogan North Stream, Lahinch
- Cooleen River, Dealagh River tributary. Near Kilshanny.
- Cree River, also spelled Creegh River or Creagh River, north of Kilmihil, through Cree to Doughmore Bay
- Dealagh River, The Burren (north of Kilfenora) to Liscannor Bay
- Doonbeg River, also named Cooraclare River, near Kilmaley, through Cooraclare to Doonbeg and Doonbeg Bay
- Dough River, Dough (townland) to Spanish Point Beach
- Gawlaun River, tributary of the Aille River, Lisdoonvarna
- Inagh River, also named Cullenagh River, southeast of Slievecallan, though Inagh and Ennistymon to Liscannor Bay
- Moy River, Moy to Liscannor Bay
- Victoria Stream. Kilkee.
