= Kilchreest =

Kilchreest Cill Chríost
- Civil parish
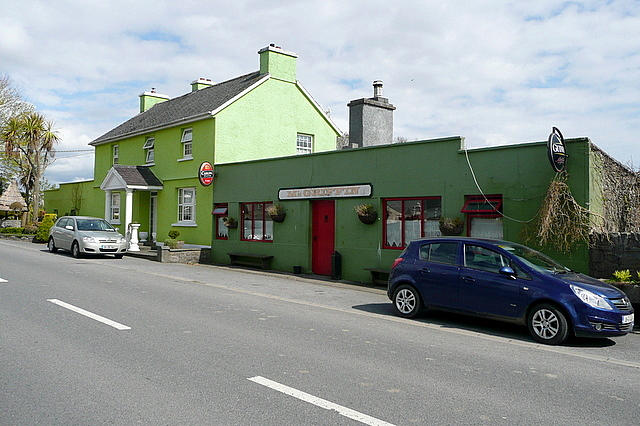
- Ballynacally, a village in Kilchreest

- Location in Ireland
- Coordinates: 52°43′11″N 9°03′59″W
- Country: Ireland
- Province: Munster
- County: County Clare
- Time zone: UTC+0 (WET)
  - Summer (DST): UTC-1 (IST (WEST))

Kilchreest (Irish: Cill Chríost) is a civil parish of County Clare, Ireland. It contains the village of Ballynacally and is part of the Roman Catholic parish of Ballynacally (Clondegad), which includes the civil parish of Clondagad to the north.

== Location ==
Kilchreest lies on the east border of the barony of Clonderalaw, 3 miles (4.8 km) northeast of Kildysart. It is 5.5 by 2.25 miles (8.85 by 3.62 km) and covers 7,061 acres (2,857 ha). The parish forms the central part of the western seaboard of the River Fergus estuary. It includes some islands, the largest being Inishmore or Deer Island.

The parish is crossed by the road from Kildysart to Ennis. It contains the village of Ballynacally. The Roman Catholic parish of Ballynacally (Clondegad) encompasses Ballynacally, Lissycasey and Ballycorick, and is part of the Diocese of Killaloe.

== Antiquity ==
"Kilchreest" means "church of Christ". Since most of the older parishes are dedicated to Irish saints, the name implies that the parish is of comparatively recent origin, The old church was plain. As of 1893 it was ruined, although the walls were still in good condition. Near to the church is the ruined castle of Dangan-moy-builc, owned by Teige MacMahon, of Clonderalaw in 1580. In 1841 the population was 2,974 in 463 houses.

Isert Kelly Castle (15th century) lies 5 km (3.1 mi) to the southwest.

== Townlands ==
Townlands are Ardnagla, Ballynacally, Ballynagard, Breaghva East, Breaghva West, Burren, Carrowkilla, Cloonfurrihis, Cloonnakilla, Coolsuppeen, Cornfield, Crininish, Fortfergus, Inishdea, Inishmore or Deerisland, Knappoge, Knocksaggart, Lack, Lavally, Leamnaleaha, Mount, Poulaphuca, Rosscliff and Tonlegee.
