= List of inland islands of Ireland =

This is a list of inland islands of Ireland, within lakes and rivers of Ireland.

== Lough islands ==
- In Lough Corrib:
  - White Goat Island
  - Inishmicatreer
  - Inchagoill
  - Inishdoorus
  - Inishdauwee
  - Booey
- In Lough Derg:
  - Inis Cealtra
- In Lower Lough Erne:
  - Ardy More
  - Boa Island
  - Buck Island
  - Car Island
  - Cleenishmeen Island
  - Coughran's Island
  - Crevinishaughy Island
  - Cruninish Island
  - Derryinch
  - Devenish Island
  - Ferny Island
  - Gall Island
  - Goat Island
  - Gravelly Island
  - Horse Island
  - Inish Beg
  - Inish Conra
  - Inish Davar
  - Inish Divann
  - Inish Doney
  - Inish Fovar
  - Inish Free
  - Inish Lougher
  - Inishmacsaint
  - Inish More
  - Inishmakill
  - Kinnausy Island
  - Leftus Island
  - Long Island
  - Lustybeg Island
  - Lustymore Island
  - Owl Island
  - Paris Island Big
  - Rabbit Island
  - Rosscor Island
  - Rough Island
  - White Island
- In Upper Lough Erne:
  - Belle Isle
  - Bleanish Island
  - Corratistune
  - Dernish Island
  - Inishcorkish
  - Inishleague
  - Inishlirroo
  - Inishlught
  - Inish Rath
  - Killygowan Island
  - Naart Island
  - Shanaghy
  - Tonregee Island
  - Traanish
  - Trasna
- In Lough Gill:
  - Lake Isle of Innisfree
  - 21 others
- In Lough Leane:
  - Innisfallen
  - and others
- In Lough Neagh:
  - Coney Island
  - Coney Island Flat
  - Croaghan Flat
  - Derrywarragh Island
  - Padian
  - Ram's Island
  - Phil Roe's Flat
  - The Shallow Flat
- In Lough Owel:
  - Browns or Grania's Island
  - Church Island
  - Carrickphilbin Island
  - Glassford Island
  - Mount Murray Island
  - Sruddorra Island
- In Lough Ree:
  - Inchcleraun (Quaker Island)
  - Hare Island

== River islands ==
- In River Shannon:
  - King's Island in Limerick
  - Canon Island
- In River Lee:
  - City Centre Island in Cork
  - Lapp's Island
- In River Suir:
  - Little Island
- In River Fergus:
  - Inishmacowney
  - Inishloe

== See also ==
- List of islands of Ireland, coastal islands
- List of islands of County Mayo (includes inland islands)
- List of rivers of Ireland
- List of loughs of Ireland
