= Canon Island Abbey =

- Mainistir Oileán na gCanánach (Irish)
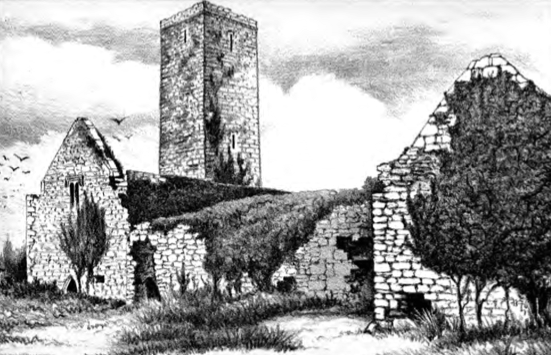
- The ruins of Canon Island Abbey, 1893

- Location within Ireland
- 52°40′44.63″N 9°2′13.4″W
- Location: Canon Island, County Clare, Ireland

History
- Built: circa 1189

National monument of Ireland
- Reference no.: 195

Canon Island Abbey (or Canons' Island Abbey) (Irish: Mainistir Oileán na gCanánach ) is a ruined Augustinian monastery located on the extreme northeast corner of Canon Island (Inisgad) on the River Shannon in County Clare, Ireland.

== History ==
Canon Island (or Innisgad) was originally called Elanagranoch. The abbey was founded in the late twelfth century. The 270 acre island was granted to the Augustinian Canons from Clare Abbey in 1189 by Domnall Mór Ua Briain (Donald O'Brien), king of Thomond.

There are no written records of the abbey until the end of the 14th century. In 1393, a papal document describes the abbey as "so destroyed alike in respect of its buildings as of its books, chalices, and likewise of its temporal goods as to be threatened with ruin". The papal letter offered indulgences to any who would help repair the abbey. The abbey was built on land donated to the Augustinian canons at Clare Abbey, but was a separate community and not dependent upon the larger abbey.

The monastery prospered until it was dissolved by Henry VIII in 1540 and the island, monastery and its associated assets and income were granted to Donogh O'Brien, 4th Earl of Thomond. By 1577, Canon Island belonged to Queen Elizabeth. The monks continued to live on the island until it was attacked by Cromewellian forces in 1651. The abbey was bombed during the attack and several monks were killed. After that time, the monastery was unable to continue its religious function.

Over the next few hundred years, ownership of the island passed thru succeeding generations of Earls of Thomond until the island eventually passed to local families. The island population was at its height in 1841 at 54 people. By 1966, the census recorded Canon Island as being uninhabited. Since 1990, an annual pilgrimage of island descendants and nearby villagers travel to Canon Island in July to celebrate mass at the abbey.

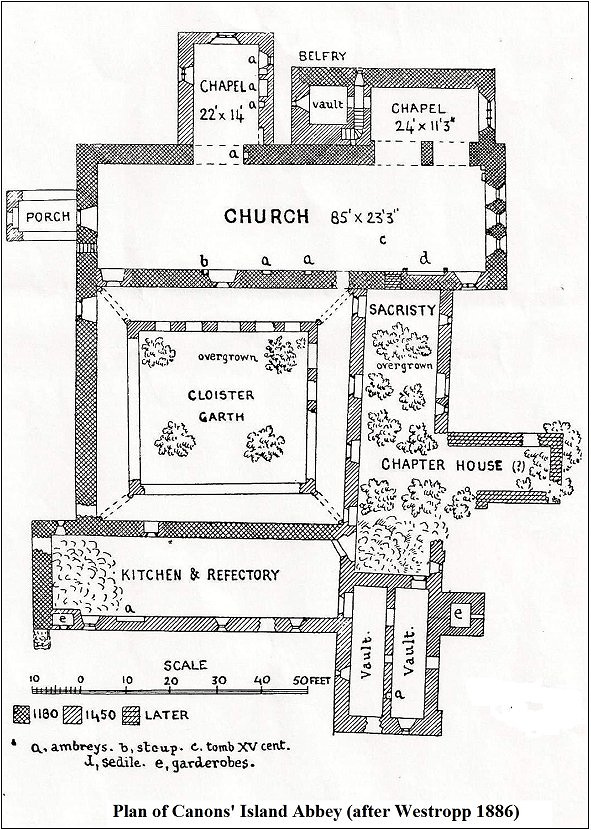
Abbey layout 1886

== Description ==
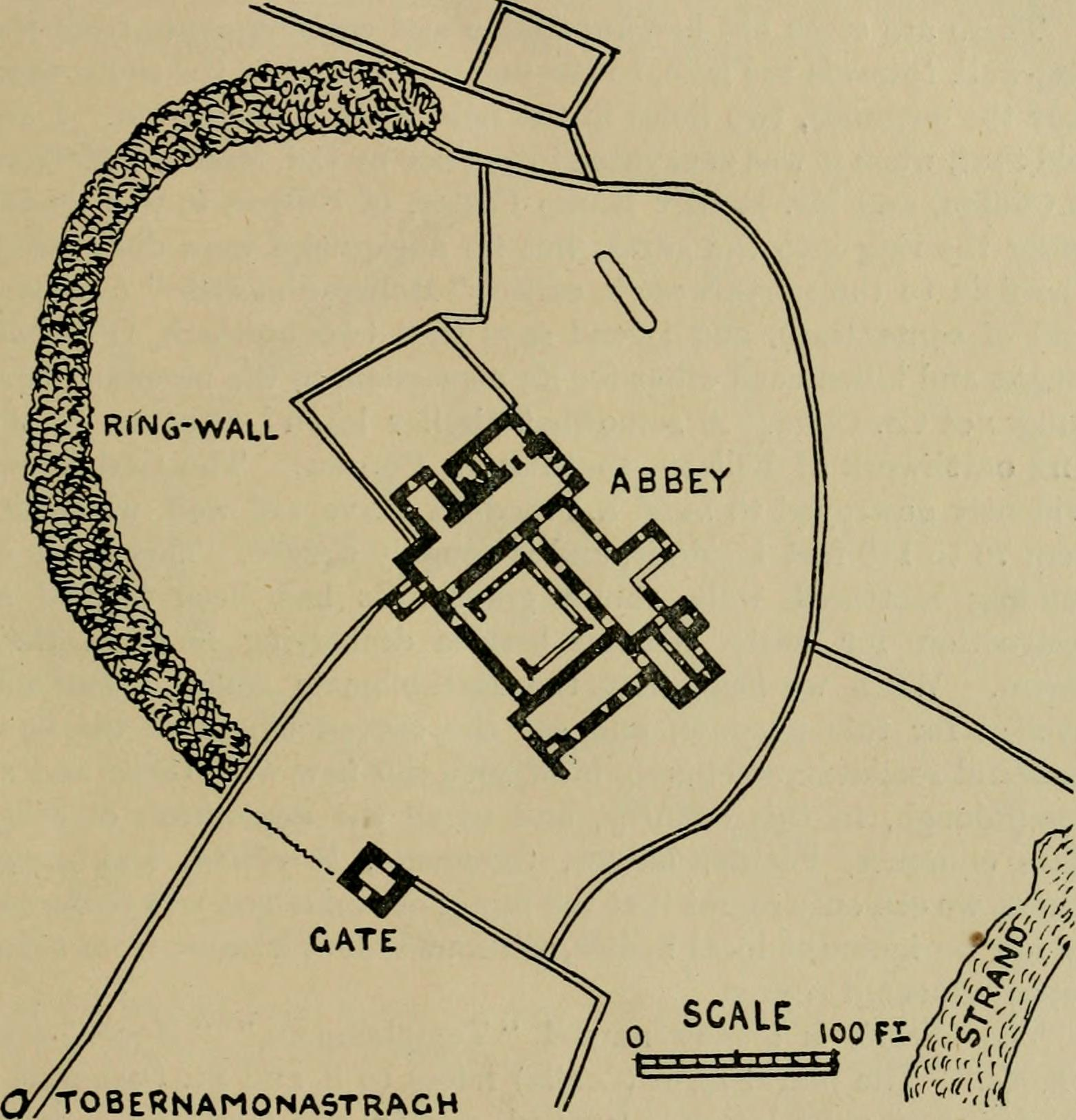
Map and floorplan, 1849

Canon Island Abbey is located on Canon Island, in County Clare, Ireland. The island is situated in the River Shannon, east of Inishtubbrid Island and 2.5 km east of the village of Kildysart. It is the largest of 25 small islands that span the crossing of the Shannon and Fergus estuaries. The abbey ruins are located on the north-eastern corner of the 270 acre island.

The remaining abbey buildings consist of a church with Romanesque windows, two adjoining chapels, a belfry, a cloister and a large square tower. Roofs are missing from all of the standing buildings. Buildings to the east would have had a sacristy, chapter house and dormitory for the monks. The south range had a kitchen and refectory. The abbey's cemetery has several graves.

== See also ==
- List of abbeys and priories in the Republic of Ireland, (County Clare)
- Cromwellian conquest of Ireland
