= Cahiracon =

Village in County Clare, Ireland

Cahiracon Cathair Dhá Chon
- Townland
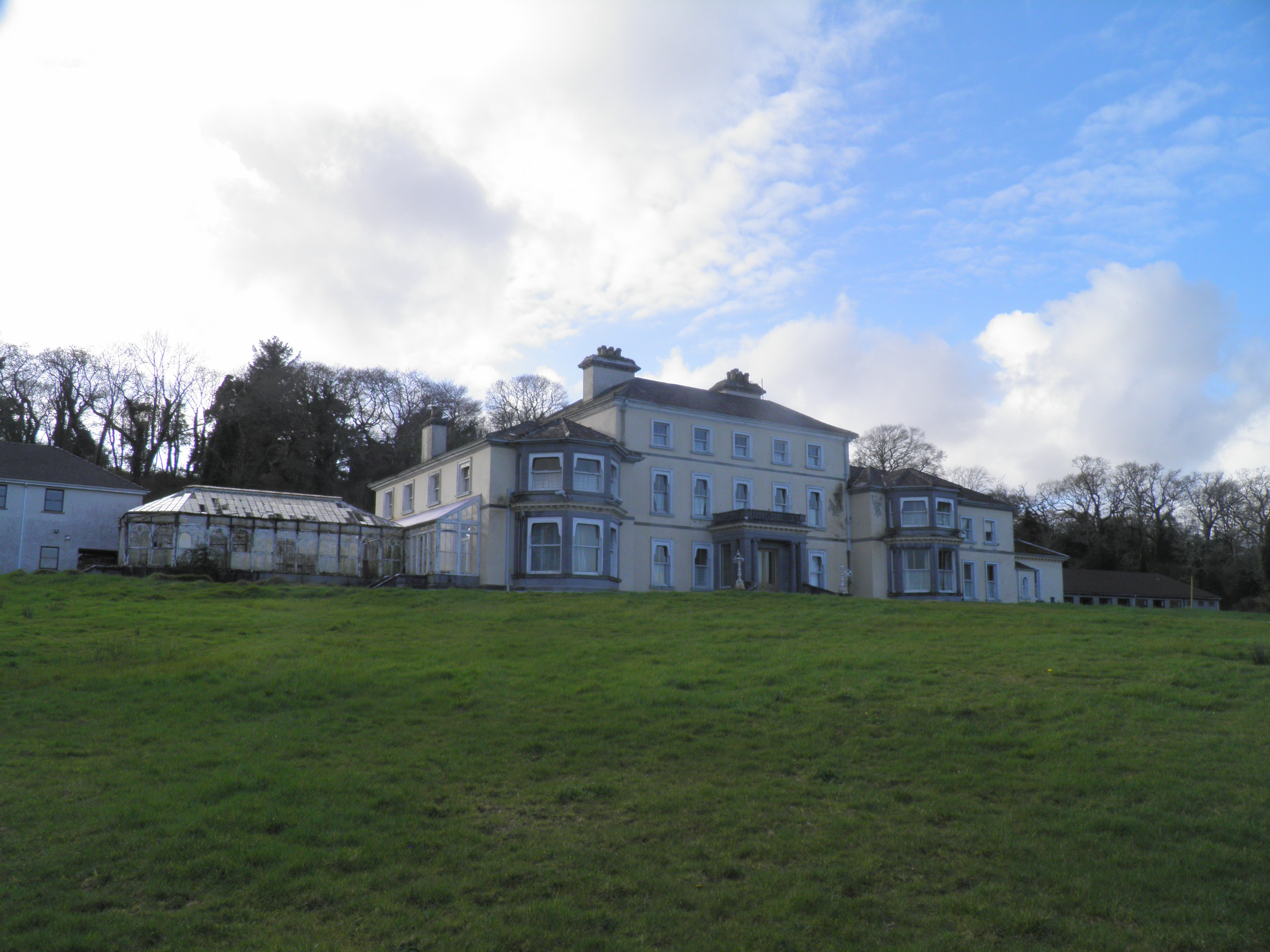
- Cahercon House

- Location in Ireland
- Coordinates: 52°38′21″N 9°08′57″W
- Country: Ireland
- Province: Munster
- County: County Clare
- Time zone: UTC+0 (WET)
  - Summer (DST): UTC-1 (IST (WEST))

Cahiracon (Irish: Cathair Dhá Chon, meaning 'stone ringfort of the two hounds'), sometimes written as Caheracon, is a hamlet and townland in County Clare, Ireland. It is located just off the R473 road and directly across the Shannon Estuary from Foynes in County Limerick. The area was home to Saint John Bosco Community College, founded in 2002 as the result of an amalgamation of two older institutions. The college later moved to a new building in Kildysart.

Cahiracon townland is within the civil parish of Killadysert and barony of Clonderalaw.

Cahiracon is also where the religious order, the Missionary Sisters of St. Columban, was formed in 1922.

== See also ==
- List of towns and villages in Ireland
