= Kilmurry McMahon (parish) =

Parish in County Clare, Ireland

- Catholic parish
- Location within Ireland
- Coordinates: 52°39′10.65″N 9°17′40.67″W
- Country: Ireland
- Province: Munster
- County: County Clare
- Time zone: UTC+0 (WET)
  - Summer (DST): UTC-1 (IST (WEST))

Kilmurry McMahon is a parish in County Clare, Ireland, and part of the Radharc na n-Oiléan grouping of parishes within the Roman Catholic Diocese of Killaloe.

As of 2022, the parish priest is Tom McGrath.

The parish is an amalgamation of the medieval parishes of Killofin and Kilmurry. The parishes were united in 1744.

== Churches ==
There are two churches in the parish.

The main church is St. Mary's Church in Kilmurry McMahon. It was built as a chapel in 1803 and later extended to a cruciform church.

The second church of the parish is St. Ciarán's church in Labasheeda. This church was built in 1976 and dedicated in 1977 by bishop Harty. It replaced an older cruciform church on the other side of the road. This church, now a community centre, was built in the mid 1830s.

== gallery ==
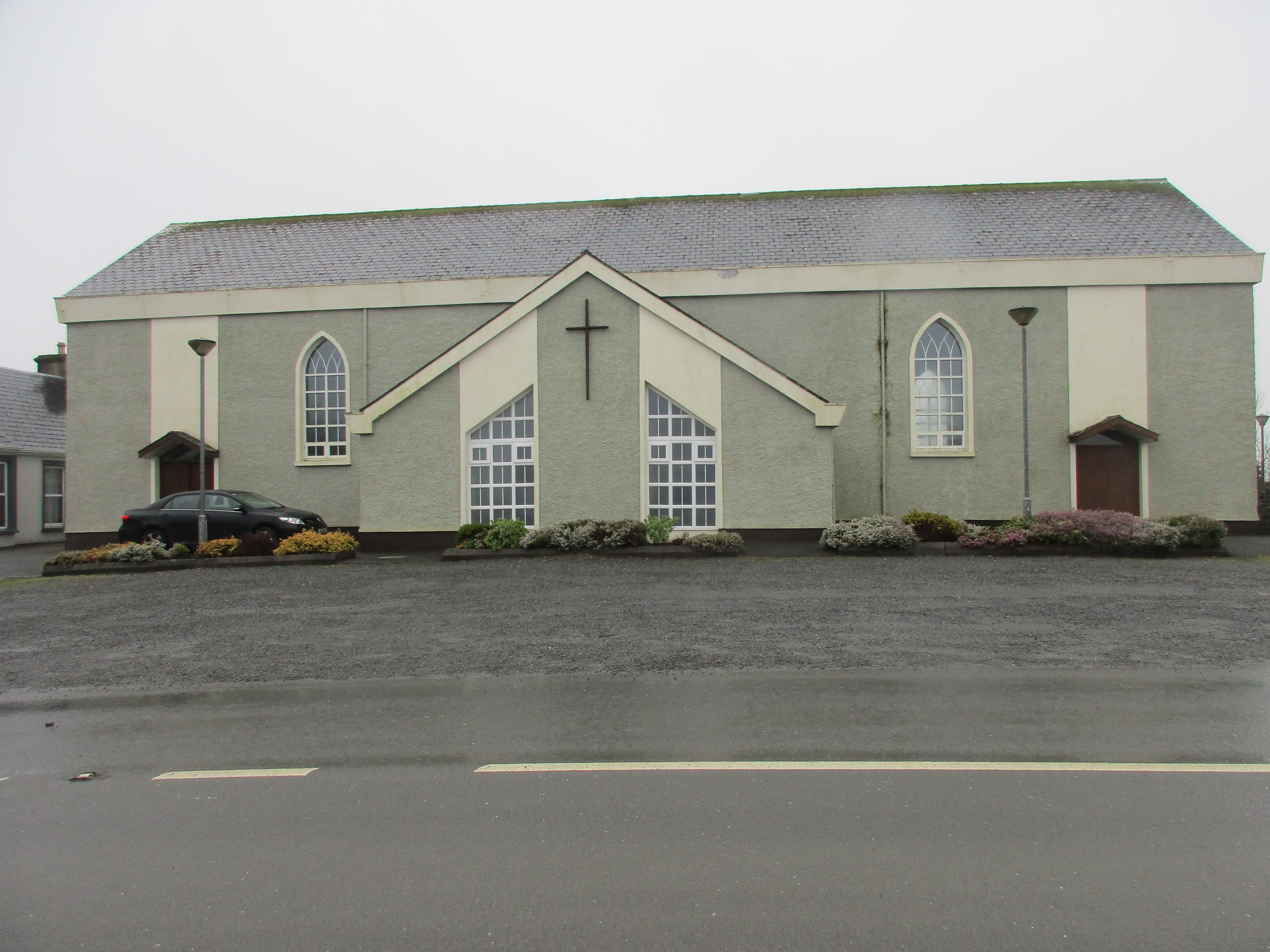
St. Mary's Church, Kilmurry McMahon

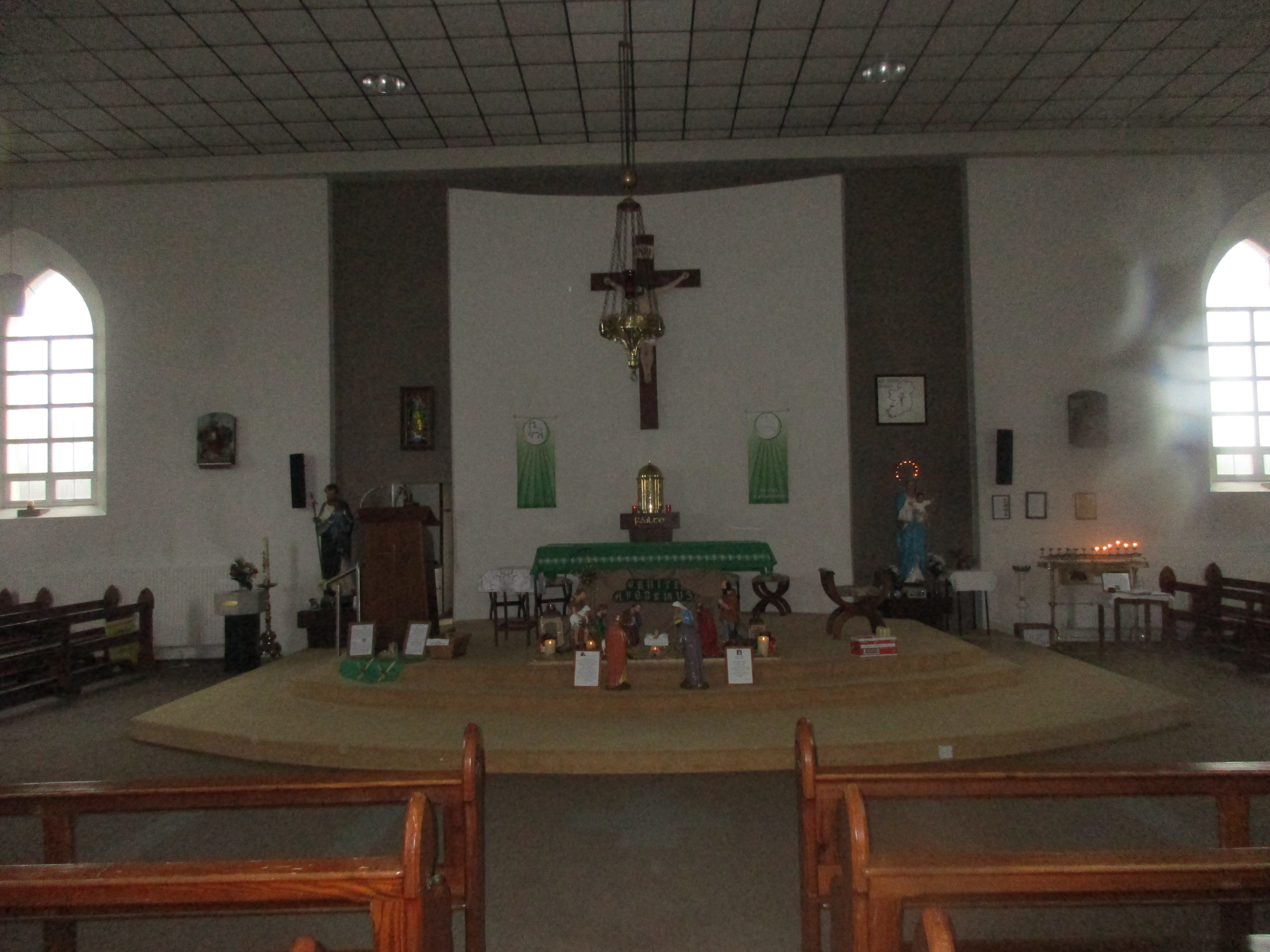
The altar of St. Mary's Church

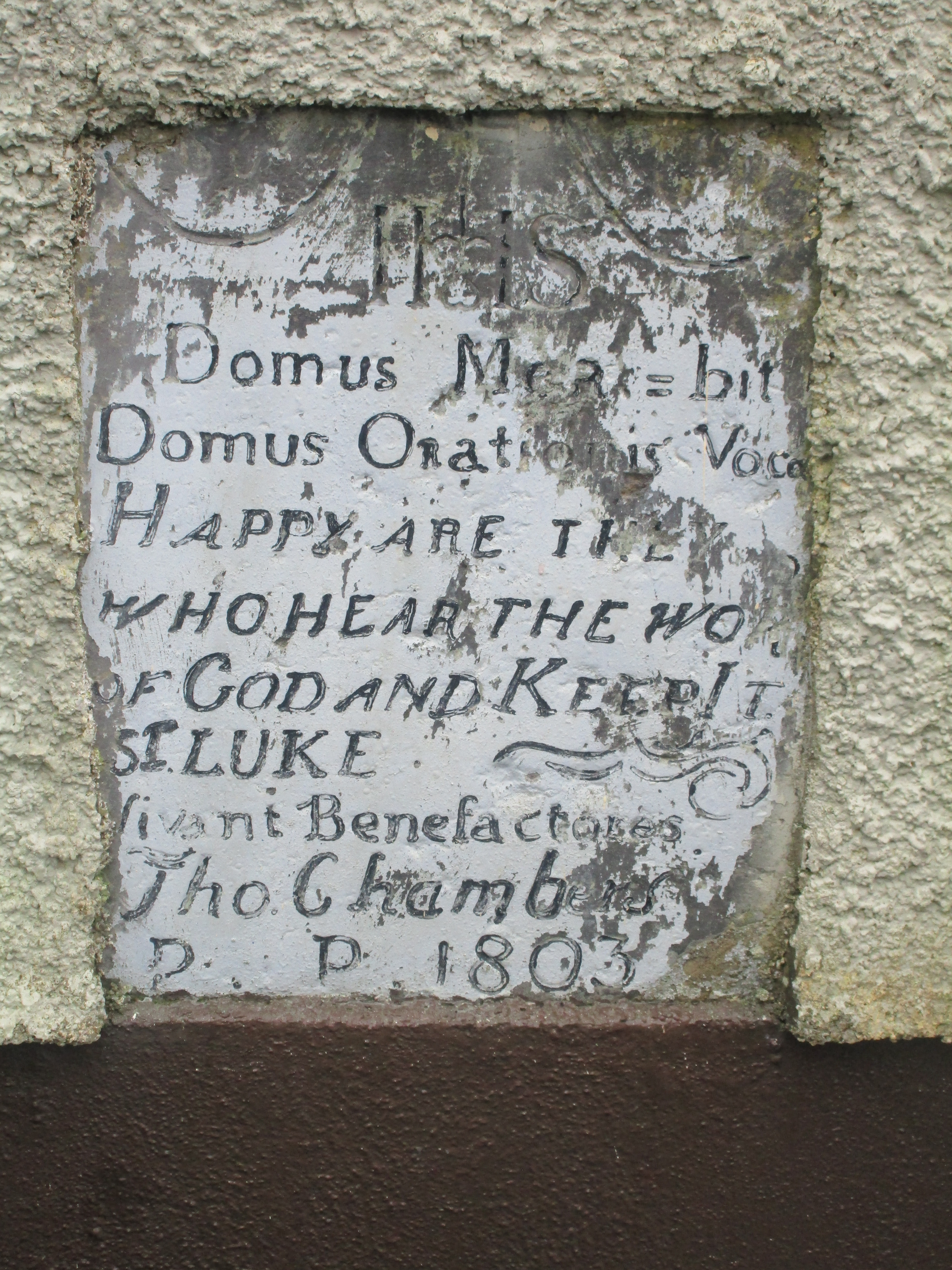
Plaque about the building in 1803

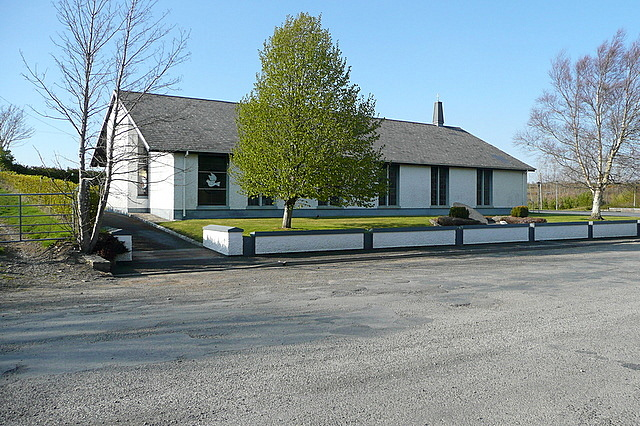
St. Ciarán's Church in Labasheeda

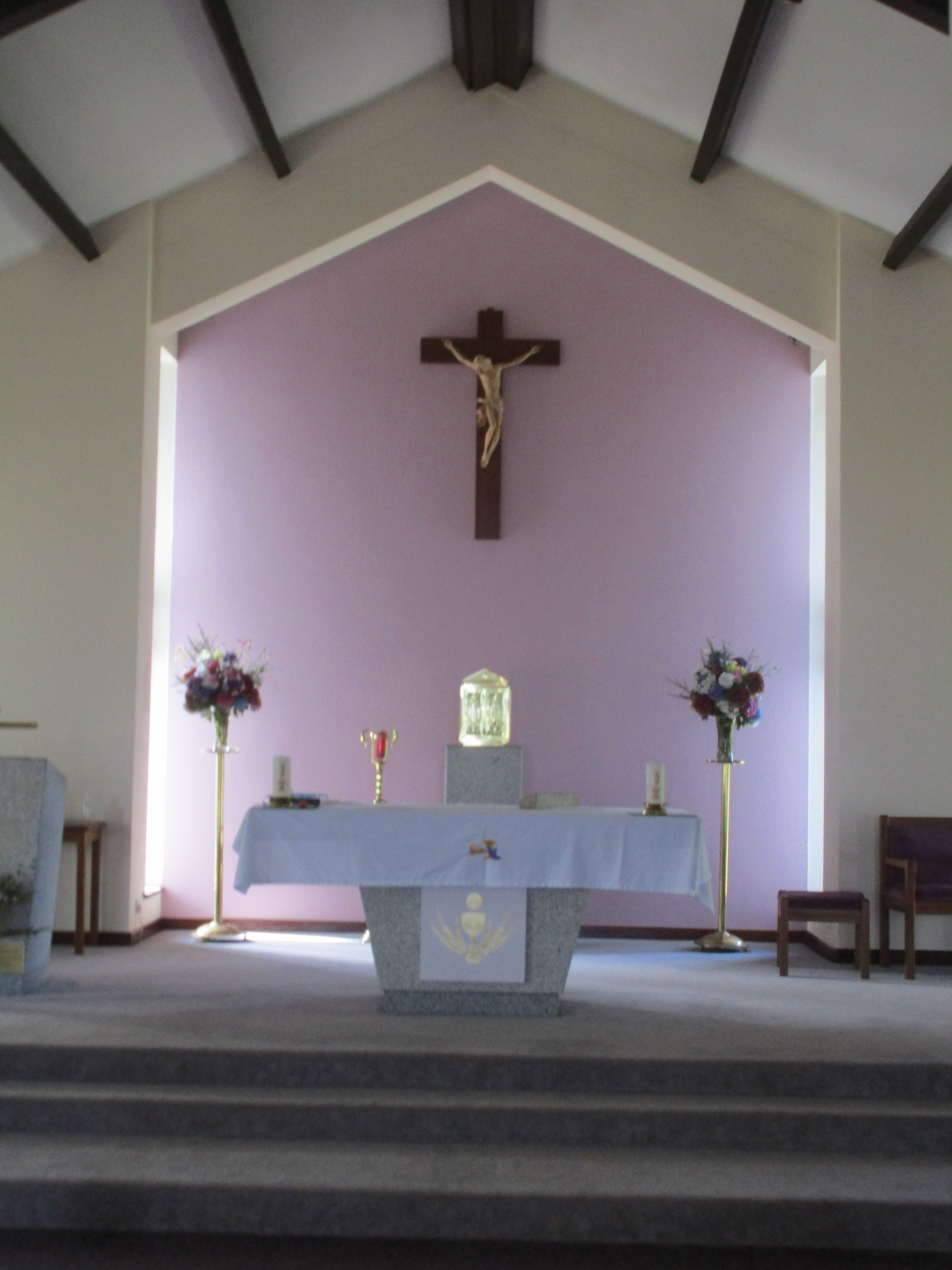
Altar of St. Ciarán's Church

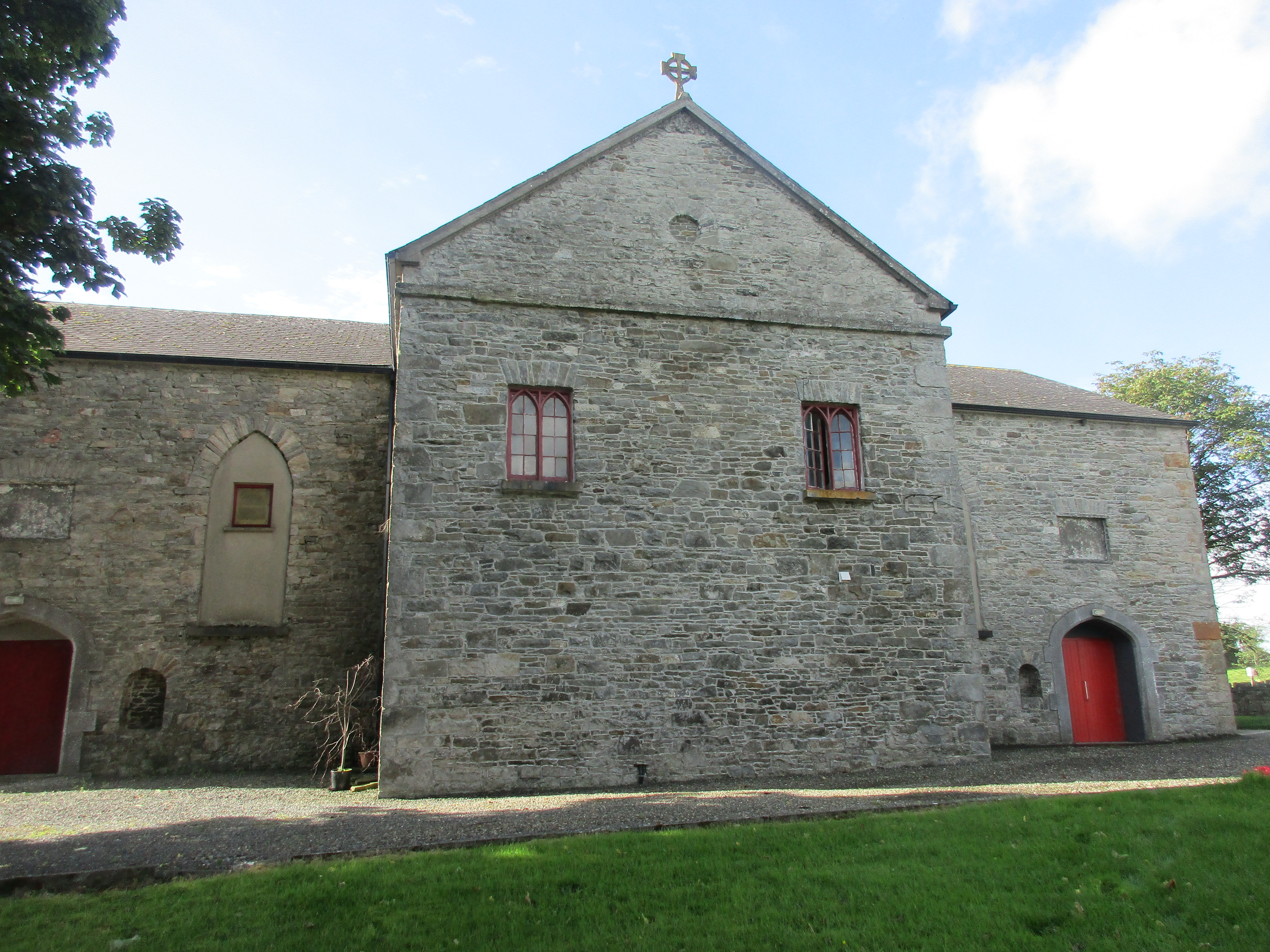
The community centre of Labasheeda, formerly the church

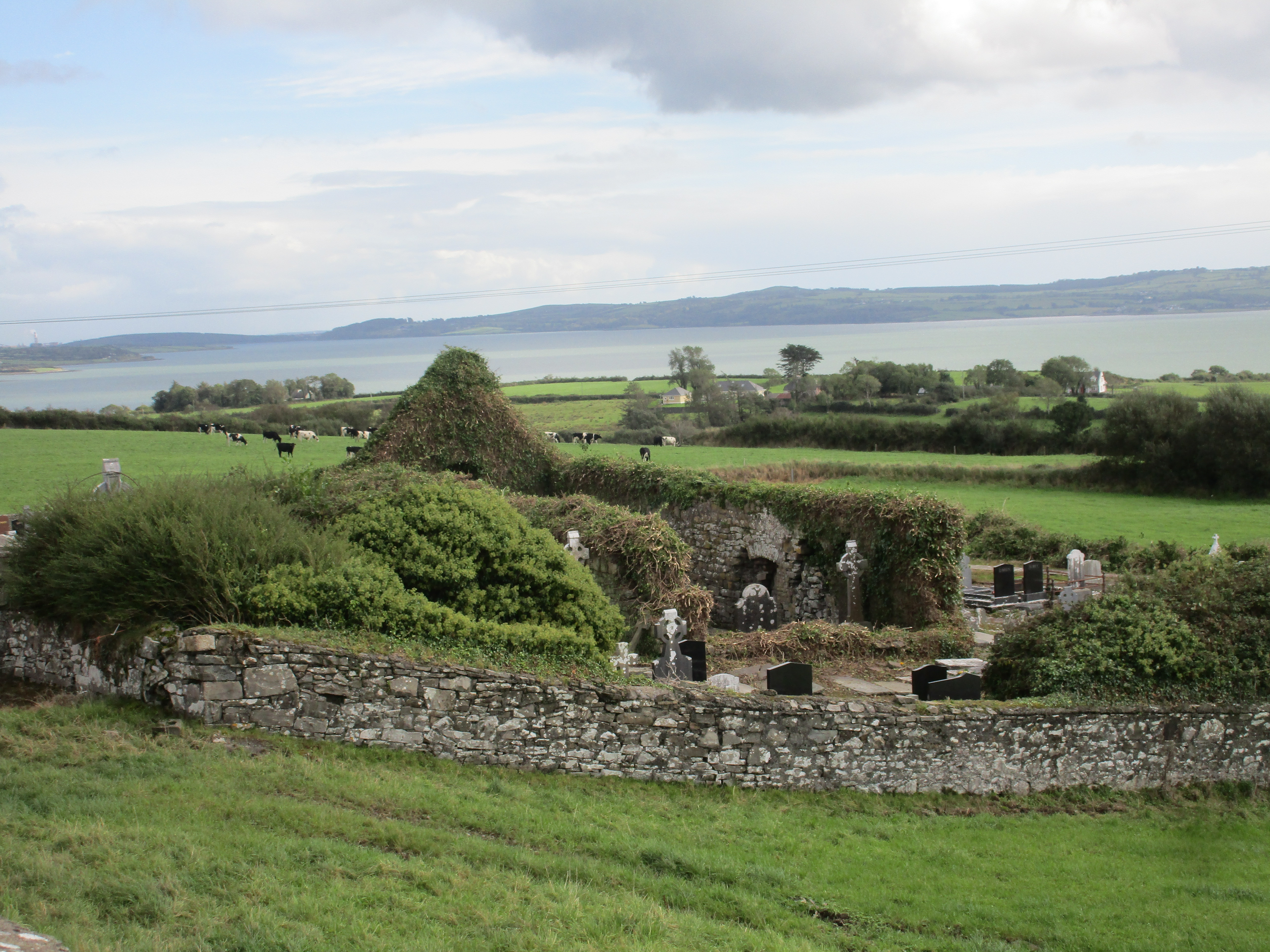
Killofin Church and graveyard.jpg
