= Inland island =

Inland island may refer to:

- Lake island, a landmass within a lake
- River island, any exposed land surrounded by river water

== See also ==
- List of Cambodian inland islands
- List of inland islands of Ireland
