= R473 road (Ireland) =

Road in Ireland

Coordinates: 52.663112°N 9.113421°W

R473 road
- Bóthar R473
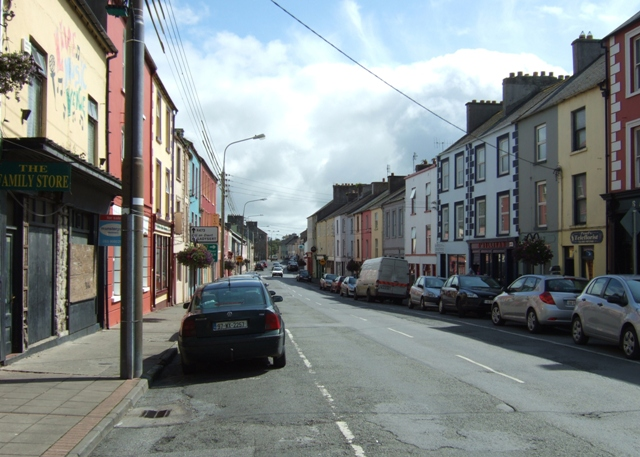
- Moore Street, Kilrush, the western extreme of the R473

Route information
- Length: 51.4 km (31.9 mi)

Major junctions
- From: N67 Kilrush
- Crosses Crompaun River at Aughanloge Bridge; R486 Carrowbane; R485 Kilmurry McMahon; Passes through Labasheeda, Kildysart, Ballynacally; Crosses Owenslieve River
- To: R458 Ennis (Clareabbey)

Location
- Country: Ireland

Highway system
- Roads in Ireland; Motorways; Primary; Secondary; Regional

The R473 road is a regional road in Ireland, located in the southern coastal parts of County Clare.
