= Killofin =

Civil parish in County Clare, Ireland

Killofin Cill Lua Finn
- Civil parish
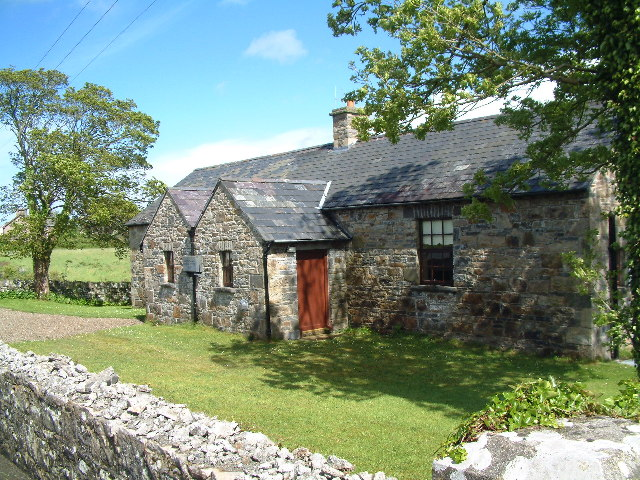
- Labasheeda School

- Location within Ireland
- Coordinates: 52°37′26″N 9°14′46″W
- Country: Ireland
- Province: Munster
- County: County Clare
- Time zone: UTC+0 (WET)
  - Summer (DST): UTC-1 (IST (WEST))
- Irish Grid Reference: R258774

Killofin (Irish: Cill Lua Finn) is a civil parish in County Clare, Ireland. It contains the village of Labasheeda and is part of the Catholic parish of Kilmurry McMahon.

== Location ==
The civil parish of Killofin is on the coast of the barony of Clonderalaw. The name comes from the O'Finn family. It is 7 miles (11 km) southwest of Kildysart. It contains the village of Labasheeda. The parish is 4 by 2.5 miles (6.4 by 4.0 km) and covers 6,692 acres (2,708 ha). The parish covers the peninsula between the east coast of Clonderalaw bay and the Shannon Estuary.

== Antiquities ==
As of 1897 the old church was in good condition, with a large churchyard. Another old church dedicated to St. Kiaran, small and very old, stood in the townland of Kilkerin. St. Kiaran’s altar is to the east of this church, and has a cross sculptured on one of the stones. The townland once called Knocknacross but now called Mountshannon West has a holy well dedicated to St. Kiaran. There are the ruins of an old castle in Ballymacolman, or Colmanstown. In 1580 it belonged to Teige MacMahon, of Clonderalaw. As of 1841 there were 3,985 people in 605 houses, of whom 3,379 in 497 houses were in rural districts.

== Townlands ==
Townlands of the civil parish of Killofin are Ballina, Ballyartney, Ballygeery East, Ballygeery West, Bohyodaun, Cloonarass, Cloonkeery East, Cloonkeery West, Colmanstown, Cullenagh, Kilkerin, Killofin, Knockphutteen, Lakyle North, Lakyle South, Mount Shannon East, Mount Shannon West and Slievedooley.

== Church ==
The Catholic parish of Kilmurry McMahon, in the Roman Catholic Diocese of Killaloe, combines the civil parishes of Kilmurry McMahon and Killofin. The church of St. Ciarán's is in Labasheeda.
