= Cúil Mhín =

Cúil Mhín (Irish for 'smooth corner') may refer to several things in Ireland:

- Coolmine, a suburb of Dublin
  - Coolmine railway station, serving the suburb
- Coolmeen, a small village in County Clare
  - Coolmeen (parish), containing the village
