= Coney Island, County Clare =

Island and townland in Ireland

Coney Island
Native name: Oileán na gCoiníní
- Location within island of Ireland

Geography
- Location: River Fergus
- Coordinates: 52.7126°N 9.0051°W

Administration
- Ireland
- Province: Munster
- County: County Clare

Demographics
- Population: 0

Coney Island (Irish: Oileán na gCoiníní), also Innisdadrom, is an island and townland in the estuary of the River Fergus in County Clare, Ireland. The island was named for its abundance of rabbits (coneys).

== Geography ==
Coney Island lies in the centre of the River Fergus estuary. In 1837, it was measured at 226 acres. Nearby islands include Deer Island, Feenish and Trummer.

== History and archaeology ==
Coney Island has two sets of church ruins. The older church was founded by Saint Brendan in 550.

== Population ==
In 1837 there were ten families living on the island, the population peaked at 145 in 1841. The island has been uninhabited since 1986.

Historical population

Year	Pop.	±%
1841	145	—
1851	129	−11.0%
1861	119	−7.8%
1871	90	−24.4%
1881	70	−22.2%
1891	48	−31.4%
1901	44	−8.3%
1911	35	−20.5%

Year	Pop.	±%
1926	41	+17.1%
1936	35	−14.6%
1946	23	−34.3%
1951	23	+0.0%
1956	23	+0.0%
1961	22	−4.3%
1966	22	+0.0%
1971	6	−72.7%

Year	Pop.	±%
1979	2	−66.7%
1981	2	+0.0%
1986	0	−100.0%
1991	0	0.00%
1996	0	0.00%
2002	0	0.00%
2006	0	0.00%
2011	0	0.00%

Source: "CNA17: Population by Off Shore Island". Central Statistics Office (Ireland).
