= Dan Furey =

Irish dance teacher and fiddle player

- Born: 12 September 1909; England
- Died: 7 August 1993 (aged 83); Lackyle, Labasheeda
- Resting place: Killofin cemetery, Labasheeda
- Occupations: farmer, dance teacher, fiddler
- Known for: dance classes

Dan Furey (England, 12 September 1909 - Lackyle, Labasheeda, 7 August 1993) was an Irish dance teacher and fiddle player. Furey specialized in classes for set dancing, céilí dancing and step dancing.

Furey started in the 1930s with his lessons. At first only local, later in the whole of West-Clare, normally travelling by bicycle. In that period, many primary schools invited him to give lessons. From there his fame as dance teacher and fiddler spread and in the 1980s he was invited to give lessons in Great Britain and the United States.

In 1993, he fell ill and was hospitalized in Ennis General Hospital. There he drove doctors and nursing staff berserk, by keeping dancing, even in bed. The climax came during the Willie Clancy Summer School in July 1993, when a party of musicians broke away from the school and organized a seisiún.

== Festival ==
Labasheeda organised a dance festival in 1995 in Furey's memory. Former students showed up from all over Ireland, United States and Great Britain. The festival continues to operate.
