= Lough Cullaun =

Lake in County Clare, Ireland

- Location in Ireland
- Location: County Clare
- Coordinates: 52°57′41″N 9°1′13″W
- Catchment area: 13.2 km^{2} (5.1 sq mi)
- Basin countries: Ireland
- Max. length: 1.5 km (0.9 mi)
- Max. width: 0.4 km (0.2 mi)
- Surface area: 0.5 km^{2} (0.19 sq mi)
- Average depth: 6.7 m (22 ft)
- Surface elevation: 16 m (52 ft)

Lough Cullaun is a freshwater lake in the Mid-West Region of Ireland. It is located in The Burren of County Clare.

== Geography and hydrology ==
Lough Cullaun measures about 1.5 km (0.9 mi) long and 0.5 km (0.3 mi) wide. It is about 15 km (9 mi) north of Ennis near the village of Corofin. The lake flows out to neighbouring Lough Atedaun.

== Natural history ==
Fish species in Lough Cullaun include brown trout, perch, rudd, pike and the critically endangered European eel. The lake is part of the East Burren Complex Special Area of Conservation. It is also part of the Corofin Wetlands Special Protection Area.

== See also ==
- List of loughs in Ireland
- List of Special Areas of Conservation in the Republic of Ireland
