= Ballyallia Lake =

Lake on the River Fergus, near Ennis in County Clare, Ireland

- Ballyallia Lough
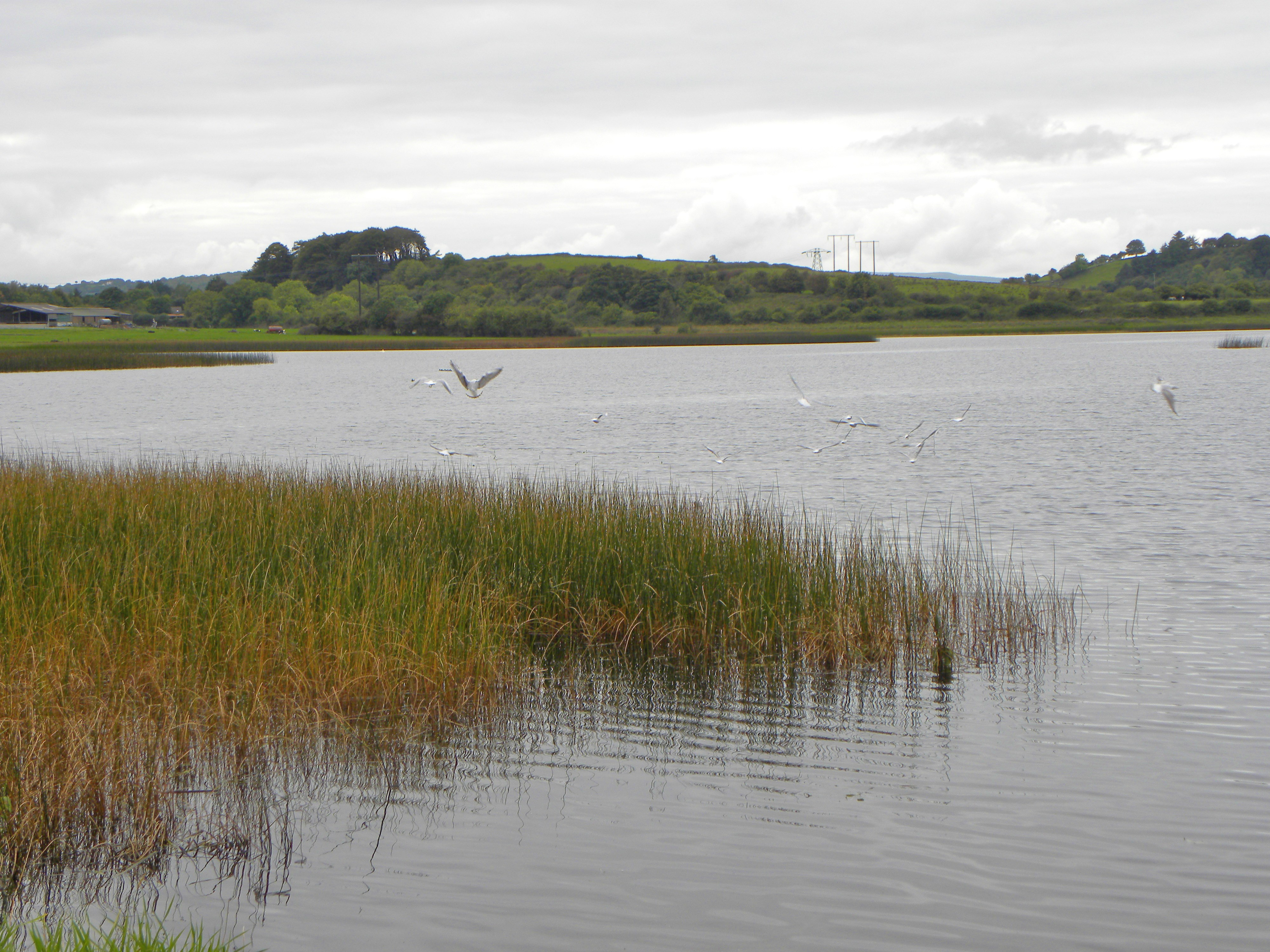

- Location within Ireland
- Location: County Clare, Ireland
- Coordinates: 52.876°N 8.980°W
- Type: lake
- Surface area: 308 hectares (760 acres)

Ballyalla Lake, also known as Ballyallia Lough, is a small lake on the River Fergus, north of the town of Ennis in County Clare, Ireland. It covers an area of 308 hectares (760 acres), it is an important site for waterbirds, and has been recognised as a wetland of international importance under the Ramsar Convention. It is protected by the Irish National Parks and Wildlife Service as a wildfowl sanctuary, meaning that shooting game birds is not allowed at the lake.
