= Lough Atedaun =

Freshwater lake in County Clare, Ireland

- Loch an tSéideáin (Irish)
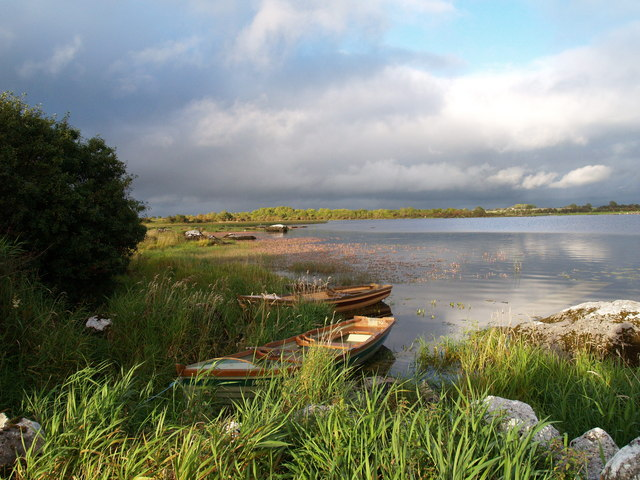

- Location in Ireland
- Location: County Clare
- Coordinates: 52°56′33″N 9°2′39″W
- Primary inflows: River Fergus
- Primary outflows: River Fergus
- Catchment area: 176.63 km^{2} (68.2 sq mi)
- Basin countries: Ireland
- Max. length: 1 km (0.6 mi)
- Max. width: 0.6 km (0.4 mi)
- Surface area: 0.38 km^{2} (0.15 sq mi)
- Average depth: 2.3 m (7 ft 7 in)
- Max. depth: 7 m (23 ft)
- Surface elevation: 13 m (43 ft)

Lough Atedaun (Irish: Loch an tSéideáin) is a freshwater lake in the Mid-West Region of Ireland. It is located in The Burren of County Clare.

== Geography ==
Lough Atedaun measures about 1 km (0.6 mi) long and 0.5 km (0.3 mi) wide. It is about 15 km (9 mi) north of Ennis near the village of Corofin.

== Hydrology ==
Lough Atedaun lies along the River Fergus which flows in from neighbouring Inchiquin Lough. Nearby Lough Cullaun also flows in to Lough Atedaun. The lake is highly eutrophic.

== Natural history ==
Fish species in Lough Atedaun include perch, rudd, pike, stone loach and the critically endangered European eel. The lake is part of the East Burren Complex Special Area of Conservation. It is also part of the Corofin Wetlands Special Protection Area.

== See also ==
- List of loughs in Ireland
