= Trummer =

River island in Ireland

Trummer Island
- Location within island of Ireland

Geography
- Location: River Fergus
- Coordinates: 52.705°N 9.032°W

Administration
- Ireland
- Province: Munster
- County: Clare

Demographics
- Population: 0

Trummer is an uninhabited island in the River Fergus in County Clare, Ireland. It is located between Deer Island and Coney Island.

The island falls within the Lower River Shannon Special Area of Conservation.
