= Clondagad =

Civil parish in County Clare, Ireland

Clondagad Cluain Dá Ghad
- Civil parish
- Location in Ireland
- Coordinates: 52°44′17″N 9°04′57″W
- Country: Ireland
- Province: Munster
- County: County Clare
- Time zone: UTC+0 (WET)
  - Summer (DST): UTC-1 (IST (WEST))

Clondagad (Irish: Cluain Dá Ghad) is a civil parish of County Clare, Ireland. It centres on Clondagad House, which is 16 kilometres (10 mi) by road southwest of Ennis. Clondagad House is a three-bay two-storey house dated to around 1820.

== Geography ==
The civil parish of Clondagad is in the southern part of the county and is bordered by Kilmaley to the north, Killone to the northeast, Kilchreest to the southeast, Kilfiddane to the southwest, and Kilmikil to the west. It is divided into 25 townlands:

- Ballycloghessy
- Ballycorick
- Beneden
- Breaghva
- Caherea
- Cappanageeragh
- Clooncolman
- Cloondrinagh
- Cloonmore
- Cragbrien
- Craggykerrivan
- Dehomad
- Drumquin
- Furroor
- Gortnamuck
- Gortygeeheen
- Inishaellaun
- Knockalehid
- Lanna
- Lavally (North)
- Lavally (South)
- Liscasey
- Lisheen
- Lismorris
- Toberaniddaun

== See also ==
- List of townlands of County Clare
