= Feenish =

Island and townland in County Clare, Ireland

Native name: Fínis
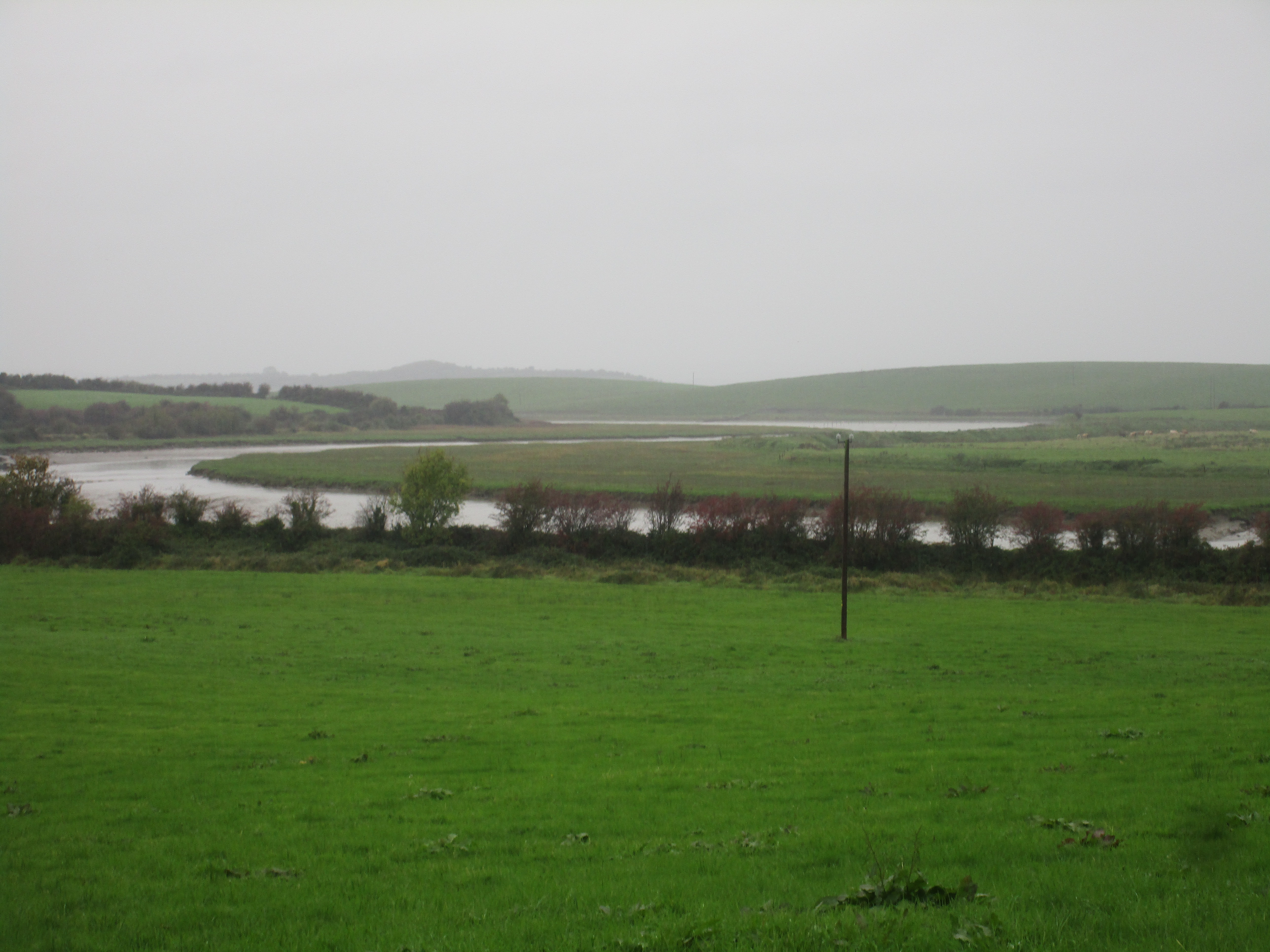
- Feenish seen in the back

- Location within island of Ireland

Geography
- Location: River Fergus
- Coordinates: 52.704°N 8.974°W

Administration
- Ireland
- Province: Munster
- County: County Clare

Demographics
- Population: 0

Feenish (Irish: Fínis), formerly Finish Island, is an island and townland in the estuary of the River Fergus in County Clare, Ireland.

== Geography ==
Feenish lies near the eastern shore of the River Fergus estuary. The island's area is 179 acres. Feenish was formerly attached to the neighbouring island of Inishmacnaghtan. Other nearby islands include Deer Island and Coney Island.

== History and archaeology ==
Feenish was formerly the site of a convent built by Saint Senan in the sixth century and run by a local Saint Brigid (not Brigid of Kildare). There are ruins of a castle on the island's northeastern side.

== Population ==
In the 19th century there were seven families living on the island. The island has been uninhabited since at least 1901.
