= Clonderalaw =

Historical barony in County Clare, Ireland

Clonderalaw Cluain idir Dhá Lá
- Location within Ireland
- Coordinates: 52.673936°N 9.107594°W
- Country: Ireland
- Province: Munster
- County: Clare

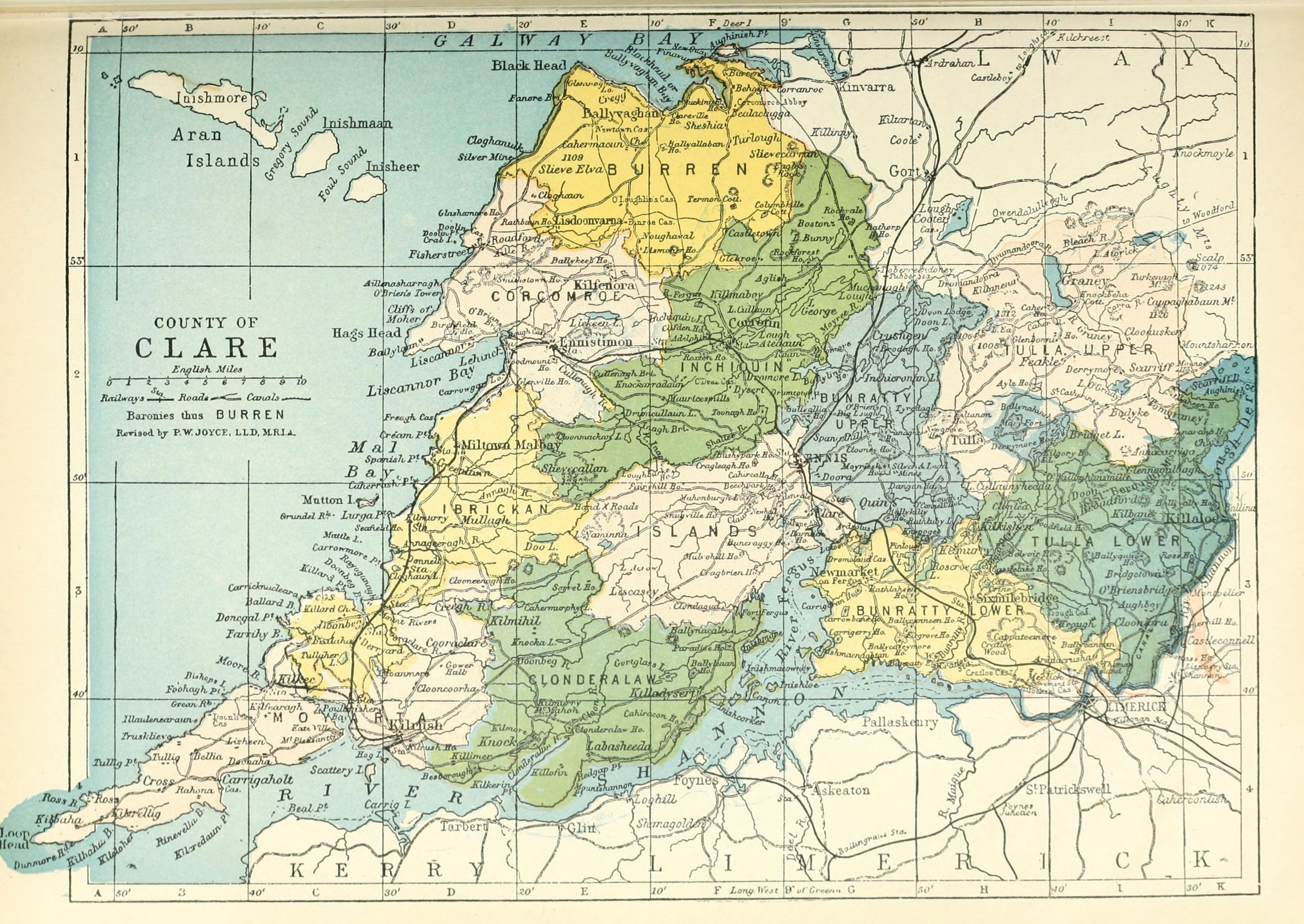
Baronies of Clare. Clonderalaw is in the south.

Clonderalaw (Irish: Cluain idir Dhá Lá) is an historical barony in County Clare, Ireland. Baronies are geographical divisions of land that are in turn is divided into civil parishes.

== Legal context ==
Baronies were created after the Norman invasion of Ireland as administrative divisions of counties. While baronies have been administratively obsolete since 1898, they continue to be used in some land registration contexts and in planning permissions. In some cases, a barony corresponds to an earlier Gaelic túath which had submitted to the British Crown.

== Landscape ==
The Parliamentary Gazetteer of Ireland of 1845 describes the barony of Clonderalaw as follows,

It is bounded, on the north, by the barony of Islands; on the east, by the estuary of the Fergus; on the south, by the estuary of the Shannon; and, on the west, by the baronies of Moyarta and Ibrickane. Its greatest length, from east to west, is 12½ miles; its greatest breadth, from north to south, is 10½; and its area is 98,541 acres, 1 rood, 6 perches, of which 23,028 acres, 2 roods, 12 perches are fresh water, and 22,660 acres, 3 roods, 32 perches are tideway of the estuaries of the Fergus and the Shannon. Its east coast is very frequently but not boldly indented, and is flanked by the numerous green and beauteous isles of the Fergus; and its south coast is very sweepingly varied in outline by the projection of the Clonderalaw peninsula, and the deep incision on this peninsula’s west side of Clonderalaw bay. The surface of the barony, excepting a belt of rich, beautiful low ground along the coast, consists largely of bog and moorish mountain; but, in consequence of abundance of lime being procurable with little trouble and at small expense, it is highly improvable. The streams are all mere rivulets and rills: the principal falls into Clonderalaw bay; but the greater number run eastward to the Fergus

== History ==
In 1841 the population of Clonderalaw was 29,413 in 4,566 houses. Most were employed in agriculture.

== Parishes and settlements ==
The barony contains the parishes of Kilchrist, Kildysart, Kilfidane, Killimer, Killofin, Kilmichael, and Kilmurray. The main villages are Ballynacally, Kildysart, Labasheeda, Knock, and Kilmichael. It contains old castles of Clonderalaw, Donogorogue, Redgap, Colesmanstown, Dangan, Crownaghan, Horse-Island, and Cahirmurphy.
