= Ballynacally =

Village in County Clare, Ireland

Ballynacally Baile na Caillí
- Village
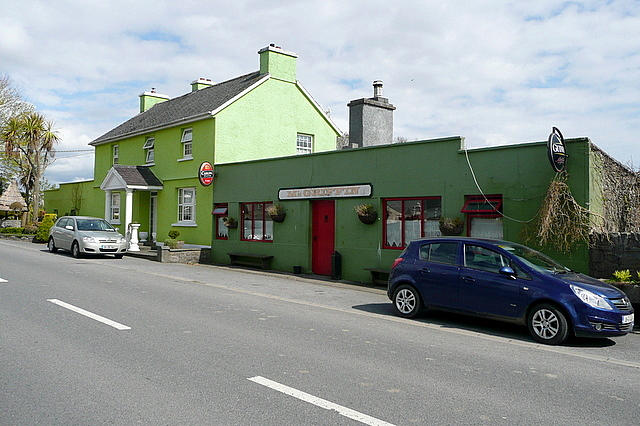

- Location in Ireland
- Coordinates: 52°43′6.52″N 9°4′1.08″W
- Country: Ireland
- County: County Clare
- Barony: Clonderalaw
- Civil parish: Kilchreest
- Time zone: UTC+0 (WET)
  - Summer (DST): UTC+1 (IST (WEST))

Ballynacally (Irish: Baile na Caillí) is a village and townland situated 16.7 km (10.4 mi) southwest of Ennis, on the R473 coast road to Kilrush in the civil parish of Kilchreest, County Clare, Ireland. It lies near the bank of the River Shannon.

== History ==
Ballynacally derives from Baile na Caillí. This means "the nun's land", because it belonged to the nuns of Killone Convent. It is home to many historical structures and monuments. The area is known to have been visited by St. Brendan and St. Senan who established monasteries in the islands. The Vikings looted the churches while travelling up the Shannon to Limerick. During the Norman period nuns occupied the Kilchreest area, and Norman castles were erected at Dangan, Ballycorick, and Cragbrien. The ruins of the Dangan tower still remain.

Ballynacally was a former parish. Samuel Lewis's ''County Clare: A History and Topography (1837) mentioned that the villagers produced corn, butter, pork, and other agricultural produce which was loaded into boats in the quay and taken along the river to Limerick, and that limestone and sea manure were produced for the community. He also mentioned that Ballynacally held several cattle fairs throughout the year. In 1841 the townland had an area of 12 acres and a population of 194 people living in 29 houses. In the 19th century, the village developed a reputation for its fine "faction fighters" (see bataireacht), who possessed a "superior skill with the stick".

Professor Thomas Rice Henn in the mid 20th century described Ballynacally as "a straggling village, with its one street and five public houses, crossing a bridge over a lesser stream" in his memoirs The Five Arches.

== Geography ==
Ballynacally is situated 16.7 km (10.4 mi) southwest of Ennis, on the R473 coast road to Kilrush in the parish of Kilchreest, County Clare. It lies near the bank of the River Shannon. To the north, Ballycorick Creek flows into the Shannon. Ballynacally is bordered by the townlands of Carrowkilla to the north, Knocksaggart to the northeast, Rosscliff to the east, Ballynagard to the south, Cloonnakilla to the west, and Ardnagla to the northwest.

The village lies in the civil parish of Kilchreest The Roman Catholic parish of Ballynacally (Clondegad) encompasses Ballynacally, Lissycasey and Ballycorick, and is part of the Diocese of Killaloe.

== See also ==
- List of towns and villages in Ireland
