= Kilbane =

Kilbane is a surname. Notable people with the surname include:

- James Kilbane (born 1970), Irish Christian country, gospel and country singer
- Johnny Kilbane (1889–1957), American boxer
- Kevin Kilbane (born 1977), Irish footballer
- Pat Kilbane (born 1969), American actor, comedian and screenwriter
- Sally Conway Kilbane (born 1942), American politician
