= White Goat Island =

Island in Ireland

White Goat
Native name: Oileán a' Ghabhair Ghil
- Location within island of Ireland

Geography
- Location: Lough Corrib
- Coordinates: 53.505675°N 9.439607°W

Administration
- Ireland
- Province: Connacht
- County: Galway

White Goat Island (Irish: Oileán a' Ghabhair Ghil, "Island of the White Goat") is a small island off the north shore of Lough Corrib, close to Cornamona, in County Galway, Ireland. The three acre island was named after the prominent quartzite rock found on the south-west shore of the island.
