= Coolmeen (parish) =

Catholic parish in County Clare, Ireland

Coolmeen Cúil Mhín
- Parish
- Location within Ireland
- Coordinates: 52.649887°N 9.21573°W
- Country: Ireland
- Province: Munster
- County: Clare

Coolmeen (Irish: Cúil Mhín), formerly called Kilfiddane (Irish: Cill Fheadáin), is a Roman Catholic parish in County Clare, Ireland.

== Location ==
The parish lies in the southeast of the barony of Clonderalaw. It is 4.5 miles (7.2 km) southwest of Kildysart. The parish is 7 by 3 miles (11.3 by 4.8 km) and covers 13,733 acres (5,558 ha). It extends from the River Fergus estuary westward along the Shannon Estuary and north to the head of Clonderlaw bay.

The original name of the parish, Kilfidane, is derived from a streamlet called Feadán in Irish. It runs near where the old church stood. There is a well dedicated to St Senán about 0.25 miles (0.40 km) south of the church.

== Facilities ==
The parish of Coolmeen is in the Roman Catholic Diocese of Killaloe. The parish has two churches, St Benedict's in Coolmeen and St Mary's in Cranny.
