= Inishcorker =

Island in County Clare, Ireland

Native name: Inis Corcair
- Location within island of Ireland

Geography
- Location: Shannon Estuary
- Coordinates: 52°40′05″N 9°05′20″W

Administration
- Ireland
- Province: Munster
- County: Clare

Demographics
- Population: 0 (2006)

Inishcorker (Gaeilge: Inis Corcair) is an uninhabited island in County Clare. Its name is derived from the Irish "inis", meaning island or river meadow.

== Demographics ==
Historical population

Year	Pop.	±%
1841	7	—
1851	8	+14.3%
1861	11	+37.5%
1871	5	−54.5%
1881	4	−20.0%
1891	6	+50.0%
1901	6	+0.0%
1911	3	−50.0%

Year	Pop.	±%
1926	4	+33.3%
1936	2	−50.0%
1946	2	+0.0%
1951	2	+0.0%
1956	1	−50.0%
1961	2	+100.0%
1966	0	−100.0%
1971	0	0.00%

Year	Pop.	±%
1979	0	0.00%
1981	0	0.00%
1986	0	0.00%
1991	0	0.00%
1996	0	0.00%
2002	0	0.00%
2006	0	0.00%

Source: Central Statistics Office. "CNA17: Population by Off Shore Island, Sex and Year". CSO.ie.
