= Inishmacowney =

Island in County Clare, Ireland

Native name: Inis Mhic Uaithne
- Location within island of Ireland

Geography
- Location: River Fergus
- Coordinates: 52°41′N 9°03′W
- Area: 0.9698 km^{2} (0.3744 sq mi)

Administration
- Ireland
- Province: Munster
- County: Clare

Demographics
- Population: 0

Inishmacowney (Gaeilge: Inis Mhic Uaithne), also known as Horse Island, is an uninhabited island and townland in the River Fergus and Kildysart parish in County Clare, Ireland. The island has an area of 0.9698 km^{2} (239 acres) and consists of mainly grassland. The island has been uninhabited since 1976, but boasted a population of 44 in 1911.

Historical population

| Year | Pop. | ±% |
|---|---|---|
| 1841 | 142 | — |
| 1851 | 91 | −35.9% |
| 1861 | 103 | +13.2% |
| 1871 | 95 | −7.8% |
| 1881 | 75 | −21.1% |
| 1891 | 30 | −60.0% |
| 1901 | 37 | +23.3% |
| 1911 | 44 | +18.9% |

| Year | Pop. | ±% |
|---|---|---|
| 1926 | 41 | −6.8% |
| 1936 | 28 | −31.7% |
| 1946 | 24 | −14.3% |
| 1951 | 22 | −8.3% |
| 1956 | 20 | −9.1% |
| 1961 | 18 | −10.0% |
| 1966 | 15 | −16.7% |
| 1971 | 18 | +20.0% |

| Year | Pop. | ±% |
|---|---|---|
| 1979 | 2 | −88.9% |
| 1981 | 0 | −100.0% |
| 1986 | 0 | 0.00% |
| 1991 | 0 | 0.00% |
| 1996 | 0 | 0.00% |
| 2002 | 0 | 0.00% |
| 2006 | 0 | 0.00% |

Source: Central Statistics Office. "CNA17: Population by Off Shore Island, Sex and Year". CSO.ie.
