= Lissycasey =

Village in County Clare, Ireland

Lissycasey Lios Uí Chathasaigh (Irish)
- Village
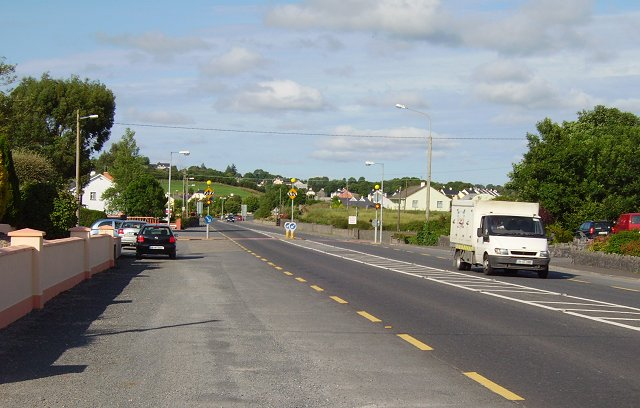
- Lissycasey is on the N68 road

- Location in Ireland
- Coordinates: 52°44′37″N 9°09′35″W
- Country: Ireland
- Province: Munster
- County: Clare

Population (2022)
  - Total: 390
- Time zone: UTC+0 (WET)
  - Summer (DST): UTC-1 (IST (WEST))
- Irish Grid Reference: R224669

Lissycasey (Irish: Lios Uí Chathasaigh, meaning 'ringfort of the Caseys') is a village in County Clare, Ireland. It forms one half of the parish of Clondegad-Kilchrist. The village straddles the N68 Ennis-Kilrush road for some 3.5 km. The area stretches east–west from Caherea to Crown and north–south from Frure North to Cloncolman. Lissycasey were Clare county champions in football in 2007 and won the Cusack Cup that year.

The Roman Catholic parish of Ballynacally (Clondegad) encompasses Ballynacally, Lissycasey and Ballycorick, and is part of the Diocese of Killaloe.

== Sword of O'Neill ==
In 1881, foreign publications reported that two men digging a drain near Lissycasey discovered an iron clasped chest laying on which was a large sword engraved with the name O'Neill. The men assumed it to be a coffin and reported the discovery to the police. The box was opened by the police and found it was full of gold coins of an ancient date.

== See also ==
- List of towns and villages in Ireland
