= Knock, County Clare =

Village in County Clare, Ireland

Knock An Cnoc
- Village
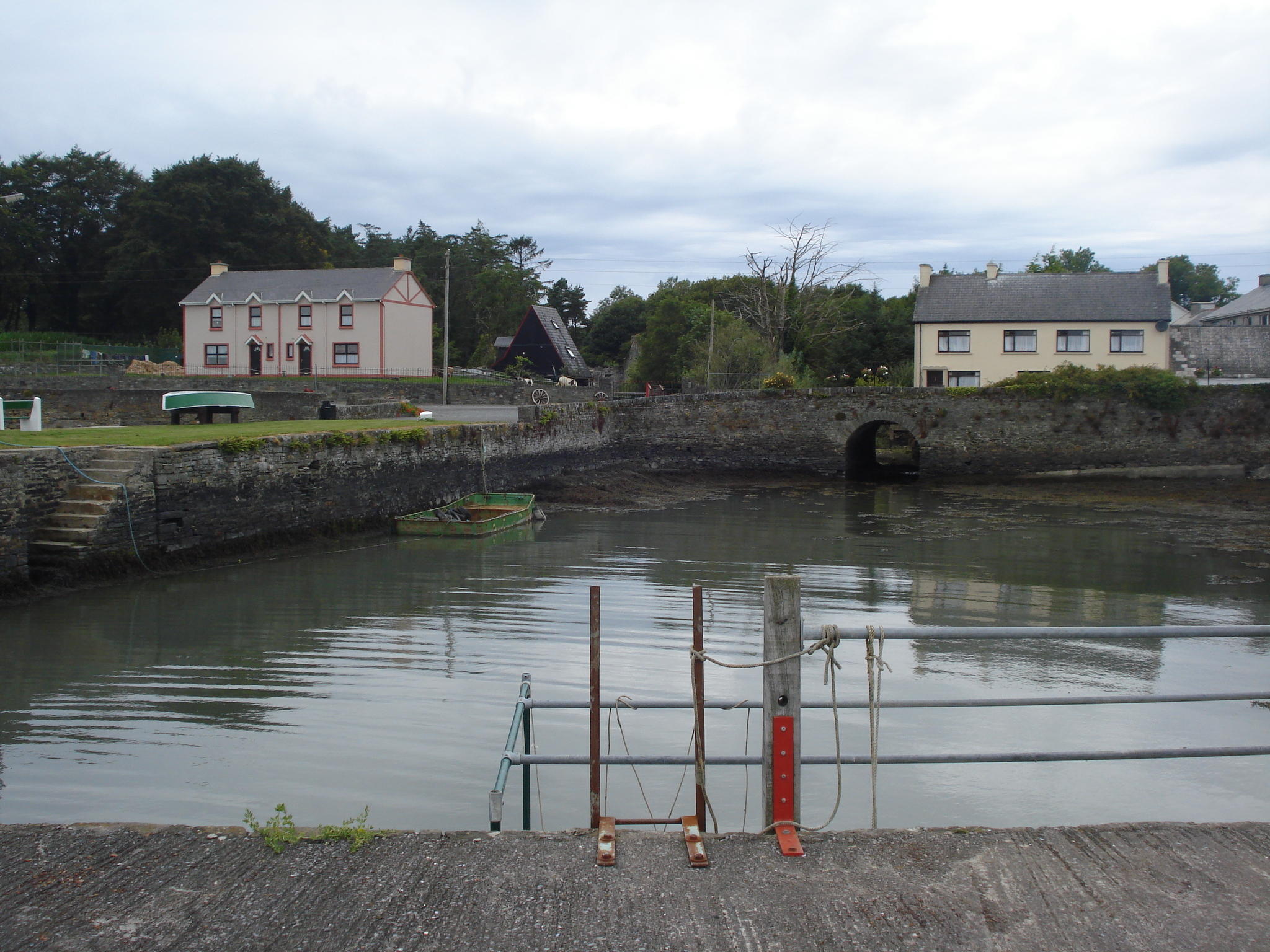
- The harbour at Knock

- Location in Ireland
- Coordinates: 52°37′N 9°14′W
- Country: Ireland
- Province: Munster
- County: County Clare
- Elevation: 5 m (16 ft)
- Time zone: UTC+0 (WET)
  - Summer (DST): UTC-1 (IST (WEST))
- Irish Grid Reference: R097537

Knock (Irish: An Cnoc, meaning 'the hill') is a village in County Clare, Ireland. It is located at the northern banks of Clonderalaw Bay which is connected to the River Shannon, and the R486 road passes through the village.

According to the geographer Samuel Lewis, the parish contained 180 inhabitants in 1837. The 2006 population census portrayed continuing depopulation, counting 228 inhabitants compared to 252 inhabitants in 2002.

The River Crompaun, which enters the Shannon near Knock, was the subject of questions in Dáil Éireann in 1949 when 14 sluices had broken down. The Commissioners of Public Works were not responsible for the repair according to minister Michael Donnelan. The fate of the sluices is unknown.

== Notable people ==
- Ellen Hanley – The unfortunate subject of the play The Colleen Bawn. After being murdered by her husband, she washed up nearby and was buried in Burrane Cemetery near Knock.

== See also ==
- List of towns and villages in Ireland
