= Labasheeda =

Village in County Clare, Ireland

Labasheeda Leaba Shíoda
- Village
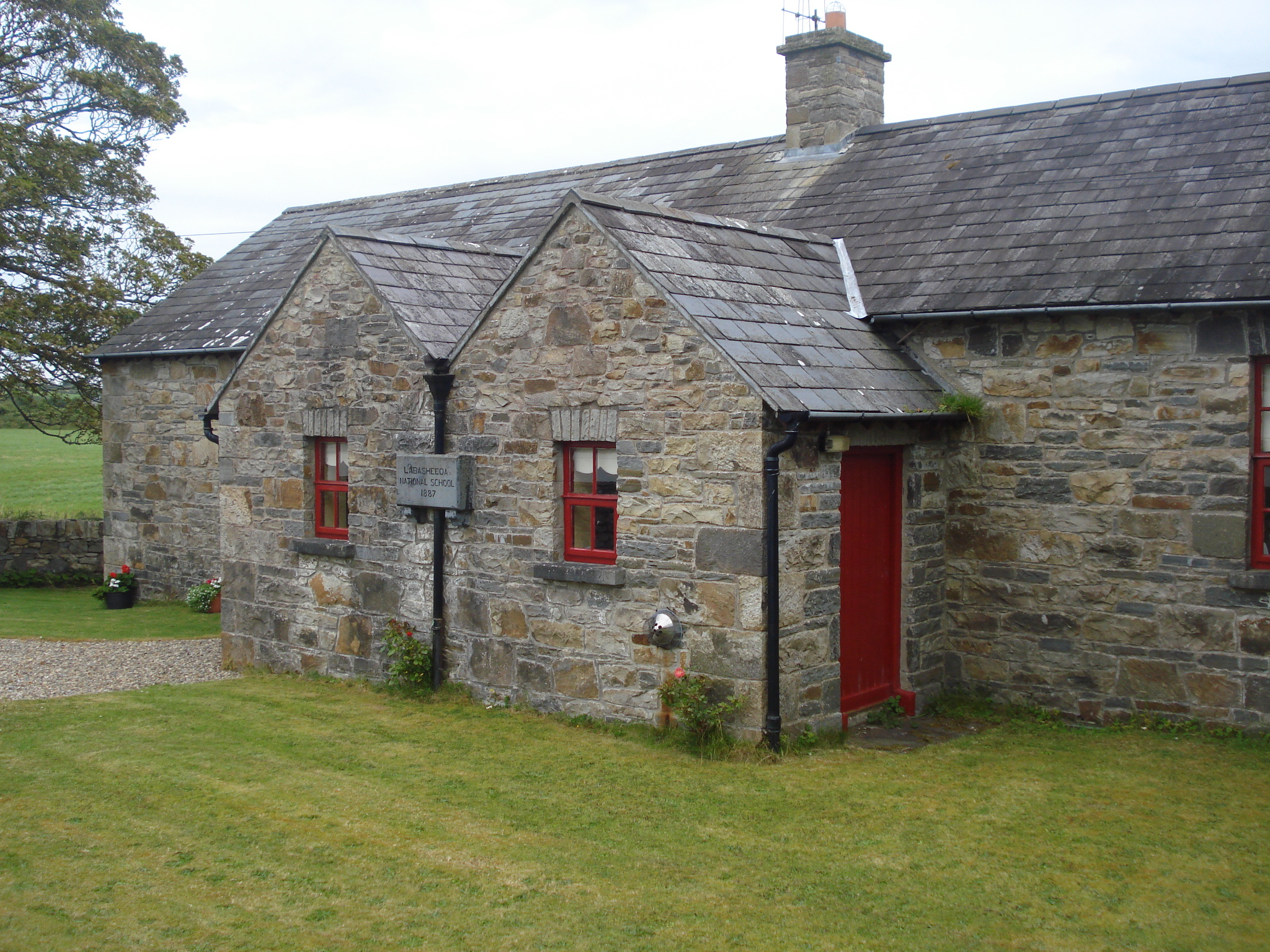
- The old National School of Labasheeda

- Location in Ireland
- Coordinates: 52°37′N 9°14′W
- Country: Ireland
- Province: Munster
- County: County Clare
- Elevation: 20 m (66 ft)
- Time zone: UTC+0 (WET)
  - Summer (DST): UTC-1 (IST (WEST))
- Irish Grid Reference: R156531

Labasheeda (Irish: Leaba Shíoda, meaning 'silken bed') is a village in the parish of Kilmurry McMahon in County Clare, Ireland. The village is set on a peninsula on the banks of the Shannon estuary.

== Location ==
The village lies in an indentation of the Shannon Estuary. It is in the civil parish of Killofin in the barony of Clonderalaw. Killofin today is part of the Catholic parish of Kilmurry McMahon, in the Roman Catholic Diocese of Killaloe. The church of St Ciarán's is in Labasheeda.

In 1841 there were 606 people in 108 houses.

== Sports ==
The local Gaelic Athletic Association team is called Shannon Gaels while the local athletics club is called St Marys AC.

== Notable people ==
- Dan Furey - dance teacher and fiddler
- Daniel Gallery - alderman Montreal, Liberal MP and Whip Canada

== See also ==
- List of towns and villages in Ireland
