= Kildysart =

Village in County Clare, Ireland

Kildysart Irish: Cill an Dísirt
- Village
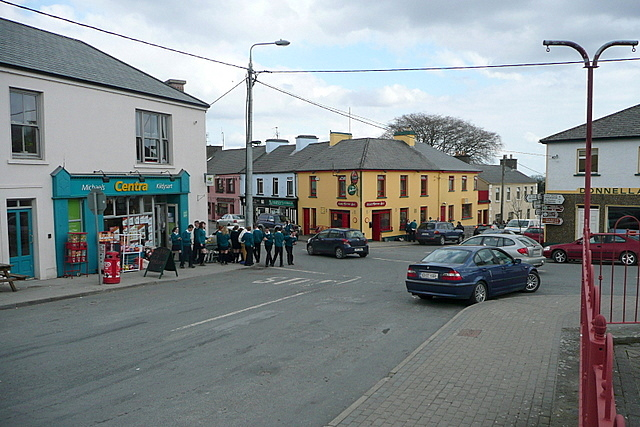

- Location in Ireland
- Coordinates: 52°40′25.94″N 9°6′28.22″W
- Country: Ireland
- Province: Munster
- County: County Clare

Population (2022)
  - Total: 436
- Irish Grid Reference: R252583
- Website: www.kildysart.com

Kildysart, officially Killadysert (from Irish Cill an Dísirt, meaning 'church of the wilderness'), is a large village in County Clare, Ireland and a civil and Roman Catholic parish by the same name that surrounds the village.

== Location ==
The parish lies on the east border of the barony of Clonderalaw. It is 7 by 4 miles (11.3 by 6.4 km) and covers 12,859 acres (5,204 ha). It includes islands in the Fergus and Shannon Estuary, land along the western seaboard of the Fergus estuary and moor-covered uplands. The main island is Canon; other islands are Inishmacowney, Inishloe, Coney and Inishtubrid. Inland are the lakes of Gortglass—depth between 2 and 16 meters deep.

The Catholic parish is part of the Roman Catholic Diocese of Killaloe. The village of Kildysart/Killadysert is on the north bank of the Shannon Estuary on the R473 coastal route between Ennis and Kilrush.

The parish contains the following townlands: Ballylea, Ballynacragga, Ballyvohane, Blean, Booltydoolan, Cahiracon, Canon Island, Cappanavarnoge, Cloonkett, Cloonsnaghta, Cloonulla, Coney Island, Cooga, Coolteengowan, Craghera, Crossderry, Crovraghan, Derrylea, Effernan, Glenconaun Beg, Glenconaun More, Gortnacurra, Gortnahaha, Gortnavreaghaun, Inishcorker, Inishloe, Inichmacowney, Inishtubbrid, Killadysert, Lackannashinnagh, Liscormick, Lisnafaha, Lissyvurriheen, Rusheen and Shannacool.

== History ==
A monastery is said to have been founded on Low Island by Saint Senan of Iniscattery, before Saint Patrick came into Munster. Saint Moronoc is said to have had a cell here at the time of Senan's death, called "the Penitentiary of Inisluaidhe". There were many Danish forts and tumuli in the parish. The Moland Report of 1703 said of "Kildizert" that it "has on it ye ruins of an old church and several cabins." The ruins of the old church still remained in the burial-ground near the shore as of 1837.

In 1831, the population was 4,501, and in 1841 it was 5,130 in 753 houses. In 1834, there were 4,802 Catholics and 32 Protestants. In 1837, the village contained about 60 houses, irregularly built. A steamboat passed daily on the way to or from Limerick. An application had also been made to the Board of Public Works to improve the Quay near Kildysart, from which pigs, corn, butter and agricultural produce were sent to Limerick in boats; and building material, groceries and other essentials were brought back in return.

== Today ==
Kildysart has two minimarkets, hardware shops, a post office, a mobile bank, pharmacy, clinic, veterinary clinic, credit union, garage, community centre, four pubs and the Quay Marina. It has the parish church, St Michael's and St John Bosco Community College. It also has a branch of Clare Libraries. The population in 2022 was 436 as of the 2022 census

Kildysart is known for its fishing, both in the estuary and in the local lakes. Gortglass, Clonshnacta and Effernan, close to the village, are trout fishing lakes only. Only members of the local angling club are allowed to fish in them. Visitors can charter a boat for fishing in the Shannon Estuary or for trips to the islands. The estuary holds fish such as conger, skate, dogfish, pollock, flounder, tope and Thorn Back Ray, all of which can also be caught off Cahercon Pier, which is open to the public and is about 1 mile (1.6 km) from Kildysart.

== See also ==
- List of towns and villages in Ireland
