= Kilmurry McMahon =

Civil parish, and Catholic parish, in County Clare, Ireland

- Parish
- Location within Ireland
- Coordinates: 52°39′11″N 9°17′41″W
- Country: Ireland
- Province: Munster
- County: County Clare
- Time zone: UTC+0 (WET)
  - Summer (DST): UTC-1 (IST (WEST))
- Irish Grid Reference: R258774

Kilmurry McMahon (Irish: Cill Mhuire Mhic Mhathuna), also called Kilmurry-Clonderalaw, is a civil parish in County Clare in Ireland. It is also a Catholic parish in the Diocese of Killaloe.

== Townlands ==
Townlands of the civil parish of Kilmurry-Clonderalaw are Ballycurraun, Binvoran, Bleanmore, Breaghva, Carrowbane, Carrowniska North, Carrowniska South, Cassarnagh, Clonderalaw, Cross Beg, Cross More, Derreen, Derrybrick, Derrynalecka, Drumdigus, Kilmore, Kilmurry East, Kilmurry West, Kinlea, Knock, Knockaderreen, Knocknahooan, Lisheenydeen, Prospect, Tullycreen Lower and Tullycreen Upper.

Townlands of the civil parish of Killofin are Ballina, Ballyartney, Ballygeery East, Ballygeery West, Bohyodaun, Cloonarass, Cloonkeery East, Cloonkeery West, Colmanstown, Cullenagh, Kilkerin, Killofin, Knockphutteen, Lakyle North, Lakyle South, Mount Shannon East, Mount Shannon West and Slievedooley.

== Location ==
The Catholic parish of Kilmurry McMahon / Labasheeda is bounded on the south by the Shannon Estuary and by the parishes of Kilmihil on the north, Killimer on the west and Coolmeen (Kilfidane) on the east. It is 30 kilometres (19 mi) west of Ennis. The name derives its name from the church dedicated to Our Lady. The suffix, McMahon, to distinguish it from other Kilmurrys in the county, came from the McMahon clan, who had their main residence at Clonderlaw Castle. The Catholic parish, in the Roman Catholic Diocese of Killaloe, combines the former parishes of Kilmurry McMahon and Killofin. The parish has two holy wells, Tullyrcrine well and Mountshannon well.

There are two villages in the parish, Labasheeda and Knock. The population has declined from 7,932 in 1831 to 650 in 2014.

== Education ==
There are two primary schools in the parish, Kilmurry McMahon National School and Labasheeda National School. In 2014, Tullycrine National School and Drumdigus National School amalgamated to form Kilmurry McMahon National School, which is located on the site of the old Drumdigus National School. Another primary school at Kilkerin closed in the middle of the last century and has since been demolished.

== Sport and leisure ==
Gaelic football is played in the parish by Shannon Gaels, with its football pitch located in Ballyguiry about 1 km from Clonderlaw Bay along the R473 Clarecastle-Kilrush road. The club has won the Clare Senior Football Championship three times in its history, most recently in 1971, as well as a number of underage titles.

St Mary's Athletic Club also uses this facility.

== Religion ==
There are two Roman Catholic churches in the parish. St. Ciarán's Church is located in the village of Labasheeda while St. Mary's Church is located in the townland of Drumdigus. The former church in the village of Labasheeda is now used as a Community Centre having been previously owned by Shannon Development. A Church of Ireland church was located in the graveyard at Kilmurry East but was demolished in 1965. There is also a graveyard in Kilofin, while there is a famine grave located in the townland of Carrowniska South. There is also a children's grave called Líos na Leanaí, in the townland of Tullycreen Lower, from an era when the doctrine of the Church forbade the burial of unbaptised children on consecrated ground.
