= Deer Island (Ireland) =

Island in Shannon Estuary in Ireland

Native name: Inis Mór
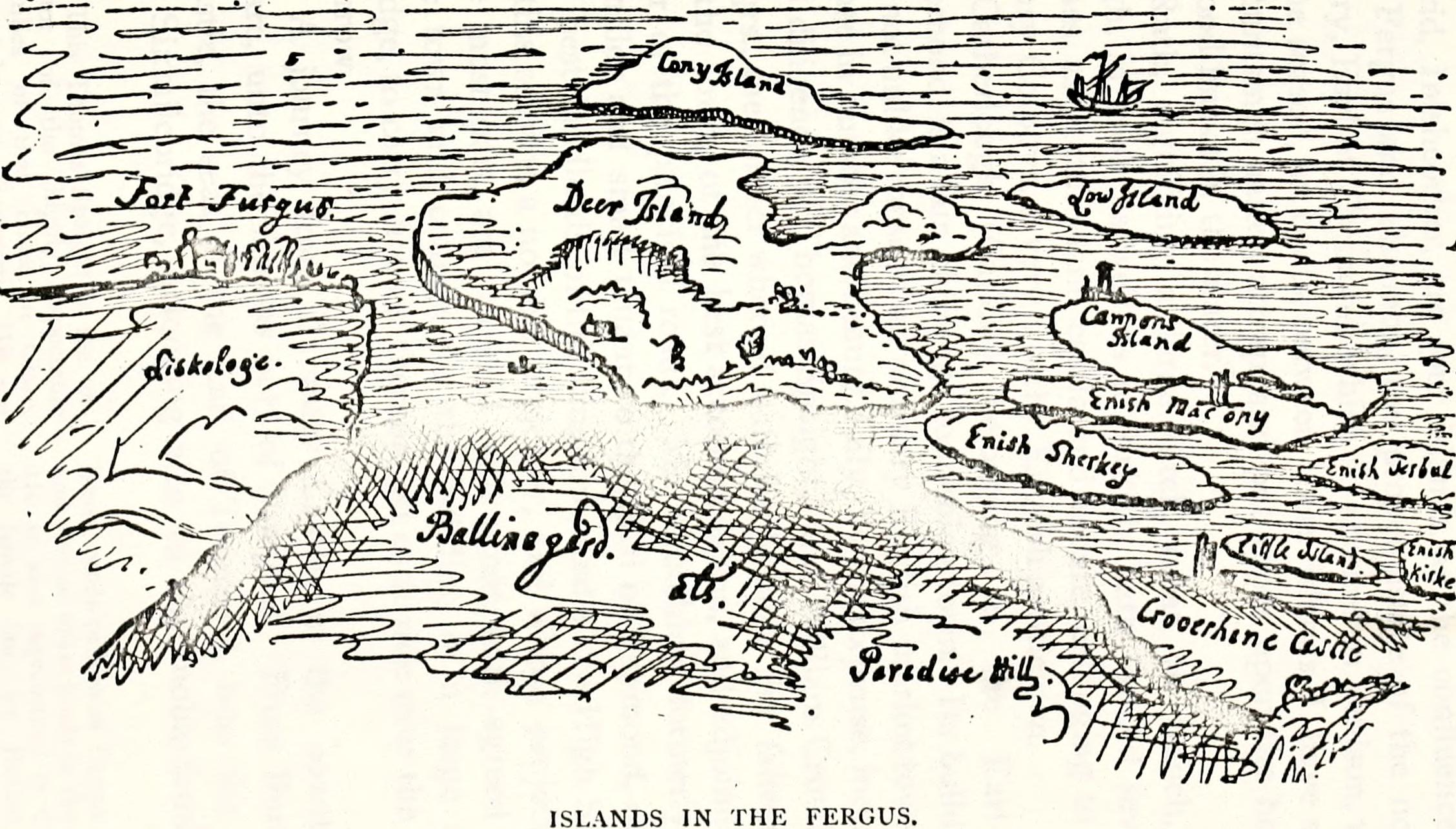
- Deer Island (center) and neighbouring islands map

- Location within island of Ireland

Geography
- Location: Shannon Estuary
- Coordinates: 52°42′50″N 9°02′10″W

Administration
- Ireland
- Province: Munster
- County: Clare

Demographics
- Population: 0

Deer Island or Inishmore (Irish: Inis Mór, meaning 'great island') is located in the Fergus Estuary in County Clare, Ireland.

== Location ==
According to Clare County Library, Deer Island, or Innismore, is situated near the western bank of the River Fergus about a quarter of a mile from the village of Ballynacally. In 1837 it was measured at 493 statute acres, making it the largest island in the Fergus Estuary.

The nearest point from the Irish mainland to Deer Island, is Rosscliff jetty, 300 meters away. The jetty was used to ferry people and animals to and from the Island.

== Population ==
Administratively it is part of the District Electoral Division of Ballynacally. Population in 1996 was 1 (unchanged since 1991). It was the only inhabited island in County Clare. The 1901 census showed 9 families living on the island. It has been uninhabited since 2004, when Briget Tuohy, the last resident died, though many families of former residents visit the island throughout the year.

=== Demographics ===
The table below reports data on Inishmore's population taken from Discover the Islands of Ireland (Alex Ritsema, Collins Press, 1999) and the Census of Ireland. Census data in Ireland before 1841 are not considered complete and/or reliable.

Historical population

Year	Pop.	±%
1841	133	—
1851	82	−38.3%
1861	71	−13.4%
1871	71	+0.0%
1881	72	+1.4%
1891	58	−19.4%
1901	51	−12.1%
1911	45	−11.8%

Year	Pop.	±%
1926	44	−2.2%
1936	32	−27.3%
1946	34	+6.2%
1951	24	−29.4%
1956	24	+0.0%
1961	20	−16.7%
1966	16	−20.0%
1971	15	−6.2%

Year	Pop.	±%
1979	3	−80.0%
1981	3	+0.0%
1986	2	−33.3%
1991	1	−50.0%
1996	1	+0.0%
2002	1	+0.0%
2006	0	−100.0%
2011	0	0.00%

Source: Central Statistics Office. "CNA17: Population by Off Shore Island, Sex and Year". CSO.ie.

== History and archaeology ==
In 1837 the island was nearly equally divided between pasture and tillage. It was the property of the Earl of Egremont and was also called Inchmore, or the "Great Island", being the largest of the Fergus islands. Samuel Lewis reported that "Flax was formerly cultivated here… but is now only partially grown". He also mentioned "some vestiges of an abbey still remaining, founded… at a very early period, by Saint Senan of Inniscattery, who appointed St. Liberius one of his disciples, to preside over it". The ruins of the old church, some cholera graves and a holy well called Tobar Breedia are still to be seen. Deer Island was once a deer park, enclosed by water, where the Earl of Thomond kept a live larder of venison.

== Nearby islands ==
Nearby islands include:

- Canon Island, anciently called Elanogannonoch, contains remains of a priory founded and built between the years 1166 and 1169 by Donald O'Brien, king of Limerick
- Coney Island, also Inishdadrom ('the island of the two backs'), of two ancient churches, in one of which St. Brendan of Kerry ministered
- Low Island on which is one of those cairns called 'Dhiarmuid and Graunia's bed,' remarkable in bardic tradition and folk-lore. The Celtic legend is, that Dhiarmunid, a young chieftain, fled with Graunia, the affianced wife of the aged Fionn mac Cumhaill, who were pursued by Finn and his warriors, sleeping each night in a different place under a stone structure hastily erected by Dhiarmuid.
