= Inishloe =

Island in County Clare, Ireland

Native name: Inis Lua
- Location within island of Ireland

Geography
- Location: River Fergus
- Coordinates: 52°40′37″N 9°01′12″W
- Area: 0.52 km^{2} (0.20 sq mi)

Administration
- Ireland
- Province: Munster
- County: Clare

Demographics
- Population: 0

Inishloe or Low Island (Gaeilge: Inis Lua) is an uninhabited island in the River Fergus and townland in the Kildysart parish of County Clare, Ireland.

== Geography ==
The island's surface area is 52.68 hectares (130 acres).

== Demographics ==
It has been uninhabited since 1976 however the 1901 census showed 43 inhabitants which reduced to 32 in 1911.

Historical population

| Year | Pop. | ±% |
|---|---|---|
| 1841 | 114 | — |
| 1851 | 93 | −18.4% |
| 1861 | 96 | +3.2% |
| 1871 | 91 | −5.2% |
| 1881 | 55 | −39.6% |
| 1891 | 43 | −21.8% |
| 1901 | 43 | +0.0% |
| 1911 | 32 | −25.6% |

| Year | Pop. | ±% |
|---|---|---|
| 1926 | 28 | −12.5% |
| 1936 | 23 | −17.9% |
| 1946 | 27 | +17.4% |
| 1951 | 14 | −48.1% |
| 1956 | 10 | −28.6% |
| 1961 | 9 | −10.0% |
| 1966 | 7 | −22.2% |
| 1971 | 3 | −57.1% |

| Year | Pop. | ±% |
|---|---|---|
| 1979 | 0 | −100.0% |
| 1981 | 0 | 0.00% |
| 1986 | 0 | 0.00% |
| 1991 | 0 | 0.00% |
| 1996 | 0 | 0.00% |
| 2002 | 0 | 0.00% |
| 2006 | 0 | 0.00% |
| 2011 | 0 | 0.00% |

Source: Central Statistics Office. "CNA17: Population by Off Shore Island, Sex and Year". CSO.ie.

The table reports data taken from Discover the Islands of Ireland (Alex Ritsema, Collins Press, 1999) and the Census of Ireland.
