= Canon Island =

Island in the River Shannon, Ireland

Native name: Oileán na gCanánach
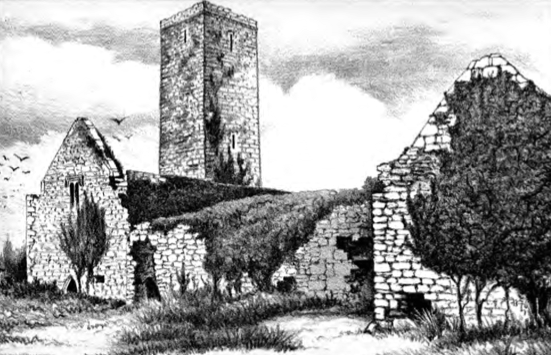

- Location within island of Ireland

Geography
- Location: Shannon Estuary
- Coordinates: 52°40′N 9°03′W

Administration
- Ireland
- Province: Munster
- County: Clare

Demographics
- Population: 0

Canon Island (Irish: Oileán na gCanánach) is an island and townland situated in the Shannon Estuary, in County Clare, Ireland. It is about 2.5 km (1.6 mi) east of the village of Kildysart and about 1.5 km (0.9 mi) from the shore on the mainland.

The island is home to the ruins of Canon Island Abbey, an Augustinian monastery built in the late 12th century.

== Population ==
Historical population

Year	Pop.	±%
1841	54	—
1851	37	−31.5%
1861	39	+5.4%
1871	39	+0.0%
1881	30	−23.1%
1891	24	−20.0%
1901	24	+0.0%
1911	20	−16.7%

Year	Pop.	±%
1926	18	−10.0%
1936	12	−33.3%
1946	9	−25.0%
1951	7	−22.2%
1956	6	−14.3%
1961	5	−16.7%
1966	4	−20.0%
1971	5	+25.0%

Year	Pop.	±%
1979	0	−100.0%
1981	0	0.00%
1986	0	0.00%
1991	0	0.00%
1996	0	0.00%
2002	0	0.00%
2006	0	0.00%

Source:s Central Statistics Office. "CNA17: Population by Off Shore Island, Sex and Year". CSO.ie.
