= River Fergus =

Tributary of the Shannon in western Ireland

Coordinates: 52°42′N 9°00′W

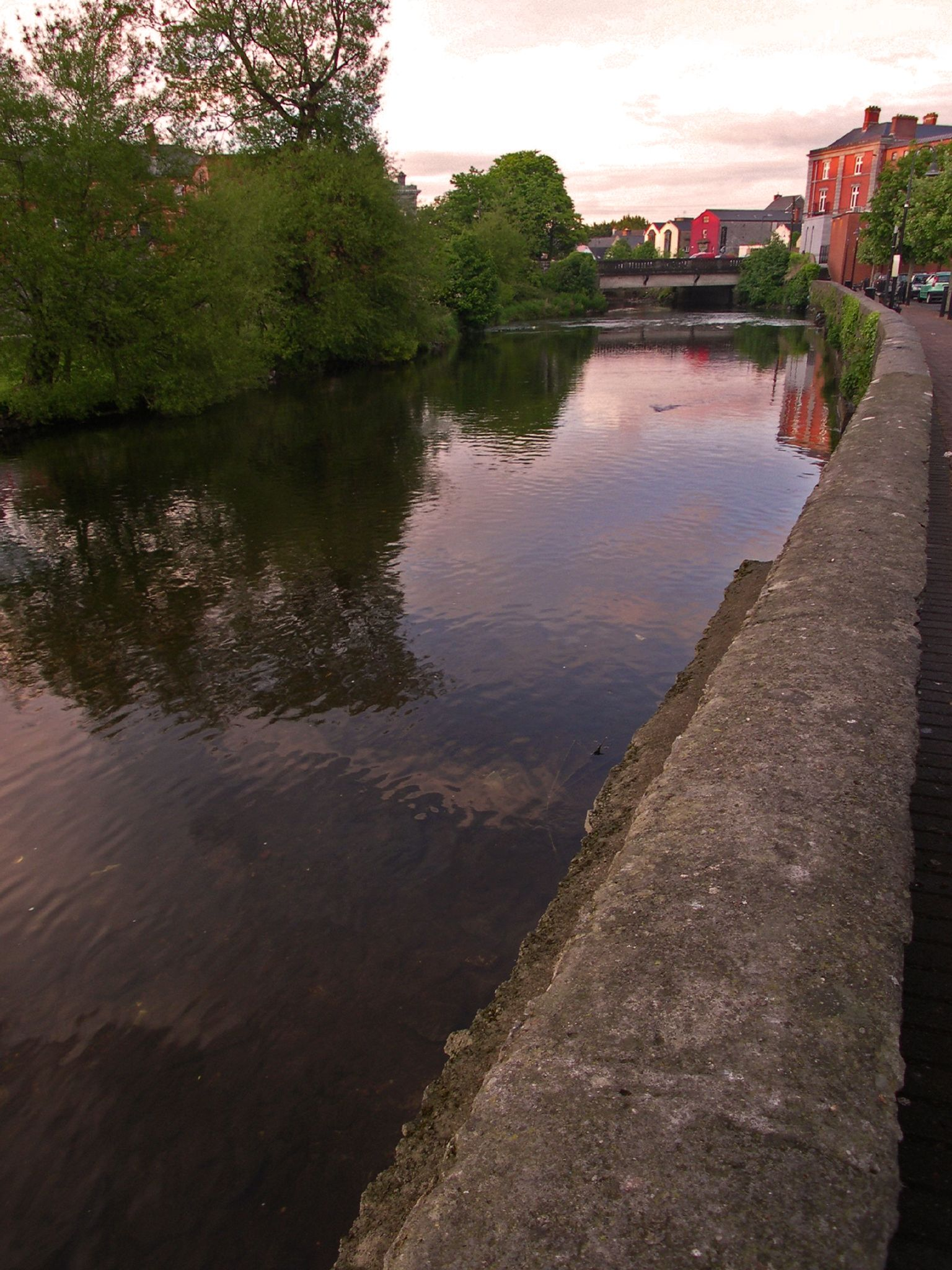
- The river at Ennis
- Native name: An Forghas (Irish)

Physical characteristics
- Source
  - location: Lough Fergus, Clare
  - elevation: 86 m (282 ft)
- Mouth
  - location: Shannon Estuary at Ennis
- Length: 59 km (37 mi)
- Basin size: 1,041 km^{2} (402 sq mi)
- Discharge
  - average: 25.7 m^{3}/s (910 cu ft/s)

The River Fergus (Irish: An Forghas) is a river within the Shannon River Basin which flows in County Clare, Ireland. The river begins at Lough Fergus in north Clare and flows into the Shannon Estuary. The source is at Lough Fergus in the townland of Kilmore North.

At Knockroe, the Fergus is joined by a tributary stream called the Clooneen River. It flows underground for about a kilometre in Cahermacon, near Kilnaboy. The river then flows through Lough Inchiquin. Just after this lake, a tributary which has its source at Loughnagowan joins the Fergus. The river then flows along by the village of Corofin. After Corofin, the river flows through Lough Atedaun, Ballyteige Lough, Dromore Lough and Ballyallia Lake. The river then flows through the town of Ennis, where it is crossed by six road bridges, a pedestrian bridge and a railway bridge. There is also a small branch which splits off just north of Ennis and rejoins the main flow to the east of the town. Another tributary, the Inch River or Claureen River, also joins at Ennis. The Fergus then flows through the village of Clarecastle, where there was a port in former times. After Clarecastle, the river widens into an estuary which then joins the Shannon Estuary. There are several islands in the Fergus Estuary, including Deer Island, Coney Island, Trummer, Feenish, Inishmacowney, Canon Island and Inishloe. Some of these islands were once inhabited, and there were schools on Coney Island and Inishloe.

The River Fergus is noted for its trout and salmon fishing. A water-powered flour mill was located at Clifden, Corofin, just after the river exits Lough Inchiquin. Some of the ruins of the mill still exist. Another water mill was located in Ennis, and its mill wheel has been restored.

The River Fergus has an average discharge of 25.7 m^{3}/s.

== Name ==
The river's name is recorded in old Irish manuscripts as Forgas and Forgus. A possible derivation is from Old Irish for- ("on, upon") and gas, "stripling, twig, scion", with the Fergus seen as a twig or small branch off of the much larger River Shannon.

== Settlements ==
Settlements along the river include Corofin, Ennis and Clarecastle.

== See also ==
- Rivers of Ireland
- River Shannon
- Shannon River Basin
