= Clare county football team =

Gaelic football team

Clare
- Sport: Football
- Irish: An Clár
- Nickname(s): Banner men
- County board: Clare GAA
- Manager: Paul Madden
- Captain: Cillian Rouine (Ennistymon)
- Home venue(s): Cusack Park, Ennis

Recent competitive record
- Current All-Ireland status: Munster (SF) in 2025
- Last championship title: None
- Current NFL Division: 3 (3rd in 2025)
- Last league title: None
First colours

The Clare county football team represents Clare in men's Gaelic football and is governed by Clare GAA, the county board of the Gaelic Athletic Association. The team competes in the three major annual inter-county competitions; the All-Ireland Senior Football Championship, the Munster Senior Football Championship and the National Football League.

Clare's home ground is Cusack Park, Ennis. The team's manager is Paul Madden.

The team last won the Munster Senior Championship in 1992, but has never won the All-Ireland Senior Championship or the National League.

== History ==
Clare has won two Munster Senior Football Championship (SFC) titles. The county competes in Division 2 of the National Football League.

=== 1917: First Munster SFC title and only All-Ireland SFC final ===
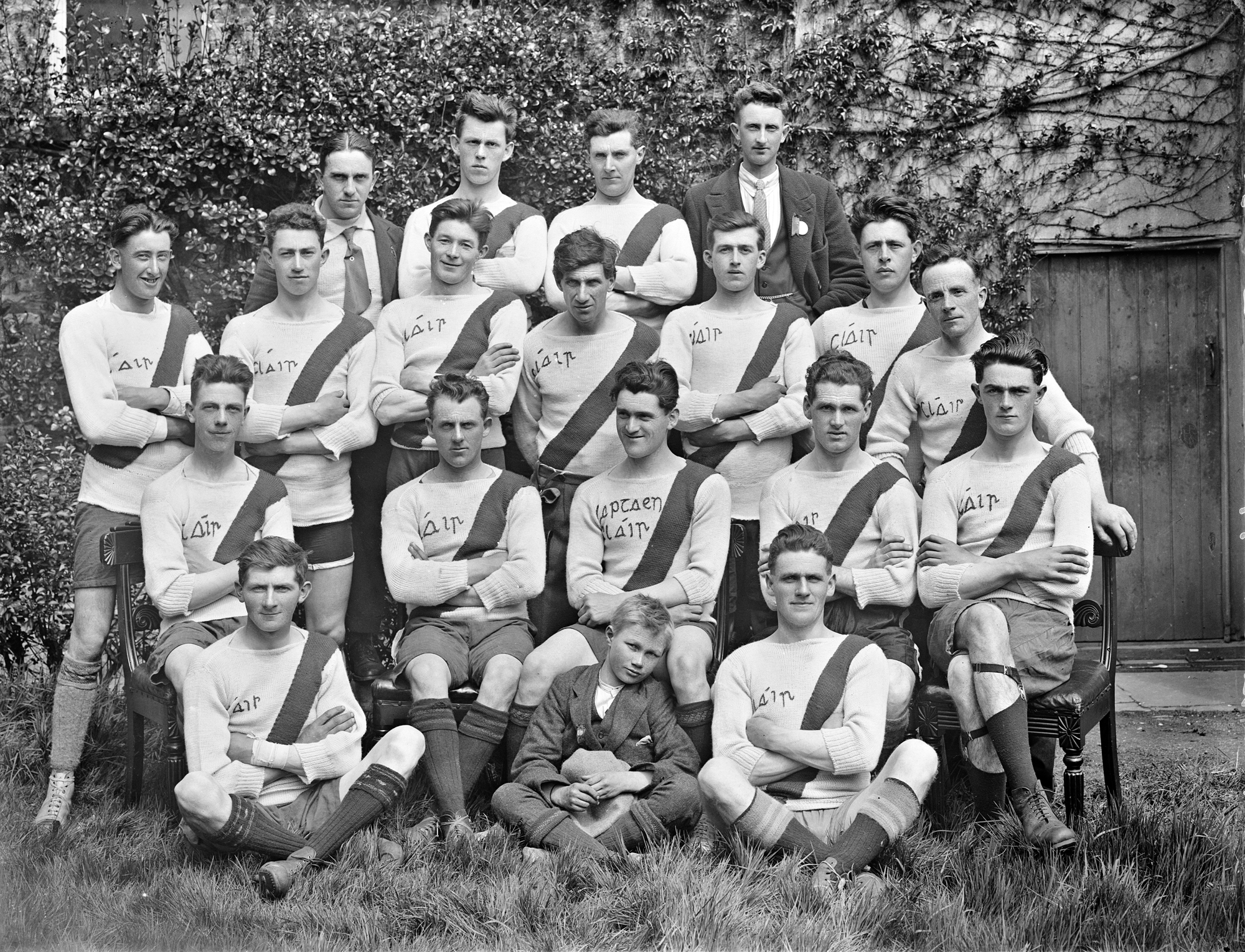
Clare junior football team, 1925

Clare won its first Munster SFC in 1917, defeating Cork on a scoreline of 5–4 to 0–1. This was after losing deciders in 1912 and 1915 to Kerry and in 1916 to Cork. Clare then faced Galway in the 1917 All-Ireland Senior Football Championship (SFC) semi-final and won by a scoreline of 2–1 to 0–5. However, in the 1917 All-Ireland Senior Football Championship final, Clare narrowly lost to Wexford by a scoreline of 0–9 to 0–5. Wexford had won the All-Ireland SFC in 1915 and 1916 and would complete a four-in-a-row in 1918.

=== 1954: Not part of the Munster championship ===
Due to 1 sided defeat to Kerry by 6–10 to 0–2 in Ennis in the 1953 Munster SFC semi-final, it was decided that Clare would not be part the 1954 championship.

=== 1979: "Milltown Massacre" ===
A low point for the county team was the so-called "Milltown Massacre" in 1979. During a game played in Milltown Malbay, Clare lost to Kerry by a scoreline of 1–9 to 9–21, a difference of 35 points. Tommy Tubridy, the father of David, played in that game.

=== 1990–1994: John Maughan and second Munster SFC title ===
Clare football's greatest day since 1917 arrived in 1992 when, under the stewardship of Mayo native John Maughan, the county won its second Munster SFC by defeating Kerry in the final at the Gaelic Grounds, Limerick, by a scoreline of 2–10 to 0–12. This victory was aided in no small part by two second half goals from Colm Clancy and Martin Daly. This victory was also historic in that it is the only year from 1936 to 2020 (when Tipperary won) that neither Kerry nor Cork won the Munster SFC. Clare's luck would run out however, and in the 1992 All-Ireland SFC semi-final, the team lost to Dublin by a scoreline of 3–14 to 2–12. Full back on the team of 1992 was Seamus Clancy, brother of full-forward Colm, and he was rewarded for his performances in the 1992 championship with a place on the All-Star team of that year.

=== 2013–2023: Colm Collins ===
Collins led Clare from Division 4 to Division 2 of the National Football League.

Clare qualified for a 2016 All-Ireland SFC quarter-final by defeating Roscommon.

The team qualified for another All-Ireland quarter-final in 2022 after beating Roscommon again; they lost to Derry in the quarters.

Collins left.

=== 2023–present: After Collins ===
Kerryman Mark Fitzgerald was appointed in September 2023. Fitzgerald guided Clare to a third-place finish in the NFL, before leading the team to the 2024 Munster SFC final. He stepped down on 13 September 2024 to take up a role with the Kerry under-20 football team. Peter Keane, former Kerry manager and Fitzgerald's fellow Kerryman, replaced him. After one campaign, Keane departed and was replaced by Paul Madden of Éire Óg.

== Support ==
Clare has its own supporters' club, which is separate from the supporters' club of the county hurling team.

== Panel ==
Team as per Clare vs Kerry in the 2025 Munster Senior Football Final, 4 May 2025

No.	Player	Position	Club
1	Eamon Tubridy	Goalkeeper	Doonbeg
2	Manus Doherty	Right corner-back	Éire Óg, Ennis
3	Cillian Brennan (c)	Full-back	Clondegad
4	Ronan Lanigan	Left corner-back	Éire Óg, Ennis
5	Cillian Rouine	Right half-back	Ennistymon
6	Ikem Ugweuru	Centre-back	Éire Óg, Ennis
7	Alan Sweeney	Left half-back	St Breckan's, Lisdoonvarna
8	Brian McNamara	Midfield	Cooraclare
9	Daniel Walsh	Midfield	Kilmurry-Ibrickane
10	Aaron Griffin	Right half-forward	Lissycasey
11	Emmet McMahon	Centre-forward	Kildysart
12	Dermot Coughlan	Left half-forward	Kilmurry-Ibrickane
13	Keelan Sexton	Right corner-forward	Na Fianna
14	Eoin Cleary	Full-forward	St. Joseph's, Miltown Malbay
15	Mark McInerney	Left cornerforward	Éire Óg, Ennis

No.	Player	Position	Club
16	Tristan O'Callaghan	Substitute	St Breckan's, Lisdoonvarna
17	Fionn Kelleher	Substitute	St Joseph's Doora-Barefield
18	Conor Meany	Substitute	Lissycasey
19	Shane Griffin	Substitute	Lissycasey
20	Gavan Murray	Substitute	Éire Óg, Ennis
21	Darragh Burns	Substitute	Doonbeg
22	Rory McMahon	Substitute	Kildysart
23	Evan Cahill	Substitute	Kilmurry-Ibrickane
24	Diarmuid O'Donnell	Substitute	Kildysart
25	Cormac Murray	Substitute	St. Joseph's, Miltown Malbay
26	Darren Nagle	Substitute	Liscannor

== Management team ==
- Manager: Paul Madden
- Coach: Kieran Murphy
- Selectors: Shane Daniels, Ger Quinlan
- Strength and conditioning coach: Antoine Mobian
- Goalkeeping coach: James Hanrahan (appointed January 2025)

== Managerial history ==
Clare have a history of appointing "foreign" managers, with John Maughan, from Mayo, proving to be the most successful; Maughan led Clare to the 1992 Munster SFC (a first in 75 years). Other outsiders to manage Clare include Frank Doherty (Galway) and the Kerrymen Donie Buckley (who managed jointly with Michael Brennan from Galway), John Kennedy, John O'Keeffe, Mick O'Dwyer and Páidí Ó Sé. However, Colm Collins (from Clare GAA club Cratloe) began managing the team in 2013 and lasted so long that RTÉ called him "an icon of stability" in 2022, in contrast to less successful managerial appointments elsewhere. Following the departure of Collins, Clare returned to appointing outside managers: Kerryman Mark Fitzgerald was followed by Kerryman Peter Keane.

Dates	Name	Origin	Provincial titles	National titles	Championship record
1990–1994	John Maughan	Crossmolina (Mayo)	1992 McGrath Cup; 1992 Munster Senior Football Championship; 1994 McGrath Cup	1991 All-Ireland Senior B Football Championship; 1992 NFL Division 2	P6; W2 D0 L4
1994–1998	John O'Keeffe	Austin Stacks (Kerry)	1995 McGrath Cup; 1997 McGrath Cup	1995 NFL Division 2	P5; W1 D1 L3
1998–2000	Tommy Curtin	St. Breckan's, Lisdoonvarna	2000 McGrath Cup	—N/a	P4; W2 D0 L2
2000–2002	Pat Begley	Ennistymon	2000 McGrath Cup	—N/a	P5; W2 D0 L3
2002–2005	John Kennedy	Ballylongford (Kerry)	2002 McGrath Cup	2004 Tommy Murphy Cup	P12; W5 D1 L6
2005–2006	Donie Buckley	Castleisland (Kerry)	—N/a	—N/a	P8; W3 D0 L5
2005–2006	Michael Brennan	St. Grellan's (Galway)	—N/a	—N/a	P8; W3 D0 L5
2006–2007	Páidí Ó Sé	An Ghaeltacht (Kerry)	—N/a	—N/a	P3; W1 D0 L2
2007–2009	Frank Doherty	Caltra (Galway)	2008 McGrath Cup	—N/a	P5; W1 D0 L4
2009–2012	Micheál McDermott	Kilmurry-Ibrickane	—N/a	—N/a	P7; W1 D0 L6
2012–2013	Mick O'Dwyer	Waterville (Kerry)	—N/a	—N/a	P2; W0 D0 L2
2013–2023	Colm Collins	Cratloe	2019 McGrath Cup	2016 NFL Division 3	P33; W16 D1 L16 as of 8 November 2022
2023–2024	Mark Fitzgerald	Kerins O'Rahilly's (Kerry)	—N/a	—N/a	P5; W1 D0 L4
2024–	Peter Keane	St Mary's (Kerry)			

== Players ==
=== Notable players ===
- Gary Brennan
- Gordon Kelly

=== Records ===
- David Tubridy became top scorer in National Football League history against Cork in May 2021, his total score in the competition after this game (22–412, i.e. 478 points) causing him to overtake the record of Mickey Kearins.

=== All Stars ===
Clare has one All Star.

All Star winners
Awards	Players
1	Seamus Clancy (1992)

== Competitive record ==
All-Ireland SFC final record

List of appearances
#	Date	Venue	Opponent	Result	W/L/D
1	9 December 1917	Croke Park, Dublin	Wexford	0–5 : 0–9	L

Clare won an All-Ireland Senior B Football Championship in 1991, with John Maughan as manager.

- 1 James Hanrahan
- 2 Seamus Clancy
- 3 Gerry Kelly
- 4 Kieran O'Mahony
- 5 M. Roughan
- 6 Joe Joe Rouine
- 7 C. O'Neill
- 8 B. Rouine
- 9 Aidan Moloney
- 10 Noel Roche
- 11 L. Conneally
- 12 Gerry Killeen
- 13 D. Coughlan
- 14 M. Flynn
- 15 D. Keane

== Honours ==
=== National ===
- All-Ireland Senior Football Championship
  - (silver) Runners-up (1): 1917
- All-Ireland Senior B Football Championship
  - (gold) Winners (2): 1991
  - (silver) Runners-up (1): 1997
- Tommy Murphy Cup
  - (gold) Winners (1): 2004
- National Football League Division 2
  - (gold) Winners (2): 1992, 1995
- National Football League Division 3
  - (gold) Winners (2): 1987, 2016
- National Football League Division 4
  - (gold) Winners (1): 1982
- All-Ireland Minor Football Championship
  - (gold) Winners (1): 1929
- McGrath Cup

=== Provincial ===
- Munster Senior Football Championship
  - (gold) Winners (2): 1917, 1992
  - (silver) Runners-up (15): 1912, 1915, 1916, 1919, 1925, 1929, 1936, 1937, 1941, 1949, 1997, 2012, 2023, 2024, 2025
- McGrath Cup
  - (gold) Winners (13): 1982, 1983, 1984, 1986, 1990, 1991, 1994, 1995, 1997, 2000, 2002, 2008, 2019
- Munster Football League
  - (gold) Winners (1): 1933–34
- Munster Junior Football Championship
  - (gold) Winners (1): 1925
- Munster Minor Football Championship
  - (gold) Winners (3): 1929, 1930, 1953

== Minor team ==
Clare have won one All-Ireland and three Munster titles at minor level. They won the first of their three Munster Minor Football Championships defeating Waterford in 1929. Clare then proceeded to qualify for the inaugural All-Ireland Minor Football Final. In the final they faced Longford and prevailed by 5–03 to 3-05, to crown Clare All-Ireland Minor Champions. Clare defeated Tipperary in the 1930 Munster final to retain their provincial crown. The Banner County had to wait until 1953 for another Munster title. On this occasion Clare defeated Cork in the decider.

=== Competitive record ===
All-Ireland Minor Football Championship final appearances

List of appearances
#	Date	Venue	Opponent	Result	W/L/D
1	22 September 1929	Croke Park, Dublin	Longford	5–3 : 3–5	W
2	27 September 1953	Croke Park, Dublin	Mayo	1–6 : 2–11	L
