= 2023 Clare Senior Football Championship =

Annual gaelic football competition season

Jack Daly Cup 2023
- League: Clare GAA
- Sport: Gaelic Football
- Duration: 4 August - 15 October 2023
- Number of teams: 12
- Sponsor: TUS Midlands Midwest

Changes From 2022
- Promoted: Kildysart
- Relegated: Kilmihil

Changes For 2024
- Promoted: Kilmihil
- Relegated: Clondegad

County Championship
- Winners: Cratloe (3rd Title)
- Runners-up: St. Breckan's, Lisdoonvarna

The 2023 TUS Clare Senior Football Championship was the 128th staging of the Clare Senior Football Championship since its establishment by the Clare County Board in 1887.

The 2022 champions, and holders of the Jack Daly Cup were Éire Óg, Ennis, who successfully defended their 2021 crown, to win back-to-back titles and their twentieth overall. They defeated Ennistymon by 0–09 to 0–06 in Cusack Park, Ennis in the county final.

The draws for the 2023 Clare club championships took place on 14 June 2023.

== Senior Championship Fixtures ==
=== Group stage ===
- Three groups of four.
- 2022 semi-finalists are seeded and kept separate.
  - As there will be two 2022 semi-finalists in Group A, there will be an extra quarter-final place available.
  - A draw between the three second-placed teams in Groups A-C will determine the fourth seeded quarter-finalist.
- Each team plays all the other teams in their group once. Two points are awarded for a win and one for a draw.
  - The top three teams from Group A and the top two teams from Groups B and C advance to Quarter-Finals
  - The third-placed teams from Groups B and C advance to Preliminary Quarter-Final
  - The three bottom-placed teams in each group contest Relegation Playoffs

==== Group A ====
Quarter-Final, Seeded Quarter-Final, Unseeded Relegation Playoff

Team	Pld	W	D	L	F	A	Diff	Pts
Kilmurry-Ibrickane	3	3	0	0	53	34	+19	6
St. Breckan's, Lisdoonvarna	3	2	0	1	45	33	+12	4
St. Joseph's, Doora-Barefield	3	1	0	2	34	47	-13	2
Corofin	3	0	0	3	28	46	-18	0

4 August 2023 Round 1	Kilmurry-Ibrickane	2-10 - 2-09	St. Breckan's, Lisdoonvarna	Cusack Park, Ennis

5 August 2023 Round 1	Corofin	0-12 - 1-11	Doora-Barefield	Shannon

19 August 2023 Round 2	Corofin	0-07 - 3-11	Kilmurry-Ibrickane	Lissycasey

19 August 2023 Round 2	Doora-Barefield	0-08 - 1-15	St. Breckan's, Lisdoonvarna	Páirc Finne, Corofin

2 September 2023 Round 3	Corofin	1-06 - 2-06	St. Breckan's, Lisdoonvarna	Cusack Park, Ennis

2 September 2023 Round 3	Doora-Barefield	0-12 - 0-17	Kilmurry-Ibrickane	Kilmihil

==== Group B ====
Quarter-Final, Seeded Quarter-Final, Unseeded Premliminary Quarter-Final Relegation Playoff

Team	Pld	W	D	L	F	A	Diff	Pts
Éire Óg, Ennis	3	3	0	0	45	20	+25	6
St. Joseph's, Miltown Malbay	3	2	0	1	39	42	-3	4
Doonbeg	3	0	1	2	34	43	-9	1
Clondegad	2	0	1	2	34	47	-13	1

4 August 2023 Round 1	Doonbeg	0-14 - 1-14	Miltown Malbay	Cooraclare

5 August 2023 Round 1	Clondegad	0-07 - 1-15	Éire Óg, Ennis	Cusack Park, Ennis

20 August 2023 Round 2	Clondegad	2-09 - 1-12	Doonbeg	Cooraclare

20 August 2023 Round 2	Éire Óg, Ennis	1-13 - 0-08	Miltown Malbay	Cooraclare

3 September 2023 Round 3	Clondegad	1-09 - 1-11	Miltown Malbay	Cusack Park, Ennis

3 September 2023 Round 3	Doonbeg	0-05 - 0-11	Éire Óg, Ennis	Lissycasey

==== Group C ====
Quarter-Final, Seeded Quarter-Final, Unseeded Premliminary Quarter-Final Relegation Playoff

Team	Pld	W	D	L	F	A	Diff	Pts
Kildysart	3	2	0	1	42	41	+1	4
Cratloe	3	2	0	1	46	41	+5	4
Lissycasey	3	1	0	2	31	32	-1	2
Ennistymon	3	1	0	2	34	39	-5	2

4 August 2023 Round 1	Ennistymon	2-10 - 0-09	Kildysart	Páirc Finne, Corofin

5 August 2023 Round 1	Cratloe	0-12 - 1-07	Lissycasey	Clarecastle

18 August 2023 Round 2	Ennistymon	0-07 - 0-13	Lissycasey	Cusack Park, Ennis

19 August 2023 Round 2	Cratloe	1-14 - 2-14	Kildysart	Cusack Park, Ennis

2 September 2023 Round 3	Cratloe	2-11 - 2-05	Ennistymon	Gurteen

2 September 2023 Round 3	Kildysart	0-13 - 0-08	Lissycasey	Clarecastle

=== Preliminary Quarter-Final ===
- Played by two third-placed teams from Groups B and C

10 Sept. 2023 Preliminary Quarter-Final	Doonbeg	2-06 - 3-13	Lissycasey	Cusack Park, Ennis

=== Quarter-finals ===
- Played by top two placed teams from Groups A-C, third-placed team from Group A, and winners of Preliminary Quarter-Final

16 Sept. 2023 Quarter-Final	Cratloe	1-07 - 0-09	Kilmurry-Ibrickane	Cusack Park, Ennis

16 Sept. 2023 Quarter-Final	Doora-Barefield	1-11 - 0-15 (AET)	Éire Óg, Ennis	Cusack Park, Ennis

17 Sept. 2023 Quarter-Final	Kildysart	0-08 - 1-08	Miltown Malbay	Cusack Park, Ennis

17 Sept. 2023 Quarter-Final	Lissycasey	0-05 - 1-09	St. Breckan's, Lisdoonvarna	Cusack Park, Ennis

=== Semi-finals ===
30 Sept. 2023 Semi-Final	Miltown Malbay	0-14 - 1-12 (AET)	St. Breckan's, Lisdoonvarna	Cusack Park, Ennis

1 October 2023 Semi-Final	Cratloe	1-17 - 1-17 (AET); Cratloe won 4-2 on penalties	Éire Óg, Ennis	Cusack Park, Ennis

== County Final ==
15 October 2023 Final	Cratloe	1-10 - 1-08	St. Breckan's, Lisdoonvarna	Cusack Park, Ennis
15:00	Mike Brennan (0-01), Diarmuid Ryan (0-01), Tommy Rooney (0-01), Rian Considine (0-01), Cathal McInerney (1-06, 0-03f),	Report	Paudie Kelly (0-01, 0-01’45), Jamie Stack (0-05, 0-02f), Joe McGann (1-02),	Attendance: 4,554; Referee: Niall Quinn (St Joseph’s Miltown)

Cratloe	St. Breckan's, Lisdoonvarna

== Other Fixtures ==
=== Relegation Playoffs ===
- Played by the three bottom-placed teams from Groups A-C
  - Loser of Playoff 2 relegated to Intermediate for 2023

16 September 2023 Playoff 1	Corofin	0-09 - 1-08	Ennistymon	Lissycasey

1 October 2023 Playoff 2	Clondegad	0-10 - 0-11 (AET)	Corofin	Clarecastle
