= 1997 All-Ireland Senior B Football Championship =

Annual Gaelic football competition

Championship details

Champions
- Winning team: Louth (1st win)
- Captain: Gareth O'Neill
- Manager: Paddy Clarke

Finalists
- Runners-Up: Clare
- Captain: Barry Keating
- Manager: John O'Keeffe

The 1997 All-Ireland Senior B Football Championship was the eighth edition of the All-Ireland Senior B Football Championship, a Gaelic football competition introduced by the Gaelic Athletic Association (GAA) in 1990.

The competition ended in victory for Louth, who defeated Clare by three points in the final at Ballinasloe.

== Format ==
The championship began in September and was played on a straight knockout open-draw basis, with extra-time playable if teams finished level at the end of normal time. Twelve counties entered the competition, with Monaghan, Tipperary, Antrim and Roscommon each receiving a bye into the quarter-finals.

== Results ==
=== 1st Round ===
20 September	Carlow	0-13 – 0-07	Limerick	Dr Cullen Park
				Referee: T. O'Rourke (Kildare)

20 September	Clare	1-14 – 0-04	Longford	Cusack Park
				Referee: G. Hough (Limerick)

20 September	Louth	4-14 – 1-09	Sligo	St Brigid's Park
				Referee: B. Gorman (Armagh)

21 September	Wexford	1-13 – 0-12	Waterford	Stradbally
				Referee: Michael Collins (Cork)

=== Quarter-Finals ===
4 October	Louth	3-12 – 1-14	Antrim	Casement Park
				Referee: M. McBrien (Fermanagh)

4 October	Monaghan	0-20 – 1-09	Tipperary	Castleblayney
				Referee: J. Harlin (Meath)

4 October	Clare	1-23 – 2-14 *	Wexford	New Ross
				Referee: T. Meehan (Tipperary)

n/a	Carlow	w/o – scr. **	Roscommon

* (After Extra Time) ** (Fixture conceded by Roscommon)

=== Semi-Finals ===
26 October	Louth	1-11 – 0-13	Carlow	O'Connor Park
				Referee: N. Cooney (Offaly)

26 October	Clare	1-17 – 0-10	Monaghan	O'Connor Park
				Referee: S. McCormack Meath

=== Final ===
9 November

Louth	1-11 – 1-08	Clare
White 1-5 (3f), McDonnell 0-2, O'Sullivan 0-1, C. Kelly 0-1, O'Hanlon 0-1, Hoey 0-1		M. Daly 0-3 (3f), A. Daly 1-0, Keane 0-2 (2f), Cosgrave 0-2, Enright 0-1

Duggan Park
Referee: Pat McEnaney (Monaghan)

GK	1	Niall O'Donnell (Clan na Gael)
RCB	2	Aidan Carter (St Nicholas)
FB	3	Gareth O'Neill (Cooley Kickhams)
LCB	4	David Brennan (Mattock Rangers)
RHB	5	Declan O'Sullivan (St Joseph's)
CHB	6	Breen Phillips (Newtown Blues)
LHB	7	Aaron Hoey (St Bride's)
MF	8	Paul Kelly (Newtown Blues)
MF	9	Gerry Curran (Clan na Gael)
RHF	10	Ollie McDonnell (St Joseph's)
CHF	11	Stephen Melia (St Joseph's)
LHF	12	Colin Kelly (Newtown Blues)
RCF	13	Stefan White (Clan na Gael)
FF	14	Cathal O'Hanlon (Clan na Gael)
LCF	15	Alan Doherty (St Mary's)
Substitutes:
	16	Martin Harvey (Dundalk Gaels) for Paul Kelly
	17	Ray Rooney (Dundalk Gaels) for Carter
	18	Niall Flynn (Glyde Rangers) for O'Sullivan

GK	1	James Hanrahan (Éire Óg)
RCB	2	Pádraig Gallagher (Doonbeg)
FB	3	Frankie Griffin (Kilrush Shamrocks)
LCB	4	Alan Malone (Éire Óg)
RHB	5	Barry Keating (Éire Óg)
CHB	6	Brendan Rouine (Ennistymon)
LHB	7	Charles O'Loughlin (St Joseph's, Miltown)
MF	8	Donal O'Sullivan (Kilrush Shamrocks)
MF	9	Peter Cosgrove (Éire Óg)
RHF	10	Ger Keane (St Senan's, Kilkee)
CHF	11	Martin Daly (Lissycasey)
LHF	12	Denis O'Driscoll (St Breckan's)
RCF	13	Johnny Enright (St Senan's, Kilkee)
FF	14	Aidan Daly (Kilrush Shamrocks)
LCF	15	Peadar McMahon (Kilrush Shamrocks)
Substitutes:
	16	Michael Galvin (St Senan's, Kilkee) for O'Sullivan
	17	Ger Quinlan (O'Curry's) for O'Loughlin
	18	Pat Foley (Naomh Eoin) for McMahon
