= Clare Intermediate Football Championship =

Sports competition in Ireland

- Irish: Craobh Idirmhéanach Peile an Chláir
- Founded: 1927
- Trophy: Talty Stores Cup
- No. of teams: 12
- Title holders: Corofin (5th title)
- Most titles: Kilfenora & St. Breckan's & Wolfe Tones (6 titles)
- Sponsors: TUS Midlands Midwest

The Clare Intermediate Football Championship (abbreviated to Clare IFC) is an annual GAA club competition organised by the Clare County Board for gaelic football clubs below senior level. It is contested by the top-ranking intermediate gaelic football clubs in County Clare, Ireland. It is the second-tier adult competition of the Clare football pyramid.

The Clare IFC was introduced in 1927 as a county-wide competition for gaelic football clubs deemed not strong enough for senior level, and too strong for junior level. In later years the Clare IFC was opened to the second-, third-, and/or fourth-string teams from higher-ranked clubs.

In 2016 the Clare County Board decided that from 2019 onwards the Clare senior and intermediate championships would both become revamped twelve-team competitions in an effort to make both more competitive. This meant that five clubs would lose their senior status and be relegated down to intermediate. The eleven remaining senior clubs would be joined by the 2018 intermediate champions to form the new senior championship. 2018 saw the relegation of Doora-Barefield, Kilfenora, O'Curry's, St. Breckan's and Wolfe Tones down to intermediate for 2019.

The winners of the Clare IFC are presented with the Talty Stores Cup, and are promoted to the Clare Senior Football Championship.

The current (2025) champions are Corofin who defeated Cooraclare by 2-14 to 2-09, to win their first title since 2021, and fifth overall at this grade.

== Munster club qualification ==
The winners of the Clare IFC also qualify to represent Clare in the Munster Intermediate Club Football Championship. However, if a second-, third-, or fourth-string team wins the Clare IFC, the highest finishing first-string team qualifies instead.

Five Clare clubs have reached the Munster intermediate club final:

- Corofin lost the 2006 and 2021 finals to Ardfert (Kerry) and Na Gaeil (Kerry) respectively.
- Kilmihil lost the 2008 final to St. Michael's (Kerry).
- Cratloe lost the 2009 final to Spa (Kerry).
- St. Breckan's lost the 2010 and 2019 finals to Gneeveguilla (Kerry) and Templenoe (Kerry) respectively.
- Miltown Malbay lost the 2013 final to Clyda Rovers (Cork).

No Clare club has progressed to the All-Ireland Intermediate Club Football Championship.

== 2026 Intermediate clubs ==
The twelve teams competing in the 2026 Clare Intermediate Football Championship are:

| Club | Location | Colours | Titles | Last title |
|---|---|---|---|---|
| Clondegad | Ballynacally | Red & Black | 2 | 2011 |
| Coolmeen | Coolmeen | Amber & Black | 2 | 1966 |
| Cooraclare | Cooraclare | Sky Blue & Navy | 5 | 1957 |
| Ennistymon | Ennistymon | White & Black | 2 | 2005 |
| Killimer | Killimer | Green & Yellow | 0 | – |
| Kilrush Shamrocks GAA | Kilrush | Green & White | 4 | 2018 |
| Liscannor | Liscannor | Maroon & White | 2 | 2000 |
| Michael Cusack's, Carron | Carron | Blue & Gold | 1 | 1983 |
| Naomh Eoin, Cross | Cross | Red & White | 0 | – |
| Shannon Gaels, Labasheeda | Labasheeda | Red & White | 2 | 2002 |
| The Banner, Ennis | Ennis | Saffron & Blue | 0 | – |
| Wolfe Tones, Shannon | Shannon | Green & White | 6 | 2024 |

Second-String Team

== Roll of honour ==
| # | Club | Wins | Years won |
|---|---|---|---|
| 1. | Kilfenora | 6 | 1934, 1935, 1951, 1976, 1992, 2016 |
| | St. Breckan's, Lisdoonvarna | 6 | 1936 (as Doolin), 1947 (as Doolin), 1982, 1989, 2010, 2019 |
| | Wolfe Tones, Shannon | 6 | 1973, 1975, 1990, 1996, 2014, 2024 |
| 4. | Corofin | 5 | 1987, 2006, 2015, 2021, 2025 |
| | Cooraclare | 5 | 1927, 1941, 1943, 1954, 1957 (as Cree) |
| | Kilmihil | 5 | 1928, 1958 (as Cahermurphy), 2008, 2017, 2023 |
| 7. | Kildysart | 4 | 1967, 1986, 2003, 2022 |
| | Kilmurry Ibrickane | 4 | 1939 (as Quilty), 1945 (with Clohanes), 1953 (as Mullagh), 1977 |
| | Kilrush Shamrocks | 4 | 1937, 1952, 1955, 2018 |
| | O'Curry's, Doonaha | 4 | 1942 (as Doonaha), 1950 (as Carrigaholt), 2001, 2012 |
| 11. | Clarecastle | 3 | 1984, 1993, 1998 |
| | Éire Óg, Ennis | 3 | 1946 (as Ennis Faughs), 1985, 1995 |
| | St. Senan's, Kilkee | 3 | 1938, 1940 (as Blackweir), 1974 |
| 14. | Clondegad | 2 | 1944, 2011 |
| | Coolmeen | 2 | 1959, 1966 |
| | Cratloe | 2 | 2004, 2009 |
| | Doonbeg | 2 | 1945 (with Kilmurry Ibrickane), 1949 (as Bealaha) |
| | Ennistymon | 2 | 1991, 2005 |
| | Liscannor | 2 | 1988, 2000 |
| | Shannon Gaels, Labasheeda | 2 | 1999, 2002 |
| | St. Joseph's, Doora-Barefield | 2 | 1997, 2020 |
| 22. | Ballyvaughan-Fanore | 1 | 2007 |
| | Lissycasey | 1 | 1994 |
| | Michael Cusack's, Carron | 1 | 1983 |
| | St. Joseph's, Miltown Malbay | 1 | 2013 |

- In late 1943, Ennis Dalcassians offered an opportunity to any players from their neighbours and fellow junior club, Doora-Barefield, to join with them and compete for titles at a higher level in both codes. Ennis Faughs won the 1946 intermediate football final against Kilmihil.

== See also ==
- All-Ireland Intermediate Club Football Championship
- Munster Intermediate Club Football Championship
- Clare Senior Football Championship
- Clare Junior A Football Championship
- Clare Premier Junior B Football Championship
- Clare Junior B Football Championship
- Clare Under-21 A Football Championship
- Clare Minor A Football Championship
- Cusack Cup (Clare Football League Div.1)
- Garry Cup (Clare Football League Div.2)
