= David Tubridy =

Clare Gaelic footballer

Personal information
- Born: 1987 (age 38–39)
- Occupation: Restaurant trade

Sport
- Position: Forward
Club
- Years: Club
- Doonbeg
Inter-county*
| Years | County | Apps (scores) |
| 2007–2023 | Clare | 43 (9–140) |
- *Inter County team apps and scores correct as of match played 25 June 2022.

David Tubridy (born 1987) is a Gaelic footballer. He plays senior football for Doonbeg and, formerly, the Clare county team.

Tubridy plays as a forward. The Irish Independent has described him as "the floating butterfly lurking on the Clare '45".

== Early life ==
Tubridy grew up in Doonbeg, County Clare. He attended Clare inter-county training alongside his father Tommy (who remained involved with the team following his retirement from playing). Tommy Tubridy played for Clare, until 1990. The 1992 Munster SFC win came when David Tubridy was four years of age. The jersey he wore while attending the Munster SFC final was passed around the plane the team used to fly from Shannon Airport to Dublin for the 1992 All-Ireland SFC semi-final. The entire panel signed the jersey, which Tubridy retained as a memento.

According to his father, "from nine months old he was following the ball". From an early age he was encouraged to work on both his feet.

== Playing career ==
He made his debut for Clare against Tipperary in the 2007 Tommy Murphy Cup. Páidí Ó Sé was team manager.

Tubridy became top scorer in National Football League history against Cork in May 2021, his total score in the competition after this game (22–412, i.e. 478 points) causing him to overtake Mickey Kearins. Trump International Golf Links and Hotel Ireland celebrated by giving him lifetime membership of its golf club, at which Tubridy caddied when he was a boy (including for Hugh Grant and Gary Player). Tubridy plays off six, according to the Irish Independent in 2022.

Against Roscommon in the 2022 All-Ireland SFC he was used as a substitute after 15 years of featuring from the start of games; a problematic Achilles tendon contributed to this.

He opened 2023 by confirming he had retired from inter-county football.

== Personal life ==
Tubridy runs a football academy in Doonbeg.

Around September/October 2020, he tested positive for COVID-19 from which he recovered, though he lost several kilograms of weight and could not eat for several days. His parents Tommy and Bridget had been away and, when Tommy became symptomatic after their return, both parents and son tested positive, with parents fearing the worst.

Tubridy and his father are involved in the restaurant trade. They run Tubridy's Bar & Restaurant. Visitors have included Ken Griffey Jr., Dan Marino, Ger Loughnane's 1990s All-Ireland Senior Hurling Championship winners and Jim Gavin's 2010s All-Ireland SFC winners.

== Career statistics ==
As of match played 25 June 2022

| Team | Season | National League | | | Munster | | All-Ireland | | Total | |
| Team | Season | Division | Apps | Score | Apps | Score | Apps | Score | Apps | Score |
|---|---|---|---|---|---|---|---|---|---|---|
| Clare | 2007 | | | | - | | - | | | |
| Clare | 2008 | | | | 2 | 0-08 | - | | 2 | 0-08 |
| Clare | 2009 | | | | 1 | 0-04 | 1 | 1-04 | 2 | 1-08 |
| Clare | 2010 | | | | 1 | 0-04 | 1 | 0-12 | 2 | 0-16 |
| Clare | 2011 | | | | 1 | 0-03 | 1 | 0-04 | 2 | 0-07 |
| Clare | 2012 | | | | 2 | 0-08 | 1 | 0-03 | 3 | 0-11 |
| Clare | 2013 | | | | 1 | 0-04 | 1 | 0-06 | 2 | 0-10 |
| Clare | 2014 | | | | 3 | 1-07 | 2 | 0-08 | 5 | 1-15 |
| Clare | 2015 | | | | 0 | 0-00 | 1 | 0-05 | 1 | 0-05 |
| Clare | 2016 | | | | 2 | 0-10 | 4 | 2-10 | 6 | 2-20 |
| Clare | 2017 | | | | 2 | 1-07 | 2 | 0-04 | 4 | 1-11 |
| Clare | 2018 | | | | 2 | 0-05 | 2 | 1-03 | 4 | 1-08 |
| Clare | 2019 | | | | 1 | 0-03 | 3 | 1-13 | 4 | 1-16 |
| Clare | 2020 | | | | 1 | 0-00 | - | | 1 | 0-00 |
| Clare | 2021 | | | | 1 | 1-01 | - | | 1 | 1-01 |
| Clare | 2022 | | | | 1 | 1-01 | 3 | 0-03 | 4 | 1-04 |
| Total | | | | | 21 | 4-65 | 22 | 5-75 | 43 | 9-140 |
