= Moylussa =

Mountain in County Clare, Ireland

- Maigh Lusa
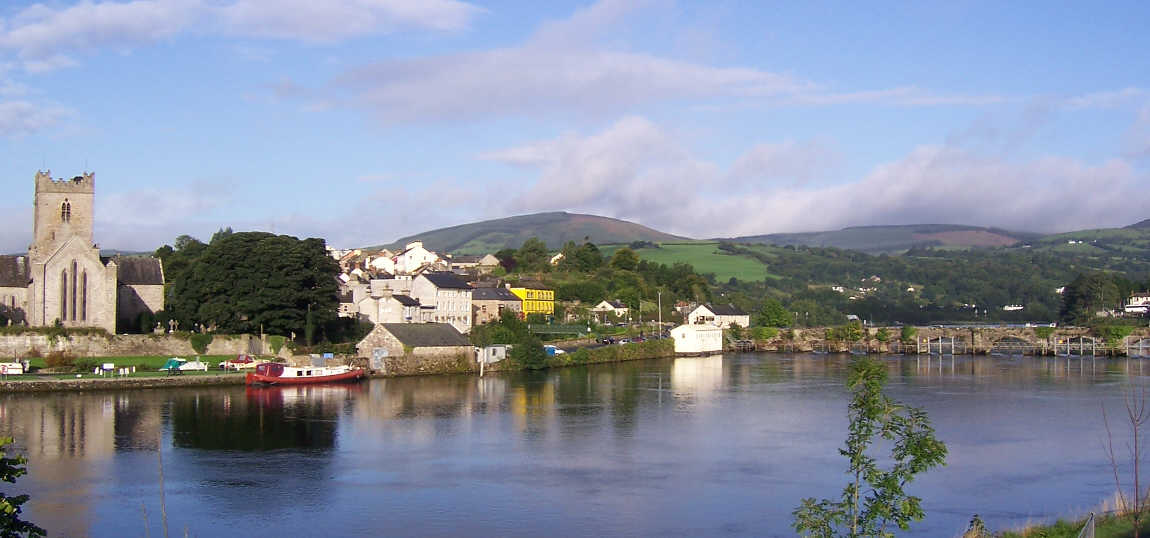
- View of Moylussa (on horizon right) from Ballina, County Tipperary

Highest point
- Elevation: 532 m (1,745 ft)
- Prominence: 502 m (1,647 ft)
- Listing: County top (Clare), Marilyn
- Coordinates: 52°50′01″N 8°31′21″W

Geography
- Location within Ireland
- Location: County Clare, Ireland
- Parent range: Slieve Bernagh Mountains
- OSI/OSNI grid: R6484375917

Moylussa (Irish: Maigh Lusa) is a mountain in the Slieve Bernagh range in western Ireland, and the highest point in County Clare at 532 metres (1,745 ft).

== Geography ==
It is situated in Kilbane, between the villages of Broadford and Bridgetown, in the east of the county and to the west of Lough Derg and the River Shannon.

== Hill walking ==
There are a number of routes to the summit; one of the most popular ascents starts from the forest car park at Ballycuggaran, Ogonnelloe. The route passes through one of the conifer plantations that have been created on the shoulder of the mountain and other nearby hills by Coillte, the state owned forestry company. The route then follows part of the long-distance path known as the East Clare Way which runs in a circular route from Killaloe and passes along the eastern flanks of Moylussa, but does not ascend to its highest point.

Beyond this the path climbs up into the open area of moorland. Originally this followed a bog road, but this has been improved by Coillte with a new shale track that extends all of the way to the summit, where a new marker stone has also been added.

There are good views from the summit of Lough Derg, Killaloe and the surrounding countryside. It is sometimes listed as having a twin summit, but recent surveys have shown that the second peak at R6511 7557 is slightly lower. The area around the summit is known to be very boggy.

== Slieve Bernagh Mountains ==
Moylussa is the highest point in the Slieve Bernagh mountain range; other nearby summits includes Cragnamurragh at 526 metres (1,726 ft), Glennagalliagh (Irish: Sliabh Ghleann na gCailleach, "Witch Valley Mountain") at 446 metres (1,463 ft), and Ballykildea at 412 metres (1,352 ft).

== See also ==
- Lists of mountains in Ireland
- List of Irish counties by highest point
- List of mountains of the British Isles by height
- List of Marilyns in the British Isles
