= 2020 Clare Senior Football Championship =

Jack Daly Cup 2020
- League: Clare GAA
- Sport: Football
- Duration: 1 August - 26 September 2020
- Number of teams: 12
- Sponsor: Pat O’Donnell & Co.

Changes From 2019
- Promoted: St. Breckan's, Lisdoonvarna
- Relegated: Corofin

Changes For 2021
- Promoted: St. Joseph's, Doora-Barefield
- Relegated: N/A

County Championship
- Winners: Kilmurry-Ibrickane (16th Title)
- Runners-up: Cratloe

Senior B Championship
- Winners: N/A

The 2020 Clare Senior Football Championship was the 125th staging of the Clare Senior Football Championship since its establishment by the Clare County Board in 1887. The championship was postponed indefinitely due to the coronavirus pandemic in Ireland. The draw for the opening round fixtures eventually took place on 1 July 2020. The championship began on 1 August 2020 and is scheduled to end in September 2020.

The 2020 champions, and holders of the Jack Daly Cup are Kilmurry-Ibrickane who won their sixteenth overall title.

== Format Change ==
Time constraints led to a revision of the championship format. The group stages were abolished and any amalgamations withdrawn. The championship saw six first-round games with the winners of these ties being drawn against each other in the quarter-final stage. The losers of the first round faced off against each other in order to produce one semi-finalist. Open draws applied to all rounds. There will be no relegation.

== Senior Championship Fixtures ==
=== First round ===
- Six winners advance to Quarter-finals
  - Six losers move to Round 2

1 August 2020 Round 1	Cratloe	0-13 2-09 (AET)	Lissycasey	Cusack Park, Ennis

1 August 2020 Round 1	Éire Óg, Ennis	2-15 1-08	Kilrush Shamrocks	Cusack Park, Ennis

1 August 2020 Round 1	Kilmurry-Ibrickane	0-12 0-09	St. Joseph's, Miltown Malbay	Cusack Park, Ennis

-

2 August 2020 Round 1	Clondegad	0-10 2-05	Kilmihil	Cusack Park, Ennis

2 August 2020 Round 1	Cooraclare	2-05 2-08	St. Breckan's, Lisdoonvarna	Hennessy Park, Miltown Malbay

2 August 2020 Round 1	Doonbeg	0-10 0-11	Ennistymon	Hennessy Park, Miltown Malbay

=== Second round ===
- Played by six losers of Round 1
  - Three winners advance to Round 3

15 August 2020 Round 2	Doonbeg	0-11 2-11	St. Joseph's, Miltown Malbay	Cooraclare

16 August 2020 Round 2	Cooraclare	2-15 1-14 (AET)	Kilrush Shamrocks	Doonbeg

16 August 2020 Round 2	Clondegad	P	Cratloe	Cusack Park, Ennis

The original fixture between Clondegad and Cratloe was postponed due to an outbreak of COVID-19 within both the Cratloe and Clondegad GAA communities. After an emergency meeting of the Clare County Board it was agreed to postpone any game that the Cratloe Senior and Junior, and Clondegad Junior teams were due to play by a period of two weeks. All subsequent games involving these clubs or their conquerors would also be delayed down the line due to this decision. This would allow sufficient time for those affected to recover before returning to play.

28 August 2020 Round 2	Clondegad	0-09 2-11	Cratloe	Cusack Park, Ennis

=== Third round ===
- Played by three winners of Round 2
- Draw to decide which team gets bye direct to Round 3B
  - Winner of Round 3B advances to Semi-finals
  - Loser of Round 3A moves to Senior B Championship

27 August 2020 Round 3A	Cooraclare	1-05 3-14	St. Joseph's, Miltown Malbay	Kilmihil

30 August 2020 Round 3B (quarter-final)	Cratloe	0-16 2-08	St. Joseph's, Miltown Malbay	Cusack Park, Ennis

=== Quarter-finals ===
- Played by six winners of Round 1
  - Three winners of this round advance to Semi-finals
  - Three losers move to Senior B Championship

15 August 2020 Quarter-Final	Ennistymon	0-08 0-11	St. Breckan's, Lisdoonvarna	Cusack Park, Ennis

15 August 2020 Quarter-Final	Kilmihil	2-07 1-14	Lissycasey	Kilrush

16 August 2020 Quarter-Final	Éire Óg, Ennis	0-10 3-06	Kilmurry-Ibrickane	Cooraclare

=== Semi-finals ===
- Played by three winners of Quarter-finals and winner of Round 3B

12 September 2020 Semi-Final	Kilmurry-Ibrickane	1-18 3-11	Lissycasey	Cusack Park, Ennis

13 September 2020 Semi-Final	Cratloe	2-16 1-15	St. Breckan's, Lisdoonvarna	Cusack Park, Ennis

== 2020 County Final ==
26 September 2020 Final	Cratloe	0-12 1-12	Kilmurry-Ibrickane	Cusack Park, Ennis

Cratloe	Kilmurry-Ibrickane

== Other Fixtures ==
=== Senior B Championship ===
- Played by three losers of Quarter-finals and loser of Round 3A

12 September 2020 B Semi-Final	Cooraclare	1-04 - 4-12	Ennistymon	Hennessy Park, Miltown Malbay

18 September 2020 B Semi-Final	Éire Óg, Ennis	4-17 - 0-07	Kilmihil	Kilmihil

25 September 2020 B Final	Éire Óg, Ennis	P	Ennistymon	Kilmihil

The original fixture between Éire Óg and Ennistymon was not played due to a dispute over the fixture. A decision on whether a re-fixture will be played or the title awarded to the team that actually showed up is pending an emergency meeting of the Clare County Board.
