= John Kennedy (Kerry Gaelic footballer) =

Kerry Gaelic footballer

Personal information
- Born: Asdee, County Kerry, Ireland

Sport
- Sport: Gaelic football
- Position: Right half-forward
Club
- Years: Club
- 1980s–2000s: Ballylongford
Inter-county
Years	County	Apps (scores)
1984–1989	Kerry	15 (0-26)
Inter-county titles
- Munster titles: 3
- All-Irelands: 3
- NFL: 1

John Kennedy is a Gaelic football manager and former player from County Kerry, Ireland. He led Clare to the 2004 Tommy Murphy Cup. He also managed the Kerry minor team between 2006 and 2009, winning Munster Minor Football Championship titles in 2006, 2008 and 2009, and leading his team to the 2006 All-Ireland Minor Football Championship final, where they lost to Roscommon after a replay. He took over as manager of the Kerry under-21 team in 2010. He played at senior level for Kerry in the mid to late 1980s, winning All-Ireland SFC titles in 1984, 1985 and 1986.

Preceded by Pat Begley	Clare Senior Football Manager; 2002–2005	Succeeded by Donie Buckley; Michael Brennan
