= Joe Joe Rouine =

Irish Gaelic footballer

Joe Joe Rouine (born 1965/1966) is an Irish former Gaelic footballer who played for the Clare county team at various grades, as well as for several clubs, including Ennistymon. He was a centre half-back.

The first team Rouine played for was St Brigid's in Ennistymon. He then played for the Moy club in the Clare Junior Football Championship, and then with Milltown Malbay. There he was influenced by Noel Walsh, and won the 1985 and 1990 Clare Senior Football Championship titles, before losing the final of the 1991 championship. In early 1993 Rouine returned to Ennistymon.

Rouine spent two years playing for the Clare minor team. He then featured for the under-21 team, including in the final of the 1988 Munster Under-21 Football Championship. He made his first senior inter-county appearance for Clare at the age of 21 in an away National Football League fixture against Wicklow in 1987. While playing with Clare, Rouine won an All-Ireland Senior B Football Championship title in 1991 and a Munster Senior Football Championship medal in 1992.

Rouine also spent time as a member of the Clare junior team. He won an All-Ireland title with Athenry Agricultural College.

Rouine's younger brother Brendan also played for Clare. The Rouines are natives of Rineen, close to Ennistymon. Rouine went to school in Lahinch. As of 1993, he was involved with the Defence Forces in Lahinch. He married a woman from Kilfenora. His father John Joe played the same sport.
