= Kieran O'Mahony (Gaelic footballer) =

Irish Gaelic footballer

Kieran O'Mahony is a former Gaelic footballer who played for Doonbeg and the Clare county team. He is known as "Nail". O'Mahony won a Munster Senior Football Championship medal in 1992.

He has been chairman of Doonbeg and began managing the club's senior team in 2010. As manager he led Doonbeg to the 2010 Clare Senior Football Championship title.
