= Gerry Killeen =

Irish Gaelic footballer

Gerry Killeen (born 27 October 1961) is an Irish former Gaelic footballer who played for Doonbeg, as well as the Clare county team. He made his National League debut for Clare in an away game against Sligo in 1982.

Killeen won a Munster Senior Football Championship medal in 1992.
