= Clare Junior A Football Championship =

Sports competition in Ireland

- Irish: Craobh Soisear A Peile an Chláir
- Founded: 1922
- Trophy: Michael Toner Cup
- No. of teams: 16
- Title holders: Killimer (2nd title)
- Most titles: Éire Óg & Kilmurry Ibrickane (7 titles)
- Sponsors: Martin Murphy Building & Civil Contractors Ltd.

The Clare Junior A Football Championship (abbreviated to Clare JAFC) is an annual GAA club competition organised by the Clare County Board for gaelic football clubs below intermediate and senior level. It is contested by the top-ranking junior gaelic football clubs in County Clare, Ireland. It is the third-tier adult competition of the Clare football pyramid.

The Clare JAFC was introduced in 1922 as a county-wide competition for gaelic football clubs deemed not strong enough for senior level. Intermediate level was introduced in 1927 for the same reason and placed above the Clare JAFC in the Clare football pyramid. In later years the Clare JAFC was opened to the second-, third-, and/or fourth-string teams from higher-ranked clubs.

The winners of the Clare JAFC are presented with the Michael Toner Cup, and are promoted to the Clare Intermediate Football Championship.

As of 2025, the holders were Killimer who defeated Lissycasey by 0-17 to 1-13, to win their first title since 2023, and second overall at this grade.

== Munster club qualification ==
The winners of the Clare JAFC also qualify to represent Clare in the Munster Junior Club Football Championship. However, if a second-, third-, or fourth-string team wins the Clare JAFC, the highest finishing first-string team qualifies instead.

Three Clare clubs have reached the Munster junior club final:

- Éire Óg lost the 2001 final to St. Michael's (Kerry).
- O'Callaghan's Mills lost the 2007 final to Canovee (Cork).
- Coolmeen lost the 2015 Munster final to Templenoe (Kerry).

No Clare club has progressed to the All-Ireland Junior Club Football Championship.

== 2026 Junior A clubs ==
The sixteen teams competing in the 2026 Clare Junior A Football Championship are:

Club	Location	Colours	Titles	Last title
Ballyvaughan-Fanore	Ballyvaughan / Fanore	Orange & Black	1	2003
Clarecastle	Clarecastle	Black & White	3	2012
Clondegad	Ballynacally	Red & Black	4	2000
Clooney-Quin	Clooney / Quin	Green & Red	2	2009
Corofin	Corofin	Red & White	1	1978
Cooraclare	Cooraclare	Sky Blue & Navy	3	1998
Cratloe	Cratloe	Blue & White	1	2002
Éire Óg, Ennis	Ennis	Red & White	7	2018
Kilfenora	Kilfenora	Green & Yellow	5	2010
Kilmurry Ibrickane	Quilty	Green & Red	7	2012
Lissycasey| Lissycasey	Maroon & White	4	1992	
O'Curry's, Doonaha	Doonaha	Yellow & Green	3	1995
Parteen-Meelick	Parteen / Meelick	Blue & Red	2	2016
St. Breckan's, Lisdoonvarna	Lisdoonvarna	Maroon & White	2	1979
St. Senan's, Kilkee	Kilkee	Blue & White	5	1996
Wolfe Tones, Shannon	Shannon	Green & White	2	1972

Second-String Team

== Roll of honour ==
#	Club	Wins	Years won
1.	Éire Óg, Ennis	7	1927 (as Ennis Dals), 1943 (as Ennis Dals), 1968 (as Ennis Faughs), 1975, 2001, 2013, 2018
	Kilmurry Ibrickane	7	1929, 1930, 1932, 1933 (as Quilty), 1950 (as Mullagh), 1994, 2006
3.	Coolmeen	6	1922, 1958, 1964, 1983, 1999, 2015
4.	Kildysart	5	1945, 1953, 1966, 1984, 2008
	Kilfenora	5	1931, 1934, 1947, 1977, 2010
	Naomh Eoin, Cross	5	1991, 1997, 2005, 2014, 2017
	O'Curry's, Doonaha	5	1940 (as Doonaha), 1948 (as Carrigaholt), 1961, 1976 (as St. Cronan’s with Shannon Rangers), 1995
	St. Senan's, Kilkee	5	1926, 1970, 1974, 1990, 1996
9.	Clondegad	4	1942 (as Ballycorick), 1963 (as Moohane), 1969, 2000
	Kilmihil	4	1925, 1937, 1955, 1956 (as Cahermurphy)
	Lissycasey	4	1938 (as Caherea), 1971, 1981, 1992
	Michael Cusack's, Carron	4	1946 (as Belharbour), 1962, 1980, 2019, 2024
13.	Clarecastle	3	1936, 1982, 2012
	Cooraclare	3	1965, 1988, 1998
	Ennistymon	3	1973, 1987, 2021
	Kilrush Shamrocks	3	1944, 1951 (as Ballykett), 1954 (as Ballykett)
	St. Joseph's, Miltown Malbay	3	1923, 1924, 1949
18.	Clooney-Quin	2	2004, 2009
	Doonbeg	2	1928, 1939
	Killimer	2	2023, 2025
	Liscannor	2	1985, 2022
	Parteen-Meelick	2	2011 (as Meelick), 2016 (as Meelick)
	Scariff	2	1952, 1960
	Shannon Gaels, Labasheeda	2	1941, 1959
	Shannon Rangers	2	1957, 1976 (as St. Cronan’s with O’Curry’s),
	St. Breckan's, Lisdoonvarna	2	1935 (as Doolin), 1979
	St. Joseph's, Doora-Barefield	2	1989, 1993
	Wolfe Tones, Shannon	2	1967, 1972
29.	Ballyvaughan-Fanore	1	2003 (as Ballyvaughan)
	Corofin	1	1978
	Cratloe	1	2002
	Moy	1	1986
	O'Callaghan's Mills	1	2007
	The Banner	1	2020

- In late 1943, Ennis Dalcassians offered an opportunity to any players from their neighbours and fellow junior club, Doora-Barefield, to join with them and compete for titles at a higher level in both codes. Ennis Faughs won the 1968 junior A football final.
- St. Cronan's were an amalgamation of the O'Curry's and the now defunct Shannon Rangers club from West Clare. St. Cronan's won the 1976 junior A football final.

== See also ==
- All-Ireland Junior Club Football Championship
- Munster Junior Club Football Championship
- Clare Senior Football Championship
- Clare Intermediate Football Championship
- Clare Under-21 A Football Championship
- Cusack Cup (Clare Football League Division 1)
