= Donie Buckley =

Irish Gaelic footballer and coach

Donal Buckley
Personal information
- Born: Early 1960s

Sport
- Sport: Gaelic football
- Position: Full-forward
Club
- Years: Club
- 1980s?: Castleisland Desmonds
Club titles
- Kerry titles: 2
- Munster titles: 2
- All-Ireland Titles: 1

Donie Buckley (born early 1960s) is an Irish Gaelic football coach and former player. He played at full forward with his local club Castleisland Desmonds but never with the Kerry county team. His coaching has taken him all along the western coast from Clare to Galway, to Limerick, Kerry and Mayo.

== Career ==
Buckley scored a last-minute goal for Castleisland Desmonds in the final of the 1985 All-Ireland Senior Club Football Championship to defeat St Vincents. Soon after retiring from playing he became involved in coaching.

His coaching career began in Clare where he led Milltown Malbay in 1990 and Faughs in 1994 to Clare Senior Football Championships. He served as joint manager with Michael Brennan of the Clare county team in 2006.

He then moved on to the Galway county team, working as forwards coach under the management of Peter Ford for a year. Then onwards to Galway club Moycullen, whom he led to the 2008 All-Ireland Intermediate Club Football Championship.

Buckley then served as selector alongside Mickey Ned O'Sullivan with Limerick for three years, during which time the county experienced narrow losses in the finals of the 2009 and 2010 Munster Senior Football Championships. O'Sullivan's previous coach Michael McGeehin, who left the Limerick team because of work commitments, recommended Buckley to O'Sullivan.

He joined the Kerry senior setup in 2011. He then had to have knee surgery. He stood down from Kerry ahead of the start of the 2012 Championship, when Donegal knocked them out in the All-Ireland quarter-final.

James Horan invited Buckley to join his Mayo management team in 2012. He was not there for Mayo's 2012 All-Ireland Senior Football Championship Final defeat to Donegal but spent six seasons there from 2013 until 2018. Buckley maintained his place throughout Horan's first spell as Mayo manager, then the replacement duo, and then the Stephen Rochford-led management team. Leadership that led Mayo to over half a decade of qualification for either All-Ireland finals or semi-finals, playing a much admired style of play.

According to the Irish Independent, "The technique and not just the ferocity of Mayo's tackling, epitomised by that same first half (of the 2017 All-Ireland Senior Football Championship Final), is seen as another Buckley trademark."

Buckley left Mayo and returned to the Kerry setup after Peter Keane took over as manager at the end of 2018. He parted company with Kerry in 2020.

Between 2011 and 2019 (nine seasons) Buckley was the coach of teams that played in five All-Ireland SFC finals (as well as two replays) and seven semi-finals (and two more replays).

Buckley joined Monaghan ahead of the 2021 season, replacing Conor Laverty after Laverty's appointment as Down under-20 manager.

Buckley returned to Mayo in August 2022, upon the announcement of Kevin McStay's appointment as manager. McStay named him as his head coach and selector.

== Style ==
Buckley's background as civil engineer in County Clare has been attributed to his approach to coaching. O'Sullivan said in 2019: "Donie looks at football in a different way. He brought a different dimension to it, he brought a mathematical side to it. He used logic to analyse opposition and play to your own strengths. He was a big man for devising smallsided games where players got the opportunity to make decisions for themselves. It's common now but it wasn't then... Donie never stands still, he is pushing back his own concepts of the game the whole time. The game is always evolving so Donie will always evolve and find new ways, new approaches, new creativity. He never repeats anything." He studies American sports such as basketball and their own version of football. Buckley himself does not court publicity, the Irish Independent describing him as an "enigmatic character."

== Honours ==
=== Player ===
- All-Ireland Senior Club Football Championship: 1985

=== Coach ===
- All-Ireland Senior Football Championship runner-up: 2011, 2016, 2017, 2019
- Munster Senior Football Championship runner-up: 2009, 2010
- All-Ireland Intermediate Club Football Championship: 2008
- Clare Senior Football Championship: 1990, 1994

== Personal life ==
Married to Áine, the couple holiday in Florida each winter and Buckley plays golf.
