= Tommy Tubridy =

Clare Gaelic footballer

Personal information
- Occupation: Restaurant trade

Sport
Inter-county
- Years: County
- 1970s–1990: Clare

Tommy Tubridy is a former Gaelic footballer who played senior football for Clare over a twelve-year period that lasted until 1990.

Tubridy played in the "Milltown Massacre", a game against Kerry in which Clare let in nine goals that contributed to a 32-point loss.

His son David also played for Clare, making his debut in 2007.

He and David are involved in the restaurant trade. They run Tubridy's Bar & Restaurant in Doonbeg. Visitors have included Ken Griffey Jr., Dan Marino, Ger Loughnane's 1990s All-Ireland Senior Hurling Championship winners and Jim Gavin's 2010s All-Ireland SFC winners.

Around September/October 2020, Tubridy tested positive for COVID-19. He had been away with his wife Bridget and became symptomatic after their return, then tested positive, with his wife and son David later joining him as COVID-19 positive. His symptoms included headaches and a cough.
