= Gordon Kelly =

Clare Gaelic footballer

Personal information
- Born: 1980s

Sport
- Position: Defender
Club
- Years: Club
- Milltown Malbay
Inter-county
- Years: County
- 2006–2020: Clare

for the Canadian-born radio and television personality who was possibly born with this name, see Art Linkletter
for the gridiron football player, see Gorden Kelley

Gordon Kelly (born 1980s) is a Gaelic footballer who plays for the Milltown Malbay club and, from 2006 until announcing his retirement at the end of 2020, at senior level for the Clare county team.

Kelly made his debut for Clare in the 2006 National Football League and went on to become one of the longest playing special defenders of his generation. He played in the 2012 Munster Senior Football Championship run to the final and the 2016 All-Ireland Senior Football Championship run to the quarter-final, as well as the run that brought promotion for Clare to Division 3 of the National Football League in 2014 and, two years later, promotion to Division 2. He played for his county until he was 37 years old.
