= Quilty GAA =

Gaelic football club in County Clare, Ireland

- County: Clare

Senior Club Championships
	All Ireland	Munster champions	Clare champions
Football:	0	0	3

Quilty GAA is a defunct Gaelic Athletic Association club in County Clare, Ireland. The club was based in Quilty The club only played gaelic football.

The club won three times the Clare Senior Football Championship. Most remarkable is the win of 1935, when they played the final against their fellow parishioners and later amalgamation partners Kilmurry Ibrickane.

In the 1970s Quilty GAA and Kilmurry Ibrickane amalgamated to form Kilmurry Ibrickane GAA.

== Honours ==
- Clare Senior Football Champions (3): 1935, 1936, 1939
- Clare Football League Div. 1 (Cusack Cup) (3): 1933, 1934, 1935
- Clare Junior A Football Championship (1): 1933
