= Seamus Clancy =

Irish Gaelic footballer

Personal information
- Born: County Clare, Ireland
- Height: 6 ft 0 in (183 cm)

Sport
- Sport: Gaelic football
- Position: -Back
Club
- Years: Club
- Corofin
Club titles
- All-Ireland Titles: 1 b
Inter-county
- Years: County
- 1980s-1990s: Clare
Inter-county titles
- Munster titles: 1
- All Stars: 1

Seamus Clancy is a Gaelic footballer from Kilnaboy County Clare. He won a Munster Senior Football Championship in 1992 when Clare had a surprise win over Kerry in the final, he later won an All Star award and is to date Clare's only football All Star. He also won an All Ireland B Title with Clare in 1991. He won McGrath Cup medals in 1990, 1991, 1994 as captain and 1995.
