= James Hanrahan (Gaelic footballer) =

Clare Gaelic football goalkeeper

Personal information
- Born: County Clare, Ireland

Sport
- Sport: Gaelic football
- Position: Goalkeeper
Club
- Years: Club
- Éire Óg, Ennis
Inter-county
- Years: County
- 1989-2002: Clare
Inter-county titles
- Munster titles: 1
- All Stars: 0

James Hanrahan was a Gaelic footballer from Ennis, County Clare. He won a Munster Senior Football Championship in 1992 when Clare had a surprise win over Kerry in the final, he played in other finals in 1997 and 2000.

Hanrahan was appointed goalkeeping coach of the Clare seniors under the management of Peter Keane.
