= Bridgetown, County Clare =

Village in County Clare, Ireland

Bridgetown Baile an Droichid
- Village
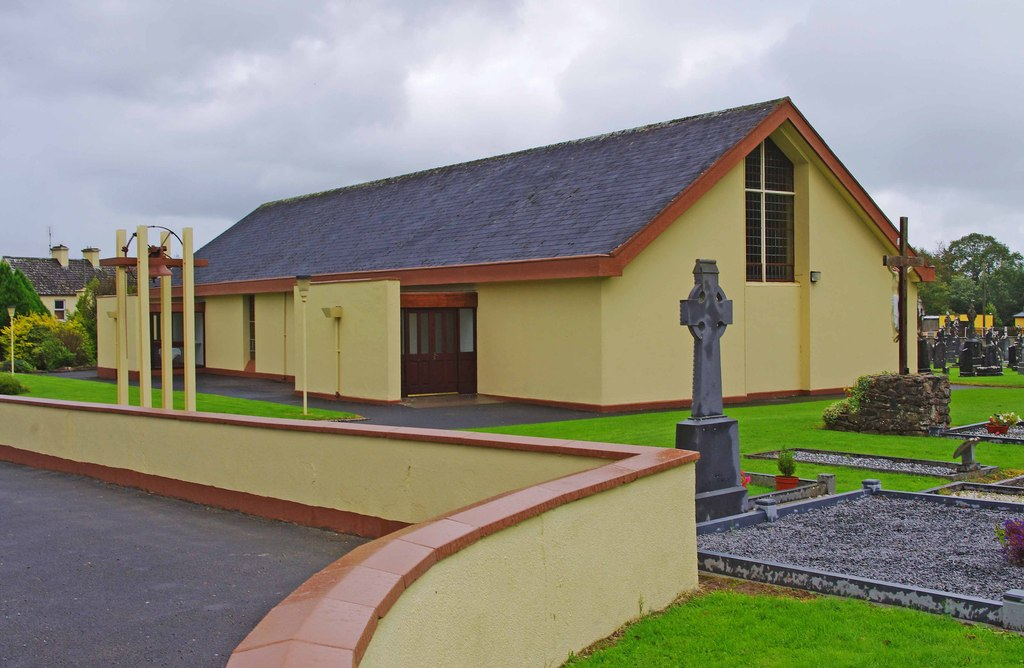
- St. Thomas Church

- Location in Ireland
- Coordinates: 52°45′45″N 8°31′31″W
- Country: Ireland
- Province: Munster
- County: County Clare
- Time zone: UTC+0 (WET)
  - Summer (DST): UTC-1 (IST (WEST))

Bridgetown (Irish: Baile an Droichid) is a small village in eastern County Clare, Ireland. It is located near Killaloe and has a National School. St. Thomas Church was originally built in 1832 and was mostly rebuilt during the renovations in 1970.

== Archaeology ==
A small burial ground 500 meters west and a holy well, Tobernasool (Irish: Tobar na Súil), 300 metres south are noted on historic maps.

== See also ==
- List of towns and villages in Ireland
