= St. Breckan's GAA =

Gaelic games club in County Clare, Ireland

- CLG Naomh Breacáin
- Founded: 1971
- County: Clare
- Colours: Maroon and White
- Grounds: The Sports Complex, Lisdoonvarna

Playing kits
| Home Kit | Away Kit |

Senior Club Championships
| | All Ireland | Munster champions | Clare champions |
|---|---|---|---|
| Football: | - | - | 0 |

St. Breckan's GAA is a Gaelic Athletic Association club located in the town of Lisdoonvarna, County Clare, Ireland. The club field teams at all levels from U7 GoGames, through youth (U13-17) and adult (Junior A & Senior) in Gaelic football competitions. The club, which represents the areas of Lisdoonvarna, Doolin, Kilshanny and Toovahera, was founded in 1971 and celebrated its 50th anniversary in 2021.

In October 2023, the club reached the final of the 2023 Clare Senior Football Championship where they lost by two points to Cratloe. It was their third defeat in a senior football final in what was their first appearance since 1996.

== Honours ==
- Clare Senior Football Championship (0): (runners-up in 1985, 1996, 2023)
- Clare Football League Div. 1 (Cusack Cup) (2): 2005, 2022
- Munster Intermediate Club Football Championship (0): (runners-up in 2010, 2019)
- Clare Intermediate Football Championship (6): 1936 (as Doolin), 1947 (as Doolin), 1982, 1989, 2010, 2019
- Clare Junior A Football Championship (2): 1935 (as Doolin), 1979
- Clare Under-21 A Football Championship (1): 1985
