= Coolmeen, County Clare =

Village in Co Clare. In same format as similar villages

Coolmeen − Cúil Mhín Kilfidane − Cill Fheadáin
- Village
- Location within Ireland
- Coordinates: 52.649887°N 9.21573°W
- Country: Ireland
- Province: Munster
- County: Clare

Coolmeen (Irish: Cúil Mhín), formerly called Kilfiddane (Irish: Cill Fheadáin), is a townland and small village in County Clare, Ireland. It is in the Catholic parish of Coolmeen.

== Location ==
Coolmeen lies in the southeast of the barony of Clonderalaw. It is 4.5 miles (7.2 km) southwest of Kildysart.

== Facilities ==
The parish of Coolmeen is in the Roman Catholic Diocese of Killaloe. The parish has two churches, St Benedict's in Coolmeen and St Mary's in Cranny.

Coolmeen has several GAA pitches at Coolmeen GAA club grounds.
