= Kilmurry Ibrickane GAA =

Gaelic football club in County Clare, Ireland

Kilmurry-Ibrickane GAA
- Cill Mhuire Uí Bhreacáin
- Founded: 1914
- County: Clare
- Colours: Green with Red stripe
- Grounds: Pairc Naomh Mhuire

Playing kits
Standard colours

Senior Club Championships
	All Ireland	Munster champions	Clare champions
Football:	0	2	16

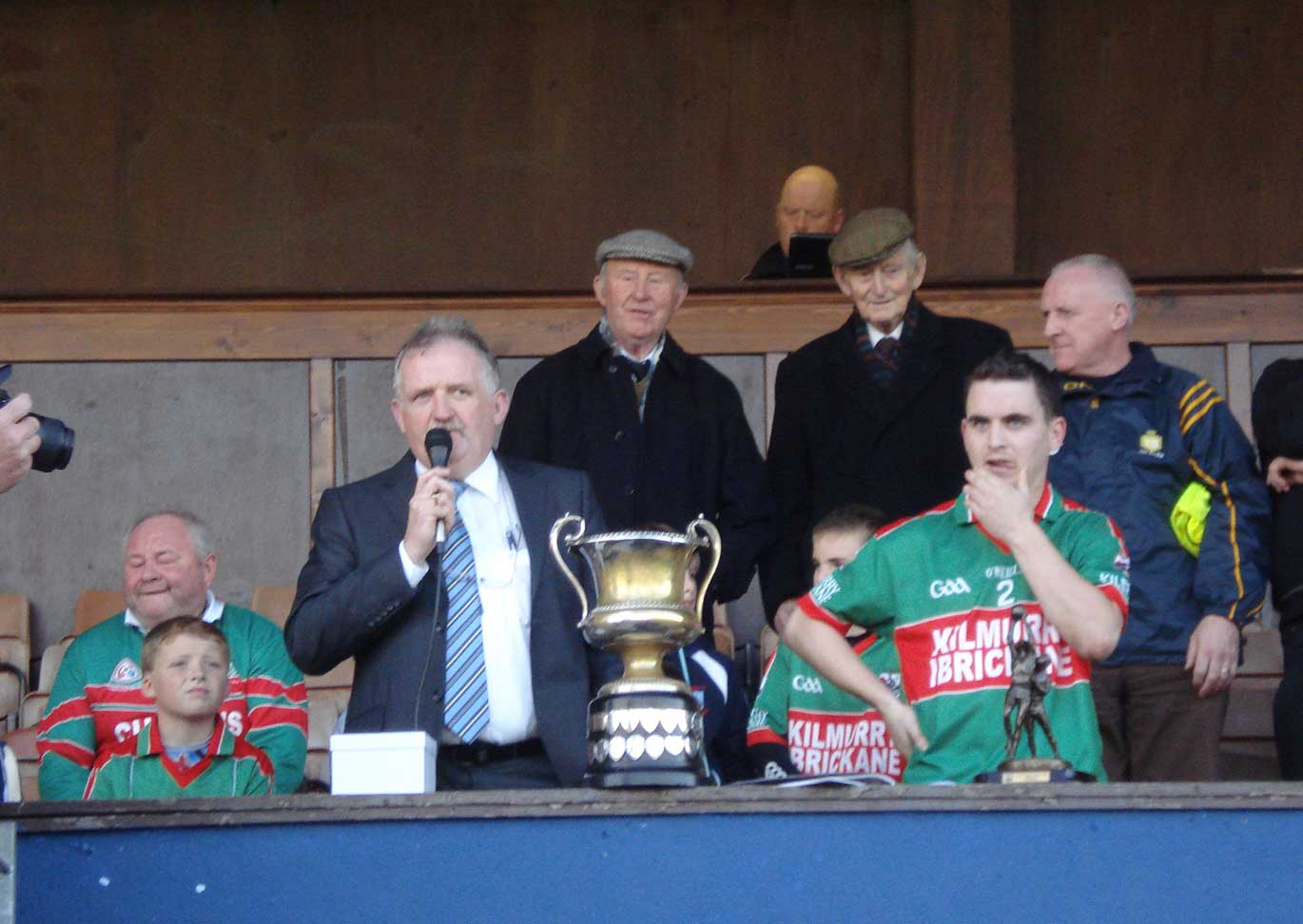
Presentation of the Jack Daly Trophy to Kilmurry Ibrickane GAA (KIB) captain Martin McMahon. KIB won the Clare Senior Football Championship by winning from St Joseph's, Doora-Barefield on a scoreline of 0-10 to 0-04 on 21 October 2012.

Kilmurry-Ibrickane GAA is a Gaelic Athletic Association club in County Clare, Ireland.

The club only plays gaelic football, and were Clare Senior Football Champions last in 2020, and won the Munster Senior Club Football Championship in 2004 and 2009.

== History ==
A club bearing the parish name came into existence in 1914. Prior to this a team from the village of Coore reached the senior county final in 1890, losing to Ennis Dalcassians. In 1924 the club reached its first senior county final, losing to Kilrush Shamrocks. In 1933 the club won its first Clare Senior Football Championship defeating St. Senan's, Kilkee in the final. In 1935 two teams from the parish competed in a historic county final with Quilty the victors. Quilty retained their title in 1936 defeating Kilrush Shamrocks in the final, before losing to them in the 1937 final. In 1939 Quilty won their third and final title, again defeating Kilrush Shamrocks in the final.

After a thirty year wait, the club won its second Senior title in 1963, defeating Shannon Gaels, Labasheeda in the county final. In 1966 the club won a Senior and Under-21 double.

In the 1970s the club fully amalgamated with its fellow parishioners Quilty. The club retained the name Kilmurry-Ibrickane GAA but started playing on the grounds of the former club in Quilty.

In 1993 the club returned to the senior county final for the first time in twenty-seven years, defeating their neighbours Doonbeg to win the parish's seventh Clare Senior Football Championship.

Between 1995 and 2007 the club won nine Under-21 titles. This directly led to the clubs most successful period at senior level - two Munster Club titles (2004 and 2009), nine Clare SFC titles (2002, 2004, 2008, 2009, 2011, 2012, 2016, 2017 and 2020), and ten Cusack Cups (1997, 2008, 2011, 2012, 2013, 2014, 2015, 2016, 2017 and 2018).

In 2004 the club won its first Munster Senior Club Football Championship when they defeated Stradbally of Waterford after a replay. In December 2009, a second Munster Club title was won when the Kerins O'Rahilly's, Tralee of Kerry were defeated on a score line of 0-07 to 0-06. In February 2010, the club reached the All-Ireland Senior Club Football Championship final with a 1–14 to 0–08 victory against Portlaoise of Laois in the semi-final. In the final, the club lost to St Gall's, Belfast of Antrim by 1–05 to 0–13 before 34,357 in Croke Park.

== Major honours ==
- All-Ireland Senior Club Football Championship Runners-Up: 2010
- Munster Senior Club Football Championship (2): 2004, 2009
- Clare Senior Football Championship (16): 1933, 1935 (as Quilty), 1936 (as Quilty), 1939 (as Quilty), 1963, 1966, 1993, 2002, 2004, 2008, 2009, 2011, 2012, 2016, 2017, 2020
- Clare Football League Div. 1 (Cusack Cup) (13): 1933 (as Quilty), 1934 (as Quilty), 1935 (as Quilty), 1997, 2008, 2011, 2012, 2013, 2014, 2015, 2016, 2017, 2018
- Clare Intermediate Football Championship (4): 1939 (as Quilty), 1945 (with Clohanes), 1953 (as Mullagh), 1977
- Clare Junior A Football Championship (7): 1929, 1930, 1932, 1933 (as Quilty), 1950 (as Mullagh), 1994, 2006
- Clare Under-21 A Football Championship (13): 1966, 1983, 1984, 1995, 1996, 1998, 2001, 2003, 2004, 2005, 2006, 2007, 2016

== Notable people involved ==
- Odhran O'Dwyer - as player
- Marty Morrissey - as coach, mainly at youth level
- Keelan Sexton
