= Doonbeg GAA =

Gaelic football club in County Clare, Ireland

- Founded: 1954
- County: Clare
- Nickname: Magpies
- Colours: Black with White
- Grounds: Páirc Uí Seancháin, Doonbeg

Playing kits
Standard colours

Senior Club Championships
	All Ireland	Munster champions	Clare champions
Football:	0	1	18

Doonbeg GAA is a Gaelic Athletic Association club from the village of Doonbeg in County Clare, Ireland. The club only plays gaelic football, and have won the Clare Senior Football Championship on eighteen occasions. They are the 2010 champions, having defeated Liscannor in the final by 0-11 to 0-7.

== History ==
The club was founded in 1954 and won its first senior championship in 1955. On two occasions Doonbeg succeeded in recording a 3 in a row double (championship and league) 1967-68-69, and 1972-73-74. The club's greatest achievement was the winning of the 1998 Munster Club Championship, the first Clare club to capture this title. Padraig Gallagher led the side to defeat Moyle Rovers of Tipperary by 0-07 to 0-04. Another notable day for the club was Clare's 1992 Munster championship victory over Kerry in the Gaelic Grounds. Francis McInerney captained the team, with fellow Doonbeg clubmen, Gerry Killeen, Kieran O'Mahony, Padraig Conway, Pat Blake and selector, Pat Hanrahan, playing a part in the win.

== Honours ==
- Munster Senior Club Football Championship (1): 1998
- Clare Senior Football Championship (18): 1955, 1961, 1967, 1968, 1969, 1972, 1973, 1974, 1982, 1983, 1988, 1991, 1995, 1996, 1998, 1999, 2001, 2010
- Clare Football League Div. 1 (Cusack Cup) (16): 1954 (as Clohanes), 1957, 1961, 1962, 1965, 1967, 1968, 1969, 1970, 1972, 1981, 1982, 1983, 1991, 1994, 1995
- Clare Intermediate Football Championship (2): 1945 (as Clohanes with Kilmurry-Ibrickane), 1949 (as Bealaha)
- Clare Junior A Football Championship (2): 1928, 1939
- Clare Under-21 A Football Championship (3): 1964, 1965, 1974
