= County Clare =

County in Ireland

Coordinates: 52°50′N 9°00′W

County Clare Contae an Chláir
- County
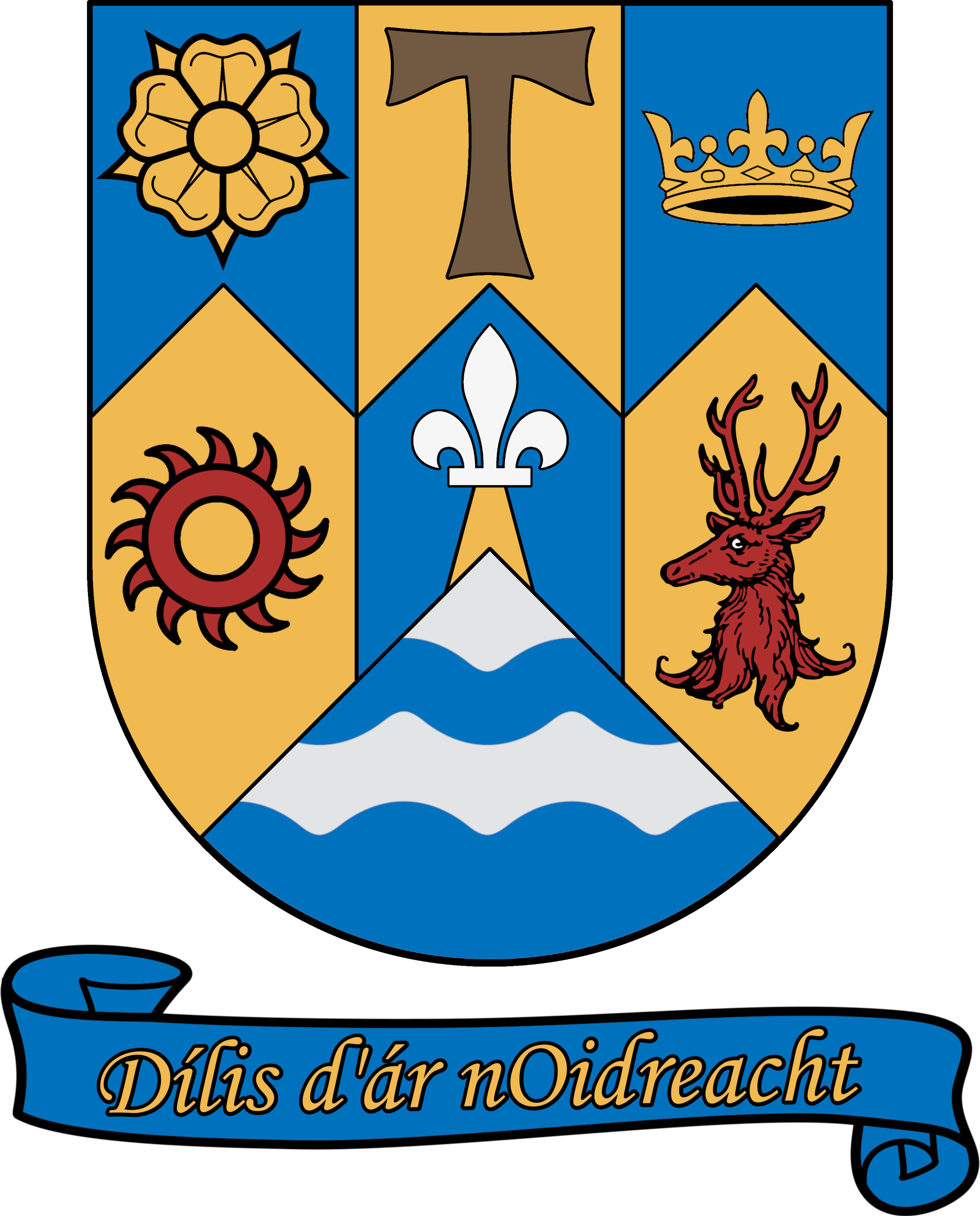
- Coat of arms
- Nickname: The Banner County
- Motto: Irish: Dílis d'ár nOidreacht "True to our heritage"
- Interactive map of County Clare
- Country: Ireland
- Province: Munster
- Region: Southern
- Established: 1565
- County town: Ennis

Government
  - Local authority: Clare County Council
  - Dáil constituency: Clare
  - EP constituency: South

Area
  - Total: 3,450 km^{2} (1,330 sq mi)
  - Rank: 7th
- Highest elevation (Moylussa): 532 m (1,745 ft)

Population (2022)
  - Total: 127,938
  - Rank: 19th
- Time zone: UTC±0 (WET)
  - Summer (DST): UTC+1 (IST)
- Eircode routing keys: H62, H91, V14, V15, V94, V95
- Telephone area codes: 061, 065 (primarily)
- ISO 3166 code: IE-CE
- Vehicle index mark code: CE
- Website: Official website

County Clare (/ˈklɛər/ CLAIR, Irish: Contae an Chláir) is a county in the province of Munster in the Southern part of Ireland, bordered on the west by the Atlantic Ocean. Clare County Council is the local authority. The county had a population of 127,938 at the 2022 census. The county seat and largest settlement is Ennis.

== Etymology ==
There are two main hypotheses for the origins of the county name "Clare". One is that the name is derived from Thomas de Clare, an Anglo-Norman peer and soldier from the de Clare family, who was deeply embroiled in local politics and fighting in the 1270s and 1280 and had acquired land in Kilkenny and Thomond that included the Castle of Clare. In 1590 County Clare was named after the castle, which is in a strategic location. An alternative hypothesis is that the county name Clare comes from the settlement of Clare (now Clarecastle), whose Irish name Clár (plank bridge) refers to a crossing over the River Fergus.

== Geography and subdivisions ==
Clare is north-west of the River Shannon covering a total area of 3,450 square kilometres (1,330 sq mi). Clare is the seventh largest of Ireland's 32 traditional counties in area and the 19th largest in terms of population. It is bordered by two counties in Munster and one county in Connacht: County Limerick to the south, County Tipperary to the east, and County Galway to the north. Clare's nickname is the Banner County.

=== Baronies, parishes and townlands ===
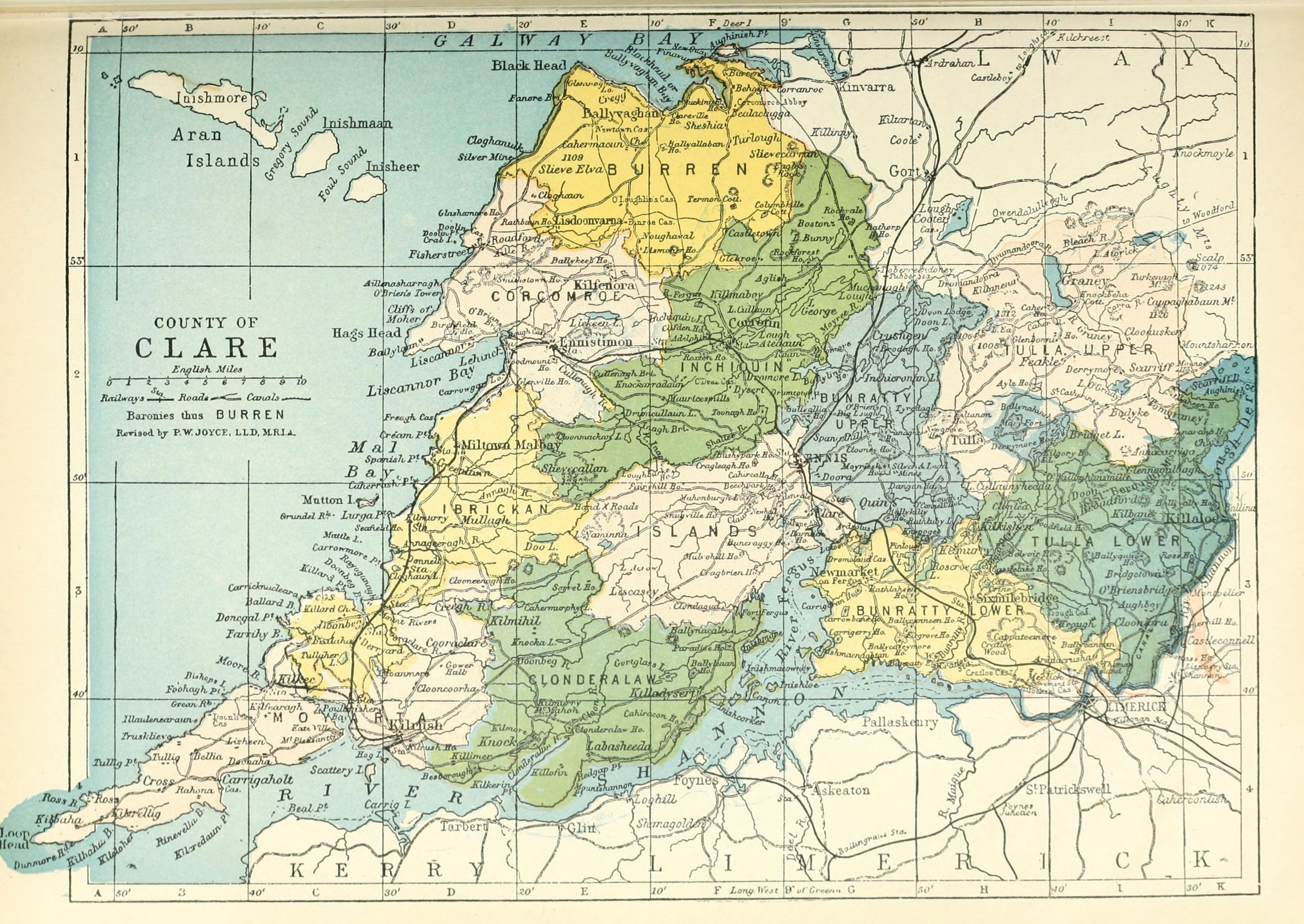
Baronies of Clare

The county is divided into the baronies of Bunratty Lower, Bunratty Upper, Burren, Clonderalaw, Corcomroe, Ibrickan, Inchiquin, Islands, Moyarta, Tulla Lower and Tulla Upper. These in turn are divided into civil parishes, which are themselves divided into townlands. These divisions are cadastral, defining land boundaries and ownership, rather than administrative.

=== Towns and villages ===
- Ardnacrusha
- Ballynacally
- Ballyvaughan
- Barefield
- Boston
- Bridgetown
- Broadford
- Bunratty
- Carrigaholt
- Carron
- Clarecastle
- Clonlara
- Connolly
- Coolmeen
- Cooraclare
- Corofin
- Cranny
- Cratloe
- Cree (Creegh)
- Cross
- Crusheen
- Doolin
- Doonaha
- Doonbeg
- Ennis
- Ennistymon
- Fanore
- Feakle
- Inagh
- Inch
- Kilbaha
- Kilfenora
- Kilkee
- Kilkishen
- Kildysart
- Killaloe
- Killimer
- Kilmaley
- Kilmihil
- Kilmurry McMahon
- Kilnaboy
- Kilnamona
- Kilrush
- Labasheeda
- Lahinch
- Liscannor
- Lisdoonvarna
- Lissycasey
- Meelick
- Milltown Malbay
- Mountshannon
- Mullagh
- Newmarket-on-Fergus
- O'Brien's Bridge
- O'Callaghan's Mills
- Ogonnelloe
- Parteen
- Quilty
- Quin
- Ruan
- Scariff
- Shannon
- Sixmilebridge
- Toonagh
- Tuamgraney
- Tubber
- Tulla
- Whitegate

=== Physical geography ===
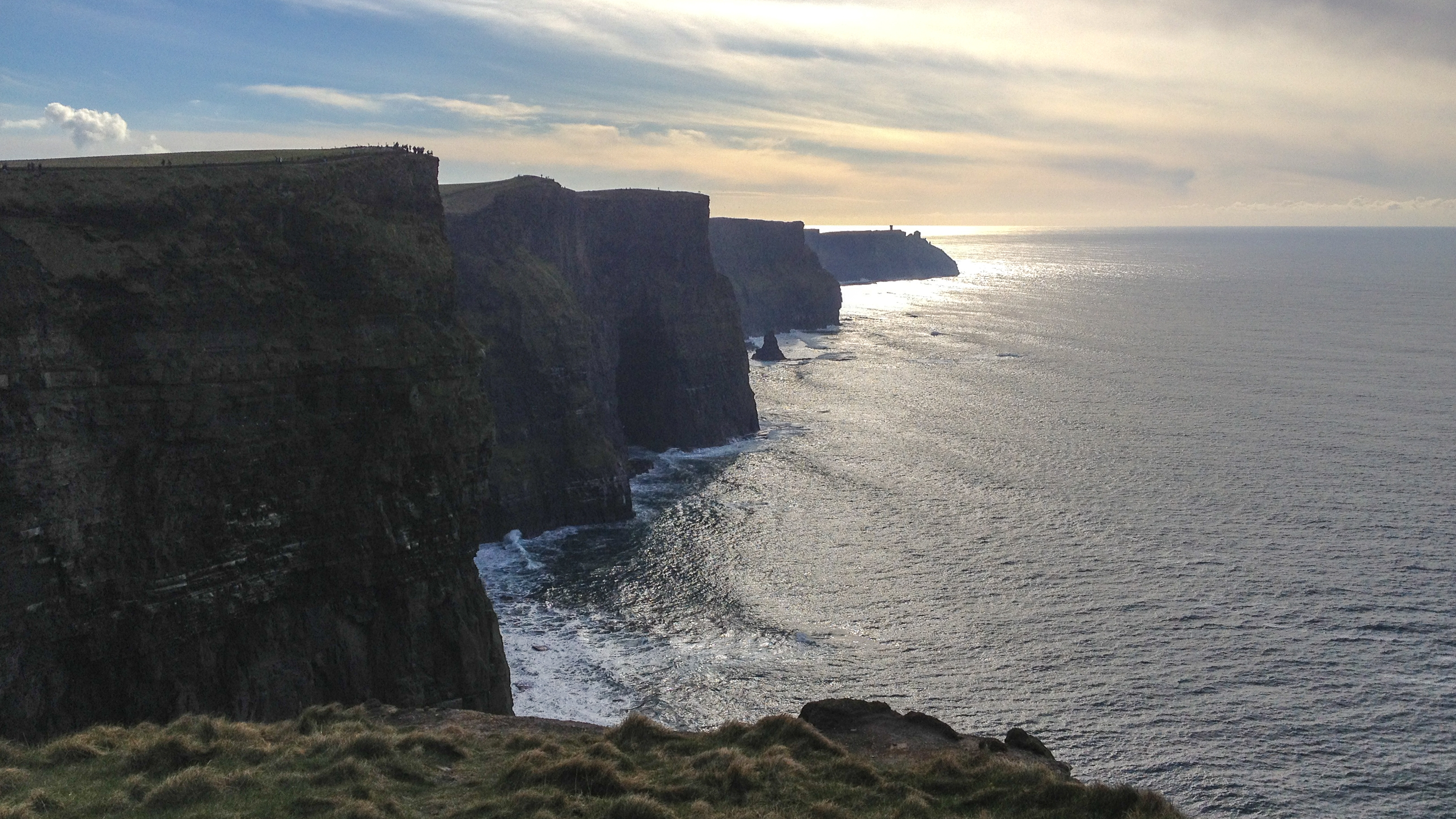
The Cliffs of Moher

Bodies of water define much of the physical boundaries of Clare. To the south-east is the River Shannon, Ireland's longest river, and to the south is the Shannon Estuary. The border to the north-east is defined by Lough Derg which is the third-largest lake in Ireland. To the west is the Atlantic Ocean, and to the north is Galway Bay. Loop Head (Irish: Ceann Léime, meaning 'leap head') is the county's westernmost point of land.

County Clare contains The Burren, a unique karst region, which contains rare flowers and fauna. At the western edge of The Burren, facing the Atlantic Ocean, are the Cliffs of Moher. The highest point in County Clare is Moylussa, 532 m (1,745 ft), in the Slieve Bernagh (Note: Not related to the Slieve Bearnagh mountain in County Down.) range in the east of the county.

The following islands lie off the coast of the county:

- Aughinish
- Inishmore (or Deer) Island
- Inishloe
- Mutton Island
- Scattery Island

== History ==
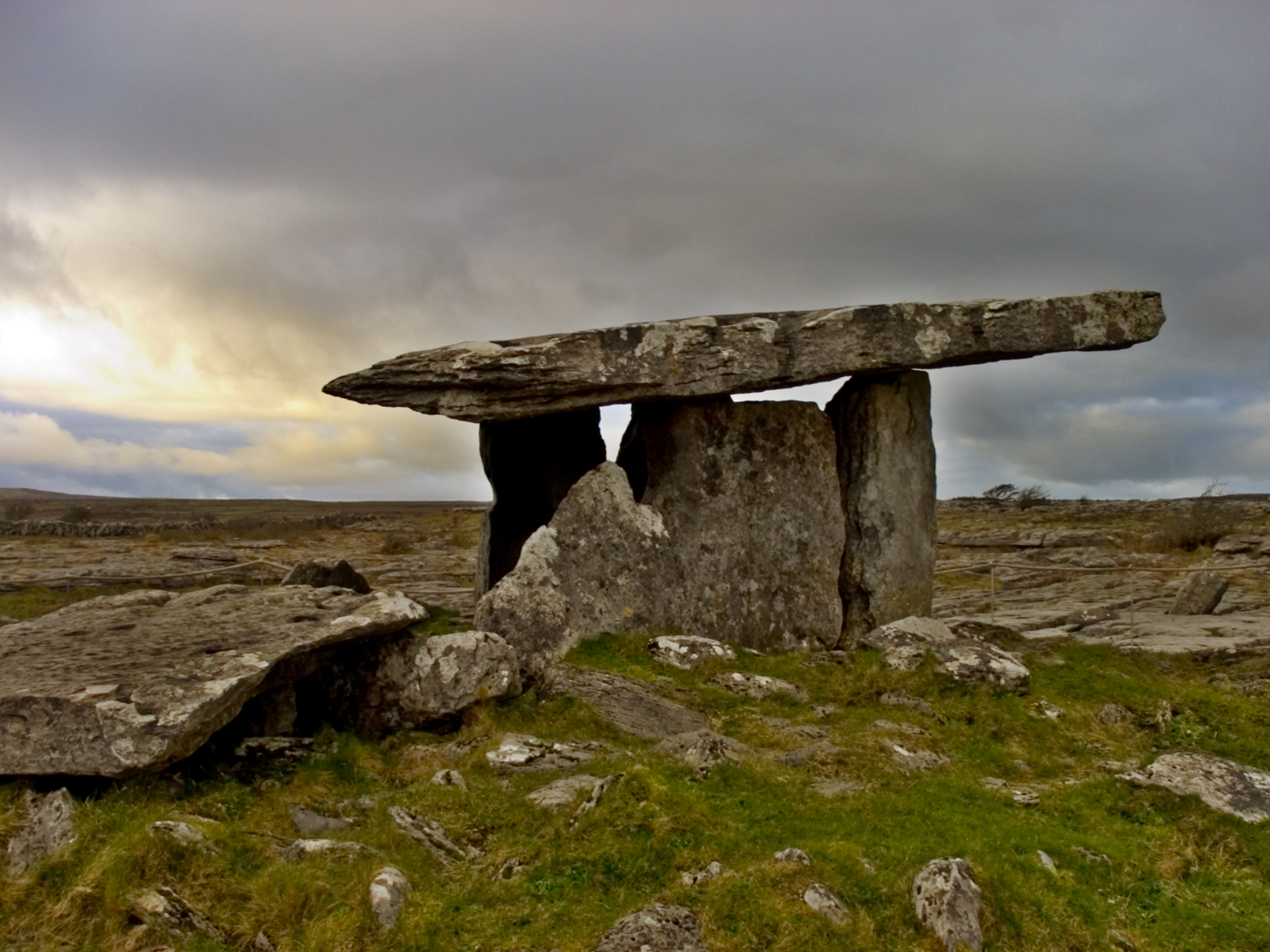
Poulnabrone dolmen in The Burren

County Clare hosts the oldest-known evidence of human activity in Ireland. The patella of a bear, which was subject to butchering close to the time of death, was found in the Alice and Gwendoline Cave, near Edenvale House, Clarecastle. The bone features a number of linear-cut marks, and has been dated to circa 10,500 BC, from the Paleolithic era. This discovery, publicized in 2017, pushed back Ireland's occupation by 2,500 years—what was previously regarded as the oldest site of occupation was the Mesolithic site of Mount Sandel, County Londonderry. This bear bone was discovered in 1903 during an archaeological excavation but was not studied until over a century later.

There was a Neolithic civilization in the Clare area—the name of the peoples is unknown, but the Prehistoric peoples left evidence behind in the form of ancient dolmen: single-chamber megalithic tombs, usually consisting of three or more upright stones. Clare is one of the richest places in Ireland for these tombs. The most noted one is in The Burren area; it is known as Poulnabrone dolmen, which translates to "hole of sorrows". The remains of the people inside the tomb have been excavated and dated to 3800 BC.

Ptolemy created a map of Ireland in his Geographia with information dating from 100 AD; it is the oldest written account of the island that includes geographical features. Within his map, Ptolemy names the Gaelic tribes inhabiting it and the areas in which they resided; in the area of Clare, he identified a tribe known as the Gangani. Historians have found the tribes on the west of Ireland the most difficult to identify with known peoples; however, historians William Camden and Charles O'Conor speculated a possible connection between the Gangani and the Concani, one of the eleven tribes in the confederacy of the Cantabri in the northern part of the Iberian Peninsula.

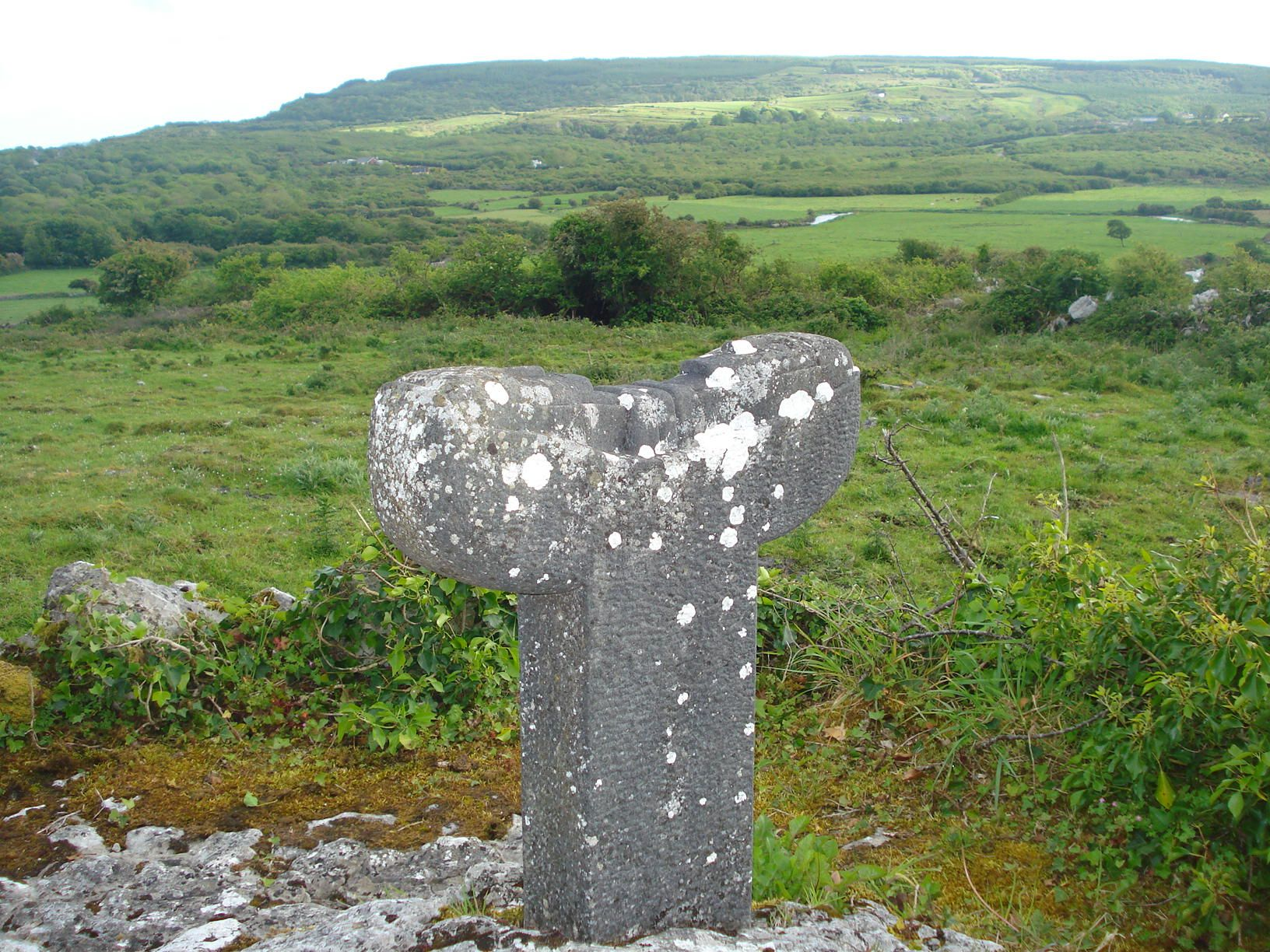
The Tau Cross at Roughan Hill, Kilnaboy, County Clare, Ireland

During the Early Middle Ages, the area was part of the Kingdom of Connacht ruled by the Uí Fiachrach Aidhne. In the Middle Ages, it was annexed to the Kingdom of Munster to be settled by the Dalcassians. It was renamed Thomond, meaning North Munster. Brian Boru became a leader from here during this period, perhaps the most noted High King of Ireland.

From 1118 onwards the Kingdom of Thomond was in place as its own petty kingdom, ruled by the O'Brien clan. After the Norman invasion of Ireland, Thomas de Clare, established the short-lived Norman lordship of Thomond. His son Richard de Clare was killed at the Battle of Dysert O'Dea in 1318 during Edward Bruce's invasion.

=== English colonization ===
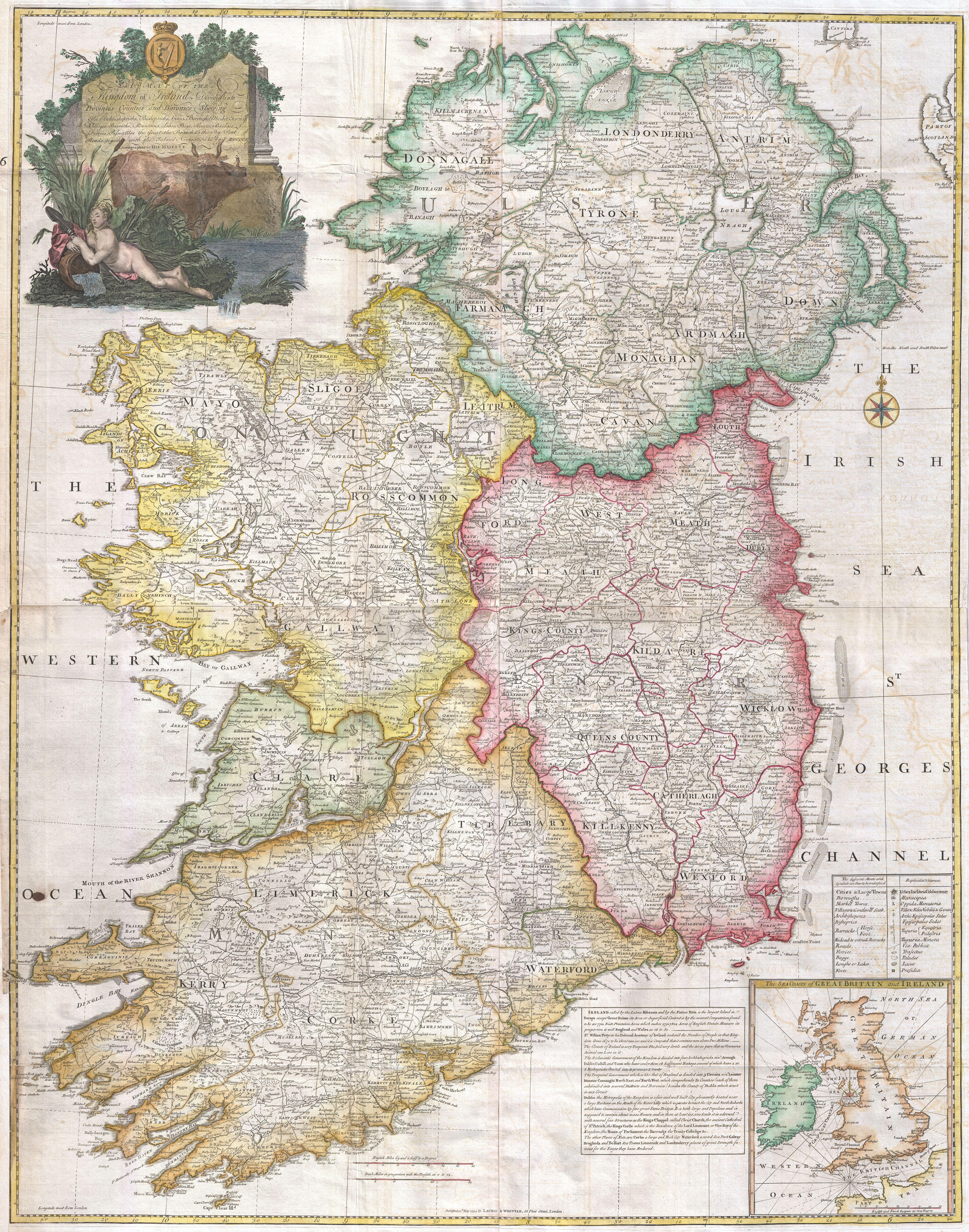
1794 map of Ireland, with County Clare coloured as neither part of Connacht nor Munster

In 1543, during the Tudor conquest of Ireland, Murrough O'Brien, by surrender and regrant to Henry VIII, became Earl of Thomond within Henry's Kingdom of Ireland. Henry Sidney as Lord Deputy of Ireland responded to the Desmond Rebellion by creating the presidency of Connaught in 1569 and presidency of Munster in 1570. He transferred Thomond from Munster to Connaught, which he shired, Thomond becoming County Clare.

About 1600, Clare was removed from the presidency of Connaught and made a presidency in its own right under the Earl of Thomond. When Henry O'Brien, 5th Earl of Thomond died in 1639, Lord Deputy Thomas Wentworth, 1st Earl of Strafford decreed Clare should return to the presidency of Munster, but the Wars of the Three Kingdoms delayed this until the Restoration of 1660.

Clare's county nickname is the Banner County, for which various origins have been suggested: the banners captured by Clare's Dragoons at the Battle of Ramillies; or the banner of Catholic emancipation raised by Daniel O'Connell's victory in the 1828 County Clare by-election that led to Parliament passing the Roman Catholic Relief Act 1829.

Scattery Island, in the Mouth of the Shannon off the Clare coast, was transferred to Limerick Corporation and the county of the city of Limerick after the dissolution of the monasteries in the mid-16th century. It was assigned to County Clare after the Municipal Corporations (Ireland) Act 1840. Under the Local Government (Ireland) Act 1898, part of the judicial county of Galway (Drummaan, Inishcaltra North and Mountshannon electoral divisions) was transferred to county Clare. This area contains the village of Mountshannon on the north-western shore of Lough Derg.

== Governance and politics ==
The island of Ireland, showing location of County Clare.

=== Local government ===
The local authority for the county is Clare County Council.

Fianna Fáil lost its overall majority on the council in 2004. As of the 2009 local election, Fianna Fáil is the largest party, with 13 of the 28 seats.

The county seat is at Ennis, which also serves as a major regional hub for County Clare. Among its emergency services, it contains the Ennis Hospital, the HQ of the Clare Divisional Garda, the Clare Fire Brigade and Civil Defence.

The council has two representatives on the Southern Regional Assembly, where it is part of the Mid-West strategic planning area.

=== Former districts ===
Prior to 2014, there were four town councils in Clare: Ennis, Kilrush, Kilkee and Shannon. All town councils in Ireland were abolished under the Local Government Reform Act 2014.

=== National politics ===
Since 1921, County Clare has been represented in Dáil Éireann by the constituency of Clare, which currently has four Teachtaí Dála (TDs). Since 2020, the whole of the county has been in the constituency. At various times, portions of County Clare have been in other constituencies: Clare–South Galway (1969–1977), Galway West (1977–1981), Limerick East (1992–2011) and Limerick City (2011–2020).

The constituency was historically a Fianna Fáil stronghold. Prominent former TDs for Clare include Éamon de Valera, who became Taoiseach and President and former president Patrick Hillery.

It is part of the European Parliament constituency of South (5 seats).

== Demography ==
Historical population
Year	Pop.	±%
1600	8,776	—
1610	12,554	+43.0%
1659	16,914	+34.7%
1821	208,089	+1130.3%
1831	258,322	+24.1%
1841	286,394	+10.9%
1851	212,440	−25.8%
1861	166,305	−21.7%
1871	147,864	−11.1%
1881	141,457	−4.3%
1891	124,483	−12.0%
1901	112,334	−9.8%
1911	104,232	−7.2%
1926	95,064	−8.8%
1936	89,879	−5.5%
1946	85,064	−5.4%
1951	81,329	−4.4%
1956	77,176	−5.1%
1961	73,702	−4.5%
1966	73,597	−0.1%
1971	75,008	+1.9%
1979	84,919	+13.2%
1981	87,567	+3.1%
1986	91,344	+4.3%
1991	90,918	−0.5%
1996	94,006	+3.4%
2002	103,277	+9.9%
2006	110,950	+7.4%
2011	117,196	+5.6%
2016	118,817	+1.4%
2022	127,419	+7.2%

The population of Clare was 127,419 people at the 2022 census. The main urban areas are Ennis with a population of 27,923 and Shannon with 10,256.

The demographic profile for Clare in general is fairly young: 22% are under age 14, while 12% are over 65, compared to the national average of 20% and 11%, respectively. There is a slightly higher percentage of males with 50.5%, while females number 49.5%.

English is the main language spoken in Clare. The vast majority of the population are Irish people, accounting for 86%. Most immigrants are Europeans, totalling an additional 7,520; there is also a small African minority of 1,124 people, while other ethnic groups are very small in number.

In addition, Clare had a large diaspora due to vast emigration during the 19th century. There are millions of people around the world who can trace their family background to Clare; such descendants are found mostly in North America, Great Britain, Australia, South Africa, Argentina and New Zealand. Many people from the Irish diaspora visit the Clare area to trace their family roots and background.

Most of the names in Clare are derived from sept members of the Dalcassian race of Gaels or septs of Thomond. Some of the most common examples are O'Brien, O'Gorman, O'Dea, McMahon, McInerney, McNamara, McGarry, Moloney, O'Grady, Hogan, Considine, Griffey/Griffin and Lynch. Names of assimilated Norman origin include Burke, Dalton, and Comyn.

== Religion ==
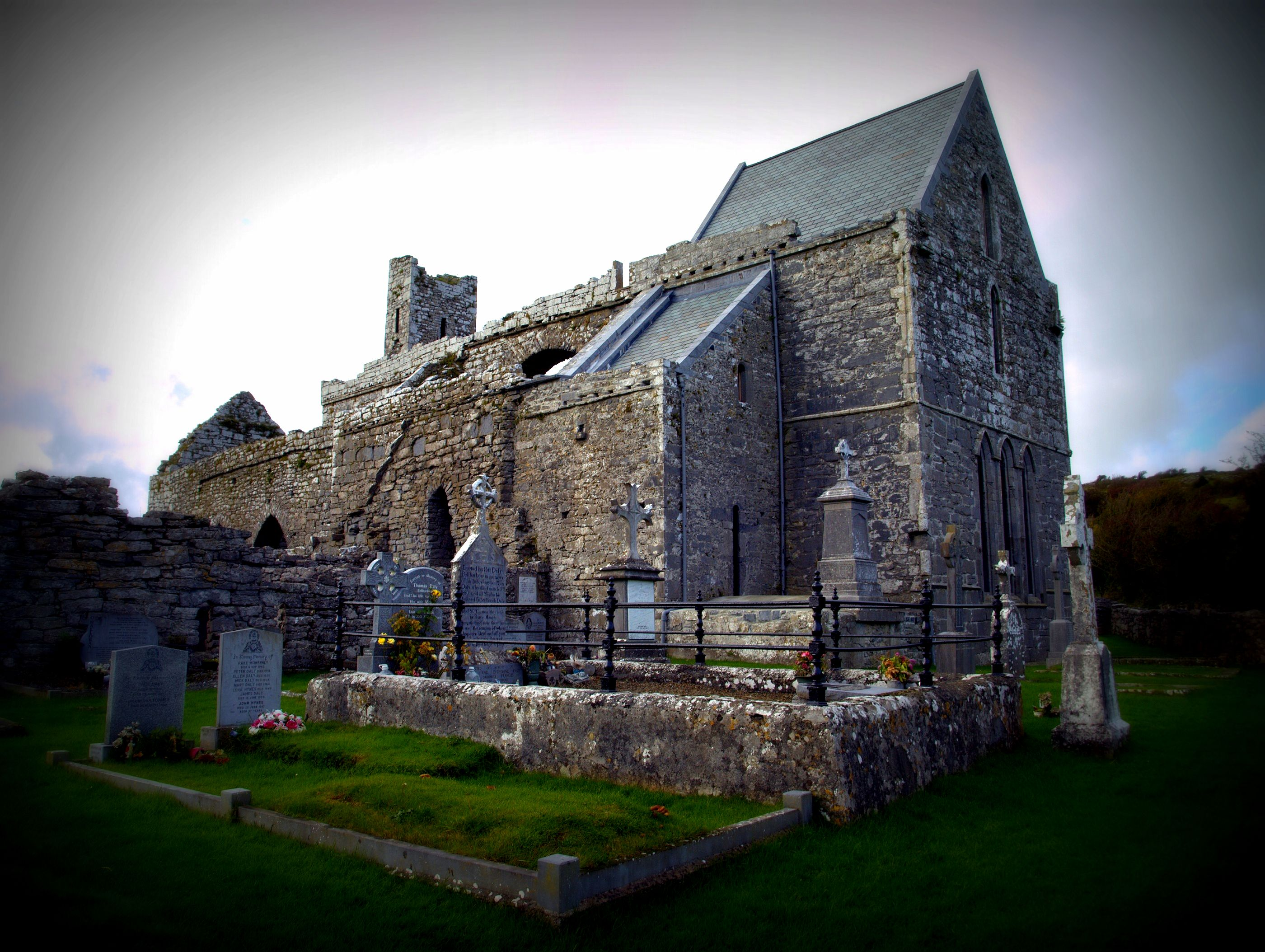
Corcomroe Abbey

The great majority of the population follow Christianity; at least 92% of the people in the area polled as part of the Ireland Census 2006 identified as Christians. There are numerous abbeys and priories in Clare. Some of the ruins of such structures, such as Scattery Island, Bishop's Island, and Drumcliff monasteries, are ancient, dating to the sixth century when Christianity was first introduced to Ireland. The former was founded by Saint Senan, who was born locally near Kilrush in 488 and is counted amongst the Twelve Apostles of Ireland.

Numerous other saints came from Clare, such as Flannan, Mochulleus, Moula, Caimin, Maccreiche, Munchin and more. In the present day, the Catholic Church still commands a large majority, with 88% of the populace declaring themselves as followers of the religion. This percentage is slightly higher than the national average.

Killaloe Diocese

Most of Clare falls under the Catholic Diocese of Killaloe, which is part of the ecclesiastical province of Cashel and Emly. The Bishop of Killaloe is seated at the St Peter and Paul Cathedral in Ennis. A small portion of the north-western part of Clare falls under the Diocese of Galway, Kilmacduagh and Kilfenora.

As part of the local council's architectural conservation project, around eighty Christian churches have been designated as protected structures. Among the more notable structures are the ruins of Corcomroe Abbey, Quin Abbey and Dysert O'Dea Monastery.

The largest religious minority is the Church of Ireland, which is part of the Anglican Communion. It has just under 2,000 adherents in Clare. The county is part of the Diocese of Limerick and Killaloe, one of the three cathedrals of the diocese being St Flannan's Cathedral in Killaloe. Other religious communities in Clare are very small in comparison. In 2016, about 11% of the population reported no religion. Up from 5% in 2011

== Places of interest ==
Places of interest include:

- Cliffs of Moher
- Doolin
- Inis Cealtra (Holy Island) in Lough Derg
- Kilbaha
- Kilkee
- Loop Head
- Scattery Island
- Spanish Point
- The Burren
- Bunratty Castle

== Gaeltacht ==
West Clare and some pockets in East Clare were recognised as part of the Gaeltacht, or Irish-speaking area, by the Irish Free State government in the original Coimisiún na Gaeltachta in 1926. The most prominent of these areas with native Irish language speakers were west of Ennis in Kilmihil, Kilrush, Doonbeg, Doolin, Ennistimon, Carrigaholt, Lisdoonvarna and Ballyvaughan.

The last remaining native speaker in Stonehall, next to Shannon, was alive in the 1930s; in the 1870s, the region had been entirely Irish speaking.

By the time of the second Coimisiún na Gaeltachta in 1956, the decline in the number of Gaelic speakers had been such that West Clare was removed from the list. It remained covered by the Gaeltacht (Housing) Acts until 2001.

Close geographic proximity to the Aran Islands (which were once part of Thomond) and local trade with fishermen from there meant that the language was used by residents of Fanore, Murroogh, Doolin and Quilty more than in other places. The last native Clare Irish speaker, the seanchaí Paddy Pháraic Mhíchíl Ó Sionáin (Shannon) of Fisherstreet, Doolin, died in the early 1990s.

In the early 21st century, the pressure group Coiste Forbartha Gaeltachta Chontae an Chláir sought to restore the official status of West Clare as a Gaeltacht area. They are encouraging immersion classes to revive use of the language.

== Music ==
County Clare has a strong history of Traditional music. It is the home of the Kilfenora Céilí Band, the Tulla Céilí Band, Stockton's Wing, Elizabeth Crotty, Sharon Shannon, Noel Hill, Peadar O'Loughlin, Martin Hayes and legendary tin-whistler Micho Russell. Ennis in County Clare is also the birthplace of Grammy-nominated singer Maura O'Connell whose grandmother started a fish market in the town. The county has many traditional music festivals and one of the most well known is the Willie Clancy Summer School, which is held every July in the town of Milltown Malbay in memory of the renowned uilleann piper, Willie Clancy.

Andy Irvine has written two songs celebrating County Clare: one is "West Coast of Clare" (recorded with Planxty in 1973), in which he mentions Spanish Point and Milltown Malbay. The other is "My Heart's Tonight in Ireland" (recorded on his solo album Rain on the Roof in 1996, and again on Changing Trains in 2005), in which he mentions several towns and villages in County Clare: Milltown Malbay, Scariff, Kilrush, Sixmilebridge, Kilkishen, Lahinch, Ennistymon, Liscannor and Kilkee, and also makes two references to the music of Willie Clancy:

In the town of Scarriff the sun was shining in the sky
When Willie Clancy played his pipes and the tears welled in my eyes
Many years have passed and gone since the time we had there
But my heart's tonight in Ireland in the sweet County Clare.
...
Lahinch and Ennistymon, Liscannor and Kilkee
But best of all was Milltown when the music flowed so free
Willie Clancy and the County Clare I'm ever in your debt
For the sights and sounds of yesterday are shining memories yet.

Milltown Malbay is home to Oidhreacht an Chlair, an institute for higher education in all aspects of Irish tradition, history and literature.

== Sport ==
The Clare hurling team has one of the best records of success in the country in recent years with many cups such as the Liam MacCarthy Cup having been won in 1914, 1995, 1997, 2013, and 2024, and also finalists in 2002. Clare won the Munster Final in football in 1992 beating Kerry. There is a strong Gaelic Athletic Association (GAA) presence in County Clare with the founder of the GAA, Michael Cusack, having been born in Carron which is situated in the heart of The Burren in North Clare.

== Transport ==
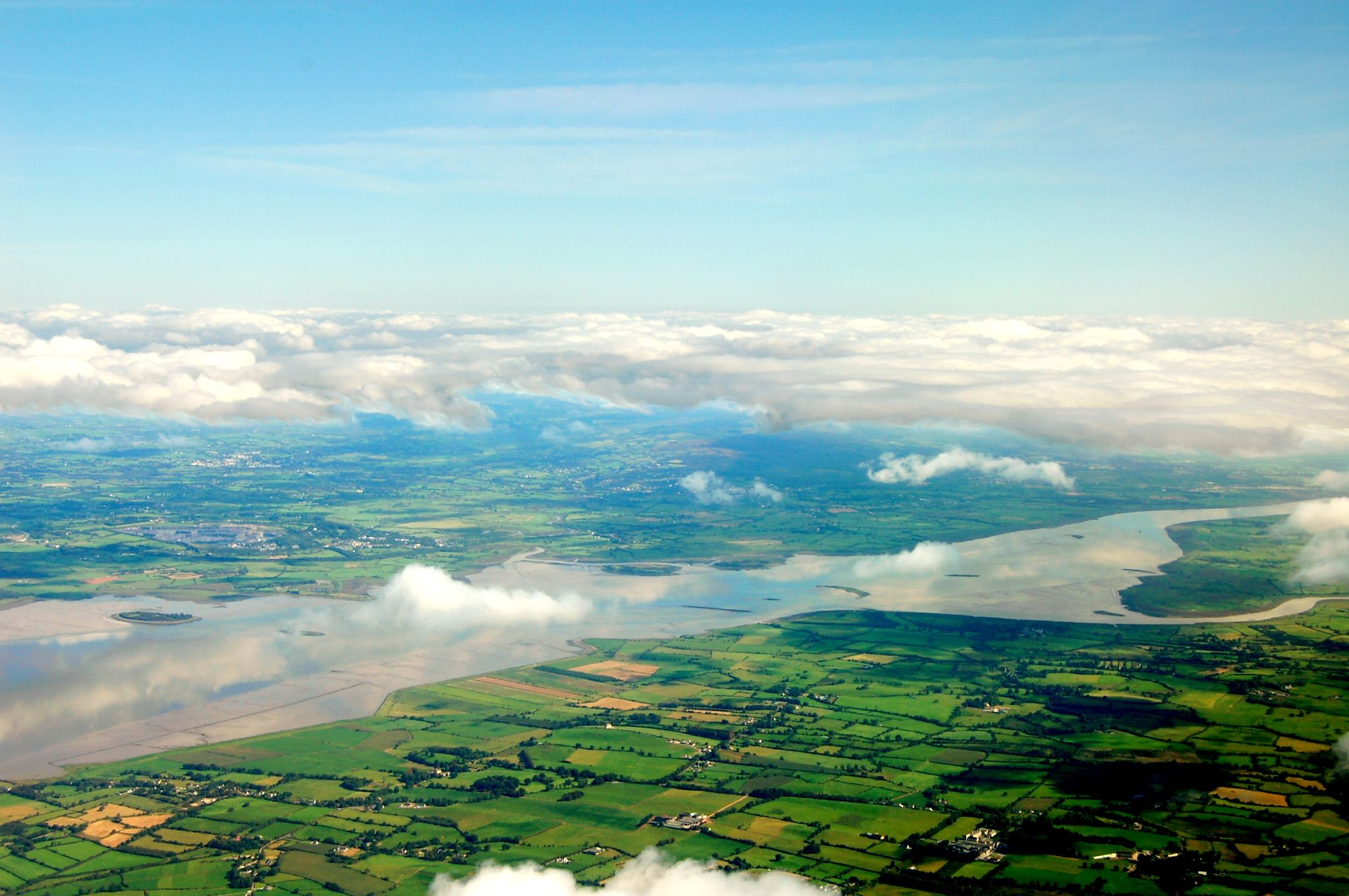
View from aircraft as it comes down to land at Shannon Airport

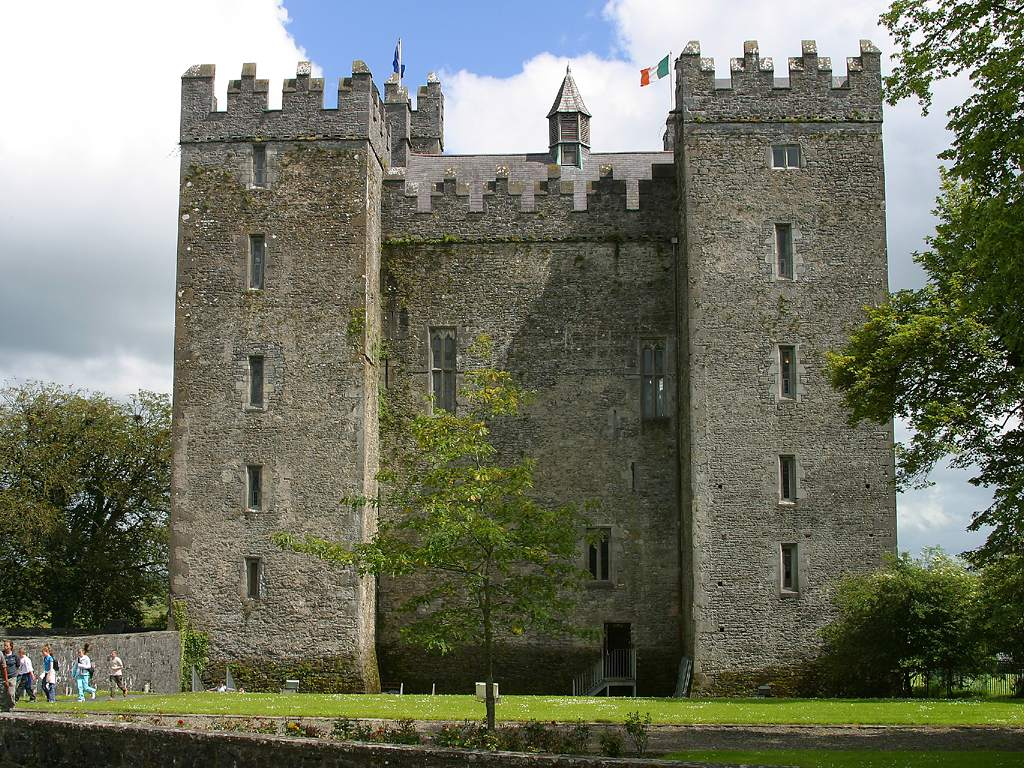
Bunratty Castle

Clare is served by two national primary roads—a classification referring to the major routes between major urban centres in Ireland. This includes the N18 connecting Limerick to Galway, which passes through Ennis and by route of the N19—Shannon. These two roads are part of the wider Western and Southern Corridor connecting many of the major settlements right across the island in these areas. There are also some significant national secondary roads—across the coast, stretching from Ballyvaughan, through Ennistymon and Kilkee, before arriving at Kilrush is the N67. In addition to this the N68 connects Kilrush to Ennis, while Ennis is connected to Ennistymon via the N85.

Mainland public transport is mostly limited to buses ran by Irish Government owned company Bus Éireann; there are around 25 buses running frequent routes which pass through the majority of large settlements in Clare. Clare Bus, runs a limited number of "accessible buslines". The Ennis railway station operated by government-owned Iarnród Éireann is the most significant railway station in Clare today; it was opened on 2 July 1859. By route of Limerick the trains run from Ennis to Dublin and it generally takes 3 hours to complete the journey. There was previously a far more extensive local railway network in Clare, laid while part of the United Kingdom, the West Clare Railway was in existence from its opening in 1887 by Charles Stewart Parnell until 1961 covering much of the county. It was quite inefficient, however, leading Percy French to write the song Are Ye Right There Michael? about his experience. Much of it was dug up and dismantled by the Irish government from the 1950s to the 1970s after being deemed uneconomic; however, there remains local advocacy groups who wish to conserve and restore parts of it.

The third-busiest airport in Ireland is located in Clare with the Shannon Airport, which officially opened in 1945. Along with Dublin Airport and Cork Airport it is one of the three primary airports in the country, handling 3.62 million passengers in 2007. Shannon was the first airport in Ireland to receive transatlantic flights. Ryanair is the main airline handling flights with Great Britain and Continental European countries such as Spain, France and Germany as the primary destinations. Much traffic from the United States is received, which Aer Lingus mostly handles; it is sometimes used as a military stopover which has caused some controversy in the country, but nonetheless has generated significant revenue for the airport. There are some local ferry services as much of the county is surrounded by water; there is one from Killimer to Tarbert Island in Kerry and also from Doolin to the Aran Islands of Inisheer and Inishmore.

== People ==
- Gerald Barry, composer
- Pat Breen
- Joe Carey
- Tony Killeen
- Timmy Dooley
- Síle De Valera
- Shane O'Donnell
- Naomi Carroll
- Edna O'Brien
- Brendan O'Regan
- Des Lynam

== See also ==
- High Sheriff of Clare
- I Was Happy Here
- List of rivers of County Clare
- Lord Lieutenant of Clare
- Wild Atlantic Way

== Bibliography ==
- Anthon, Charles (1855). A Classical Dictionary. Harvard University.
- O'Laughlin, Michael C. (2000). The Families of County Clare, Ireland. Irish Roots Cafe. ISBN 0-940134-98-5.
- The Four Masters (2003). "The Annals of Ireland by the Four Masters" as translated by Owen Connellan. Irish Roots Cafe. ISBN 0-940134-14-4.
