= Fanningstown =

Fanningstown Baile an Fhainínigh
- Townland
- Location in Ireland
- Coordinates: 52°34′09″N 8°36′33″W
- Country: Ireland
- Province: Munster
- County: County Limerick

Area
  - Total: 4.25 km^{2} (1.64 sq mi)
- Time zone: UTC+0 (WET)
  - Summer (DST): UTC-1 (IST (WEST))

Fanningstown is a townland in the parish of Fedamore, in County Limerick, Ireland.

Neighbouring townlands include Garryellen to the west, Carnane, Arywee and Williamstown to the east, Friarstown North to the north, and Gortgarralt to the south.

It has an area of approximately 425 hectares (1,050 acres). It is located 11.7 km (7.3 mi) distance by road from Limerick city centre, in a southern direction.

The name is a direct translation from the Irish language "Baile an Fhainínigh".

Residents of Fanningstown entitled to vote may do so for candidates in the Adare Local Electoral Area for local elections, the Limerick County for general elections, South constituency for European Parliament elections. The polling station for these elections is in Fedamore National School.
