= N18 road (Ireland) =

National primary road in Ireland

N18 road
- Bóthar N18

Route information
- Part of
- Length: 98.47 km (61.19 mi)

Location
- Country: Ireland
- Primary destinations: (bypassed routes in italics): County Limerick; Limerick City; Crosses River Shannon via Limerick Tunnel; County Clare; Cratloe; Sixmilebridge; Bunratty; Shannon; Shannon Airport (via N19); Newmarket on Fergus; Clarecastle; Ennis; Barefield; Crusheen; County Galway; Gort; Ardrahan; Kilcolgan; Clarinbridge; Oranmore; Terminates at M17 near Claregalway

Highway system
- Roads in Ireland; Motorways; Primary; Secondary; Regional

The N18 road is a national primary road in Ireland, connecting the cities of Limerick and Galway. Ennis and Gort are two major towns on the route, and Shannon Airport is reached via the connecting N19. The west coast route continues on to Sligo as the N17. The section from Limerick to the N19 junction forms part of European route E20, and the entire route is part of the proposed Atlantic Corridor. The section of motorway from Shannon to Claregalway is designated the M18 motorway. The tolled Limerick Tunnel forms part of the route.

== Route ==
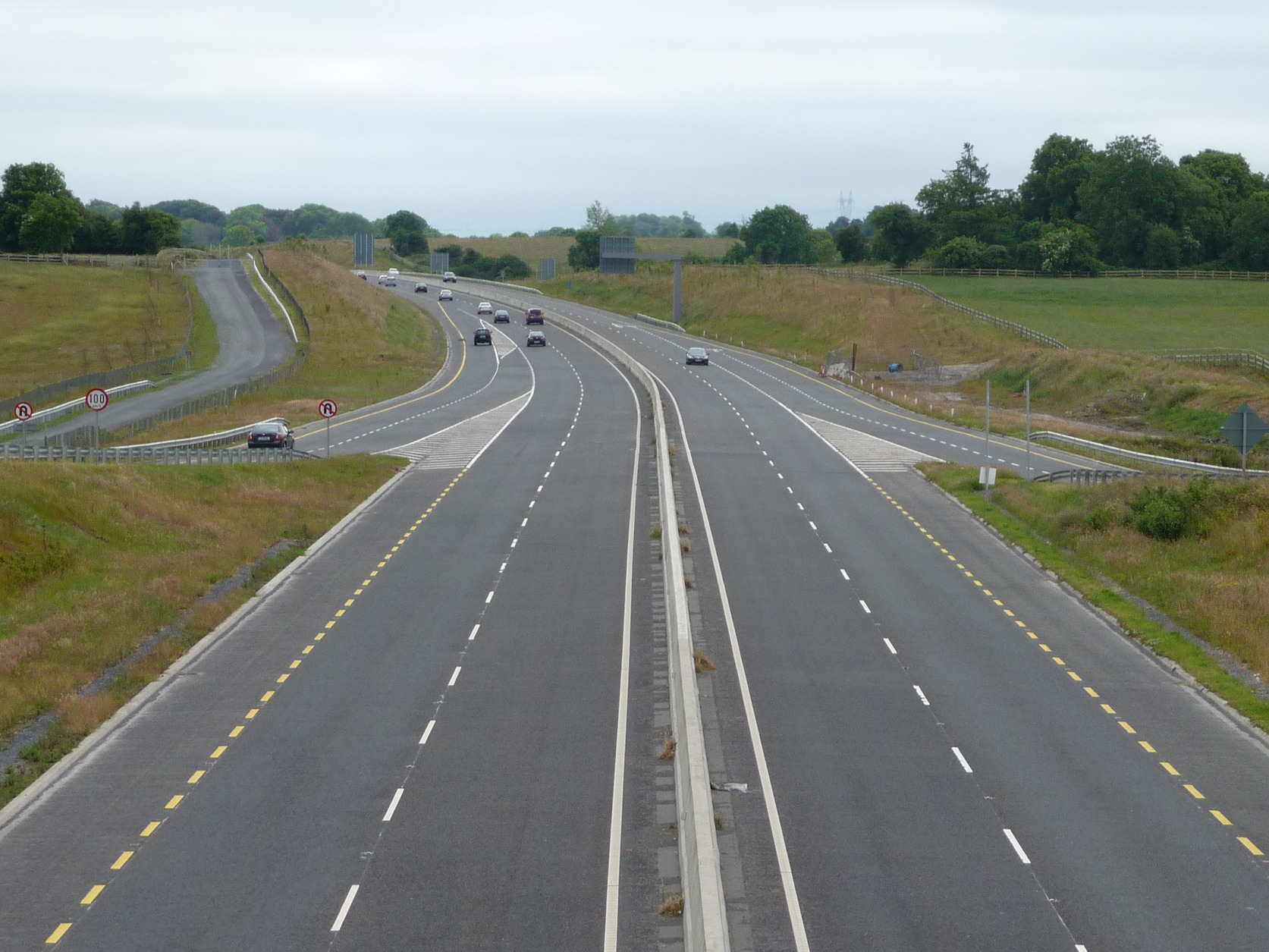
Looking south from the Ennis junction flyover. This section of HQDC was redesignated as motorway, effective 28 August 2009.

=== N18 Limerick to Shannon ===
As of 27 July 2010, the N18 commences at the Rosbrien interchange, a major interchange south of Limerick city, where it joins the M7 motorway to Dublin and M20 motorway towards Cork and Tralee. The dual carriageway continues north, intersecting with the N69 road, before crossing under the River Shannon using the Limerick Tunnel, this section of the route forms phase II of the Limerick Southern Ring Road and is tolled between junctions 2-4. North of the River Shannon the N18 continues as dual-carriageway bypassing Cratloe, Sixmilebridge and Bunratty. The road passed alongside Bunratty Castle before the completion of the neighbouring dual-carriageway section in the late 1980s/early 1990s. The other nearby junctions were also converted to fly-overs in the 1990s.

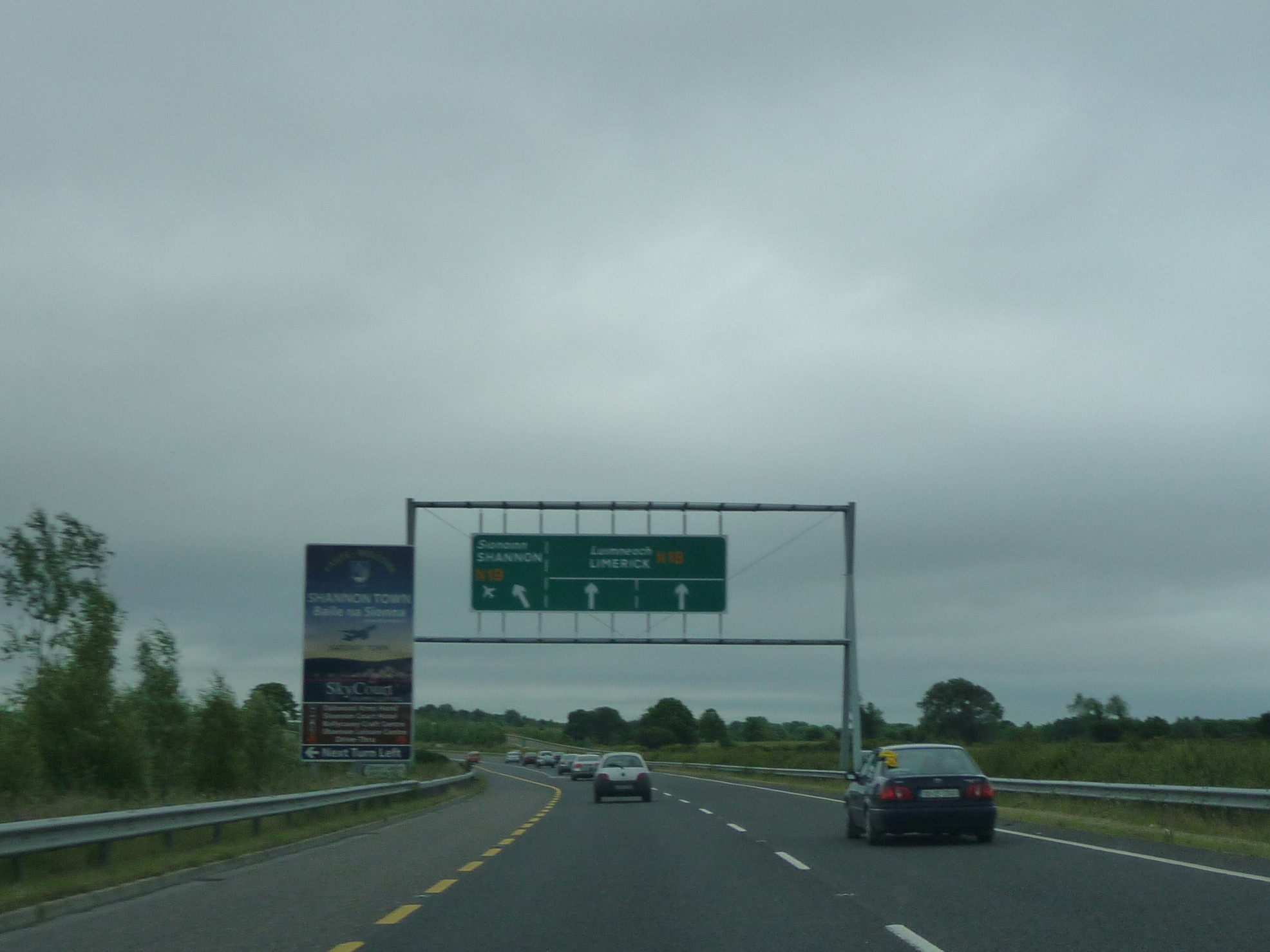
Travelling southbound on the N18 near the Shannon Town/Airport exit

The road continues north with junctions at Hurler's Cross and Shannon Town, there is a fly-over connecting Shannon Airport via the N19 dual-carriageway.

=== M18 Shannon to Gort ===
The N18 continues north of the N19 junction where motorway regulations are enforced and the N18 route is designated as the M18 bypassing the towns of Newmarket-on-Fergus, Ennis and Gort. The motorway used to end at Gort, where the route would continue as a single carriageway through County Galway. The dual-carriageway between Shannon and Ennis (including the Ennis bypass) was included in the second tranche of motorway redesignations and gained motorway status on 28 August 2009.

=== M18 Gort to Claregalway ===
The Gort to Tuam (M18/M17) scheme consists of 53.2 km (33.1 mi) of motorway and 4.2 km (2.6 mi) of Type 2 dual-carriageway. DirectRoute (Tuam) Ltd., a consortium consisting of Marguerite Fund, InfraRed Capital Partners, Sisk Group, Lagan Construction Group, Roadbridge and Strabag began construction of the scheme in 2015 and was officially opened on 27 September 2017.

It completed the existing M18 motorway, bypassing the towns of Kilcolgan and Oranmore. The route then continues north to the M6 Dublin–Galway motorway, forming interchange junction 19 on the M6. It then continues northwards bypassing Claregalway. The M18 had terminated at a temporary junction near Gort. In addition, a new section of the N17 was constructed as motorway. This motorway begins at a new junction with the M6 near Athenry, and ends with a dual-carriageway bypass of Tuam, which was also constructed as part of the scheme but was not designated a motorway. The N17 then continues into County Mayo towards Sligo.

== History ==
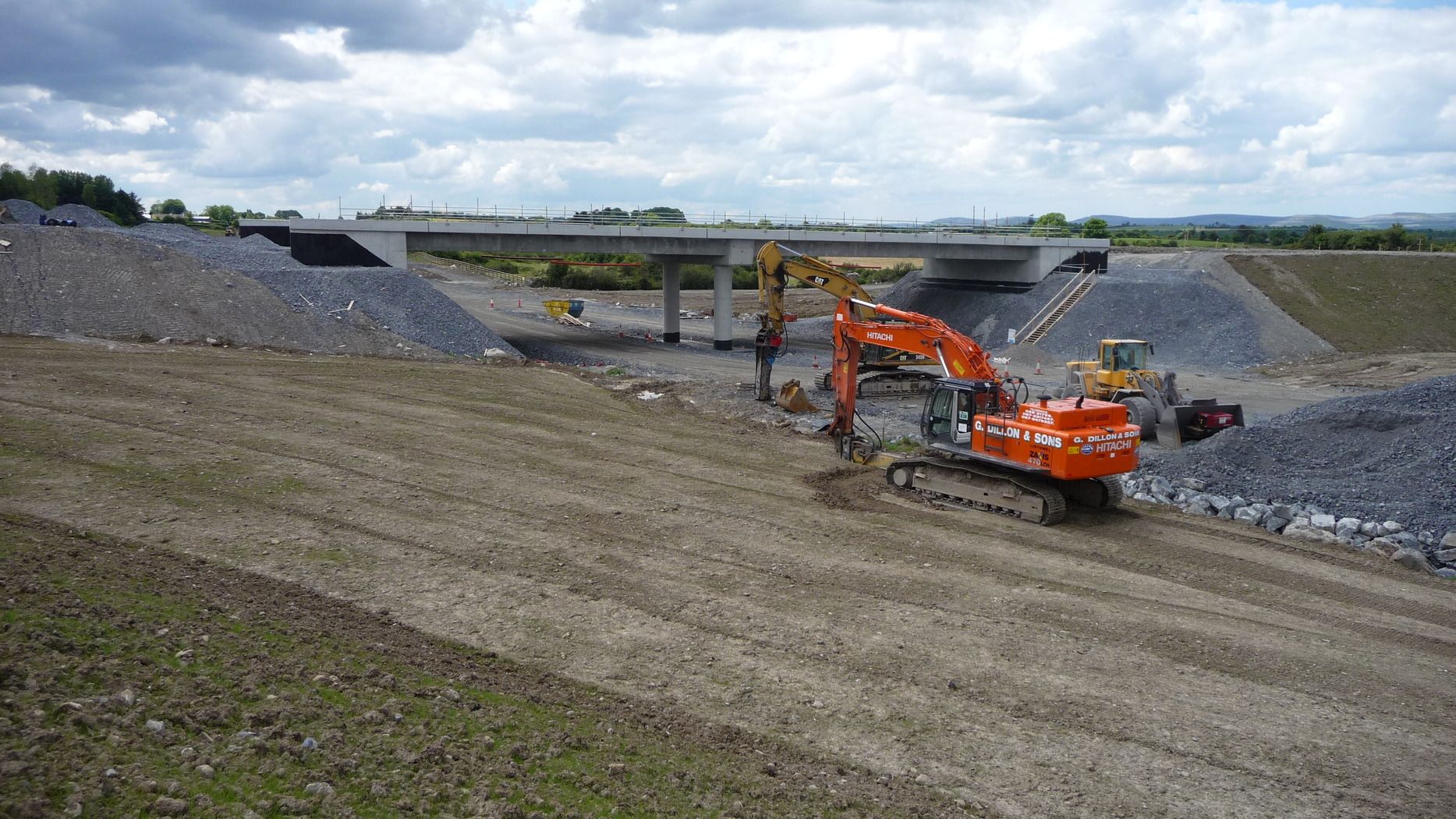
Gort-Crusheen under construction (June 2009): The grade separated junction at Gort.

Major improvements to the N18 route were made in the 2000s and 2010s. Originally the route was a narrow single carriageway route that ran through all the main towns and villages between Limerick and Claregalway where the route terminates. The first improvements involved the dualling of the Limerick, Bunratty and Shannon route. The Newmarket-on-Fergus bypass opened in December 2002 and the Ennis bypass opened in 2007. Both were redesignated as motorway in August 2009. The Limerick Tunnel and phase II of the Limerick Southern Ring Road opened in July 2010 forming a continuous motorway dual-carriageway from the N/M18 to the M7 and M20 outside Limerick. On 12 November 2010 the €207 million Gort to Crusheen (M18) bypass was opened. The remaining single carriageway sections from Gort to Claregalway have been upgraded to motorway standard and were officially opened on 27 September 2017.

== Junctions ==
Junctions 9-18 form part of the M18 motorway.

County	km	mi	Junction	Destinations	Notes
County Limerick
County Limerick	100	62.1	1	M20 ‒ Cork, Tralee (N21) R509 – Limerick city centre, Roxborough	Continues as M7 motorway.
County Limerick	96.5	59.9	2	N69 ‒ Listowel R509 – Limerick city centre	Foynes, Raheen, Raheen Business Park, Regional Hospital
County Limerick	95	59	Limerick Tunnel		
County Limerick	94.5	58.7	3	R527 – Limerick (West), Caherdavin	Northbound exit and southbound entrance only. Tolled.
County Limerick	93	57.8	Limerick Tunnel Toll		
County Clare	91	56.5	4	R445 – Limerick city centre, Caherdavin	Northbound entrance and southbound exit only.
County Clare	89	55.3	5	R462 – Sixmilebridge, Cratloe, Portdrine	Sixmilebridge is not shown heading southbound.
County Clare	88	54.6		L3116	LILO junction. Southbound entrance and exit only. Leads to R462 road.
County Clare	87	54		L3118 – Ballymorris	
County Clare	84.5	52.5	6a	L3126 ‒ Bunratty	Southbound entrance and exit only.
County Clare	83	51.5	6	L3122 ‒ Bunratty	
County Clare	81.5	50.6	7	R471 ‒ Sixmilebridge, Hurlers Cross	Shannon Town shown heading southbound.
County Clare	81	50.3	49.7	L3198 – Hurlers Cross	Northbound exit only.
County Clare	80	49.7	8	R471 ‒ Shannon Town, Ballycasey	Northbound entrance and exit only.
County Clare	78.5	48.7	9	N19 ‒ Shannon Town, Shannon Airport	Continues as M18 motorway.
1.000 mi = 1.609 km; 1.000 km = 0.621 mi: Incomplete access; Tolled; Route transition

== See also ==
- Roads in Ireland
- Motorways in Ireland
- National secondary road
- Regional road
