= Baile Liam =

Baile Liam or Baile Uilliam is the Irish for "William's town" and may refer to several places in Ireland:

- Ballywilliam, County Wexford, a village
- Ballywilliam, County Galway, a village near An Spidéal
- Williamstown, County Galway, a village
- Williamstown, County Limerick, a townland
