= Hurler =

Hurler or Hurlers may refer to:

- someone who hurls, especially
  - a player of hurling, Irish stick-and-ball sport
  - a pitcher in baseball
- Hurler (roller coaster), name of a roller coaster found at Carowinds and formerly Kings Dominion amusement park in the United States
- Hurler syndrome, genetic disorder also known as mucopolysaccharidosis type I (MPS I), Hurler's disease, or gargoylism
- The Hurlers (stone circles), prehistoric monument in Cornwall, UK

== See also ==
- Hurlers Cross, village in County Clare, Ireland
- Hurler–Scheie syndrome or mucopolysaccharidosis type I H-S
- Pseudo-Hurler polydystrophy, or mucolipidosis III (ML III)
