= R511 =

R511 may refer to:

- R.511, a French air-to-air missile
- R511 (South Africa), a road
- R511 road (Ireland)
