= European route E20 =

Road in trans-European E-road network

E20

Section 1
- West end: N19 in Shannon Airport, Ireland
- Major intersections: N19 in Shannon, Ireland; E201 in Borris-in-Ossory, Ireland
- East end: Dublin, Ireland

Section 2
- West end: Liverpool, United Kingdom
- Major intersections: E5 / E22 Manchester, United Kingdom; E15 / E22 Manchester, United Kingdom
- East end: Kingston-upon-Hull, United Kingdom

Section 3
- West end: Esbjerg, Denmark
- Major intersections: E45 in Kolding, Denmark; E47 / E55 from Køge to København, Denmark; E6 / E22 / E65 in Malmö, Sweden; E4 in Helsingborg, Sweden; E6 / E45 in Gothenburg, Sweden; E18 from Örebro to Arboga, Sweden; E4 in Södertälje, Sweden
- East end: E4 in Stockholm, Sweden

Section 4
- West end: E67 in Tallinn, Estonia
- Major intersections: E67 / E263 / E265 in Tallinn, Estonia; E264 in Jõhvi, Estonia; A 180 in Ivangorod, Russia
- East end: Saint Petersburg, Russia

Location
- Countries: Ireland, United Kingdom, Denmark, Sweden, Estonia, Russia

Highway system
- International E-road network; A Class; B Class
← E19	→ E21

European route E20 is a part of the United Nations International E-road network. It runs roughly west–east from Shannon Airport, Ireland to Saint Petersburg, Russia.

Its length is 1,880 km (1,170 mi) but it is not continuous; at three points, a sea crossing is required. Roll-on/roll-off ferries make the crossings between Dublin and Liverpool as well as between Stockholm and Tallinn. No publicly accessible ferries traverse the North Sea from Kingston-upon-Hull to Esbjerg (as of 2019), but a ferry for commercial drivers runs between Immingham and Esbjerg on most days.

== Route description ==
=== Republic of Ireland ===
The initial section of the E20 from Shannon Airport to Dublin via Limerick is approximately 228 kilometres (142 miles) long and is only partially signed, along the M7/N7. The section from Shannon Airport to east of Limerick is mainly dual carriageway, with a short section of motorway as part of the Limerick Southern Ring Road. The Shannon Tunnel, opened on 16 July 2010, completed the bypass of Limerick. The section from Limerick to Naas is motorway (M7), and the final section from Naas to Dublin is dual carriageway (N7). A ferry must be used from Dublin to Holyhead, to access Liverpool.

=== United Kingdom ===
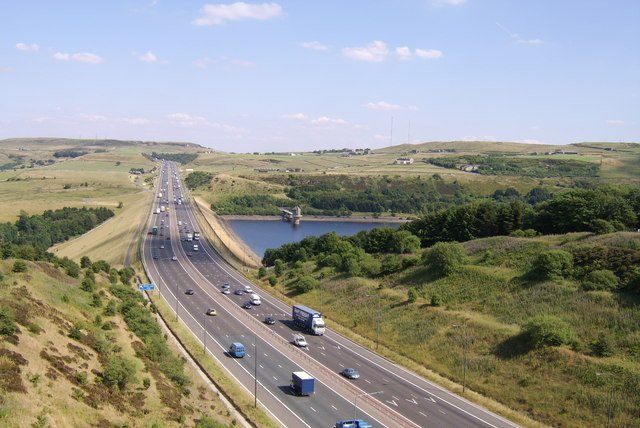
The M62 passes Scammonden Reservoir in West Yorkshire

E20 follows the A5080 from Liverpool to Huyton, the M62 and M60 from Huyton to South Cave, and the A63 from South Cave to Kingston upon Hull. The route length across the UK is 205 kilometres (127 mi) in total but is not signposted.

There are no ferries between Kingston upon Hull and Esbjerg. Alternative ferries were once available from Immingham, which is 48 kilometres (30 mi) from Kingston upon Hull, and Harwich, which is 350 kilometres (220 mi) from Kingston upon Hull. There are no longer any passenger routes operating between the UK and Scandinavia.

The closest alternative is to take the Eurotunnel Shuttle from Cheriton (Folkestone) to Calais, or take a ferry from Harwich to Hook of Holland. Both of these routes would require a detour of around 900 miles (940 miles to Esbjerg, as this route would require you to drive along the E20 to reach Esbjerg).

=== Denmark and Sweden ===
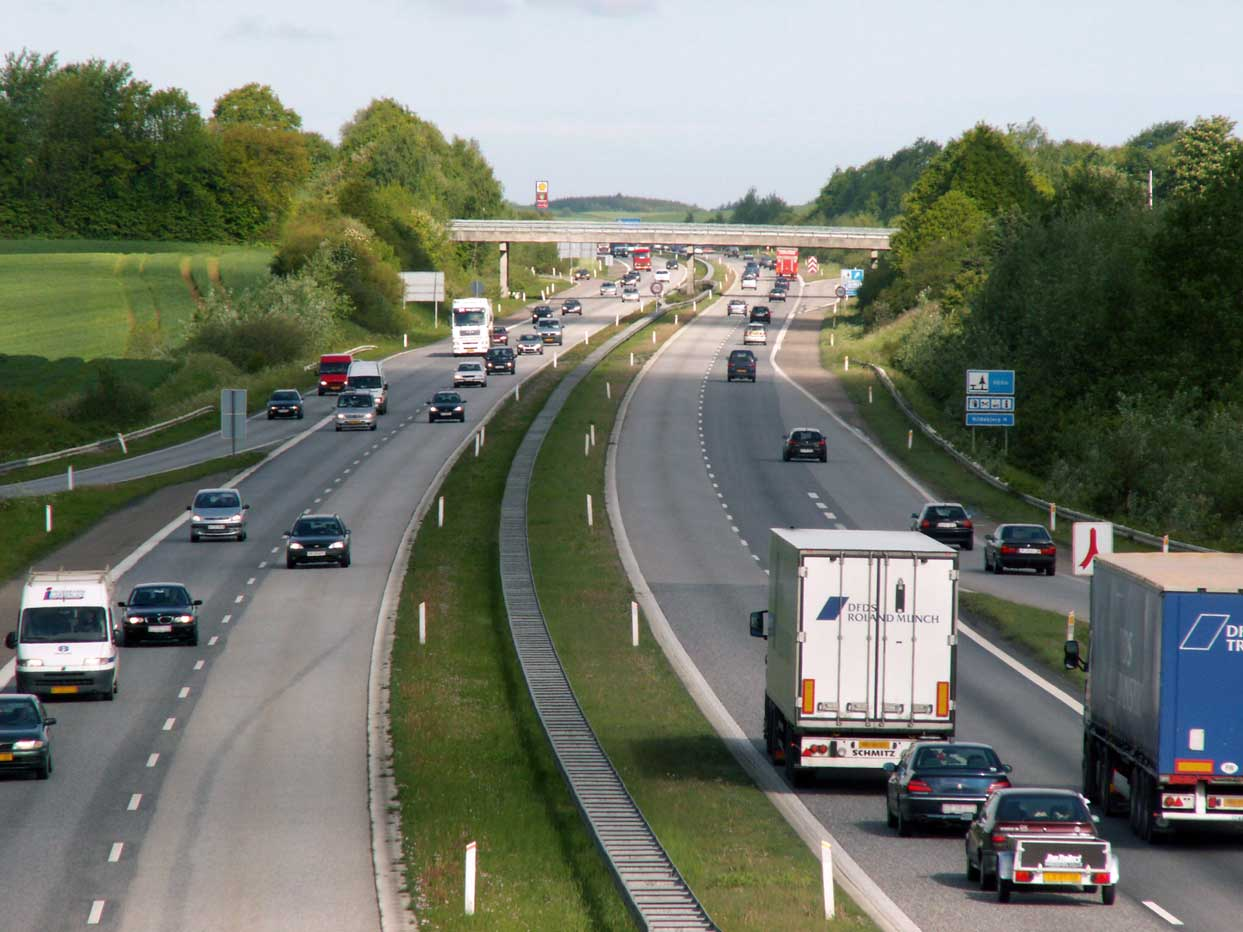
E 20 near Odense

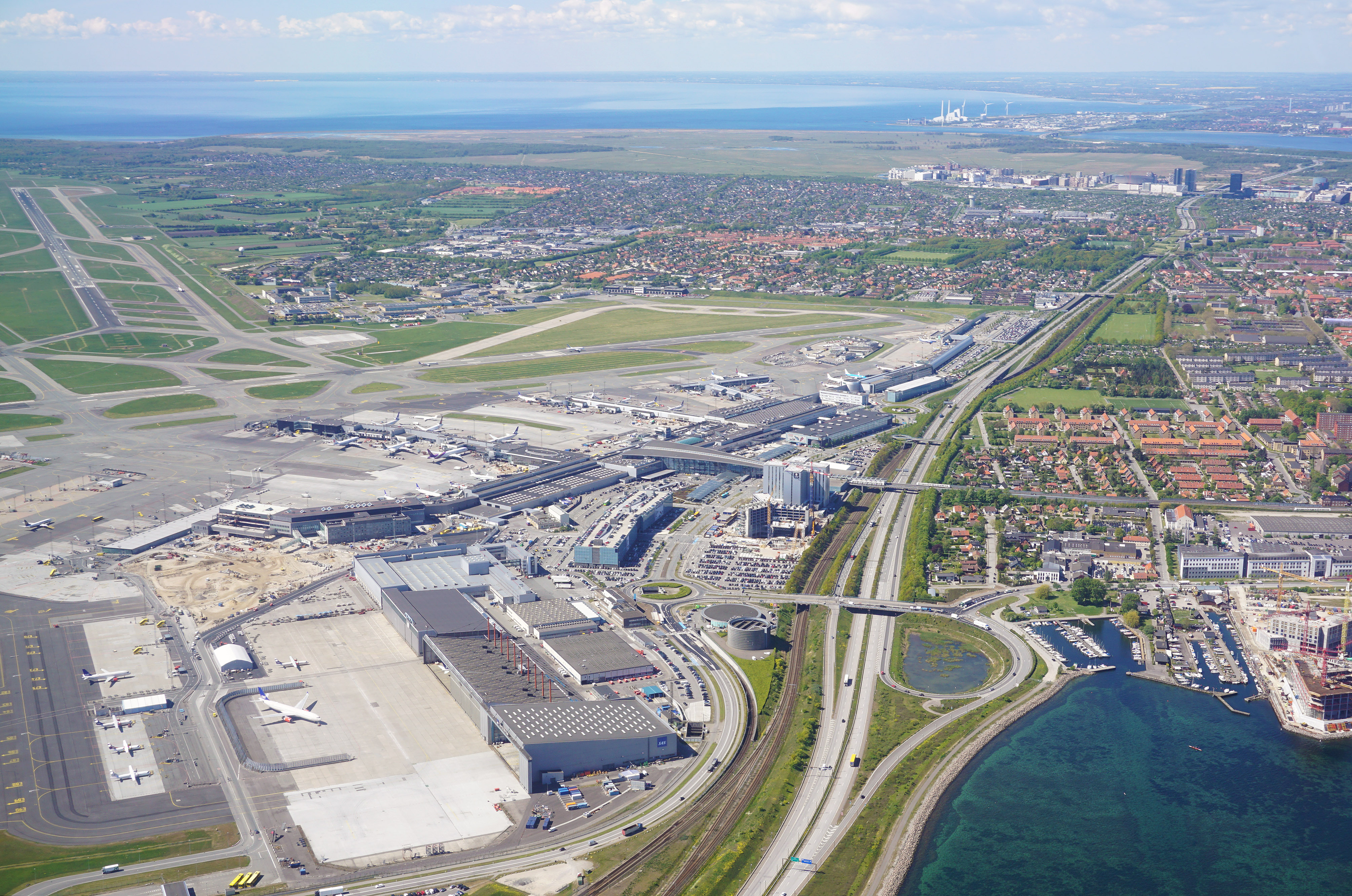
E20 next to the Copenhagen Airport

In Denmark, E20 is a motorway from Esbjerg to the Øresund Bridge. The length of the Danish part is 315 km (196 mi).

It passes first along Jutland from Esbjerg to Kolding, then crosses the Little Belt Bridge onto Funen. E20 crosses the entirety of Funen, passing approximately 2 km south of Odense. Then, at Nyborg, E20 crosses the Great Belt Fixed Link onto Zealand. E20 follows the Vestmotorvejen until Køge, where it goes north to Copenhagen. In Copenhagen, E20 passes south of the city, crossing onto Kastrup where it meets the Copenhagen Airport. Between Køge and Copenhagen, the road has three E-road numbers (also E47 and E55).

The Great Belt Bridge and Øresund Bridge are both tolled. The Øresund crossing begins as a tunnel at Kastrup, which then transfers onto the bridge at the man-made island Peberholm. The road crosses the border between Denmark and Sweden on the Øresund Bridge.

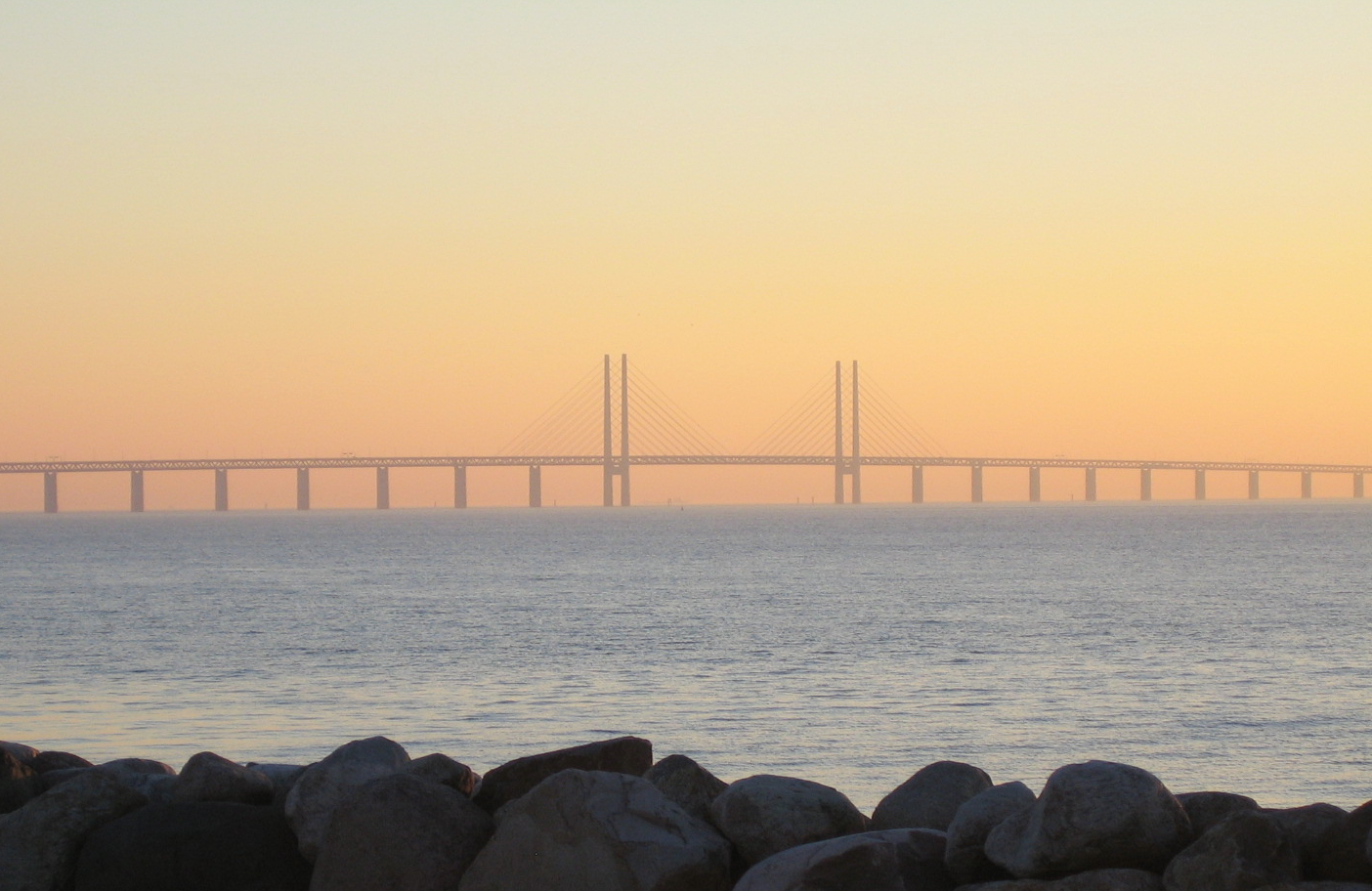
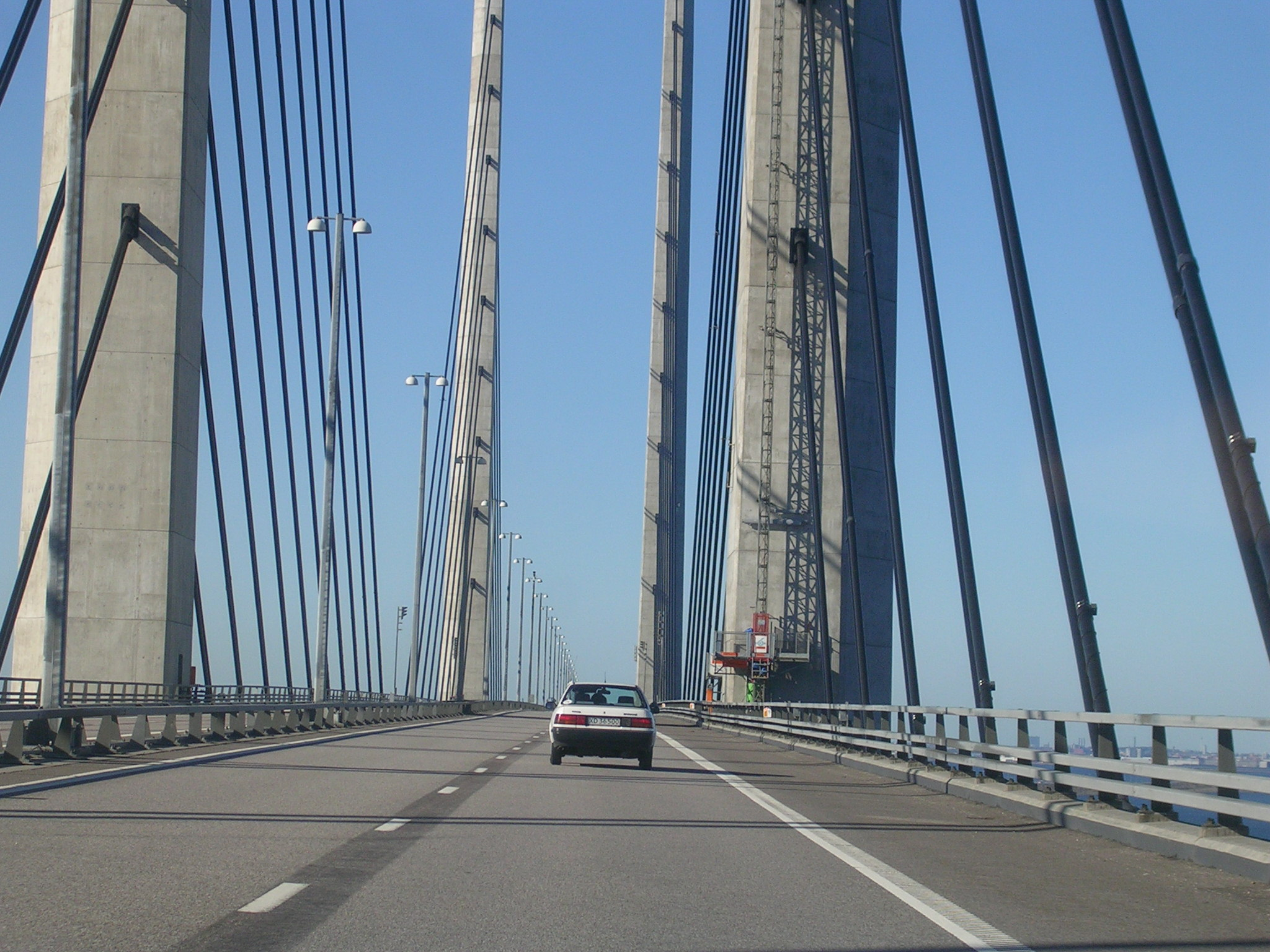
Øresund Bridge, between Denmark and Sweden

In Sweden, E20 is a motorway from the Öresund Bridge in Malmö to Alingsås 48 km northeast of Gothenburg, a 330 km (210 mi) long motorway. Furthermore, it is a motorway most of the route from Vretstorp (20 km (12 mi) west of Örebro) to Stockholm.

The Swedish part of E20 is 770 km (480 mi) long. Its extent is shared with E6 along a 280 km (170 mi) long stretch, with E18 along 50 km (31 mi) and with E4 along 35 km (22 mi).

The part through Stockholm has very heavy traffic, including the most heavily trafficked road in Scandinavia, Essingeleden (160,000/day). There is often congestion on this stretch. A new tunnel for route E20, "Norra länken", was built north of the city center and opened 30 November 2014. The planned Förbifart Stockholm bypass will divert traffic from Essingeleden.

Between Stockholm and Tallinn a car ferry departs daily, taking 15 hours. The port in Stockholm is located at Lilla Värtan, about 4 km northeast of the central core of the city.

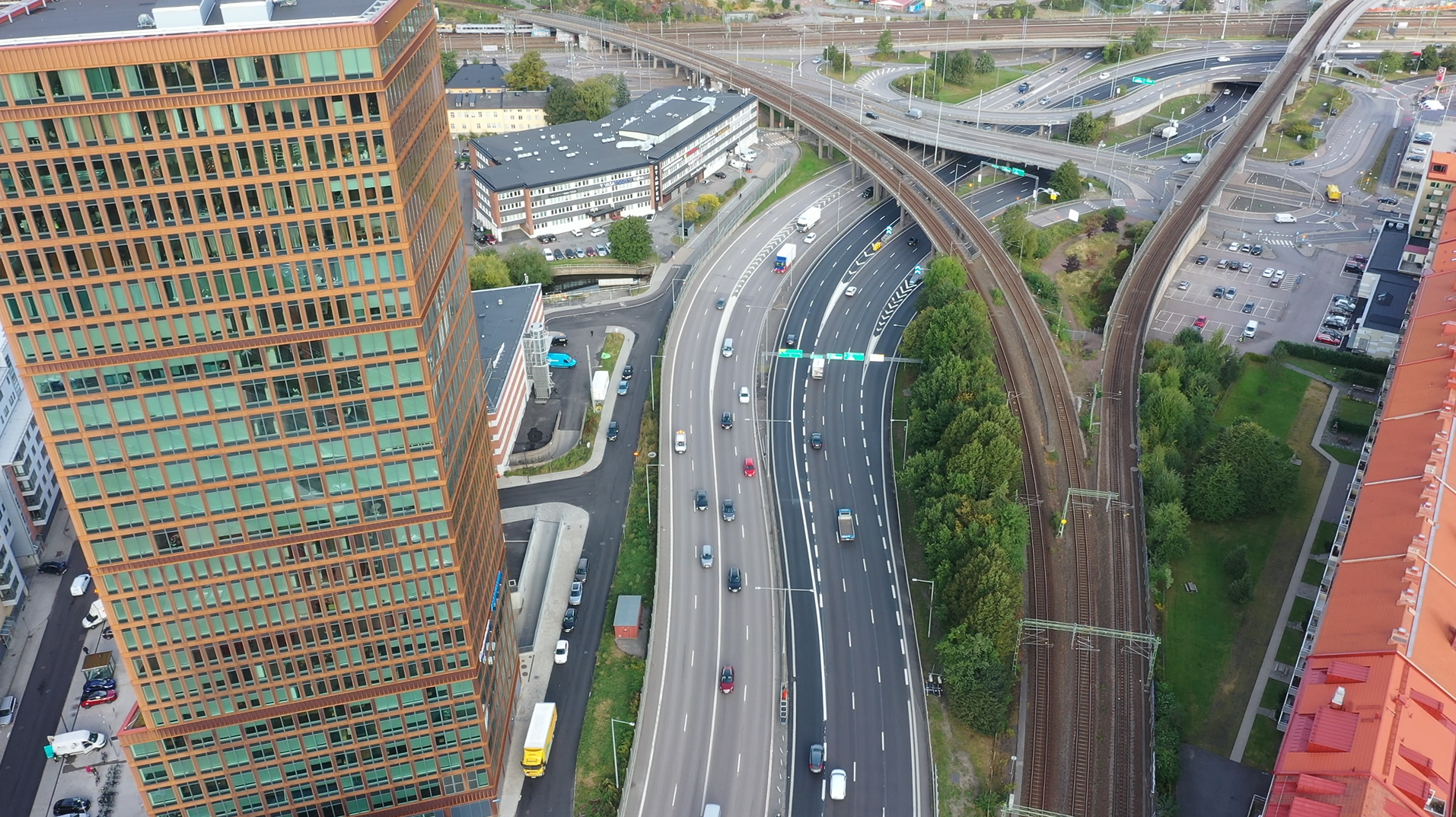
The west coast motorway E6/E20 in Gothenburg, coming from Malmö. In the interchange (Olskroksmotet) the E20 continues in the north-easterly direction to Stockholm and E6 continues in a northerly direction to Oslo.

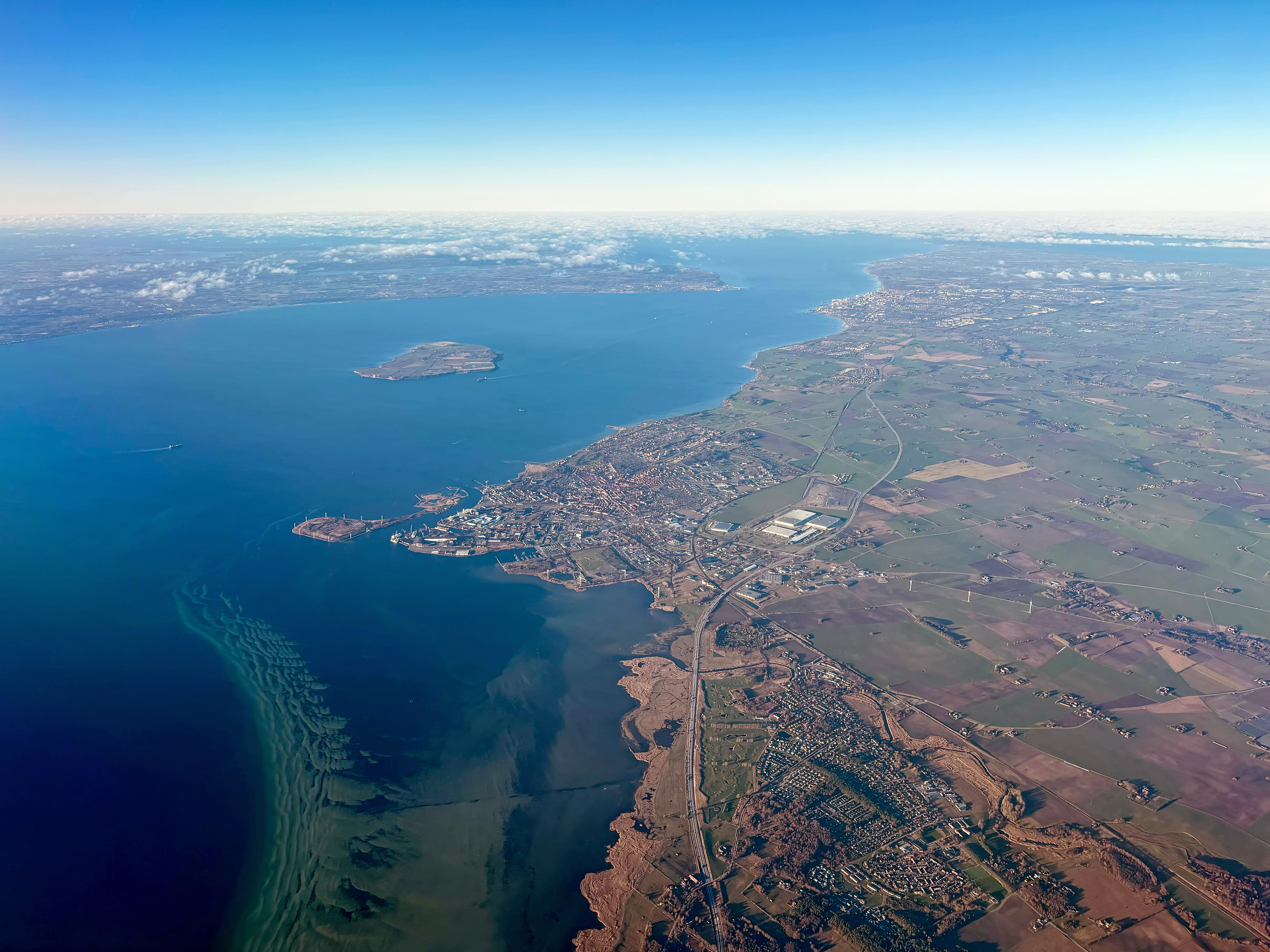
East coast of Öresund, at Landskrona between Malmö and Helsingborg

=== Estonia and Russia ===
In Estonia, E20 follows the route of national main road nr. 1 (Tallinn–Narva). In Tallinn to relieve traffic a bridge has been built on the intersection of the E263 and the E20. The E20 across Estonia is partially an unsigned expressway for 87 km east of Tallinn to Haljala along with a section near Kohtla-Järve and Jõhvi (km 155.9–163.2). The speed limit on the dual carriageway sections is 110 km/h in summer and 90 km/h in the winter with some dual carriageway sections allowing 100 km/h in the winter months but these are set to the parts of the dual carriageway sections where there's not a greater risk of wildlife and pedestrians.

The remainder being single carriageway all the way to Narva where it crosses to Russia on the Friendship bridge.

The distance from Tallinn to the Russian border at the Narva River is 218 km.

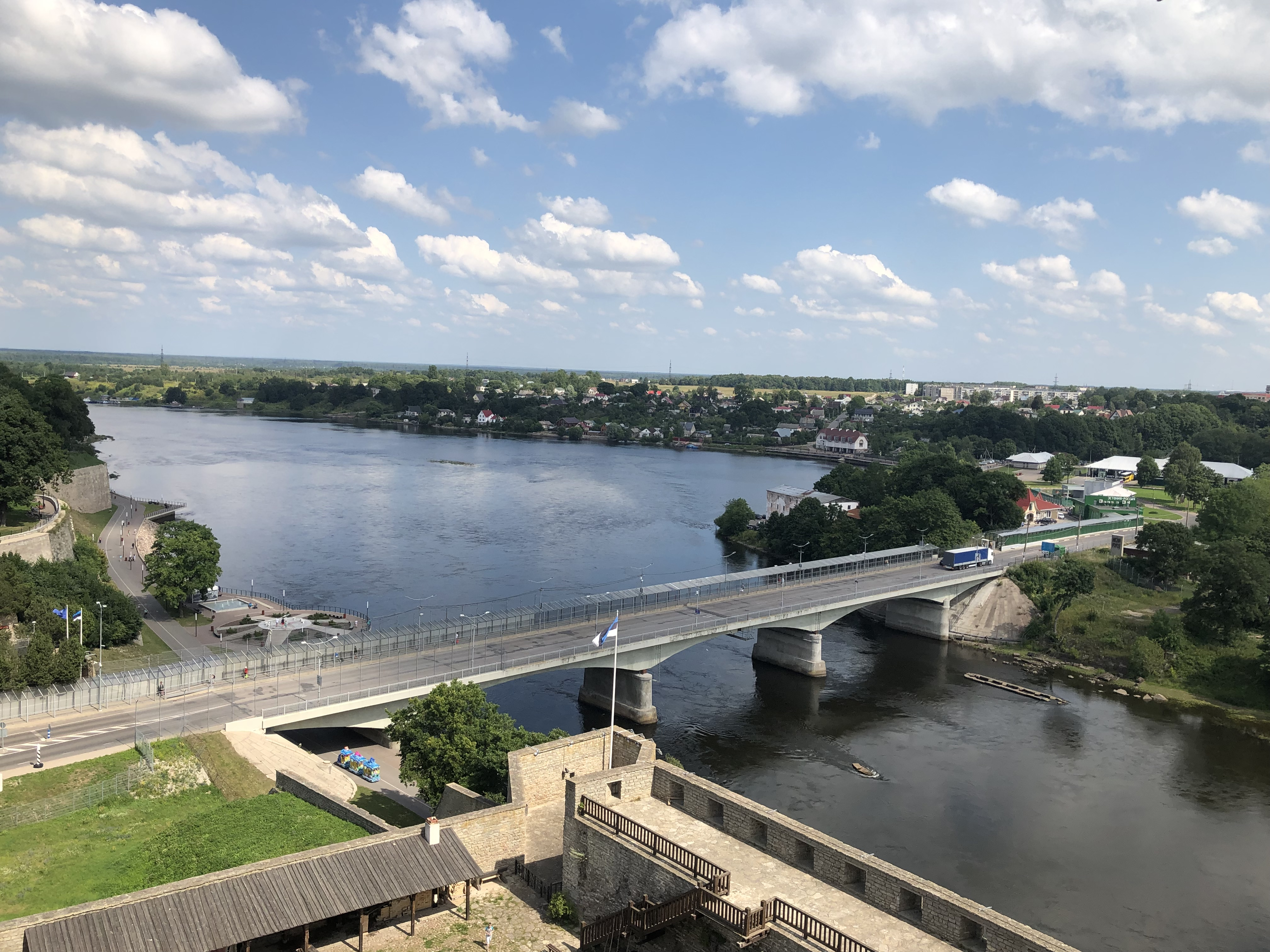
The Narva Friendship Bridge, spanning the Narva River between Narva, Estonia and Ivangorod, Russia

In Russia, the route takes the Narva Highway (also listed in the Russian road numbering system as the A180 route, formerly known as the M11 route) running from Ivangorod to Saint Petersburg as a dual-lane highway. The distance from Ivangorod to Saint Petersburg is 142 km.

The border control facilities at the Estonia-Russia crossing are equipped and being operated for a limited amount of traffic on both sides of the border. The border crossing requires a reservation - despite this, waiting lines still can extend for many hours and even days.

== Itinerary ==
- Ireland
  - N19: Shannon Airport - Shannon
  - N18: Shannon - Limerick
  - M7: Limerick - Borris-in-Ossory ( E201) - Portlaoise - Naas
  - N7: Naas - Dublin
  - M50: Dublin
- Gap (Irish Sea)
  - : (Republic of Ireland) Dublin - (United Kingdom) Liverpool
- United Kingdom
  - A5036: Bootle
  - M57: Liverpool Outer Ring Road (Whole length)
  - M62: Huyton - Manchester (Interchange with E5 and start of multiplex with E22 at Warrington)
  - M60: Manchester Outer Ring Road (Clockwise)
  - M62: Manchester - (Interchange with E15 at Pontefract and end of multiplex with E22 at Goole)
  - A63: - Hull
  - A1033: Hull
- Gap (North Sea)
  - (United Kingdom) Hull - (Denmark) Esbjerg
- Denmark
  - E20: Esbjerg - Kolding ( E45) - Køge (Start of Concurrency with E47 E55) - København (End of Concurrency with E47 E55)
- Sweden
  - E20: Malmö ( E22 / E65, Start of Concurrency with E6) - Helsingborg ( E4) - Gothenburg ( E45, End of Concurrency with E6) - Örebro (Start of Concurrency with E18) - Arboga (End of Concurrency with E18) - Eskilstuna - Södertälje (Start of Concurrency with E4) - Stockholm (End of Concurrency with E4, Towards E18)
- Gap (Baltic Sea)
  - : (Sweden) Stockholm - (Estonia) Tallinn
- Estonia
  - Jõe, Narva maantee, Tartu maantee: Tallinn ( E67)
  - T1: Tallinn ( E67 E263 E265) - Jõhvi ( E264) - Narva
- Russia
  - A 180: Ivangorod - Saint Petersburg (Towards E18 E95 E105)
