= R511 road =

R511 road may refer to:

- R511 road (Ireland)
- R511 road (South Africa)
