= R509 road =

R509 road may refer to:

- R509 road (Ireland)
- R509 road (South Africa)
