= Shannon Airport =

International airport in County Clare, Ireland

Shannon Airport Aerfort na Sionainne

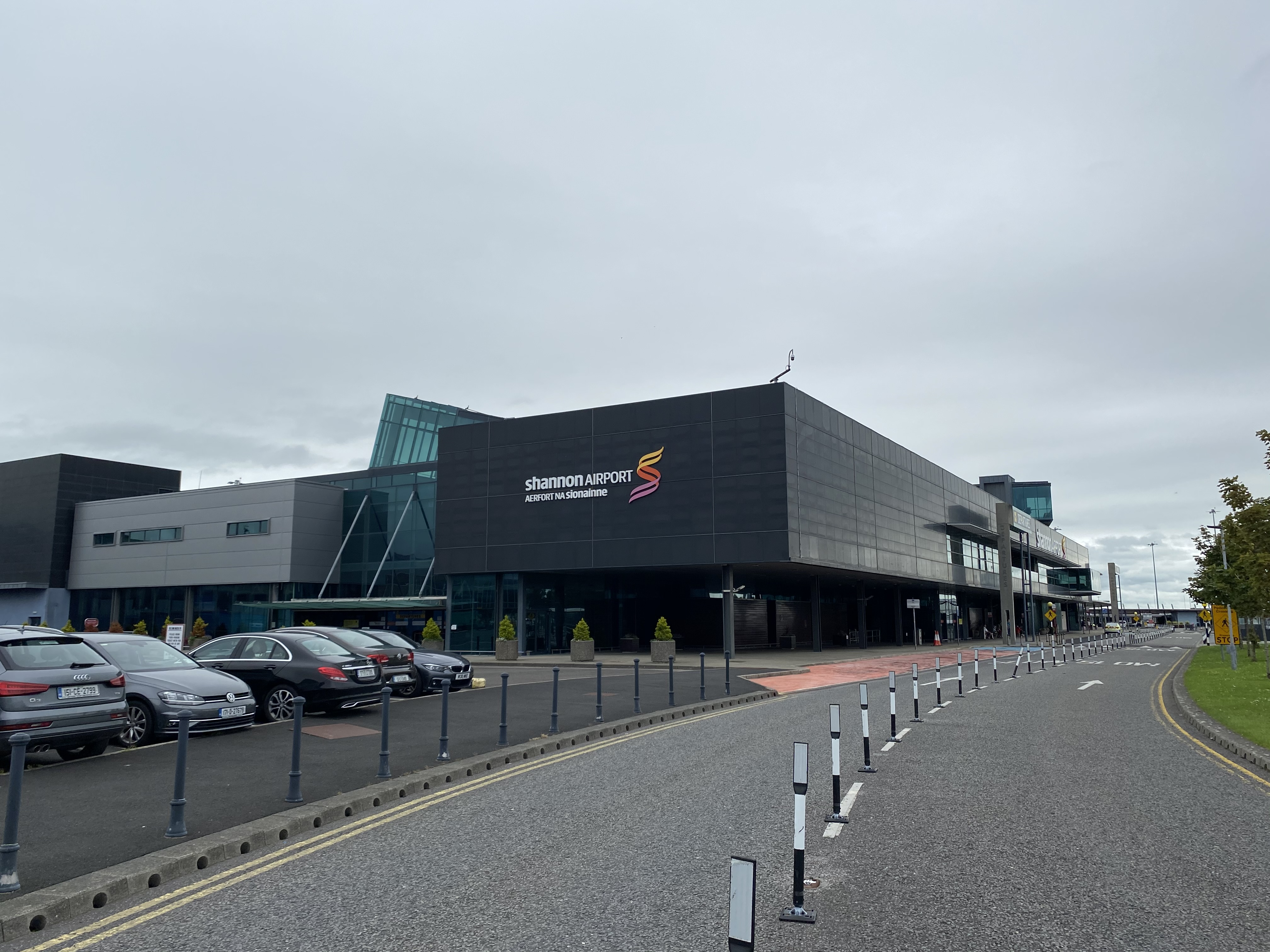
- IATA: SNN; ICAO: EINN; WMO: 03962

Summary
- Airport type: Public
- Owner: Government of Ireland
- Operator: Shannon Airport Authority plc
- Serves: Mid-West Region, Ireland
- Location: Shannon, County Clare
- Focus city for: Ryanair
- Elevation AMSL: 46 ft (14 m)
- Coordinates: 52°42′07″N 008°55′29″W
- Website: www.shannonairport.ie

Map
- Location in Ireland

Runways
Direction	Length		Surface
Direction	m	ft	Surface
06/24	3,199	10,495	Asphalt

Statistics (2024)
- Passengers: 2,100,000
- Passenger change ’23-’24: ▲7%
- Aircraft movements: 18,086
- Movements change ’21-’22: ▲98%
- Source: Irish AIS; Passengers; Aircraft movements

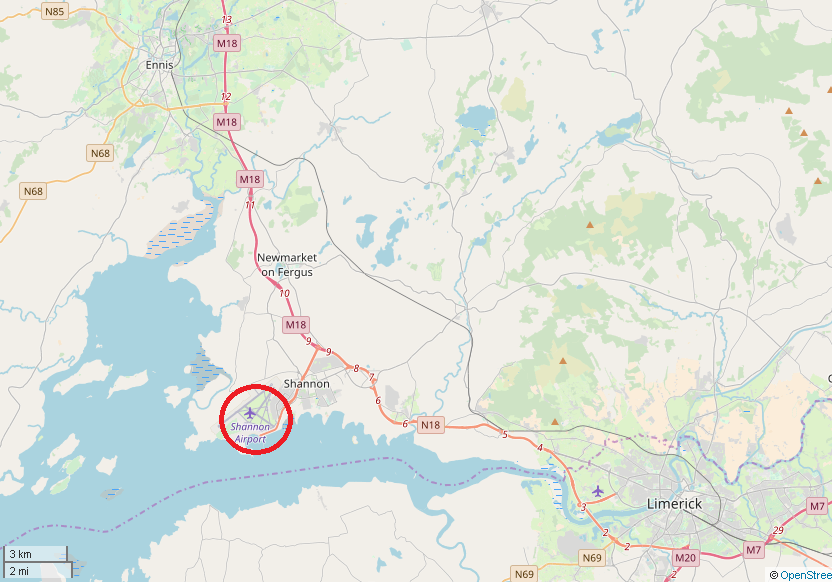
Shannon Airport in relation to Ennis and Limerick

Shannon Airport (Irish: Aerfort na Sionainne; IATA: SNN, ICAO: EINN) is an international airport located in County Clare in Ireland. It is adjacent to the Shannon Estuary and lies halfway between Ennis and Limerick. With almost 2 million passengers in 2023, the airport is the third busiest airport in the Republic of Ireland, and the fifth busiest on the island of Ireland. Shannon has had a long association with transatlantic flight, owing to its position on the west coast of Ireland and being one of the most westerly international airports in Europe. One half of Shanwick Oceanic Control, which controls all air traffic on the north eastern quadrant of the North Atlantic Ocean, is located close to the airport in nearby Ballygirreen.

The airport was built in the late 1930s, with the first commercial flight taking place in 1939. Shannon was the landing point for the first transatlantic proving flight in 1945 and became the world's first duty-free airport in 1947. By the 1960s, it was a busy refuelling stop for many transatlantic carriers. Europe's first United States border preclearance facility opened there in 1986. At 3.2 kilometres (2 mi), Shannon has the longest runway in Ireland, which allowed it to be a designated alternative landing site for the Space Shuttle.

== History ==
=== Establishment ===
In the late 1930s, transatlantic air traffic was dominated by flying boats, and a flying boat terminal was located at Foynes on the south side of the Shannon Estuary. However, it was realised that changing technology would require a permanent runway and airport.

In 1936, the Government of Ireland confirmed that it would develop a 3.1-square-kilometre (1.2 sq mi) site at Rineanna for the country's first transatlantic airport. The land on which the airport was to be built was boggy and on 8 October 1936 work began to drain it. In July 1939, a SABENA Savoia-Marchetti S.73 from Brussels via Croydon Airport was the first commercial flight to use the Rineanna airfield.

By 1942, a serviceable airport had been established and was named Shannon Airport. BOAC began scheduled service to Bristol on 21 February 1942 to provide a land plane connection between England and the flying boat terminal at Foynes. Aer Lingus began scheduled service to Dublin in August 1942.

=== Transatlantic service ===
By the end of World War II in 1945, the existing runways at Shannon were extended to allow transatlantic flights to take off. The first Air Services Agreement between Ireland and the United States in 1945 permitted U.S. airlines to serve only Shannon, and permitted Irish airlines to serve only Boston, Chicago and New York.

On 16 September 1945, the first transatlantic proving flight, a Pan Am DC-4, landed at Shannon from Gander. On 24 October 1945, the first scheduled transatlantic commercial flight using a land plane, an American Overseas Airlines DC-4, Flagship New England, stopped at the airport on the New York City–Gander–Shannon–London route. Trans World Airlines began service between New York and Paris via Gander and Shannon on 5 February 1946, and began a Shannon-Dublin tag flight in 1974 after the US Civil Aeronautics Board threatened to ban Aer Lingus from landing in New York. Aerlinte Eireann began service from Dublin to New York via Shannon on 28 April 1958.

In 1947, the "Customs Free Airport Act" established Shannon as the world's first duty-free airport, a move promoted by Brendan O'Regan. Shannon became a model for other duty-free facilities worldwide.

In 1969, it was announced that a new government agency, Aer Rianta (now the Dublin Airport Authority), would be given responsibility for Shannon Airport. Passenger numbers at the airport reached 460,000 that year. With the increase in passengers and the introduction of the Boeing 747, it was decided that a new enlarged terminal was needed. The first commercial operation of a 747 took place in April 1971, while the new terminal officially opened in May that year.

=== Aeroflot service ===
Aeroflot began service to Shannon in September 1975 as a stop between the Soviet Union and other Communist bloc countries, such as Cuba and Angola. Aeroflot kept its own fuel storage at Shannon and allowed the airport to sell the Soviet fuel to other airlines.

The United States demanded that Ireland suspend Aeroflot's Shannon operations following the shooting down of Korean Air Lines Flight 007 in 1983, and Ireland temporarily banned Aeroflot later that year. Nonetheless, the Aeroflot operation returned and developed into a hub by the mid-1990s, with flights to New York, Chicago, Washington, Miami, and Havana, largely using Ilyushin Il-62 aircraft.

The cooperation between Aeroflot and Aer Rianta at Shannon also led to a joint venture between the two companies to open duty-free shops at Sheremetyevo Airport in 1987.

On 30 September 1994, Shannon was the site of the "circling over Shannon" diplomatic incident involving Russian president Boris Yeltsin.

=== The "Shannon stopover" ===
In 1990, the U.S.-Irish bilateral agreement was changed to allow Irish airlines to serve Los Angeles and additional U.S. airlines to serve Dublin via Shannon. An amendment in 1993 allowed airlines to provide direct transatlantic services to Dublin, but 50% of transatlantic flights had to either originate or stop over in Shannon. During the 1990s, the airport began to struggle. However, 1996 saw the beginning of Continental Airlines flying between Dublin, Shannon and Newark, New Jersey. Shannon began to rebound in the late 1990s with the success of the Irish economy, the improving situation in Northern Ireland and an influx of American tourists.

In 2005, an agreement was reached regarding a transitional period. Beginning in November 2006 and ending in April 2008, the agreement gradually eliminated restrictions on cargo services. For passenger service, it reduced the stopover requirement and allowed Irish airlines to serve three additional U.S. destinations.

In 2007, the European Union and the U.S. announced that an agreement had been reached on an open skies aviation policy (EU–US Open Skies Agreement). The agreement came into effect from 30 March 2008, leading to the abolition of the Shannon Stopover, although this would have happened under the 2005 agreement anyway. In 2007, Shannon carried 3.2 million passengers.

=== Space Shuttle ===
The American embassy in Dublin wrote to the Department of Foreign Affairs in 1995 to say that the United States space administration, NASA, might need to use the airport as a landing site for their Space Shuttles during any launch emergencies. The Americans said their spacecraft would be retrieved from Shannon and that they would pay compensation if it missed the airport and crashed on a populated area. They also mentioned that Irish authorities were obliged to allow the spacecraft to land according to international treaties signed by Ireland.

=== 2000s ===
Ryanair increased services and passenger numbers at the airport until 2008. However, after a disagreement with the Dublin Airport Authority (DAA) in 2008, Ryanair announced that the number of based aircraft would be reduced from four to one and 150 jobs would be lost.

CityJet launched a twice-daily route to Charles de Gaulle Airport in 2008 when Aer Lingus closed its London Heathrow flights. CityJet pulled out of Shannon in October 2009.

=== Independent operation, 2012 to present ===
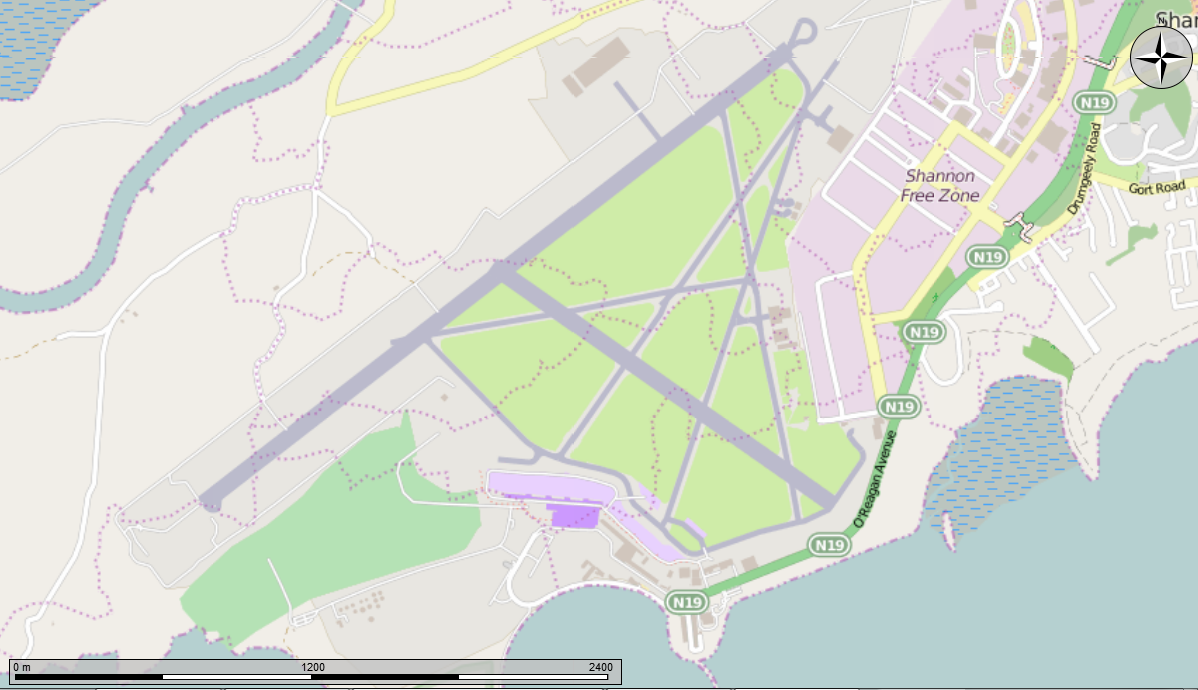
Map of the airport

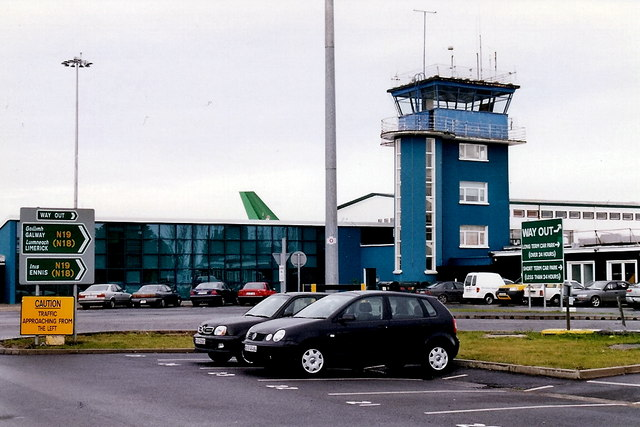
Control tower at Shannon Airport

In December 2012, it was announced that Shannon Airport would separate from the Dublin Airport Authority, which still owns Dublin and Cork airports. On 31 December 2012 at 11:59 pm, Shannon Airport became a publicly owned commercial airport and is now operated and run by the Shannon Airport Authority plc. Shannon announced a target in 2012 to grow its passenger numbers to 2.5 million annually within five years. However, Shannon has fallen short of its stated targeted figure with just 1.74 million flying through the airport in 2017.

In March 2013, the new company appointed Neil Pakey as its first CEO. Traffic figures for June 2013 report an 8% increase on the previous year, the first time a traffic increase has been recorded in three years. On 21 March 2013, Ryanair announced a new twice-weekly route to Alicante, Spain, to begin on 5 June for the summer months. That brought Shannon's total to 33 seasonal scheduled summer routes. In August 2013, Aer Lingus announced a 1x weekly service to Lanzarote, Canary Islands, Spain, every Saturday during the winter months, using an A320. In October 2013, United Airlines confirmed it will increase capacity by 88% on its Shannon-Chicago route for 2014. In late 2013, Aer Lingus announced 2 new routes to Málaga, Spain, (two weekly) and to Bristol, UK, (one daily). Ryanair also announced 8 new routes from Shannon to continental Europe. The new routes began from the start of April 2014, and a second Boeing 737-800 was based at Shannon to accommodate the extra 300,000 passengers a year it would bring in. The destinations announced were Berlin Schonefeld, Beauvais, Memmingen, Warsaw Modlin, Kraków, Nice, Faro, and Fuerteventura.

On 4 July 2014, the "Bank of Ireland Runway Night Run" featured 1,200 people running along Shannon's runway to raise money for charity.

In late 2014, Aer Lingus Regional operator Stobart Air said that they would close their Shannon base in early 2015. They returned in June 2015 operating six flights weekly Birmingham service followed by six flights weekly Edinburgh service. In late 2015, they announced a new CEO for Shannon, Matthew Thomas. Ryanair announced that it will be ending its Paris and Memmingen routes in late 2016, and it also reduced its Manchester and London Stansted routes. Ryanair is aiming for 720,000 passengers in Summer 2017 even though they were close to 800,000 in Summer 2016. In October 2016, SAS announced a new route to Stockholm from 1 August 2017 to 7 October 2017. Shortly after that, Lufthansa announced a weekly service to Frankfurt, running from April to October in 2017. In September 2017, Ryanair announced a new Route to Reus. It will run through summer 2018 operating 2x weekly (Tuesdays and Saturdays), replacing the route to Berlin. The same day, Air Canada announced a new 4x weekly service to Toronto with the Boeing 737 MAX. In February 2018, Ryanair announced it would resume flights to Bristol and Liverpool from May 2018. In late 2018, Ryanair announced a new twice weekly service to Ibiza, and the resumption of flights to East Midlands, both beginning in April 2019. The East Midlands, Bristol and Ibiza flights are all being ceased at the end of the 2019 summer season due to fears of Brexit and the 737 MAX groundings. Due to the 737 MAX groundings, Air Canada and Norwegian Airlines suspended their routes to Shannon. This reduced the number of passenger by 120,000. On 23 October 2019, Lauda announced that they will launch a twice weekly flight to Shannon from their base in Vienna, operating every Wednesday and Saturday. The airport handled 1,864,762 passengers in 2018. This number is the highest passenger numbers since gaining independence from the DAA.

=== Use by foreign militaries ===
Shannon Airport has a history of foreign military use. A large part of its business in recent years has been military stopovers, currently almost all American; however, the airport was also frequently used by the Soviet military until the 1990s, since Ireland, having a traditional policy of military neutrality, was not a member of NATO. There were some restrictions, such as carrying no arms, ammunition, or explosives, and that the flights in question did not form part of military exercises or operations. Shannon saw military transports throughout the Cold War and during the first Gulf War.

In the aftermath of the September 11 attacks, the Irish government offered the use of Shannon to the US government. When the United States invaded Iraq in 2003, the government still allowed United States Armed Forces to use the airport. This caused controversy and was the subject of protests and a challenge brought to the High Court. As of November 2008, approximately 1.2 million troops had passed through Shannon since the beginning of the Iraq War. In 2012–2013, the military flight contracts are held by Omni Air International.

On 6 December 2005, the BBC programme Newsnight alleged that Shannon was used on at least 33 occasions by United States Central Intelligence Agency (CIA) flights, thought to be part of a US policy called extraordinary rendition. The New York Times reported the number to be 33, though referring to "Ireland" rather than Shannon, while Amnesty International has alleged the number of flights to be 50. Casement Aerodrome has seen similar reports. The United States and Ireland have denied these allegations. German Khaled El-Masri, who was mistakenly tortured by the CIA after being abducted by the Macedonian police, was taken to an Afghan black site by a plane which had stopped at Shannon Airport on its way to North Macedonia to pick him up. In response, Amnesty International Ireland reported that "the Irish Government knew that the CIA used Shannon Airport as part of their renditions operations" and called for an independent investigation into the use of Shannon Airport for extraordinary renditions operation by the USA.

After a call by the Irish Human Rights Commission that the Irish government inspect aircraft supposed to be a part of the US extraordinary rendition program, the Minister for Foreign Affairs Dermot Ahern rejected these proposals. In a leaked diplomatic cable written by US ambassador to Ireland Thomas C. Foley, Foley reported that Ahern thought it "might not be a bad idea to allow the random inspection of a few planes to proceed, which would provide cover if a rendition flight ever surfaced. He seemed quite convinced that at least three flights involving renditions had refueled at Shannon Airport before or after conducting renditions elsewhere".

In 2026, Alexus Grynkewich, NATO's top military commander, described Shannon Airport as "a very important logistics hub, [which] allows America to project power and keep threats at bay from all over the world".

== Facilities ==
=== Overview ===
The last major addition to the current airport terminal was opened on 27 March 2000 by the Minister for Public Enterprise, Mary O'Rourke. This facility has 40 check-in desks, five baggage carousels and 14 boarding gates (including six airbridges). There are nearly 20 aircraft parking stands. The car parks can hold 4,200 cars.

Much of the older landside section of the airport has been renovated with new 'Shannon Airport' branding. An airside area renovation and passenger separation project was completed in Summer 2010.

When Eirjet existed, its head office was located on the grounds of Shannon Airport.

In 2024, Aer Lingus announced the airline would be closing its Shannon based cargo facility citing low demand and lack of commercial justification to remain present there. Cargo operations managed by IAG Cargo reviewed the ongoing operations at Shannon airport and decided it would be beneficial to close the facility at the end of 2024.

=== U.S. Customs and Border Protection pre-clearance ===
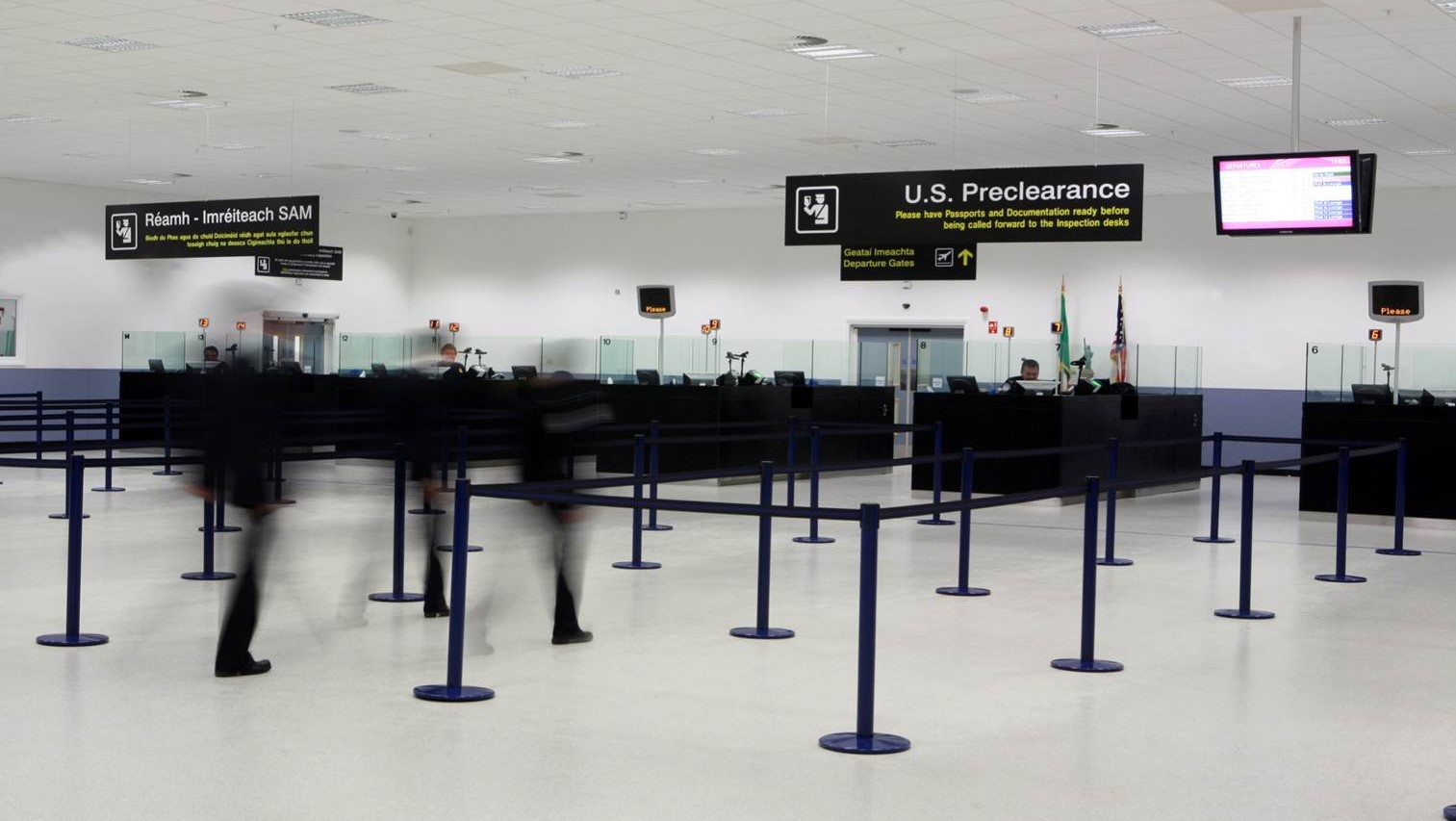
U.S. preclearance facility at Shannon Airport

In 1986, a United States border preclearance facility was opened at Shannon, eliminating the need to go through immigration on arrival in the United States. This operation was administered by the US Justice Department, specifically the Immigration and Naturalization Service (INS).

In November 2008, it was announced that US customs and agriculture inspections would be added, making Shannon the first airport in Europe to offer this service and to enable passengers to arrive in New York on a "domestic" basis. To have these facilities put in place, a two-storey, 7,000 m^{2} (75,000 sq ft) extension to the main terminal building was constructed. The facility opened the morning of 5 August 2009.

These services were extended to cover private aircraft in 2010, making Shannon the first airport in Europe to offer US border preclearance for private aircraft. Shannon is the only airport to do so in Europe as of September 2016.

Between 2009 and 2020, British Airways operated business class–only flights between London City Airport and John F. Kennedy International Airport in New York. Of these, the westbound flights stopped for fuel in Shannon to allow them to take off from the short runway of the London City Airport, which is located in the London Docklands area. This stop also allowed passengers to clear US Customs and Immigration in Shannon rather than at JFK. Introduced in 2009, two flights per day, one of which carried the flight number BA1, were operated using A318 aircraft capable of operating steep approaches. The flights were halved in 2017, and in 2020, amid their suspension due to the COVID-19 pandemic, it was announced that the flights would not be resumed.

=== Security ===
In 2021, Shannon Airport deployed CT scanners at passenger security checkpoints, enabling it to lift the restrictions on liquids which had been in place since 2006.

== Airlines and destinations ==
=== Passenger ===
The following airlines operate regular scheduled flights to and from Shannon:

Airlines	Destinations
Aer Lingus	Boston, London–Heathrow, New York–JFK, Paris–Charles de Gaulle
Air Canada	Seasonal: Toronto–Pearson (begins 10 June 2027)
Delta Air Lines	Seasonal: New York–JFK
Discover Airlines	Seasonal: Frankfurt
Ryanair	Alicante, Birmingham, Budapest, Edinburgh, Faro, Fuerteventura, Funchal, Gran Canaria, Kaunas, Kraków, Lanzarote, Liverpool, London–Gatwick, London–Stansted, Madrid, Málaga, Manchester, Poznań, Rome–Ciampino, Tenerife–South, Warsaw–Modlin, Wrocław; Seasonal: Béziers, Corfu, Girona, Malta, Naples, Palma de Mallorca, Porto, Reus, Rovaniemi, Turin
United Airlines	Seasonal: Chicago–O'Hare, Newark

Shannon Airport passenger destinations map (13 July 2026)

=== Cargo ===
Airlines	Destinations
Turkish Cargo	Atlanta, Chicago–O'Hare, Istanbul, New York–JFK

== Statistics ==
=== Passenger numbers ===
Year	Total passengers	Passengers % change YoY
2005	3,302,046	▲32.1
2006	3,639,046	▲10.2
2007	3,620,623	▼0.5
2008	3,169,529	▼12.5
2009	2,794,563	▼11.8
2010	1,755,885	▼37.2
2011	1,625,453	▼7.4
2012	1,394,781	▼14.2
2013	1,440,034	▲3.2
2014	1,639,315	▲13.8
2015	1,714,872	▲4.6
2016	1,749,367	▲2.0
2017	1,751,500	▲0.1
2018	1,864,762	▲6.5
2019	1,710,000	▼8.0
2020	360,000	▼78.9
2021	379,935	▲5.5
2022	1,518,170	▲300
2023	1,958,000	▲29
2024	2,050,831	▲8
2025	2,300,000	▲9

=== Busiest routes ===
10 busiest international routes at Shannon Airport (2024)
Rank	Airport	Passengers handled	% change 2023/24
1	London–Heathrow	284,621	▲10.3
2	London–Stansted	241,283	▲0.5
3	New York–JFK	135,471	▲39.4
4	London–Gatwick	122,581	▲2.5
5	Boston	101,740	▲0.7
6	Kraków	75,250	▲49.2
7	Manchester	74,878	▼5.8
8	Wroclaw	74,170	▲-
9	Faro	72,014	▲ -
10	Lanzarote	70,745	▲ -
^{Source: Central Statistics Office}

== Ground transportation ==
=== Road ===
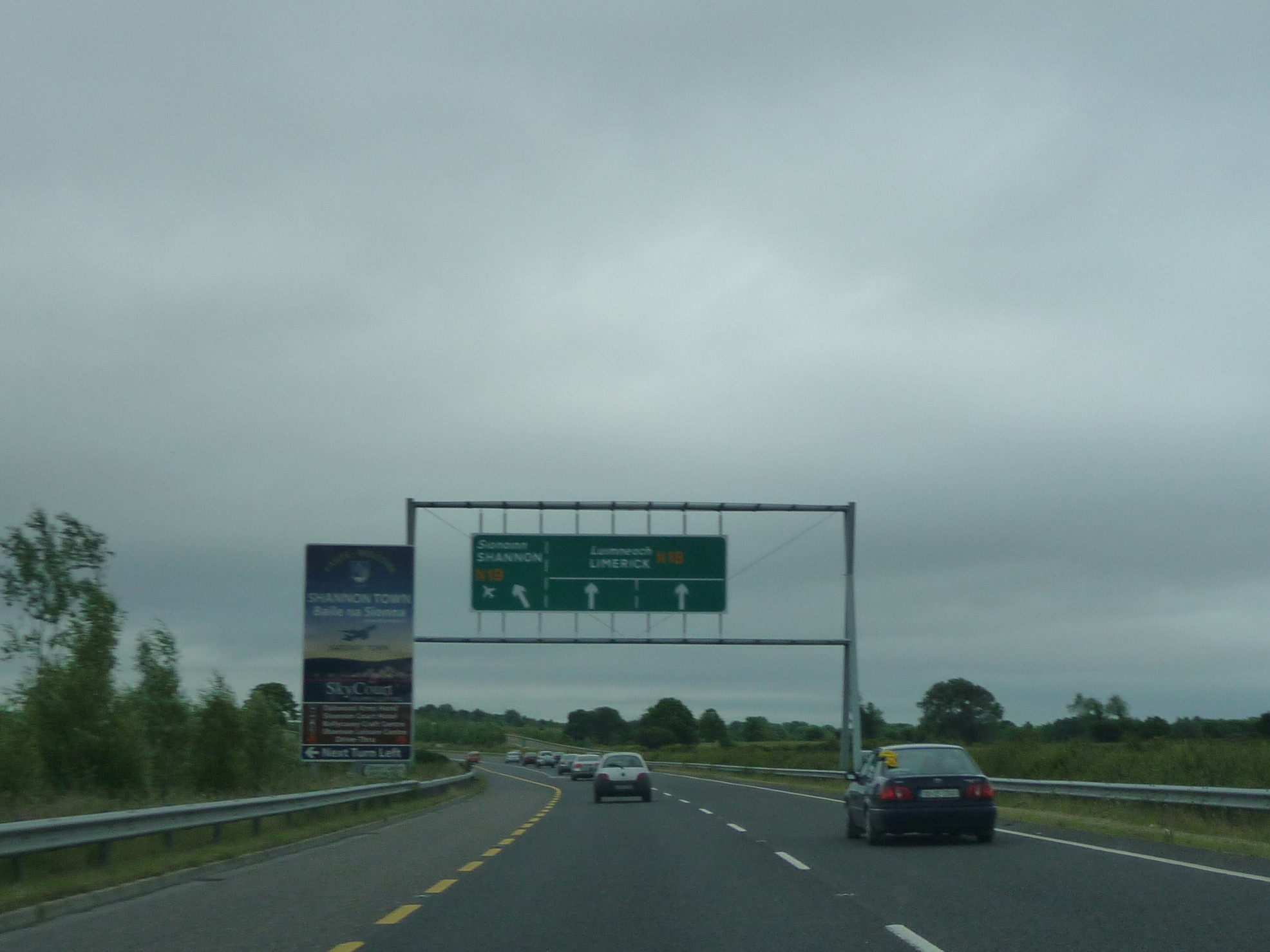
N18 near Shannon Airport exit

Shannon Airport is the end destination of the N19 national route, which connects to the N18/M18 Limerick–Ennis–Galway route. It is also the western end of European road E20. A dual carriageway section of the N19 was finished in 2004, bypassing the town of Shannon, and a new interchange and dual carriageway north to Ennis were completed in 2007 on the N18 (M18). It is approximately 20 kilometres (12 mi) south of Ennis, 25 kilometres (16 mi) west of Limerick and around 85 kilometres (53 mi) south of Galway. Dublin is approximately 223 kilometres (139 mi) away and Cork is around 125 kilometres (78 mi) away.

=== Bus ===
Bus Éireann services from/to the airport:

- Route 51: Galway – Limerick – Cork
- Route 343: Limerick – Shannon – Ennis

From 20 June 2024 Expressway will commence route X51 on nonstop service to both Galway and Limerick

=== Car hire ===
Car hire is available in the arrivals hall of the terminal building, with five car rental firms operating at the airport. Private-hire coaches and buses such as Eirebus are available from many operators; these need to be pre-booked and can transport passengers to any destination in Ireland.

=== Car parking ===
Shannon Airport offers both short-term and long-term parking within the airport with over 5,000 spaces available. All car parks operate 24 hours and are regularly patrolled by Airport Police.

=== Rail link ===
For many years, a rail link to the airport (as a spur from the nearby Limerick–Ennis line) has been proposed, but nothing has materialised. Connecting with the nearest major stations (Ennis railway station and Limerick railway station) requires bus or taxi. Sixmilebridge is the nearest station to the airport.

== Accidents and incidents ==
Due to the location of Shannon, the airport receives a large number of emergency stopovers.

- 16 July 1943 - British Overseas Airways Corporation de Havilland DH91 Fortuna crash-landed short of the Runway 14 threshold. There were no injuries.
- 18 June 1946 - an Aer Lingus Douglas DC-3, EI-ACA, Charlie Alpha, on a domestic flight from Rineanna to Dublin crashed shortly after takeoff with only minor injuries reported. The aircraft made a wheels-up landing short of the runway and was damaged beyond repair.
- 28 December 1946 - TWA Lockheed Constellation NC86505 Flight 6963 crashed attempting to land at the airport in poor visibility. The aircraft was routing Paris, Shannon, Gander, New York. The aircraft crashed on its second attempt short of runway 14 on Inishmacnaughtan Island. Nine of the 23 people on board died.
- 15 April 1948 - Pan Am Flight 1-10, a Lockheed Constellation crashed attempting to land at the airport. 30 Passengers and crew died in the post crash fire. There was one survivor.
- 5 September 1954 - Lockheed Super Constellation PH-LKY, KLM Flight 633 from Amsterdam to New York City, using Shannon as a refuelling stop, crashed just after takeoff into a mudbank adjacent to the airport. 28 people on board died. There were 28 survivors.
- 15 July 1956 - a Swissair Convair CV-440-11 crashed on approach to the airport due to pilot error. The aircraft was on its delivery flight from San Diego, California, to Zürich via New York, Gander and Shannon. The crash killed all four crew on board.
- 14 August 1958 - Lockheed Super Constellation PH-LKM KLM Flight 607-E from Amsterdam to New York crashed into the Atlantic Ocean after a refuelling stop at Shannon, killing all 99 passengers and crew on board.
- 22 June 1959 - Pan American DC-6B N5026K, Clipper Panama, caught fire and burned on the runway as it was preparing to take off. The aircraft was preparing for a flight to New York. The number 1 propeller blade on the number 4 engine detached due to metal fatigue. The imbalance on the spinning propeller caused the engine to detach from the engine housing and a fire erupted on the wing. The eight occupants escaped from the aircraft, which was subsequently destroyed by fire.
- 26 February 1960 - an Alitalia Douglas DC-7C I-DUVO crashed after the port wingtip struck the wall of a cemetery after taking off from the airport. The aircraft had made an unscheduled refuelling stop en route from Rome to New York. The aircraft had not gained sufficient height to clear the hilltop where the cemetery is located. The aircraft then crashed in the field where it exploded and disintegrated, scattering wreckage over a wide area. 34 people out of 52 passengers and crew on board died as a result of the accident. One cabin crew member, a steward who was seated at the rear of the aircraft, survived the accident.
- 26 March 1961 - An Eagle Airways DC-6A G-APOM was damaged and subsequently destroyed by fire during a touch and go training exercise. The aircraft had landed on runway 24 and was accelerating for takeoff when the landing gear was inadvertently raised before the aircraft became airborne. The DC-6 settled onto the runway, veered to the left off the paved surface and onto the grass. A fire began on the port wing and eventually consumed and destroyed the aircraft. There were no injuries among the six crew, who evacuated the aircraft.
- 10 September 1961 - a President Airlines Douglas DC-6 crashed into the river Shannon after taking off from the airport on a flight to Gander. The disaster killed all 83 passengers and crew, one of the worst air disasters in Ireland's history. One cabin crew member survived the crash but died a few hours after being rescued.
- 30 September 1977 - an Interconair Bristol 175 Britannia 253 EI-BBY crashed in a field to the right of runway 24 after severe vibration on the approach. The left wing broke off and caught fire, but none of the six crew were injured in the crash.
- 2 October 1977 - Capitol Air DC-8-61 N911CL aborted takeoff on runway 24 as it accelerated for takeoff en route Rome-Shannon-Windsor Locks. There was a failure of tyres on the left main wheel bogie during taxi, and as the aircraft accelerated the tyre shredded and sent tyre fragments up into the wing underside, rupturing the fuel tanks. The escaping fuel ignited and caused a rapid large fire under the left wing. ATC spotted the fire as did the crew of a sister aircraft which was taxiing in after landing. The aircraft was just at the point of V1 when takeoff was abandoned and the DC-8 decelerated and stopped just short of the end of runway 24. The aircraft was evacuated and approximately 50 passengers were injured during the evacuation. The aircraft was seriously damaged but repaired and returned to service a number of months later. Had the aircraft become airborne, it is likely the left wing would have failed and the aircraft would have crashed.
- 20 June 1979 - American Airlines Flight 293 landed in Shannon after being hijacked.
- 5 February 2024 - Cargolux Boeing 747-400 LX-NCL, carrying flowers from Miami to Amsterdam, diverted to Shannon Airport due to a cargo deck fire warning. The aircraft landed safely and the crew was evacuated, but airport fire crews found no evidence of heat, smoke or fire. The runway where the flight landed was closed for two hours.
- 11 April 2026 - Daithi O'Corrain broke into a parked U.S. Air National Guard C-130H Hercules. He barricaded the doors and, over the next five hours, systematically destroyed the aircraft's core systems by severing electrical and hydraulic lines, crimping the liquid oxygen system, smashing all cockpit gauges, and deploying liquid gallium to embrittle the aluminium airframe. Before being apprehended by Irish police, he exited onto the roof, struck the exterior fuselage with an axe, and poured ball bearings and contaminants into the fuel tanks, rendering the $60 million aircraft permanently unairworthy.

== Environmental issues ==
As Shannon Airport has been built adjacent to the Shannon Estuary, it is likely to have problems with rising sea levels and high waters in the Shannon. The government is working on plans to protect both the airport and the town.
