= R509 road (Ireland) =

Road in Ireland

R509 road
- Bóthar R509
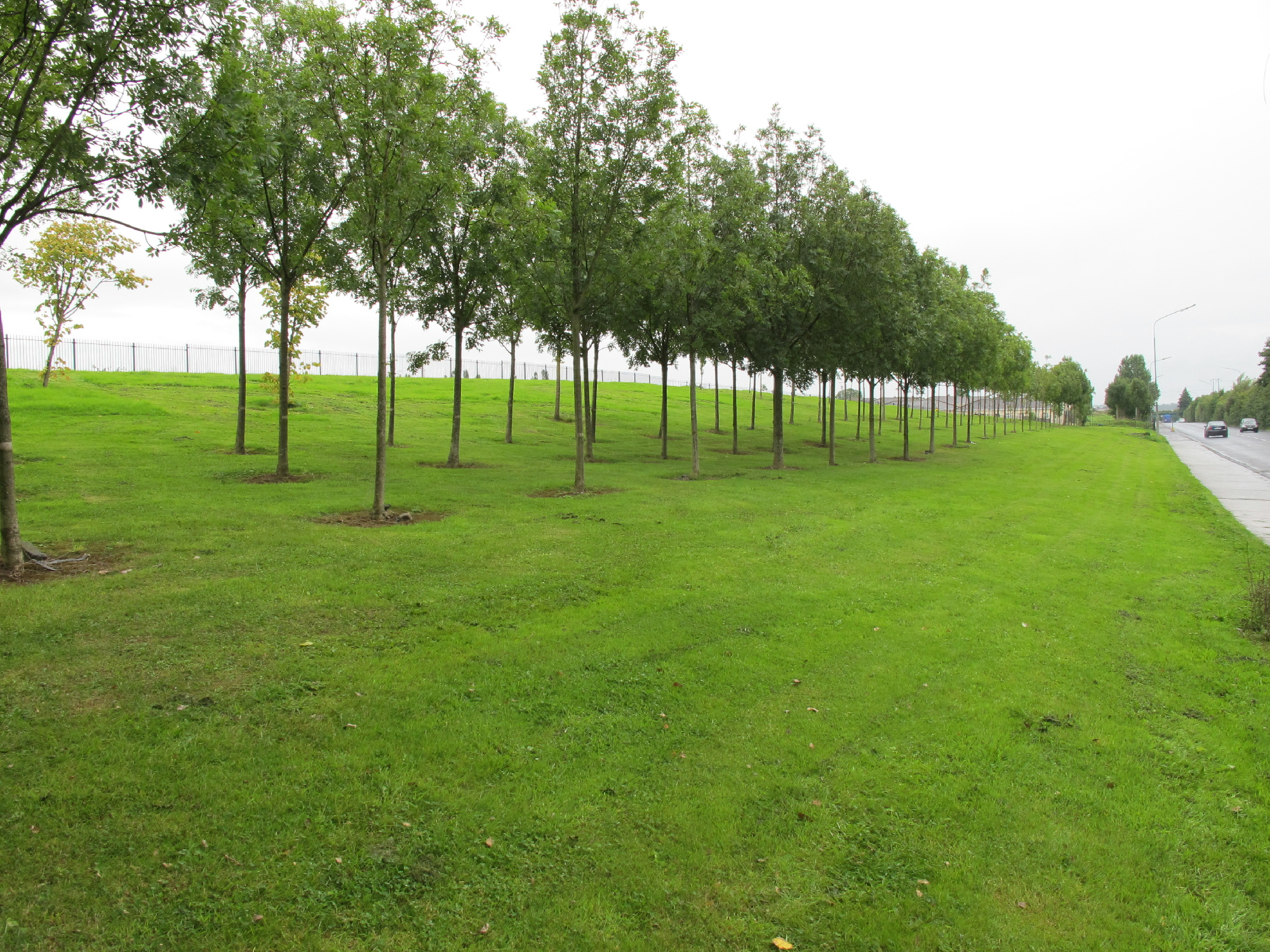
- Childers Road, Limerick, on the R509

Location
- Country: Ireland

Highway system
- Roads in Ireland; Motorways; Primary; Secondary; Regional

The R509 road, the Childers Road (named after Erskine Childers), is a regional road in Ireland, running through the southeastern side of Limerick City. It forms what is somewhat akin to an inner ring road (albeit mostly two-lane only).

== Route ==
The Childers Road was built in several stages to connect various suburbs on that side of the city (it was not originally envisaged as a ring road route). The first section linked the then N20/N21 Ballinacurra Road (from the city centre to Raheen and onwards to Cork/Kerry) to the Greenfields Road, Janesboro and onward to the Roxboro Road/Fedamore Road (R511). The N20/N21 now commences just prior to the Roxboro Roundabout.

The next stage of the road continues on to link with the Old Cork Road (R512). Here it passes under the Limerick–Limerick Junction railway line. The road continues round to the Tipperary Road (N24), meeting at the Tipperary roundabout.

The final stage of the road, the last to be built, connects from the Tipperary roundabout, north to the Dublin Road (N7). The roundabout junction here is located in what is known as the Parkway area. The Parkway roundabout serves Childers Road, Parkway Shopping Centre, Dublin Road, and old Dublin Road/Rhebogue Road.

The final section of Childers Road also has a junction (between the Tipperary and Parkway roundabouts) with the Bloodmill Road (or Old Singland Road). A new retail development, Childers Road Retail Park has been built at this junction, and some of Childers Road upgraded to 3 or 4 lanes. A new junction serves the retail park.

== Discussion ==
Until the opening of the M7 Southern Ring Road (a dual-carriageway running further from the city linking the M7, N18, M20/N21 and N24 roads), the Childers road carried traffic attempting to skirt past Limerick between these routes, in addition to city traffic to and between the various suburbs along the route (e.g. between Castletroy and Raheen). The road thus earned the title "Limerick's car park", and would feature each morning and evening on traffic reports. Traffic levels are now more suited to the road, but due to the new retail park, and increased traffic generally, delays along the route are still frequent.

The R509 is now in its entirety the Childers Road, between the R445 (at the Parkway Shopping Centre on the Dublin Road) and the R526, where it terminates.

The Bus Éireann 308 bus route (city centre to Castletroy/University of Limerick) has a stop on Childers Road near the Bloodmill Road junction. A cycle route runs along part of the Childers Road and is due to be extended as part of a planned scheme of cycleways for Limerick.

A new relief road was opened in 2006 between Plassey roundabout and New Tipperary Road (R527) which should help to alleviate much of the traffic congestion caused by the opening of the Childers Road Retail Park and Parkway Retail Park only 100 metres up the R509.

== See also ==
- Roads in Ireland
- National primary road
- National secondary road
