= A180 highway (Russia) =

Road in Russia

Federal Highway A180
- Федеральная автомобильная дорога А180
- Narva Highway
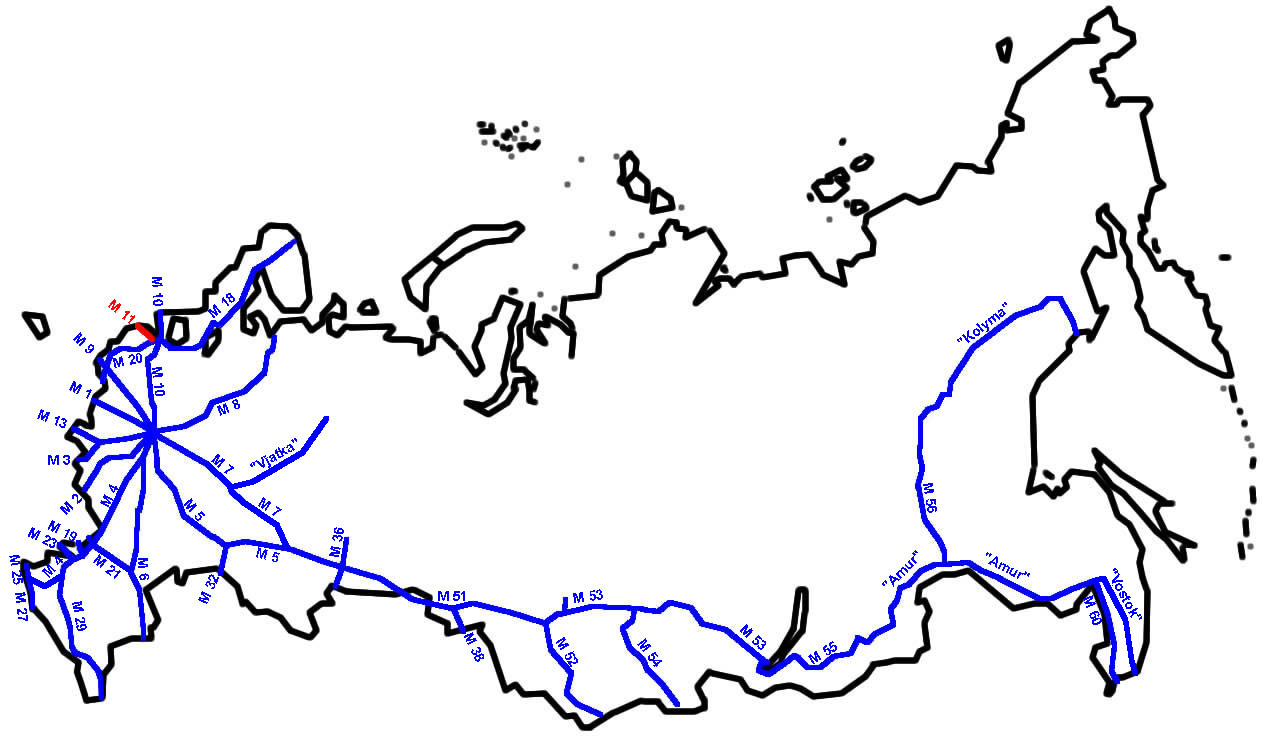

Route information
- Part of E20

Major junctions
- East end: A 118 in Saint Petersburg
- West end: Estonian border

Location
- Country: Russia

Highway system
- Russian Federal Highways
| ← A 167 | → A 181 |

Russian Route A180, also known as Narva Highway (Russian: Федера́льная автомоби́льная доро́га А180 «На́рва», Federal highway A180 "Narva") is a Russian federal highway that runs from Saint Petersburg through Ivangorod up to the border with Estonia by the Narva River, with the Estonian city of Narva on the opposite bank, which explains the name of the highway. It is part of European route E20, making its easternmost stretch.

Up until late 2010, it was designated as М11, which is now the number of the newly planned Moscow–Saint Petersburg motorway.

Since the 2000s the road has been being gradually reconstructed to have four lanes instead of two and to pass around the congested streets of Kransnoye Selo.

The eastern stretch of the highway adjacent to Saint Petersburg, known there as Tallinskoye Highway (Russian: Таллинское Шоссе), is a part of World Heritage Site Historic Centre of Saint Petersburg and Related Groups of Monuments due to its historical significance and multitude of cultural and historical monuments along its course.
