= Arywee =

Townland in County Limerick, Ireland

Arywee Airí Bhuí
- Townland
- Location in Ireland
- Coordinates: 52°34′14″N 8°34′43″W
- Country: Ireland
- Province: Munster
- County: County Limerick

Area
  - Total: 0.58 km^{2} (0.22 sq mi)
- Time zone: UTC+0 (WET)
  - Summer (DST): UTC-1 (IST (WEST))

Arywee is a townland in the parish of Fedamore, in County Limerick, Ireland.

Neighbouring townlands include Carnane to the west, Williamstown to the east, Parkatotaun to the north, and Cloughadoolarty South to the south.

It has an area of approximately 58 hectares (144 acres). It is located 14.4 km (8.9 mi) distance by road from Limerick city centre, in a South South East direction.

The name is an anglicisation from the Irish language "Airí Bhuí", meaning "yellow milking place".

Residents of Arywee entitled to vote may do so for candidates in the Adare-Rathkeale Electoral Area for local elections, the Limerick City (Dáil constituency) constituency for general elections, and the South constituency for European Parliament elections. The polling station for these elections is in nearby Knockea National School.
