= N19 road (Ireland) =

Road in Ireland

Coordinates: 52°42′41″N 8°53′10″W

N19 road
- Bóthar N19

Route information
- Part of
- Length: 3.45 km (2.14 mi)

Location
- Country: Ireland
- Primary destinations: (bypassed routes in italics): County Clare; Shannon; Shannon Airport

Highway system
- Roads in Ireland; Motorways; Primary; Secondary; Regional

The N19 road is a national primary road in Ireland, connecting from the N18 Limerick–Ennis–Galway road to Shannon Airport. It forms part of European route E20.

The route in its current form consists mostly of a dual-carriageway passing around Shannon Town, which starts at an interchange near Hurlers Cross on the N18 road. The dual-carriageway ends on the far side of Shannon Town at the Shannon Free Zone industrial estate, and proceeds as a two lane road to the airport.

Prior to the opening of this new dual-carriageway route in 2004, the route ran along a two-lane road through Shannon town centre itself. A junction without flyovers connected to what was then the end of the dual-carriageway section of the N18 (the dual-carriageway on that route now continues to Galway as a motorway as of September 2017).

Shannon Town can still be accessed from the N18 by use of the remaining portions of this road (connecting only as a slip road from the Limerick direction), as well as a new local link road from a new interchange at Hurler's Cross. The N19 no longer serves Shannon Town for most purposes, apart from the industrial estate.

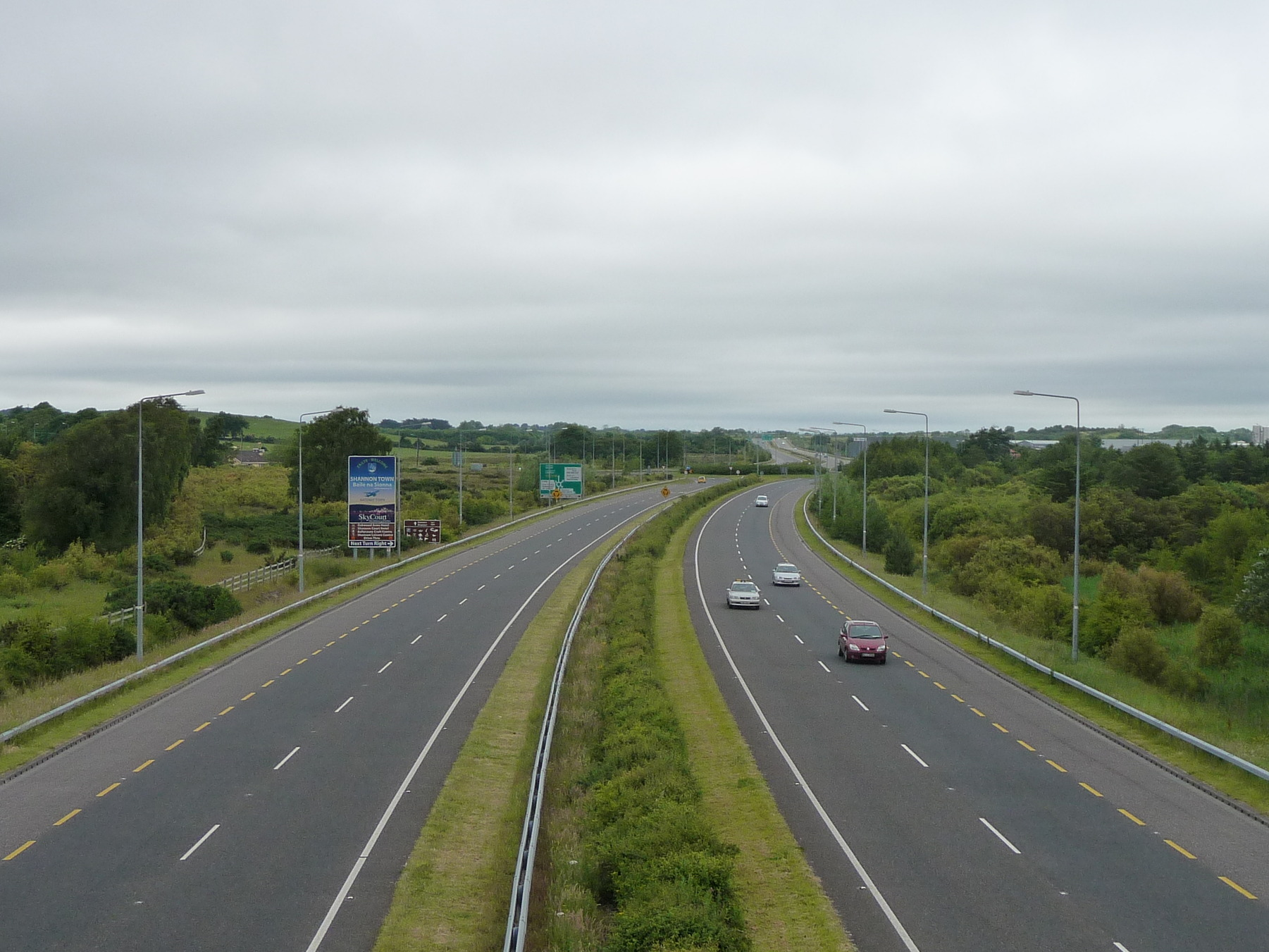
Looking West along the N19 from a pedestrian bridge.

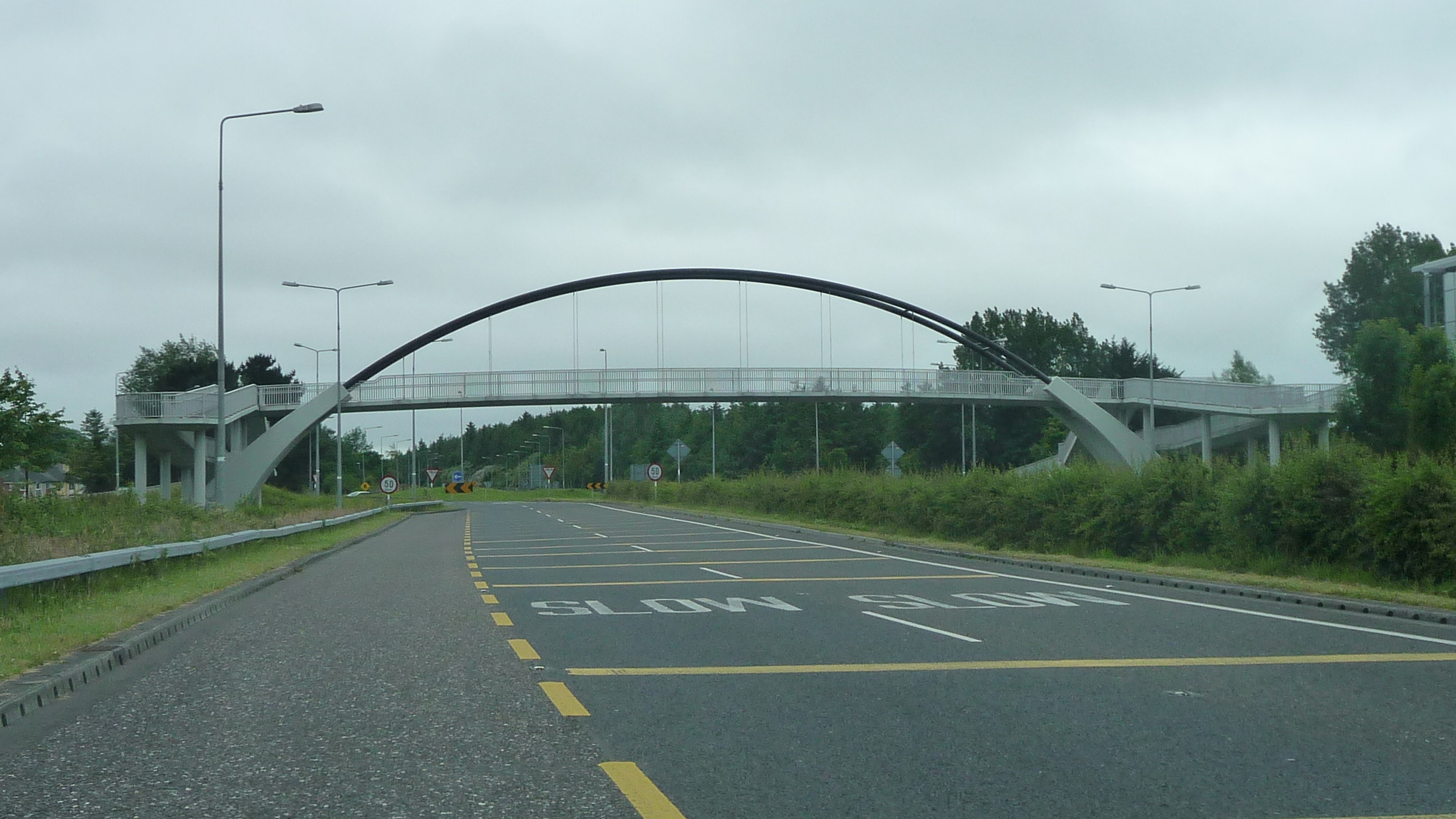
Pedestrian bridge over the N19 Dual Carriageway.

== See also ==
- Roads in Ireland
- Motorways in Ireland
- National secondary road
- Regional road
