= Carnane =

Carnane An Carnán
- Townland
- Location in Ireland
- Coordinates: 52°34′16″N 8°34′53″W
- Country: Ireland
- Province: Munster
- County: County Limerick

Area
  - Total: 1.84 km^{2} (0.71 sq mi)
- Time zone: UTC+0 (WET)
  - Summer (DST): UTC-1 (IST (WEST))

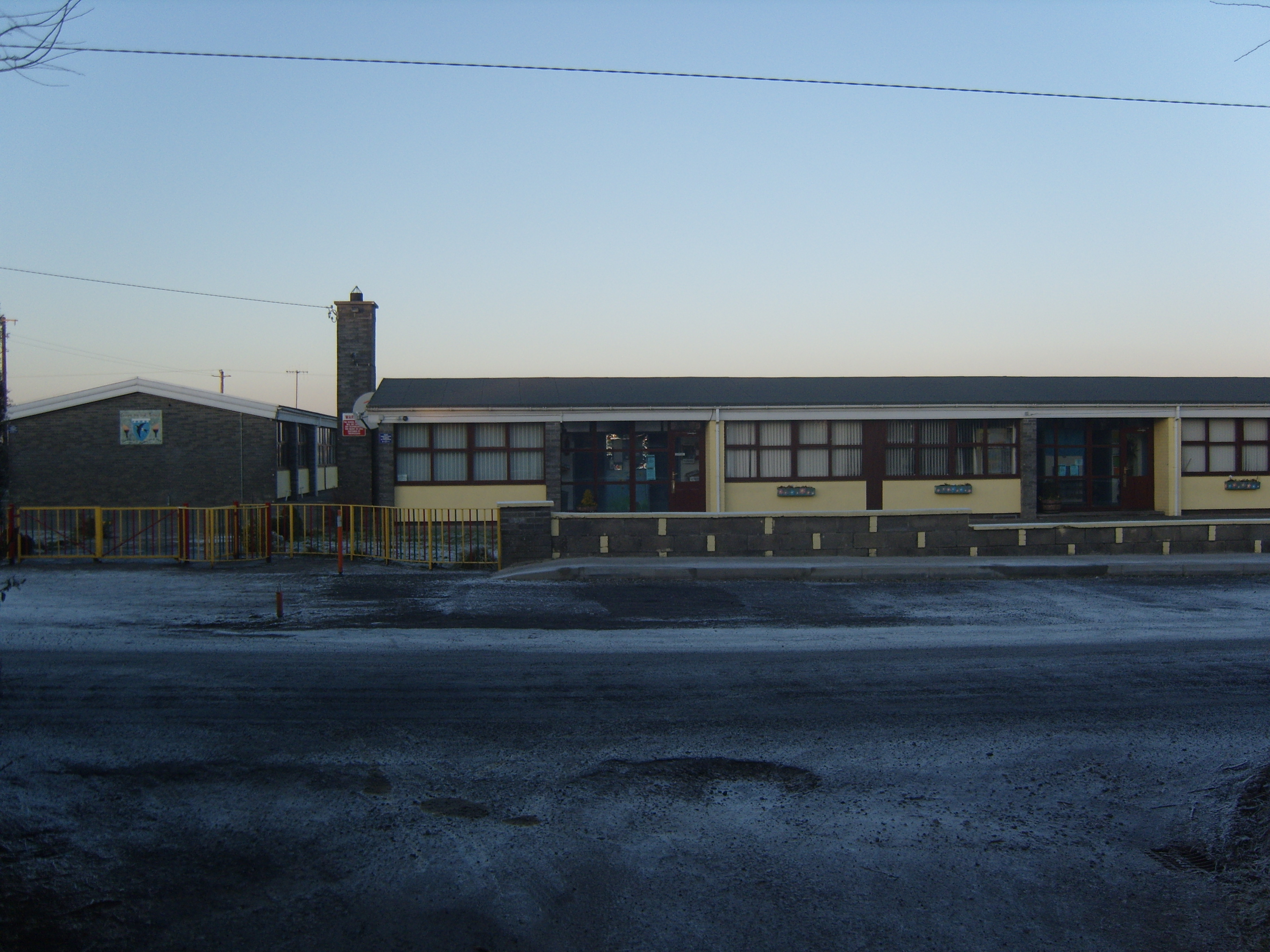
Carnane National School

Carnane is a townland in the parish of Fedamore, in County Limerick, Ireland.

Neighbouring townlands include Fanningstown to the west, Arywee and Williamstown to the east, Boherlode to the north, and Enaghroe and Poultaloon to the south.

It has an area of approximately 184 hectares (455 acres). It is located 13.6 km (8.5 mi) distance by road from Limerick city centre, in a South South East direction.

The name is an anglicisation from the Irish language "An Carnán", meaning "small cairn" (or heap of stones).

Residents of Carnane entitled to vote may do so for candidates in the Adare Local Electoral Area for local elections, the Limerick County constituency for general elections, South constituency for European Parliament elections. The polling station for these elections is in Fedamore National School.

Carnane National School currently has a mixed enrolment of 40 boys and 34 girls. It is under the sponsorship of the Catholic Church.
