= Roxboro, County Limerick =

Roxborough Baile an Róistigh
- Townland
- Location in Ireland
- Coordinates: 52°36′N 8°36′W
- Country: Ireland
- Province: Munster
- County: Limerick

Area
  - Total: 24.02 km^{2} (9.27 sq mi)
- Time zone: UTC+0 (WET)
  - Summer (DST): UTC-1 (IST (WEST))

Roxborough (Irish: Baile an Róistigh) is a townland in County Limerick, Ireland comprising some 24.02 km2. It lies to the south of the townlands of Ballysheedy and Routagh and to the east of the townland of Ballyclough. Its northern boundary, partially bounded by the Ballyclough River, lies some three kilometres to the south of the Limerick City boundary at Southill. The Limerick to Fedamore road (R511) bounds the west side of Roxborough.

Roxborough was historically part of the civil parish of Caheravally and the Barony of Clanwilliam and comprised 526 acres, two roods and five perches. Roxborough is in the Roman Catholic parish of Donoughmore and Knockea, which lies in the Diocese of Limerick. It is also part of the catchment area of South Liberties GAA Club.

Roxborough is designated as an electoral division and contains the following townlands: Ashfort, Ballyclough, Ballysheedy West, Bohereen, Cahervally, Derrybeg, Friarstown, Greenhills, Lemonfield, Lickadoon, Lissanalta, Oatlands, Parkroe, Raheen, Rathuard, Rootiagh, Routagh, Roxborough and Toberyquin. The Roxborough Electoral Division had a population of 1,601 at the Census of Ireland 2011, consisting of 810 males and 791 females and represented a 0.2% decline from the 2006 census.

== History ==
Baile an Róstigh translates as "Roche's townland" and this name almost certainly derives from the Roche family who were associated with King James II. Dominic Roche was ennobled by the King and given large tracts of land in Cahervally, including what is now known as Roxborough. He took the title of Viscount Cahervalla.

During the Cromwellian Plantation, all of the Roche lands, including Roxborough, were confiscated and given to the Hollow Sword Blade Company, which, in spite of its name, was a bank. A Colonel Thomas Vereker of Cork purchased the land from the Hollow Sword Blade Company during the reign of Queen Anne and constructed Roxborough House. According to Spellissy, "he built his mansion in a park laid out with canals, terraces and hedges, in the stiff Dutch fashion." His son, Charles Vereker, was created Viscount Gort in 1817. The property was extensively rebuilt by a Major Vereker in 1832 for approximately £1200. It was placed on the market in June 1852 and again in June 1853, when it was possibly purchased by the McMurray family, who were certainly resident by 1862. In the 1870s, John Ripley McMurray, Sub Lieutenant in the 12th Dragoon Guards, of Roxborough House, Limerick and Patrickswell is recorded as owning 1,931 acres in county Limerick. In 1879, its contents were auctioned and it eventually came into the hands of Alexander W. Shaw of The Shaw Bacon Company, Limerick.

Due to the extensive civil unrest of the period following the Acts of Union in 1800 and the Napoleonic Wars, many police barracks were constructed in the region and one was built at Power's Cross in Roxborough in the 1830s.

== Education ==
According to the history of Roxborough National School, Alexander W. Shaw established a school at a dwelling house in 1889. He was in residence at Roxborough House at this time and this dwelling was in fact the Gate Lodge of that house. This school catered for 64 pupils, 40 girls and 24 boys, and a Ms Briget O'Brien was the first teacher appointed. Construction began on a new school in 1911 and this was opened on 6 May 1912. It is a standard school building type of the period with two classrooms divided by timber and glazed partition. Each room had its own fireplace and the building was fronted by an entrance porch allowing separate access to each room. This building is now on the Limerick County Council list of protected structures. The school continued to grow and a number of prefabricated buildings were added to the site during the 1960s and 1970s. Extensive fundraising, led by the then principal, Sean Marrinan, eventually led to a new school being constructed and opened in 1985. This school is located some 250m south of the 1911 school and is now one of the largest primary schools in Co Limerick.

== Spelling and misuse ==
The spelling of Roxborough has sometimes been shortened to Roxboro, largely due to the modern spelling of the "Roxboro Road" in Limerick City (R511), which runs from the top of William Street all the way out to Roxborough. In more recent years, a number of businesses in the Rathbane and Galvone areas of Limerick City have erroneously begun to use "Roxboro" as their address in the belief that that part of the city was once part of the townland of Roxborough. This has been reinforced by the misuse of Roxborough on directional roadsigns on a section of the N18 from the Limerick Tunnel to the Junction 1 exit. It is clearly evidenced on the Ordnance Survey of Ireland's 6" maps (1829–41) that this is not the case.

== See also ==
- Roxborough, Philadelphia
