= Hurlers Cross =

Village in County Clare, Ireland

Hurlers Cross Crois na hIomána
- Village
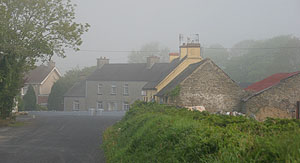
- Hurlers Cross seen from the old road

- Location in Ireland
- Coordinates: 52°43′01″N 8°50′51″W
- Country: Ireland
- Province: Munster
- County: County Clare
- Time zone: UTC+0 (WET)
  - Summer (DST): UTC-1 (IST (WEST))
- Irish Grid Reference: R402624
- Website: www.shannon.ie

Hurlers Cross (Irish: Crois na hIomána) is a small village in County Clare, Ireland. It is situated close to Shannon Town and 6 km (3.7 mi) from both Sixmilebridge and Newmarket-on-Fergus. It forms a part of Newmarket-on-Fergus parish.

== Etymology ==
The name is derived from the meeting of three roads: one to Ennis (and later Shannon), one to Limerick and one to Sixmilebridge. The last named is now closed off at the western end of the village, following the opening of a dual-carriageway bypass (N18/N19) serving the Limerick to Ennis route, which has taken away the heavy traffic that was once a feature of Hurlers Cross.

== See also ==
- List of towns and villages in Ireland
