= Limerick Tunnel =

Road tunnel near Limerick city, Ireland

Coordinates: 52.655°N 8.686°W

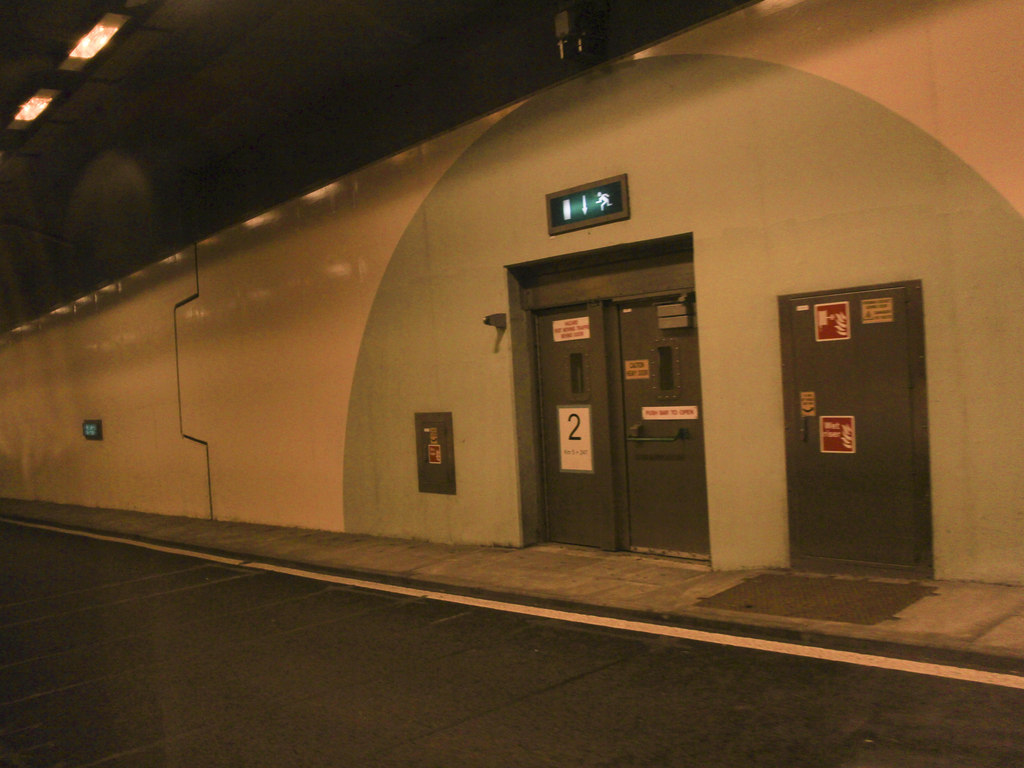
- Emergency exit in Limerick Tunnel

Overview
- Location: Limerick, Ireland, crossing the River Shannon
- Route: N18
- Start: August 2006
- End: June 2010

Operation
- Opened: 27 July 2010
- Toll: €2.30 (cars)

Technical
- Length: 675 metres (740 yd) (immersed tube tunnel section)
- No. of lanes: Two cells of 2 each
- Tunnel clearance: 4.65 metres (15 ft) (external)

The Limerick Tunnel (Irish: Tollán Luimnigh) is a 675-metre-long (2,215 ft), immersed tube tunnel underneath the River Shannon on the outskirts of Limerick city. The tunnel forms part of the N18 Limerick Southern Ring Road. The tunnel is tolled.

== Construction ==
Construction was carried out by a consortium of Strabag, John Sisk & Son Ltd, Lagan Holdings Ltd and Roadbridge Ltd. Traffic and Transportation planning was undertaken by Colin Buchannan and Partners. Dredging work for the tunnel trench was carried out by Dutch company Van Oord. The immersion process of floating the tunnel elements out into the Shannon was carried out by another Dutch company, Mergor.

The total cost of construction was €660 million.

== Opening ==
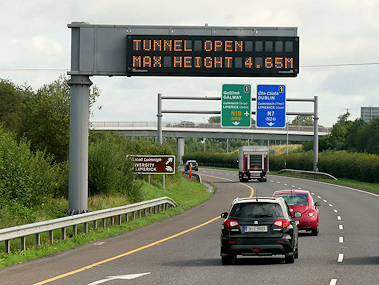
Signage on approach to Limerick, indicating tunnel status

A pedestrian open day was held on 19 June 2010, with official opening to traffic by the Taoiseach, Brian Cowen, on 27 July 2010, two months ahead of schedule.

== Tolling ==
The Austrian EFKON Group commissioned, built and currently operate two toll collection locations, one ten-lane and one six-lane plaza, both staffed.

The tolling locations are both north of the Shannon. One is between junctions 3 and 4 of the N18, and the other is between N18 junction 3 and the Clonmacken Roundabout.

== See also ==
- Jack Lynch Tunnel, on the N40 southern ring road of Cork
- Dublin Port Tunnel
- Atlantic Corridor, ongoing construction of major roads along the west side of Ireland
- Roads in Ireland
