= R527 road (Ireland) =

Road in Ireland

R527 road
- Bóthar R527
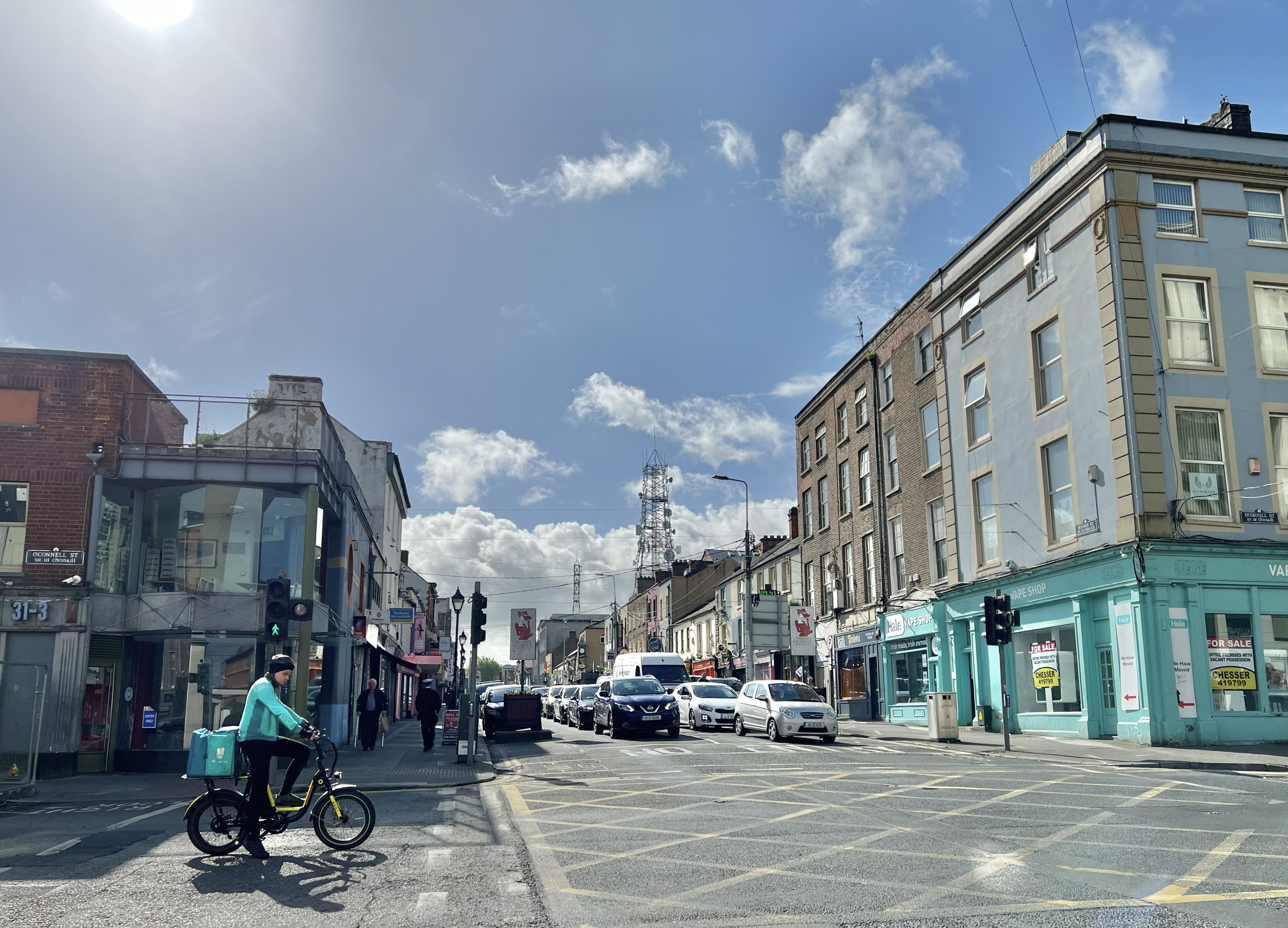
- Junction of O'Connell and Roches Streets, on the R527

Route information
- Length: 9 km (5.6 mi)

Major junctions
- From: R445 at Caherdavin
- Limerick city centre
- To: M7 at Ballysimon

Location
- Country: Ireland

Highway system
- Roads in Ireland; Motorways; Primary; Secondary; Regional

The R527 is a regional road in County Limerick, Ireland. It mainly follows former routes of the N18 and N24 in Limerick city.
