= Fedamore =

Village in County Limerick, Ireland

Fedamore Feadaimir (Irish)
- Village
- Location in Ireland
- Coordinates: 52°32′44″N 08°36′18″W
- Country: Ireland
- Province: Munster
- County: County Limerick

Population (2022)
  - Total: 381
- Time zone: UTC+0 (WET)
  - Summer (DST): UTC-1 (IST (WEST))

Fedamore (Irish: Feadaimir) is a small village in County Limerick, Ireland. As of the 2022 census, Fedamore had a population of 381 people. It is also a civil parish in the ancient barony of Smallcounty.

== Location ==
Fedamore is in east County Limerick 13 km (8 mi) south of the centre of Limerick city. Nearby villages include Crecora, Manister, Croom, Ballyneety and Meanus. The village is just off the R511 road, on a small hill roughly 90 metres in height. Fedamore is in the Limerick County Dáil Éireann constituency and in the Adare/Rathkeale local election constituency.

== History ==
The name Fedamore comes from the Irish Fiadh Damair or Feadaimir, meaning "the wood of Damar", referring to a local Gaelic chieftain. Fairs were held in Fedamore on 5 May and on 9 October. Castles were located at Englishtown, Rockstown and Williamstown and the latter two have ruins still intact. There are remains of an abbey in Friarstown in a field which marks the border between Fedamore and Donoughmore parishes. At Fanningstown and Rockstown, there are old disused graveyards. St. Patrick's well is located at Kilpeacon which is in Fedamore parish although in reality is located far closer to Crecora village. An old well called St. John's well seems to have been lost, as has the mass rock at Rockstown. The present day church was built in 1830.

== Amenities ==
Fedamore has a church, two national schools (at Fedamore and Carnane), one pub, a community hall, a Gaelic Athletic Association field and four housing estates: Cluain Ard, Castlequarter Heights, Ballyea Close and Clohessy Park. Local organisations include a hall committee, Muintir na Tíre, and ICA guild, a pastoral council and a community alert scheme.

== Sports ==
Fedamore GAA, the local Gaelic Athletic Association club, is primarily involved in hurling and has a pitch in Boolavoord. The club won two Limerick Senior Hurling Championships in 1912 and 1927. Fedamore inter-county hurler Paddy Clohessy won All-Ireland Senior Hurling Championships in 1934, 1936 and 1940. The club now competes at Junior A level, while at underage they combine with neighbouring clubs to field teams. Gaelic football is played at Junior B level and Fedamore reached the county final in 2013, but were beaten by Feenagh/Kilmeedy.

Association football (soccer) is also played in the parish and the local team, Castle Rovers, play in Williamstown and compete in Division 2A in the Limerick & District Junior Soccer League. Fedamore Villa is the over-40s soccer side.

Other sports groups in the parish include the Fedamore & District Gun Club, Fedamore Coursing Club, the Fedamore Powerlifting Club and the Fedamore Foot Beagles. Darts tournaments are also held in The Ranch bar.
