= R511 road (Ireland) =

Road in Ireland

Coordinates: 52.553218°N 8.600525°W

R511 road
- Bóthar R511
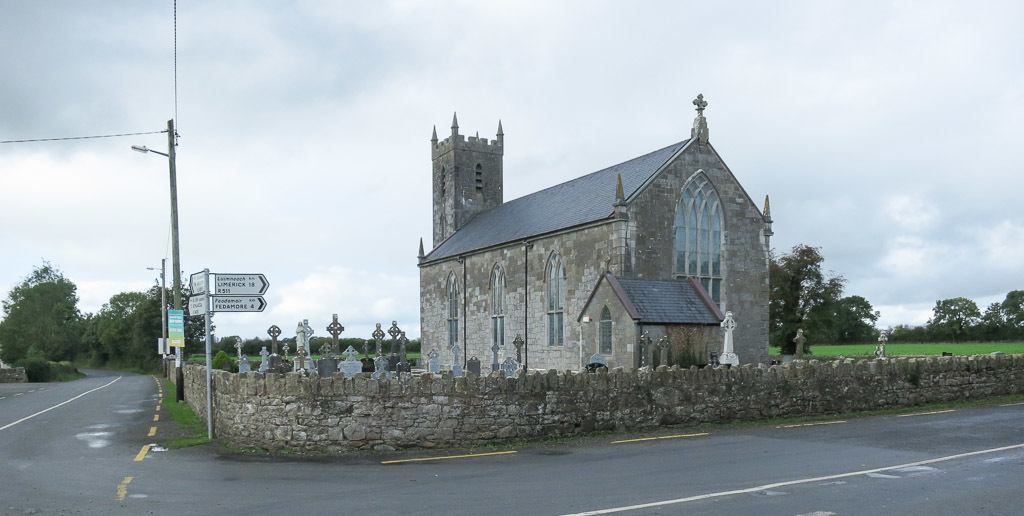
- St. Mary's Church, Meanus, on the R511

Route information
- Length: 17.7 km (11.0 mi)

Major junctions
- From: R527 Limerick (Mulgrave Street)
- Crosses Limerick–Rosslare railway line R509 Limerick (Roxboro Roundabout); Passes over M20; Passes through Fedamore; Passes over River Camogue
- To: R516 Crean (west of Bruff)

Location
- Country: Ireland

Highway system
- Roads in Ireland; Motorways; Primary; Secondary; Regional

The R511 road is a regional road in Ireland, located in central County Limerick.
