= Williamstown, County Limerick =

Williamstown Baile Liam
- Townland
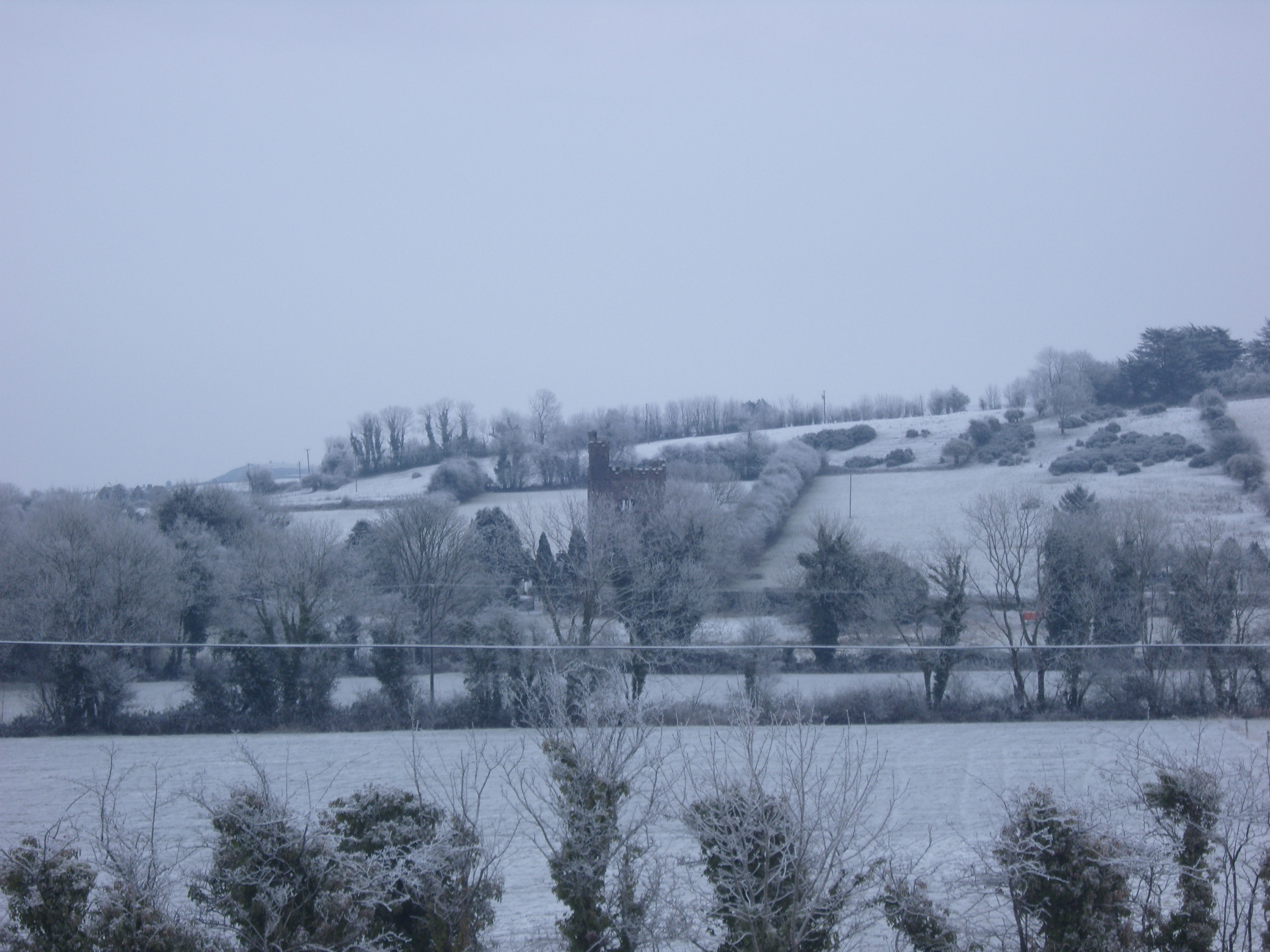
- Williamstown Castle is a nearby 16th century towerhouse

- Location in Ireland
- Coordinates: 52°34′24″N 8°34′12″W
- Country: Ireland
- Province: Munster
- County: County Limerick

Area
  - Total: 0.40 km^{2} (0.15 sq mi)
- Time zone: UTC+0 (WET)
  - Summer (DST): UTC-1 (IST (WEST))

Williamstown (Irish: Baile Liam) is a small townland in the parish of Fedamore, in County Limerick, Ireland.

Neighbouring townlands include Carnane and Arywee to the west, Ballynagarde to the east, Parkatotaun to the north, and Loughlinstown to the south.

The townland has an area of approximately 43 hectares (110 acres). It is located 14.2 km (8.8 mi) south east of Limerick city centre.

Residents of Williamstown entitled to vote may do so for candidates in the Castleconnell Local Electoral Area for local elections, the Limerick County constituency for general elections, South constituency for European Parliament elections. The polling station for these elections is in nearby Caherelly National School.

A four-storey tower house, known as Williamstown Castle, is located in the area.
