= Kilfinaghta =

Civil parish in County Clare, Ireland

Kilfinaghta Cill Fhionnachta
- Civil parish
- Location in Ireland
- Coordinates: 52°44′N 8°44′W
- Country: Ireland
- Province: Munster
- County: County Clare
- Time zone: UTC+0 (WET)
  - Summer (DST): UTC-1 (IST (WEST))

Kilfinaghta (Irish: Cill Fhionnachta) is a civil parish of County Clare, Ireland, located to the east of Sixmilebridge and northeast of Shannon.

== Geography ==
The civil parish of Kilfinaghta lies in the barony of Bunratty Lower. It is in the southeastern part of the county and is bordered by Clonlea to the northeast, O'Brien's Bridge to the east, St. Munchin's to the southeast, Killeely to the southeast, Kilfintinan to the south, Feenagh to the southwest and Kilmurry to the northwest. It is divided into 31 townlands:

- Ardmaclancy
- Ballycullen
- Ballymulcashel
- Ballynevan
- Ballyroe
- Ballysheen Beg
- Ballysheen More
- Bunnabinnia North
- Bunnabinnia South
- Cappaghcastle
- Cappaghlodge
- Cappagh North
- Cappagh South
- Cappanalaght
- Castlecrine
- Castlelake
- Cloonanass
- Clogga
- Coolycasey
- Corlea
- Curraghkilleen
- Fortwilliam
- Ieverstown
- Kilnacreagh
- Moygalla
- Mountcashel
- Mountievers
- Pollagh
- Reaskcamoge
- Sooreeny
- Sixmilebridge
