= Kilmurry-Negaul =

Village in County Clare, Ireland

Kilmurry-Negaul Cill Mhuire na nGall
- Civil parish
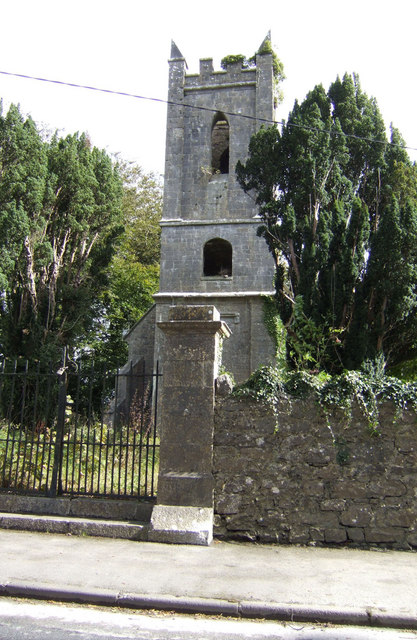
- Disused church at Kilmurry by the R462 Sixmilebridge road

- Location in Ireland
- Coordinates: 52.7778°N 8.7828°W
- Country: Ireland
- Province: Munster
- County: County Clare
- Elevation: 45 m (148 ft)

Population (2022)
  - Total: 229
- (Kilmurry village)
- Time zone: UTC+0 (WET)
  - Summer (DST): UTC-1 (IST (WEST))
- Irish Grid Reference: Q807509

Kilmurry-Negaul (Irish: Cill Mhuire na nGall (Note: The name Cill Mhuire na nGall, meaning 'Church of Mary of the Standing Stone', had probably become obsolete by the 17th century. However, in the 20th century it was revived, and helps distinguish this parish from the many other places named Kilmurry.)) is a civil parish and a village in County Clare, Ireland.

== Location ==
Kilmurry-Negaul is a civil parish containing a village with the name Kilmurry. It was within the barony of Tulla Upper, but as of 1845 had recently been transferred to the barony of Bunratty Lower. Today, the village of Kilmurry in the civil parish of Kilmurry-Negaul falls within the Kilkishen Electoral Division, which is part of the Shannon Local Electoral Area under the jurisdiction of Clare County Council.

It is 3.5 by 1.5 miles (5.6 by 2.4 km) and covers 2,917 acres (1,180 ha). The village of Kilmurry is 2.5 miles (4.0 km) north of Sixmilebridge on the road to Quin. There is a large tract of fine arable country of a light limestone where the parishes of Quinn, Clonlea and Kilmurry-Negral meet.

== Antiquity ==
The name Kilmurry means "Church of the Virgin Mary", but originally the parish may have been dedicated to an Irish saint. A holy well near the old church is dedicated to Saint Tobar Faoile. The castle of Rossroe, well-preserved in 1897, belonged to Fineen, son of Loghlen MacNamara, in 1580. The castle of Drumullan was in 1580 the property of Covea, son of Mahone MacNamara. The parish lay in MacNamara territory, and the families of this powerful sect would not abandon the Catholic faith.

During the reign of King William III of England (1689–1702) John Lawson, an Englishman, was given the rectories of Quin, Tulloo, Cluony, Dowry, Templemaley, Kilraghtis and Kilmurry-Negaul. Opposite the record of this appointment was the note, "No cure served at present; noe church in repaire; the country all wast." These had been seven of the best parishes in the county.

On 18 March 1790, the vicarages of Kilseily, Bunratty, Clonlea, Clonloghan, Finogh, Kilconry, Killuran, Kilfinaghty, Kilmurrynegaul, Kilnoe and Tomfinlough were episcopally united in the Church of Ireland. In 1810, the Church of Ireland rectory of Kilmurraynegaul was valued in the King's books at £0.6.8 sterling. It was one of the parishes that made up the Union of Kilseily. As of 1837, the civil parish was part of the Catholic union of Sixmilebridge.

The population was 980 in 1821 and had fallen to 628 in 1831. In 1841, the population had risen to 699 in 101 houses. The old burial ground in the village had the ruins of an old church in 1837. By 1897, all traces of the church had gone, but the graveyard surrounding it remained in use.

== Townlands ==
The townlands are Cloonmunnia, Cragroe, Drumullan, Kilcornan, Kilkishen, Kilkishen Demesne, Kilmurry, Knocknalappa, Rosroe, Shandangan East, and Shandangan West.
