= Jack Shalloo (hurler) =

Irish hurler and Gaelic footballer

Personal information
- Native name: Seán Ó Sealbhaigh (Irish)
- Born: 27 May 1886 Killuran, County Clare, Ireland
- Died: 14 June 1932 (aged 46) O'Callaghans Mills, County Clare, Ireland
- Occupation: Farmer

Sport
- Sport: Hurling
- Position: Full-back
Club
- Years: Club
- O'Callaghan's Mills
Club titles
- Clare titles: 5
Inter-county
- Years: County
- Clare
Inter-county titles
- Munster titles: 1
- All-Irelands: 1

John Shalloo (27 May 1886 – 14 June 1932) was an Irish hurler. At club level he played with O'Callaghan's Mills, and also lined out at inter-county level with the Clare senior hurling team.

== Career ==
Shalloo first played hurling in his local area with the O'Callaghan's Mills club. During a golden age for the club, he was part of the Clare SHC-winning teams in 1904, 1906, 1909, 1910 and 1918. Shalloo's performances at club level quickly earned him a call-up to the Clare senior hurling team. He won a Munster SHC medal in 1914, before later lining out at full-back in Clare's defeat of Laois in the 1914 All-Ireland final.

== Death ==
Shalloo died following a drowning accident at Kilgorey Lake near O'Callaghan's Mills on 14 June 1932, at the age of 46.

== Honours ==
O'Callaghan's Mills

- Clare Senior Hurling Championship: 1904, 1906, 1909, 1910, 1918

Clare

- All-Ireland Senior Hurling Championship: 1914
- Munster Senior Hurling Championship: 1914
