= O'Callaghan's Mills (parish) =

Catholic parish in County Clare, Ireland

- Roman Catholic parish
- Location in Ireland
- Coordinates: 52°50′31.2″N 8°41′7.8″W
- Country: Ireland
- Province: Munster
- County: County Clare
- Time zone: UTC+0 (WET)
  - Summer (DST): UTC-1 (IST (WEST))

O'Callaghan's Mills, also named O’Callaghan’s Mills & Kilkishen, is a parish in County Clare, Ireland, and part of the Ceantar na Lochanna grouping of parishes within the Roman Catholic Diocese of Killaloe. The parish is an amalgamation of the medieval parishes of Clonlea and Killuran plus some townlands taken over from other parishes.

As of 2022, the co-parish priest is Donal Dwyer.

== Churches ==
The parish has three churches.

The main church is the Church of St. Patrick in O'Callaghan's Mills. It is a cruciform building built in 1839. In 1979-1980 it was renovated and refurbished which gave the church a completely different look. Local tradition claims that there was a chapel on this location, built 100 years earlier.

The second church is the St. Senan's church in Kilkishen. Its history is unclear with the church already mentioned in 1811. At that time it was the focus of a brawl over the seating arrangements. In 1865 the church was rededicated after an enlargement and renovation.

The third church of the parish is the St. Vincent de Paul's Church in Oatfield. The church was built in 1830 and replaced an earlier thatched chapel. In 1839 the church was victim of the Night of the Big Wind and lost its roof. The congregation decided to enlarge the church and add two transepts before placing the new roof, instead of just repairing.

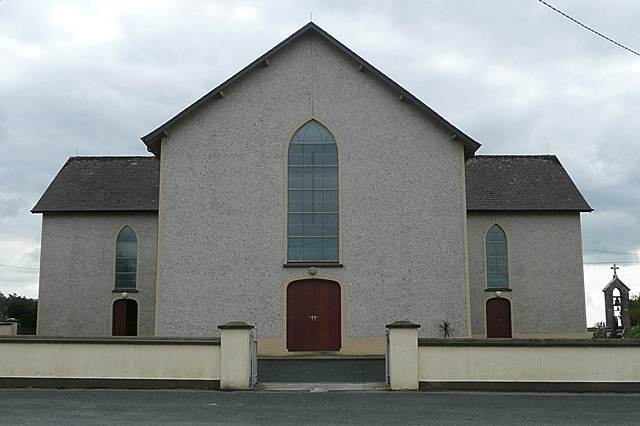
Church of St. Patrick, O'Callaghan's Mills

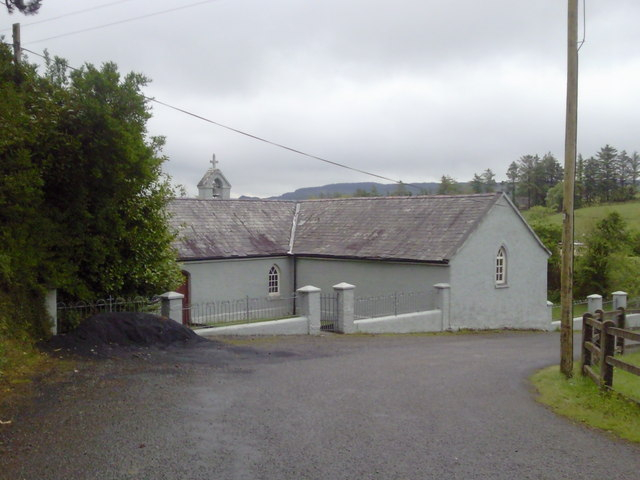
St. Vincent de Paul's Church, Oatfield
