= Tulla Lower =

- Location within Ireland
- Coordinates: 52.758737°N 8.625855°W
- Country: Ireland
- Province: Munster
- County: Clare

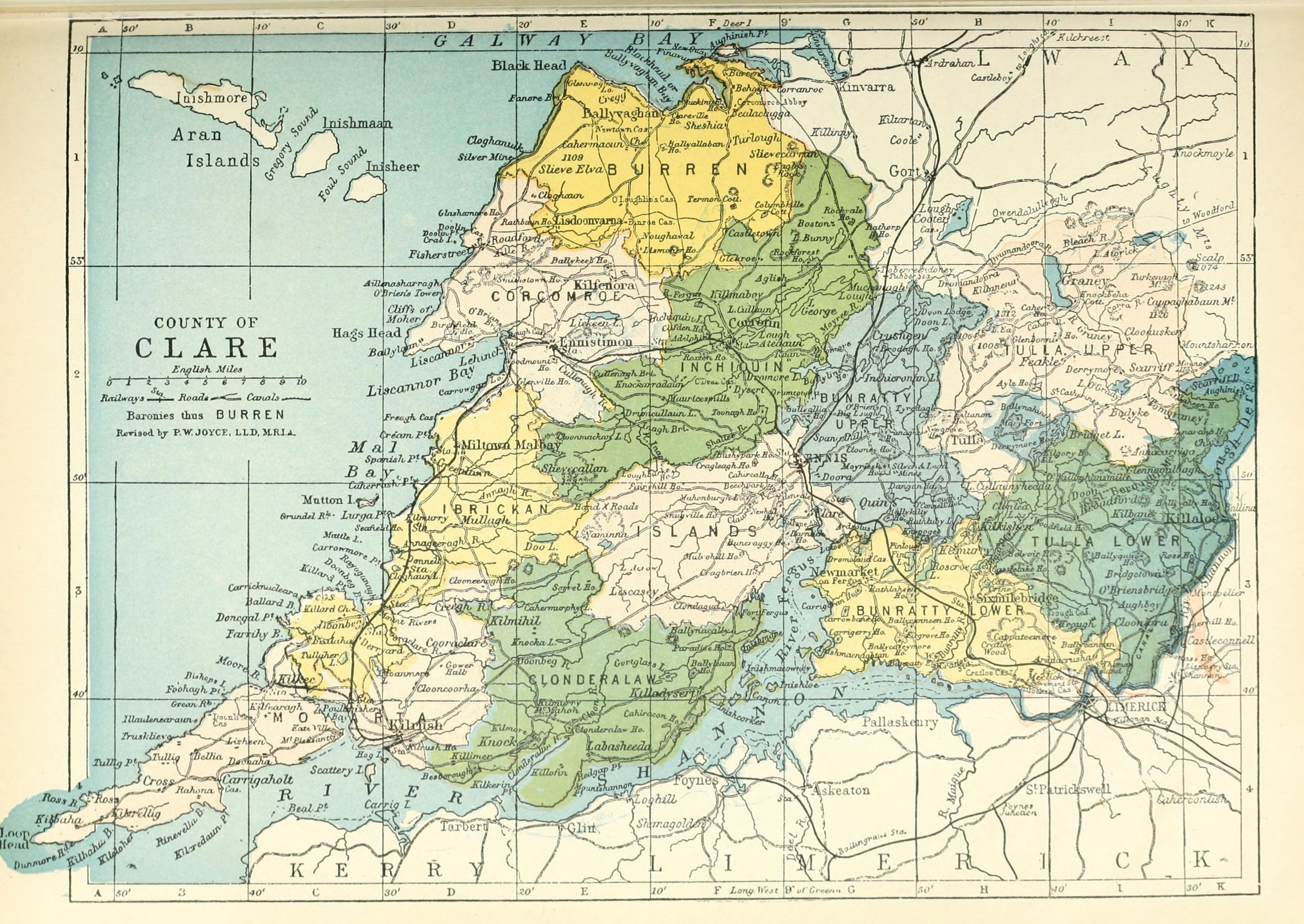
Baronies of Clare. Tulla Lower is in the southeast.

Tulla Lower (or Tullagh Lower) is a barony in County Clare, Ireland. This ancient geographical division of land is in turn divided into eight civil parishes.

== Legal context ==
Baronies were created after the Norman invasion of Ireland as divisions of counties and were used the administration of justice and the raising of revenue. While baronies continue to be officially defined units, they have been administratively obsolete since 1898. However, they continue to be used in land registration and in specification, such as in planning permissions. In many cases, a barony corresponds to an earlier Gaelic túath which had submitted to the Crown.

== Location ==
Tulla Lower lies in the south-east of County Clare. As late as 1831, it was united with Tulla Upper as a single barony.

The barony is bounded to the east by Lough Derg and the River Shannon which separates it from the counties of Tipperary and Tipperary. Within the county of Clare, it is bounded by the baronies of Bunratty Lower (to the south-west), Bunratty Lower (to the west), Bunratty Upper (to the north-west) and by Tulla Upper (to the north). The narrow waters of Lough Cullaunyheeda separates the barony from its neighbour, Bunratty Upper.

It covers 78,381 acres (31,720 ha) of which 5,416 acres (2,192 ha) are water.

== Terrain ==
Much of the barony is moorish upland, but the lands along the Shannon and in the south are good farmland. The highest points are Glennagalliagh, in the parish of Killaloe, at 1,746 feet (532 m) and Cragnamurragh, on the border of the parishes of Killokennedy and O'Brien's Bridge, at 1,729 feet (527 m). The loughs (lakes) of Bridget, Derrynone, Kilglory, Cullaunyheeda and Castle lie on the boundary of the baronry, and the loughs of Doon, Aroher, Clonlea, and Cloonbrick are in the interior.

== Parishes and settlements ==
The barony contains the civil parishes of Clonlea, Killaloe, Killokennedy, Killurin, Kilseily, Kiltonanlea, O'Brien's Bridge, and Ogonnelloe. The main settlements are Killaloe, O'Brien's Bridge, Kilkishen, Kilbane, O'Callaghan’s Mills, Broadford, Cloonlara and Bridgetown.
