= Clonlara (disambiguation) =

Clonlara is a village in County Clare in Ireland.

Clonlara or Cloonlara may also refer to:

== Associated with the County Clare village ==
- Clonlara (parish), a Roman Catholic parish
- Cloonlara, a townland; see List of townlands of County Clare
- Clonlara GAA, a hurling club

== Townlands elsewhere in Ireland ==
- County Galway (see List of townlands of County Galway):
  - Cloonlara North, north of Glennamaddy
  - Cloonlara South, east of Glennamaddy
- County Kerry: Cloonlara, near Farranfore; see List of townlands of County Kerry
- County Limerick: Cloonlara, near Dromcolliher; see List of townlands of County Limerick
- County Mayo (see List of townlands of County Mayo):
  - Cloonlara, between Claremorris and Ballyhaunis
  - Cloonlara, near Swinford

== Other uses ==
- Clonlara School, an alternative school in Michigan, United States
- Cloonlara (horse), a Thoroughbred racehorse
