= Fennagh =

Fennagh, Fenagh or Feenagh may refer to:

== Places ==
- Feenagh, County Clare, a civil parish in County Clare, Ireland
- Feenagh, County Limerick, Ireland
- Fenagh, County Leitrim, a civil parish in County Leitrim, Ireland
- Fennagh, County Carlow, Ireland
- Fenagh (crater), a crater on Mars

== Other uses ==
- Book of Fenagh, a manuscript of prose and poetry written in Classical Irish at Fenagh, County Leitrim
