= Henry Gillespie =

Henry Gillespie may refer to:

- Henry Gillespie (priest)
- Henry Gillespie (baseball)
