= 2019 Clare Senior Hurling Championship =

Annual hurling competition season

Canon Hamilton Cup 2019
- League: Clare GAA
- Sport: Hurling
- Duration: 3 August – 13 October 2019
- Number of teams: 16
- Sponsor: Pat O’Donnell & Co.

Changes From 2018
- Promoted: Feakle
- Relegated: St. Joseph's, Doora-Barefield

Changes For 2020
- Promoted: Broadford
- Relegated: Tulla

County Championship
- Winners: Sixmilebridge (14th Title)
- Runners-up: Cratloe

Senior B Championship
- Winners: Clooney-Quin

The 2019 Clare Senior Hurling Championship was the 124th staging of the Clare Senior Hurling Championship since its establishment by the Clare County Board in 1887.

The defending champions and holders of the Canon Hamilton Cup were Ballyea.

== Senior Championship Fixtures ==
=== First round ===
- Eight winners advance to Round 2A (winners)
- Eight losers move to Round 2B (Losers)

| 3 August 2019 Round 1 | Ballyea | 3–23 2–19 (AET) | Clooney-Quin | Cusack Park, Ennis |

| 3 August 2019 Round 1 | Clarecastle | 0–09 4–15 | Sixmilebridge | Cusack Park, Ennis |

| 3 August 2019 Round 1 | Clonlara | 1–18 1–10 | O'Callaghan's Mills | O'Garney Park, Sixmilebridge |

| 3 August 2019 Round 1 | Cratloe | 0–29 – 4–12 | Whitegate | Broadford |

| 3 August 2019 Round 1 | Éire Óg, Ennis | 1–18 0–20 (AET) | Kilmaley | Clarecastle |

| 3 August 2019 Round 1 | Feakle | 2–12 – 1–13 | Newmarket-on-Fergus | O'Garney Park, Sixmilebridge |

| 3 August 2019 Round 1 | Inagh-Kilnamona | 1–24 – 1–10 | Tulla | Shannon |

| 4 August 2019 Round 1 | Crusheen | 3–18 – 2–05 | Wolfe Tones, Shannon | Cusack Park, Ennis |

=== Second round ===
==== A. Winners ====
- Played by eight winners of Round 1
  - Four winners of this round advance to Quarter-finals
  - Four losers move to Round 3

| 17 August 2019 Round 2A | Ballyea | 0–17 2–21 | Sixmilebridge | Cusack Park, Ennis |

| 17 August 2019 Round 2A | Clonlara | 3–16 – 1–16 | Éire Óg, Ennis | Broadford |

| 17 August 2019 Round 2A | Crusheen | 2–20 – 1–14 | Feakle | Cusack Park, Ennis |

| 18 August 2019 Round 2A | Cratloe | 1–13 1–17 | Inagh-Kilnamona | Cusack Park, Ennis |

==== B. Losers ====
- Played by eight losers of Round 1
  - Four winners of this round advance to Round 3
  - Four losers of this round divert to Relegation Playoffs

| 17 August 2019 Round 2B | Clarecastle | 0–12 – 1–25 | Clooney-Quin | Shannon |

| 17 August 2019 Round 2B | Kilmaley | 3–18 – 0–06 | Whitegate | O'Garney Park, Sixmilebridge |

| 17 August 2019 Round 2B | Newmarket-on-Fergus | 1–17 1–12 | O'Callaghan's Mills | O'Garney Park, Sixmilebridge |

| 17 August 2019 Round 2B | Tulla | 0–14 – 1–14 | Wolfe Tones, Shannon | Clarecastle |

=== Third round ===
- Played by four losers of Round 2A & four winners of Round 2B
  - Four winners of this round advance to the Quarter-finals
  - Four losers divert to Senior B Championship

| 31 August 2019 Round 3 | Ballyea | 2–24 0–14 | Wolfe Tones, Shannon | O'Garney Park, Sixmilebridge |

| 31 August 2019 Round 3 | Clooney-Quin | 1–21 – 3–17 | Feakle | Cusack Park, Ennis |

| 31 August 2019 Round 3 | Éire Óg, Ennis | 2–13 1–14 | Newmarket-on-Fergus | Cusack Park, Ennis |

| 1 September 2019 Round 3 | Cratloe | 1–16 0–12 | Kilmaley | Cusack Park, Ennis |

=== Quarter-finals ===
- Played by four winners of Round 2A and four winners of Round 3

| 14 September 2019 Quarter-final | Clonlara | 2–11 0–18 | Cratloe | Cusack Park, Ennis |

| 14 September 2019 Quarter-final | Éire Óg, Ennis | 1–19 3–16 | Sixmilebridge | Cusack Park, Ennis |

| 14 September 2019 Quarter-final | Feakle | 1–26 – 1–28 (AET) | Inagh-Kilnamona | O'Garney Park, Sixmilebridge |

| 15 September 2019 Quarter-final | Ballyea | 2–11 0–18 | Crusheen | Cusack Park, Ennis |

=== Semi-finals ===
| 28 September 2019 Semi-final | Inagh-Kilnamona | 0–15 0–18 | Sixmilebridge | Cusack Park, Ennis |

| 29 September 2019 Semi-final | Cratloe | 3–24 2–12 | Crusheen | Cusack Park, Ennis |

== 2019 County Final ==
| 13 October 2019 Final | Cratloe | 0–15 – 0–21 | Sixmilebridge | Cusack Park, Ennis |
| | Shane Gleeson (0–5, 3f); Diarmuid Ryan (0–3); Rian Considine, Cathal McInerney (0–2 each); Conor McGrath, Enda Boyce, Billy Connors (f) (0–1 each) | Report | Alex Morey (0–8, 7f); Cathal Malone (0–4); Brian Corry, Jamie Shanahan, Conor Deasy (0–2 each); Jason Loughnane, Shane Golden, Barry Fitzpatrick (0–1 each) | Referee: Niall Malone (Éire Óg, Ennis) |

| Cratloe | Sixmilebridge |

== Other Fixtures ==
=== Senior B Championship ===
- Played by four losers of Round 3

| 15 September 2019 B Semi-final | Clooney-Quin | 2–20 – 2–14 | Wolfe Tones, Shannon | Gurteen |

| 21 September 2019 B Semi-final | Kilmaley | ? - ? | Newmarket-on-Fergus | Clarecastle |

| 27 September 2019 B Final | Clooney-Quin | 2–12 – 0–12 | Newmarket-on-Fergus | O'Garney Park, Sixmilebridge |

=== Relegation Playoffs ===
- Played by the four losers of Round 2B
  - Win once to remain in Senior Championship for 2020
  - Lose twice and relegated to Intermediate for 2020

| 31 August 2019 Playoff 1A | Clarecastle | 1–19 – 1–12 | Tulla | O'Garney Park, Sixmilebridge |

| 31 August 2019 Playoff 1B | O'Callaghan's Mills | 1–15 – 3–18 | Whitegate | Broadford |

| 14 September 2019 Playoff 2 | O'Callaghan's Mills | 0–18 – 1–11 | Tulla | O'Garney Park, Sixmilebridge |
