= St. Munchin's =

St. Munchin's takes its name from Saint Munchin, the first bishop of Limerick. It may refer to:

- St Munchin's College, a second-level education college located in the Limerick city suburb of Corbally
- St. Munchin's Parish, a civil parish lying partly in County Limerick and partly in County Clare
