= Richard Wight =

Anglican priest

Richard Wight was an Anglican priest in Ireland in the 18th century.

Wight was educated at Trinity College, Dublin. He was a prebendary of Ballycahane in Limerick Cathedral from 1715 to 1720; and then of Killeedy from 1720 to 1740; archdeacon of Limerick from 1740 to 1751; and prebendary of St. Munchin's in Limerick Cathedral from 1754 until his death in 1762.
