= 2020 Clare Senior Hurling Championship =

Annual hurling competition season

Canon Hamilton Cup 2020
- League: Clare GAA
- Sport: Hurling
- Duration: 24 July - 27 September 2020
- Number of teams: 16
- Sponsor: Pat O’Donnell & Co.

Changes From 2019
- Promoted: Broadford
- Relegated: Tulla

Changes For 2021
- Promoted: Scarriff
- Relegated: N/A

County Championship
- Winners: Sixmilebridge (15th Title)
- Runners-up: O'Callaghan's Mills

Senior B Championship
- Winners: Clonlara

The 2020 Clare Senior Hurling Championship was the 125th staging of the Clare Senior Hurling Championship since its establishment by the Clare County Board in 1887. The championship was postponed indefinitely due to the coronavirus pandemic in Ireland. The draw for the opening round fixtures eventually took place on 1 July 2020. The championship began on 24 July 2020 and concluded on 27th September 2020.

Sixmilebridge retained their 2019 title by defeating near-neighbours O'Callaghan Mills in the 2020 final who were contesting their first final since 1993 which they ironically also lost to Sixmilebridge.

== Format Change ==
Time constraints led to a revision of the championship format, most notably the abolition of Round 3. The championship saw eight first-round games with the winners of these ties being drawn against the losers for the second round. The eight winners of the Round 2 games advance to the quarter-finals with open draws applying to all rounds. The eight losing teams from Round 2 entered the Clare Senior B Championship. There will be no relegation.

== Senior Championship Fixtures ==
=== First round ===
- Eight winners advance to Round 2 as top seeds
- Eight losers advance to Round 2 as second seeds

24 July 2020 Round 1	Clonlara	0-19 1-14	Newmarket-on-Fergus	O'Garney Park, Sixmilebridge

24 July 2020 Round 1	Clooney-Quin	0-14 2-17	Inagh-Kilnamona	Cusack Park, Ennis

25 July 2020 Round 1	Broadford	0-17 2-13	O'Callaghan's Mills	Cusack Park, Ennis

25 July 2020 Round 1	Clarecastle	0-16 4-19	Wolfe Tones, Shannon	O'Garney Park, Sixmilebridge

25 July 2020 Round 1	Cratloe	3-15 2-11	Kilmaley	Cusack Park, Ennis

25 July 2020 Round 1	Éire Óg, Ennis	0-12 0-17	Sixmilebridge	Cusack Park, Ennis

25 July 2020 Round 1	Feakle	0-21 0-16	Whitegate	O'Garney Park, Sixmilebridge

26 July 2020 Round 1	Ballyea	0-16 0-14	Crusheen	Cusack Park, Ennis

=== Second round ===
- Eight winners from Round 1 are seeded
- Eight losers from Round 2 are unseeded
  - Eight winners advance to Quarter-Finals
  - Eight losers move to Senior B Championship

7 August 2020 Round 2	Inagh-Kilnamona	1-21 1-14	Newmarket-on-Fergus	Cusack Park, Ennis

8 August 2020 Round 2	Clarecastle	2-12 5-20	Feakle	Cusack Park, Ennis

8 August 2020 Round 2	Kilmaley	4-13 1-17	Wolfe Tones, Shannon	Cusack Park, Ennis

8 August 2020 Round 2	Sixmilebridge	0-20 1-13	Whitegate	Cusack Park, Ennis

9 August 2020 Round 2	Ballyea	2-28 0-11	Clooney-Quin	O'Garney Park, Sixmilebridge

9 August 2020 Round 2	Broadford	0-17 0-15	Clonlara	Cusack Park, Ennis

9 August 2020 Round 2	Crusheen	0-17 3-17	O'Callaghan's Mills	Cusack Park, Ennis

9 August 2020 Round 2	Cratloe	P	Éire Óg, Ennis	Shannon

The original fixture between Cratloe and Éire Óg was postponed due to an outbreak of COVID-19 within both the Cratloe and Clondegad communities. After an emergency meeting of the Clare County Board it was agreed to postpone any game that the Cratloe Senior and Junior, and Clondegad Junior teams were due to play by a period of two weeks. All subsequent games involving these clubs or their conquerors would also be delayed down the line due to this decision. This would allow sufficient time for those affected to recover before returning to play.

23 August 2020 Round 2	Cratloe	0-15 1-18	Éire Óg, Ennis	Cusack Park, Ennis

=== Quarter-finals ===
- Played by eight winners of Round 2

22 August 2020 Quarter-Final	Ballyea	1-20 1-14	Kilmaley	Cusack Park, Ennis

22 August 2020 Quarter-Final	Broadford	0-12 0-21	Sixmilebridge	Cusack Park, Ennis

23 August 2020 Quarter-Final	Inagh-Kilnamona	0-13 2-16	O'Callaghan's Mills	Cusack Park, Ennis

5 September 2020 Quarter-Final	Éire Óg, Ennis	1-18 1-13	Feakle	Cusack Park, Ennis

=== Semi-finals ===
12 September 2020 Semi-Final	Éire Óg, Ennis	1-13 0-17	Sixmilebridge	Cusack Park, Ennis

13 September 2020 Semi-Final	Ballyea	1-17 2-17	O'Callaghan's Mills	Cusack Park, Ennis

== 2020 County Final ==
27 September 2020 Final	O'Callaghan's Mills	0-12 0-20	Sixmilebridge	Cusack Park, Ennis

O'Callaghan's Mills	Sixmilebridge

== Other Fixtures ==
=== Senior B Championship ===
- Played by eight losers of Round 2

22 August 2020 B Quarter-Final	Clarecastle	1-17 - 2-10	Whitegate	Tulla

23 August 2020 B Quarter-Final	Newmarket-on-Fergus	1-14 - 1-12	Wolfe Tones, Shannon	Newmarket-on-Fergus

25 August 2020 B Quarter-Final	Clooney-Quin	3-17 - 1-25 (AET)	Crusheen	Clareabbey

4 September 2020 B Quarter-Final	Clonlara	4-34 - 0-06	Cratloe	Clonlara

6 September 2020 B Semi-Final	Clarecastle	1-24 - 3-26 (AET)	Newmarket-on-Fergus	O'Garney Park, Sixmilebridge

12 September 2020 B Semi-Final	Clonlara	3-18 - 3-11	Crusheen	Shannon

19 September 2020 B Final	Clonlara	0-23 - 1-16	Newmarket-on-Fergus	O'Garney Park, Sixmilebridge
