= Bunratty Lower =

Barony in County Clare, Ireland

Bunratty Lower Bun Raite Íochtarach
- Location within Ireland
- Coordinates: 52.740137°N 8.840416°W
- Country: Ireland
- Province: Munster
- County: Clare

Area
  - Total: 27,957 ha (69,080 acres)

Bunratty Lower (Irish: Bun Raite Íochtarach) is a barony in County Clare, Ireland. This ancient unit of land division is in turn divided into fourteen civil parishes.

== Legal context ==
Baronies were created after the Norman invasion of Ireland as divisions of counties and were used the administration of justice and the raising of revenue. While baronies continue to be officially defined units, they have been administratively obsolete since 1898. They are still used in land registration and specification for planning permissions. In many cases, a barony corresponds to an earlier Gaelic túath which had submitted to the Crown.

== Landscape ==
Bunratty Lower is a division of the former barony of Bunratty. This belonged to the Macnamara family, and was called Dangan-i-vigin. It is bounded by the barony of Bunratty Upper (to the north) and by the barony of Tulla Lower (to the east). To the south, the River Shannon separates it from County Limerick. To the west, the River Fergus separates it from the baronies of Clonderalaw and Islands. The barony covers an area of 69,083 acres (27,957 ha), of which 11,623 acres (4,704 ha) are tideway. The land is rocky and supports many sheep.

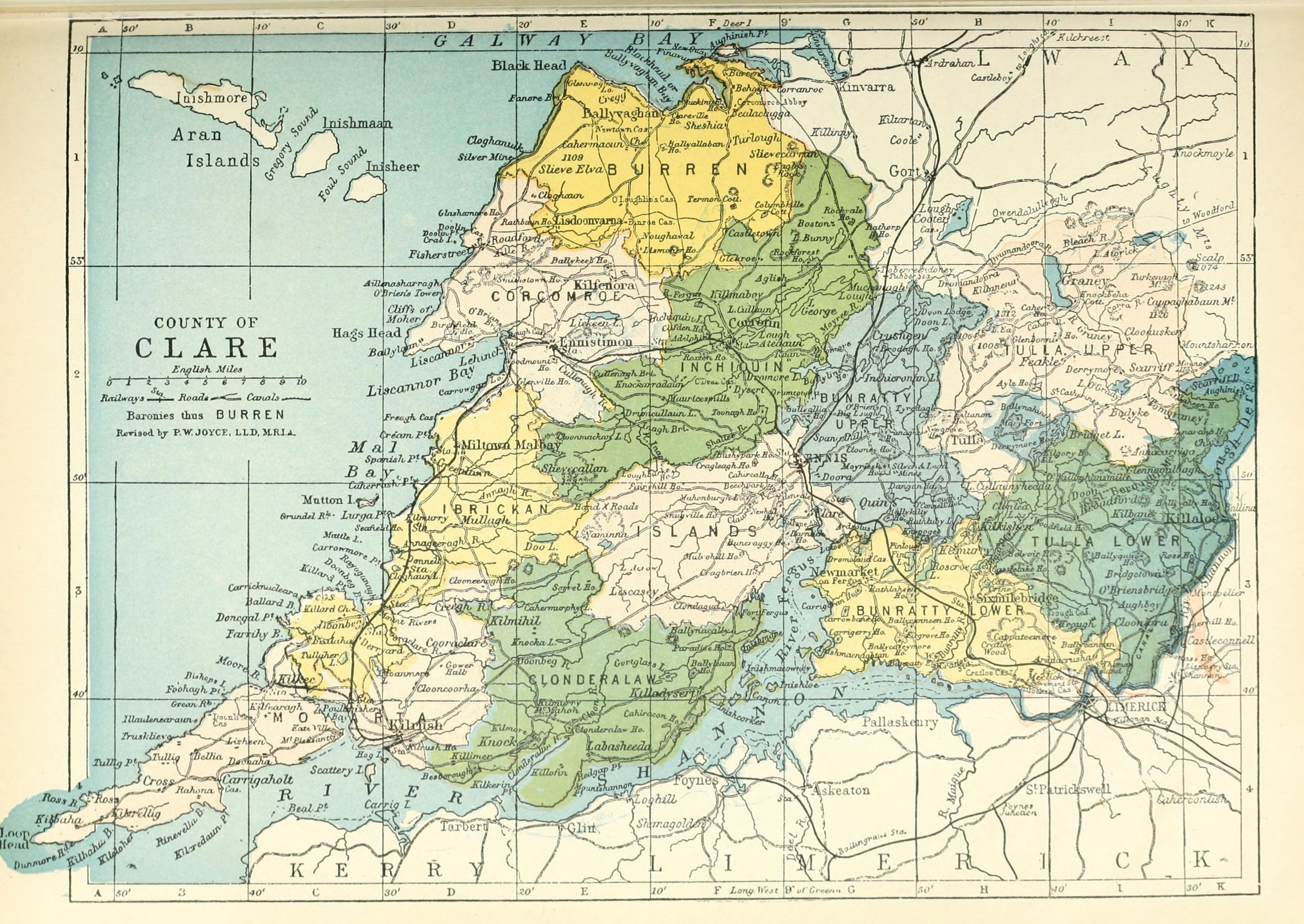
Baronies of Clare. Bunratty Lower is in the southeast.

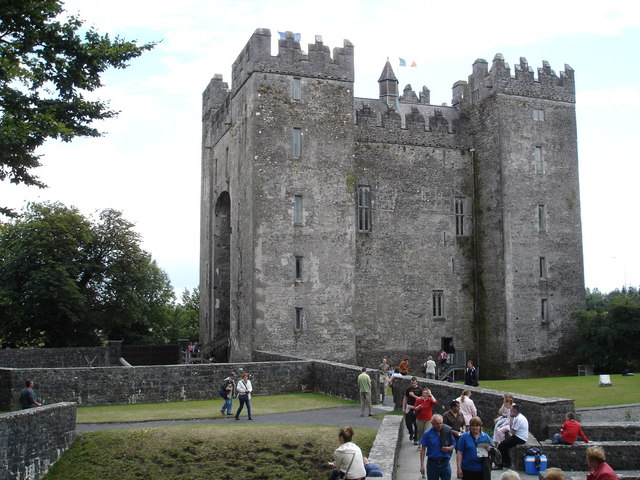
Bunratty Castle

== Parishes and settlements ==
Bunratty Lower contains the parishes of Bunratty, Clonloghan, Drumline, Feenagh, Kilconry, Kilfinaghta, Kilfintinan, Kilmaleery, Kilmurry, Kilnasoolagh and Tomfinlough, as well as part of the parishes of Killeely, St. Munchin's and St. Patrick’s. The main towns are Newmarket-on-Fergus and Sixmilebridge.

== Facilities and attractions ==
- Shannon Airport
- Bunratty Castle
