= Kilseily =

Civil parish in County Clare, Ireland

Kilseily Cill tSíle
- Civil parish
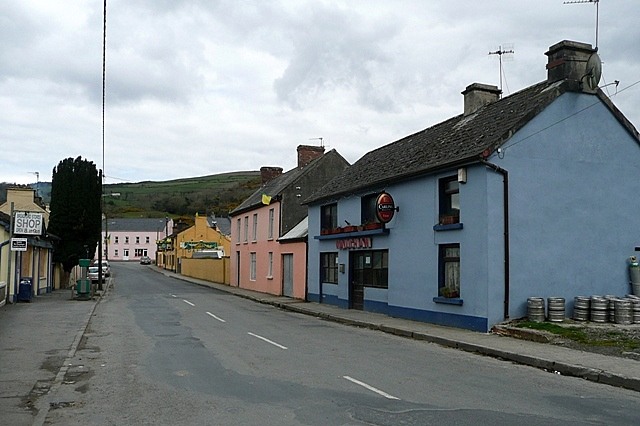
- Main Street, Broadford

- Location in Ireland
- Coordinates: 52.805849°N 8.632857°W
- Country: Ireland
- Province: Munster
- County: County Clare
- Time zone: UTC+0 (WET)
  - Summer (DST): UTC-1 (IST (WEST))

Kilseily (Irish: Cill tSíle) is a civil parish in County Clare, Ireland. The main settlement is the village of Broadford.

== Location ==
Kilseily lies in the barony of Tulla Lower, County Clare. It is 9 miles (14 km) to the southwest of Killaloe on the road to Ennis. As of 1837 it had 10,008 statute acres (4,050 ha) as applotted under the tithe act. Some of the land was suitable for cultivation while the rest was mountain pasture or bog. The parish had slate quarries. Lough Doon is on the northwest boundary. The parish contains the town of Broadford. It is 3 by 5 miles (4.8 by 8.0 km), covering a total of 11,102 acres (4,493 ha). In 1841 it had 4,153 people in 662 houses.

== History ==
Clonlea, Kilseily and part of O'Brien's Bridge (Trúgh) used to comprise the district of Ui Floinn, the land of the O'Flynns. This sept is little known, but there is a mention in MacGrath's Wars of Thormond of the battle of Magh Duine around 953 in which Lachtna, uncle of Brian Boroimhe, slew three of the O'Flynns. Part of Killokennedy was amalgamated with Kilseily to form what is now the parish of Broadford in the Roman Catholic Diocese of Killaloe.

== Townlands ==
Townlands are Ahaclare, Ardskeagh, Ballykelly, Cloonsheerea, Cloontra, Cloontra East, Cloontra West, Coolagh, Crag, Derryvinnaan, Derry, Doon, Drummin, Drumminakela, Drumsillagh or Sallybank (Merritt), Drumsillagh or Sallybank (Parker), Gortacullin, Gortnaglogh, Gortnagonnella, Hurdleston, Killaderry (Massy), Killaderry (O'Brien), Kilmoculla, Kilseily, Knockshanvo, Kyle, Meanagh, Mountrice, O'Shea's Acres, Snaty (Cooper), Snaty (Massy), Snaty (Wilson), Violethill and Woodfield.

== Sources ==
- "Broadford". Diocese of Killaloe.
- "Cill tSíle". Placenames Database of Ireland.
- Frost, James (1893). The History and Topography of the County of Clare: From the Earliest Times to the Beginning of the 18th Century. author. p. 151.
- Kilseily. 1845.
- Lewis, Samuel (1837). "Kilseily". County Clare: A History and Topography.
- "Map of Kilseily Parish showing Townlands". Clare County Library.
