= Clonlea =

Clonlea Cluain Lao
- Civil parish
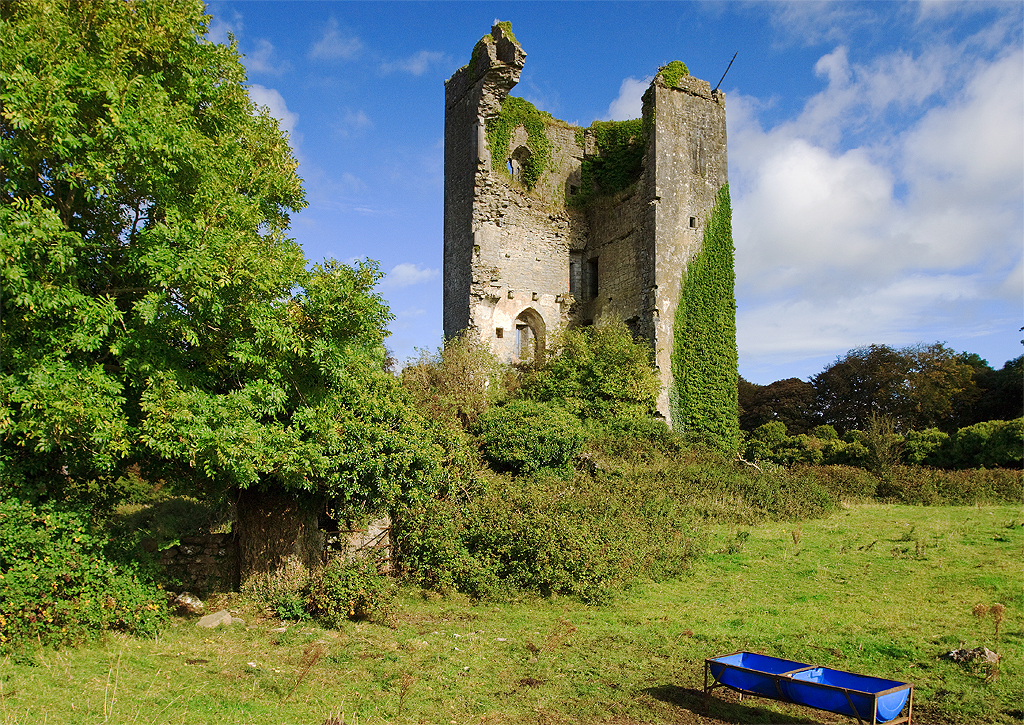
- Kilkishen Castle

- Location within Ireland
- Coordinates: 52.808°N 8.745°W
- Country: Ireland
- County: Clare

Clonlea or Clonleigh (Irish: Cluain Lao) is a civil parish in County Clare, Ireland. The main settlement is the village of Kilkishen. It is part of the Catholic parish of O'Callaghans Mills.

== Location ==
Clonlea is in the barony of Tullagh. It is 4.5 miles (7.2 km) to the north of Sixmilebridge. It contains the village of Kilkishen. The parish is 5.5 miles (8.9 km) long and up to 3.25 miles (5.23 km) wide, covering an area of 8,833 acres (3,575 ha), some of which is covered by lakes. These include Lough Culleaungheeda, Lough Doon, Lough Clonleigh, Clonbrick and Castle-lake. There is a holy well dedicated to Saint Senán of Iniscathy on the edge of Clonlea lake. The ruins of the old parish church, and the burial ground, are on the southwest shore of Clonlea lake. The old ruin of Stackpoole overlooks the lakes of Pollagh and Mount Cashel.

The parish covers 5,355 statute acres as applotted under the tithe act, mostly mountain and bog. The parish contains the townlands of Ballyvorgal (Beg), Ballyvorgal (North), Ballyvorgal (South), Belvoir, Belvoir Demesne, Cappalaheen, Clashduff, Cloghoolia, Clonbrick, Clonlea, Cloonloum Beg, Cloonloum More, Coolistoonan, Derrynaveagh, Enagh (East), Enagh (North), Enagh (West), Glenwood, Gortadroma, Gortnacorragh, Gortnaglearagh, Kilkishen Demesne, Killanena, Killeen, Knockatinty, Knockatloe, Knockatooreen, Lakyle, Mountallon, Oatfield and Teeronea.

== History ==
Clonlea, Kilseily and part of O'Brien's Bridge (Trúgh) used to comprise the district of Ui Floinn, the land of the O'Flynns. This sept is little known, but there is a mention in MacGrath's Wars of Thormond of the battle of Magh Duine around 953 in which Lachtna, uncle of Brian Boroimhe, slew three of the O'Flynns.

The old burial ground is said to contain the remains of one John Cusack, of Kilkishin Castle, who is said to have earned the hatred of the people by acting as a discoverer of the estates of the Catholic gentry.

The first church at Kilkishen was probably built very early in the 19th century. It is mentioned in an 1811 report of a dispute that led to violence over who should sit nearest to the altar.

As of 1831 the parish had 3,105 inhabitants. In 1841 there were 3,749 in 579 houses. In 1834 there were 3,274 Catholics and 60 Protestants. There were 60 limekilns, used to make lime to fertilize the soil. The parish was part of the Catholic union of Kilkishen, which also included the parish of Killuran. Each year two fairs were held at Enagh, and three at Kilkishen. Major renovation or reconstruction of the church was completed in 1865. The fair called Enagh O'Floinn was still being held late in the 19th century, although the sept of the O'Flynns had died out more than five hundred years earlier.

Today the civil parish is part of the Catholic parish of O'Callaghans Mills, which also includes the old parish of Killuran. It is served by the church of St Senan's in Kilkishen.

In 2017, a previously unrecorded mass rock and altar stone were discovered by a local teenager on the south west shore of the lake.
