= Montpelier, County Limerick =

Village in County Limerick, Ireland

Coordinates: 52°45′N 8°30′W

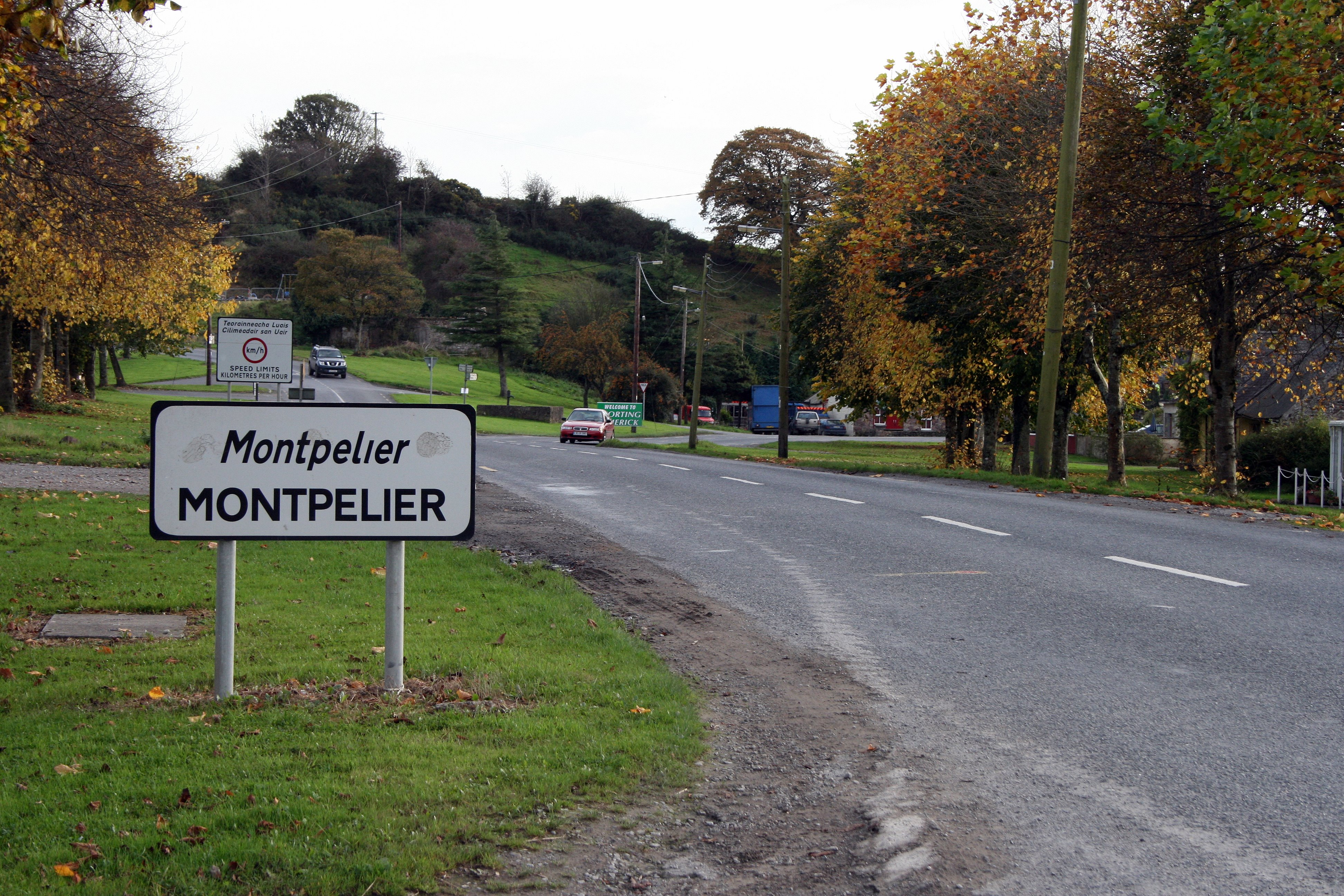
Montpelier, County Limerick

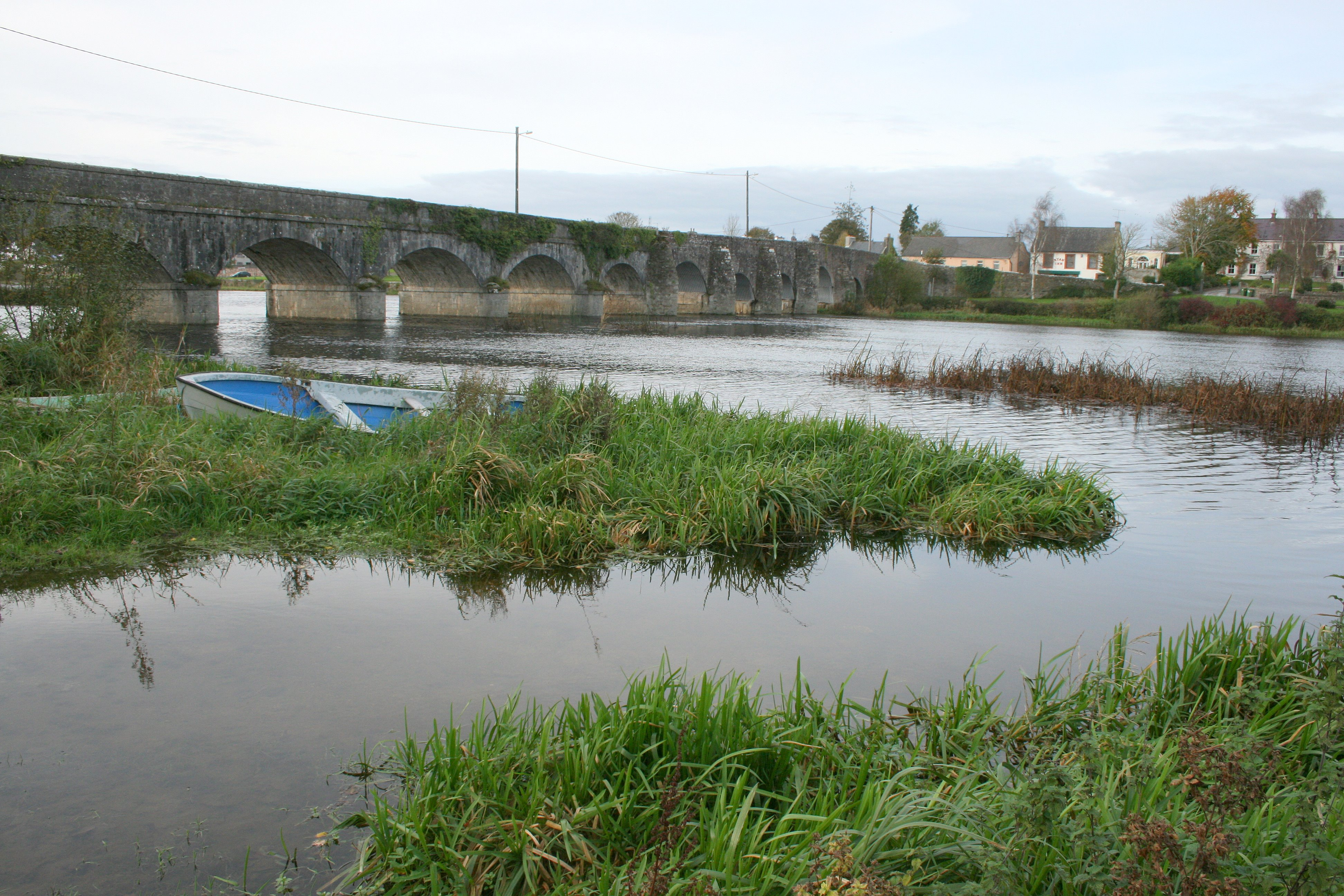
O'Briensbridge over the Shannon from Montpelier

Montpelier (Irish: Montpelier) is a village and a townland in east County Limerick, Ireland, on the east bank of the River Shannon. It is connected to O'Briensbridge across the river in County Clare by a 14-arch stone bridge. The first bridge across the river here was built in 1506 by Turlough O'Brien, First Earl of Thomond and his brother, the Bishop of Killaloe.

This 16th-century bridge was in turn replaced or rebuilt c. 1750. The five arches on the west side of the bridge date from this period. The six arches on the east side were replaced by the Shannon Commissioners in 1842. The first arch on the west side was replaced by the present navigation arch when the Shannon Scheme was built downstream in 1925–29. The bridge carries the R466 roadway.

The ancient river-crossing here is believed to be identical with Áth Caille (meaning "Ford of the Wood"): one of the three fords mentioned in the Triads of Ireland, the others being Áth Clíath (Dublin) and Áth Lúain (Athlone).

== See also ==
- List of towns and villages in Ireland
- O'Briensbridge-Montpelier
