= Killokennedy =

Killokennedy Cill Ó gCinnéide
- Civil parish
- Location in Ireland
- Coordinates: 52.830773°N 8.594452°W
- Country: Ireland
- Province: Munster
- County: County Clare
- Time zone: UTC+0 (WET)
  - Summer (DST): UTC-1 (IST (WEST))

Killokennedy (Irish: Cill Ó gCinnéide) is a civil parish in County Clare, Ireland.

== Location ==
Killokennedy lies in the barony of Tulla Lower, County Clare, about 5 miles (8.0 km) west of Killaloe. It is on the road from Killaloe to Ennis. In 1837, as applotted under the tithe act, it contained 9,349 statute acres (3,783 ha). Much of this is mountain pasture, and there is some bog. The Cragnamurragh and Glennagalliagh mountains rise to 1,729 feet (527 m) and 1,458 feet (444 m) in altitude. The parish is about 7.5 by 2.75 miles (12.07 by 4.43 km) covering 11,656 acres (4,717 ha) in total.

== History ==
As of 1841 there were 3811 inhabitants in 596 houses. The Catholic chapel of Killokennedy was united to the chapel of Kiltenanlea. Part of Killokennedy was amalgamated with Kilseily to form what is now the parish of Broadford in the Diocese of Killaloe.

== Townlands ==
Townlands are Aharinaghbeg, Ballymoloney, Ballyquin Beg, Ballyquin More, Barbane, Cappanaslish, Cloongaheen East, Cloongaheen West, Cloonyconry Beg, Cloonyconry More, Coolderry, Crean, Formoyle Beg, Formoyle More, Kilbane, Killeagy (Goonan), Killeagy (Ryan), Killeagy (Stritch), Killokennedy, Kilmore, Kyleglass, Leitrim, Muingboy, Shannaknock, Springmount, Tooreen and Woodpark.
