= O'Briensbridge-Montpelier =

Urban area in counties Clare and Limerick, Ireland

O'Briensbridge–Montpelier Droichead Uí Bhriain - Montpelier
- Urban area
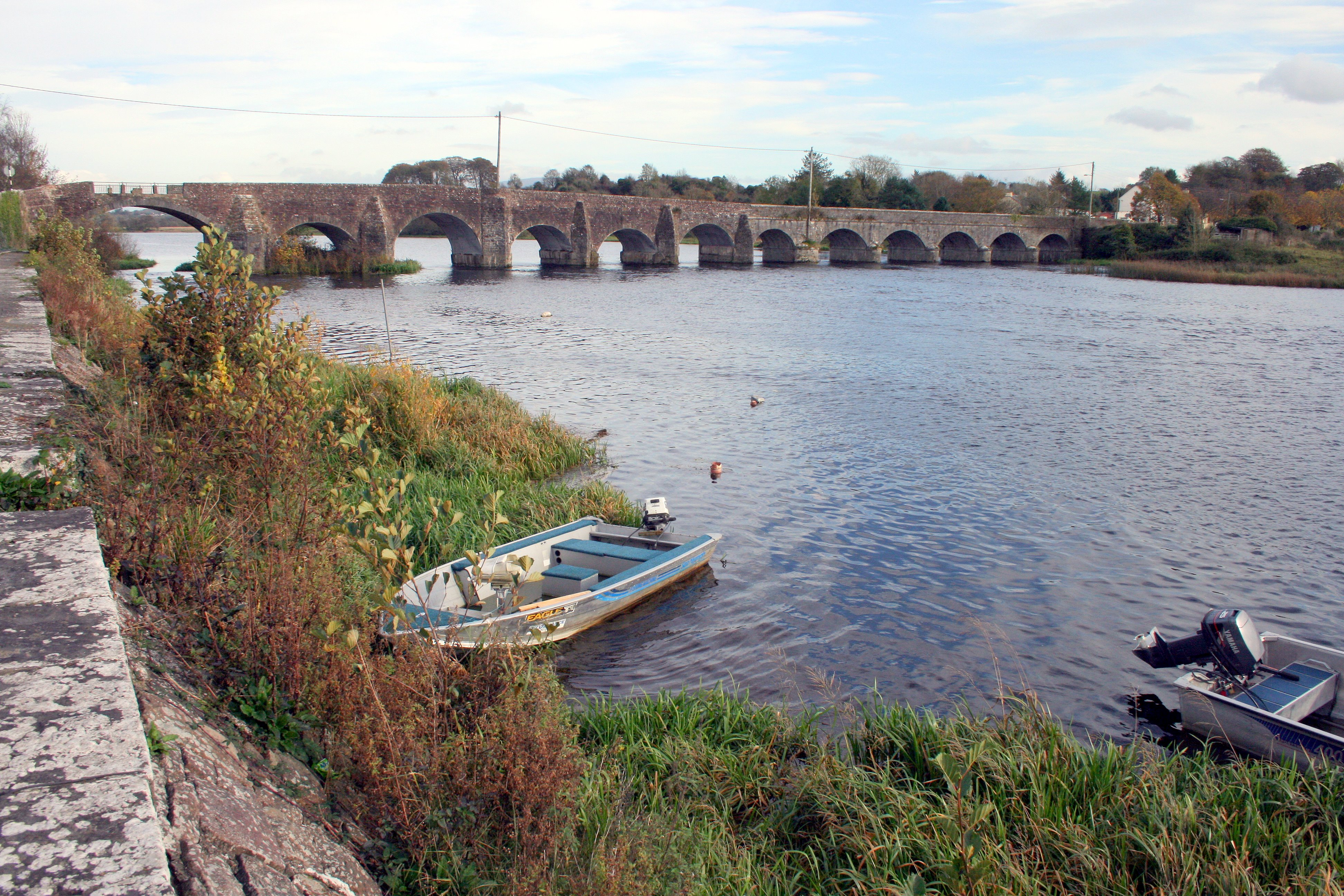
- O'Briensbridge, County Clare

- Location in Ireland
- Coordinates: 52°45′N 8°30′W
- Country: Ireland
- Province: Munster

Population (2022)
  - Total: 451
- Time zone: UTC+0 (WET)
  - Summer (DST): UTC-1 (IST (WEST))
- Irish Grid Reference: R656667

O'Briensbridge–Montpelier is an urban area in Ireland, comprising the villages of O'Briensbridge in County Clare and Montpelier in County Limerick which face each other across the River Shannon. The combined census town had a population of 451 at the 2022 census.

== Bridge ==
O'Briens Bridge (Irish: Droichead Uí Bhriain, meaning 'The bridge of O'Brien') is a 12-arch bridge which connects the village of O'Briensbridge in east County Clare, on the west bank of the River Shannon, with Montpelier in County Limerick on the eastern bank.

The first bridge across the river here was built in 1506 by Turlough O'Brien, First Earl of Thomond and his brother, the Bishop of Killaloe.

This 16th-century bridge was in turn replaced or rebuilt c. 1750. The five arches on the west side of the bridge date from this period. The six arches on the east side were replaced by the Shannon Commissioners in 1842. The first arch on the west side was replaced by the present navigation arch when the Shannon Scheme was built downstream in 1925–29.

The ancient river-crossing here is believed to be identical with Áth Caille (meaning "Ford of the Wood"): one of the three fords mentioned in the Triads of Ireland, the others being Áth Clíath (Dublin) and Áth Lúain (Athlone).
