= Killuran =

Civil parish in County Clare, Ireland

Killuran Cill Úráin
- Civil parish
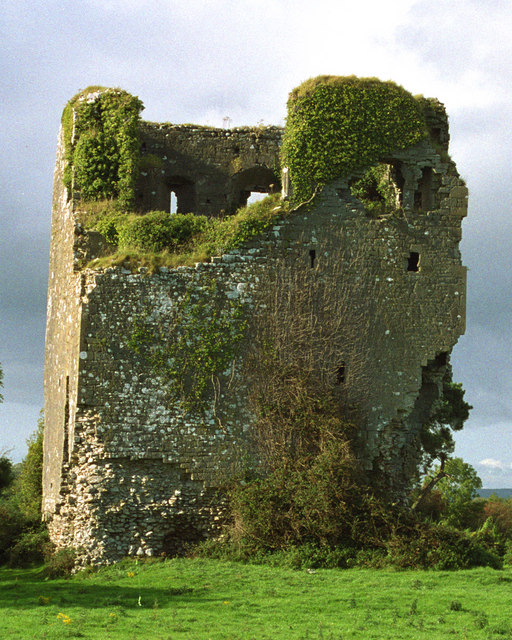
- Terrovannan Tower House

- Location within Ireland
- Coordinates: 52°50′31″N 8°41′08″W
- Country: Ireland
- Province: Munster
- County: County Clare
- Time zone: UTC+0 (WET)
  - Summer (DST): UTC-1 (IST (WEST))

Killuran (Irish: Cill Úráin) is a civil parish in County Clare, Ireland. It contains the village of O'Callaghans Mills. It is united with the civil parish of Kilkishen in the Catholic parish of O'Callaghans Mills.

== Location ==
The parish is in the barony of Tulla Lower, and is 2.5 miles (4.0 km) north of Broadford, County Clare. It is 3.75 by 3.5 miles (6.04 by 5.63 km) and covers 7,103 acres (2,874 ha). The parish is hilly. Lough Doon lies on the southwest boundary. The rivulet of Ougarnee forms the west border. There is some mountain pasture and bog but most of the land is suitable for farming.

The parish contains the village of O'Callaghans Mills. The road from Killaloe to Ennis crosses the southwest of the parish, running through O'Callaghans Mills. In 1841 the population was 3,058 in 480 houses. Of these, 2,727 lived in the rural districts in 422 houses. As of 1845 the parish was united to Kilkishen.

== Antiquities ==
In MacNamara’s Rental the name of the parish is given as Cill Lobhrain, meaning the church of Saint Uran. There are no records of this saint. The old church is almost completely destroyed apart a fragment of the south wall. It is surrounded by a large graveyard.

In 1837 there were ruins of ancient castles at Monegona, Tierovane and on the shore of the lake of Doon. The owner of Moanogeenagh in 1580 was Sioda MacRory MacNamara. The castle had been almost completely destroyed by 1897. The owner of Teerovannan in 1580 was Donald Reagh MacNamara. In 1897 this castle was almost at its original height, but the facing of its doors and windows was gone.

== Townlands ==
Townlands are Ballymacdonnell, Ballynabrone, Cappalea, Claremount, Clooncool, Coolnahella, Doon, Doorus, Drimmeen, Drimmeennagun, Drummin, Elmhill, Foxandgeese, Gortatrassa, Iragh, Keelderry, Killavoy, Killuran, Killuran Beg, Killuran More, Loughborough, Moanogeenagh, Newtown, Rosneillan, Silvergrove, Teerovannan, Tooreen and Violethill.
