= Kilfintinan =

Civil parish in County Clare, Ireland

Kilfintinan Cill Fhiontanáin
- Civil Parish
- Location within Ireland
- Coordinates: 52°41′55″N 8°45′47″W
- Country: Ireland
- Province: Munster
- County: County Clare
- Time zone: UTC+0 (WET)
  - Summer (DST): UTC-1 (IST (WEST))

Kilfintinan (Irish: Cill Fhiontanáin) is a civil parish in County Clare, Ireland. It is part of the Catholic parish of Cratloe.

== Name ==
The name Cill Fintinan would mean "Church of Fintinan", but there is no known Irish Saint Fintinan. The name is therefore thought to come from Cill Fionn tSeanain, or "Church of the fair Senan".

== Location ==
The parish is in the barony of Bunratty Lower, and contains a small part of the town of Sixmilebridge. It contains the village of Cratloe. It extends south from this town to the River Shannon. The parish includes two small islands of Grass and Graigue in the Shannon. The road from Limerick to Ennis crosses the south of the parish. It is 3 by 1.75 miles (4.83 by 2.82 km) and covers 6,115 acres (2,475 ha).

== Antiquities and history ==
The old church of Kilfintinan in the townland of Ballybrohan was almost entirely demolished by 1897. The church of Cruachán in the townland of Brickhill was in reasonably good condition. It was large, and surrounded by a large graveyard. There was another graveyard called Cill-an-bothair in the Ballyliddane townland, but no trace of a church.

An old cromlech in very good condition stood near the Cruachán ruins. There was another nearby, but it had been demolished. On the hill called the Leacht, near the cromlechs, there was the grave of an unknown Irish chieftain from pre-Christian times. As of 1837 the ruins of the castles of Cratloe, Cratloe Kail, and Ballintlea were still visible. The Ballintea castle is not found in the 1580 list of castles.

In the mid-18th century there was a shortage of Catholic priests in the region. The parish of Kilfintinan was therefore merged with part of the parish of Killeely, forming what is now known as the parish of Cratloe after the village of that name. The population in 1841 was 2,633 in 424 houses. At that time there were two Catholic chapels.

== Townlands ==
The parish holds the townlands of Ballinphunta, Ballintlea North, Ballintlea South, Ballybroughan, Ballyliddan East, Ballyliddan West, Ballymorris, Ballyroe, Brickhill East, Brickhill West, Calluragh, Cappanalaght, Carrowmore, Carrownerribul, Castlequarter, Cratloe, Fortwilliam, Gallowshill, Garryncurra, Gortnanool, Heathmount, Island, Knockroe, Laghile, Mountievers, Moyhill and Portdrine.
