= Henry Gillespie (priest) =

Henry John Gillespie, D.D. was an Anglican priest in Ireland in the 20th-century.

Gillespie was educated at Trinity College, Dublin and ordained in 1876. After a curacy in Roscrea he held incumbencies at Dunkerrin, Castletownarra, Finnoe and Kiltenanlea. He was Dean of Killaloe from 1917 until 1936.
