= Broadford, County Clare =

Village in County Clare, Ireland

Broadford Áth Leathan
- Village
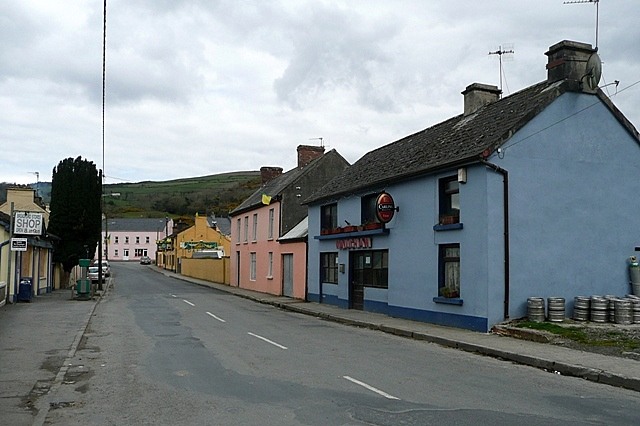
- Main Street

- Location in Ireland
- Coordinates: 52°48′22.6″N 8°37′56.51″W
- Country: Ireland
- Province: Munster
- County: County Clare

Population (2022)
  - Total: 294

Broadford (Irish: Áth Leathan) is a small village in eastern County Clare, Ireland and a Catholic parish of the same name. As of the 2022 census, the village population was 294.

The R466 road passes through the village of Broadford between O'Callaghan's Mills and O'Briens Bridge. Broadford is in the Glenomra Valley on the southern slopes of the Slieve Bearnagh Mountains near Doon Lough.

The Catholic parish of Broadford is in the Diocese of Killaloe. It originated in the medieval parishes of Kilseily and Killokennedy. Part of Killokennedy was amalgamated with Kilseily to form what is now the parish of Broadford. The parish today has three church buildings, which as of 2014 served about 800 parishioners.

Local Link bus route 318 operates to and from Ennis and Limerick as at 2025.

== See also ==
- List of towns and villages in Ireland
