= Kiltenanlea =

Civil parish in County Clare, Ireland

Kiltenanlea Cill tSeanáin Léith
- Civil parish
- Location in Ireland
- Coordinates: 52.723843°N 8.55282°W
- Country: Ireland
- Province: Munster
- County: County Clare
- Time zone: UTC+0 (WET)
  - Summer (DST): UTC-1 (IST (WEST))

Kiltenanlea or Kiltonanlea (Irish: Cill tSeanáin Léith) is a civil parish in County Clare, Ireland.

== Name ==
The name in Irish is Cill-t'Seanain Liath, meaning 'of Saint Senán, the hoary'. Saint Senán is considered to be the brother of Saint Mochuille in local tradition, and is thought to be different from Saint Senán of Iniscathy. However Saint Senán's festival is held on 8 March in Kiltenanlea, the same day that the festival of Saint Senán of Iniscathy is celebrated according to the Martyrology of Donegal.

== Location ==
The parish is in the barony of Tulla Lower, 7 miles (11 km) SSW of Killaloe on the road to Limerick. It is bounded to the east by the River Shannon. As of 1837 it held 6,595 statute acres, as applotted under the tithe act, most of which was cultivated, but including some bog. The parish contains the village of Cloonlara. It extends about 5 by 3 miles (8.0 by 4.8 km), and covers 7,627 acres (3,087 ha). As of 1841 the parish had a population of 4,016 in 629 houses. The Roman Catholic chapels of Kiltonanlea and Killokennedy were united in one parish.

A canal about 4 miles (6.4 km) long ran through the parish in the 19th century so that steam boats could avoid the Falls of Doonass. This cataract on the Shannon is dramatic. The river is 300 yards (270 m) wide and 40 feet (12 m) deep above the falls. It pours over large masses of rock, forming a succession of falls over a stretch of about .25 miles (0.40 km).

== Ruins ==
About 200 yd (180 m) from Kiltenanlea church is a holy well dedicated to St. Senán Liath. The townland of Gurrane has the ruins of an ancient church named Tampul Mochuille. Cappavilla has a holy well dedicated to Saint Mochuille, thought to be the saint who gave the veil to Saint Brigit of Kildare. The parish holds the ruined castles of Rhinnuagh, Newtown, and Coolistigue and several ancient raths or forts. Donass castle in the townland of Rineroe belonged to Shane-ne-geytagh MacNamara in 1580. In that year the castle of Coolisteige was the property of Donald Roe MacNamara, and the castle of Neadanury (now Newtown) belonged to Teige Oge MacNamara.

== Townlands ==
The parish contains the townlands of Aughboy, Bartleystown, Cappavilla North, Cappavilla South, Cloonlara, Clooncarhy, Coollisteige, Cottage, Derryfadda, Doonass, Doonass Demesne, DromintobinNorth, DromintobinSouth, Drummeen, Errina, Garraun, Gilloge, Illaunyregan, Kildoorus, Knockbrack Lower, Knockbrack Upper, Lisduff, Monaskeha, Mountcatherine, Newtown, Oakfield, Rineroe, Ruanard, Srawickeen, Springfield and Summerhill.
