= St. Munchin's Parish =

Civil parish in Ireland

St. Munchin's Parish Paróiste Mhainchín
- Civil parish
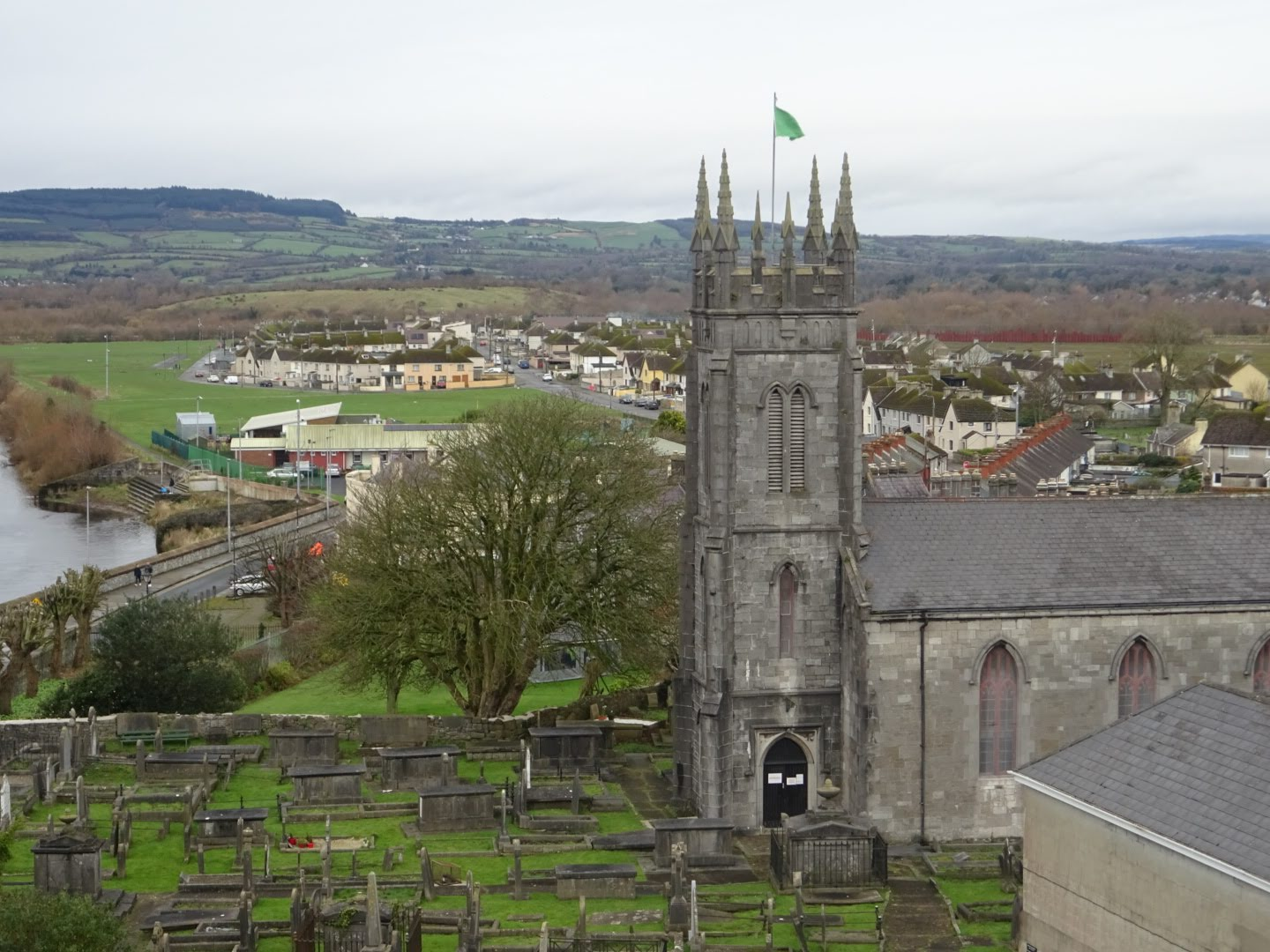
- Former St Munchin's Church of Ireland, built on the site of the medieval parish church

- Location in Ireland
- Coordinates: 52.703981°N 8.647792°W
- Country: Ireland
- Province: Munster
- County: County Clare
- Time zone: UTC+0 (WET)
  - Summer (DST): UTC-1 (IST (WEST))

St. Munchin's Parish (Irish: Paróiste Mhainchín) is an Irish civil parish that lies partly in County Clare and partly in County Limerick, including the city centre of Limerick. It takes its name from Saint Munchin, the first Bishop of Limerick. According to tradition its church was the first cathedral of the diocese of Limerick, built in 561 AD.

== Location ==
The parish lies partly in County Limerick and partly in County Clare. The parish is 3 by 2.5 miles (4.8 by 4.0 km) and covers 246 acres (100 ha) in the Liberties of Limerick, 1,511 acres (611 ha) in County Limerick and 2,827 acres (1,144 ha) in County Clare. The parish is divided into two parts by the intervening parishes of St. Nicholas and Killeely. The part of the city on King's Island is mostly in the parish.

== Antiquities ==
The old church of St. Munchin's is said to have been built in 561, and to have once been the cathedral of the diocese of Limerick. Saint Munchin, the first Bishop of Limerick, is supposed to have been buried in the churchyard. According to tradition the church was burned by the Danes. In 1827 a new Anglican church was built, designed by James Pain. This was deconsecrated in 1970 and was used until recently as an exhibition space.

There is an ancient stone near the north end of Thomond bridge called the treaty stone, since this is said to have been where the Treaty of Limerick was signed in 1691.

King's island has the remains of an old Dominican friary. A nunnery was established nearby, and in 1837 the nuns taught girls at no charge in an attached school. The Church of Ireland built a church in 1827 near the site of the old church with a square tower surmounted by pinnacles. A layer of ashes was found under the foundation of the old church, which may confirm the story of the earlier burning. As of 1841 the total population was 4,593 in 537 houses.

== Townlands ==
The parish contains twenty-two townlands. Nine are in the Barony of Bunratty Lower, County Clare, eleven in the North Liberties of the City of Limerick and the remaining two in the Barony of Clanwilliam, County Limerick.
