= Clonlara =

Village in County Clare, Ireland

Clonlara Cluain Lára
- Village
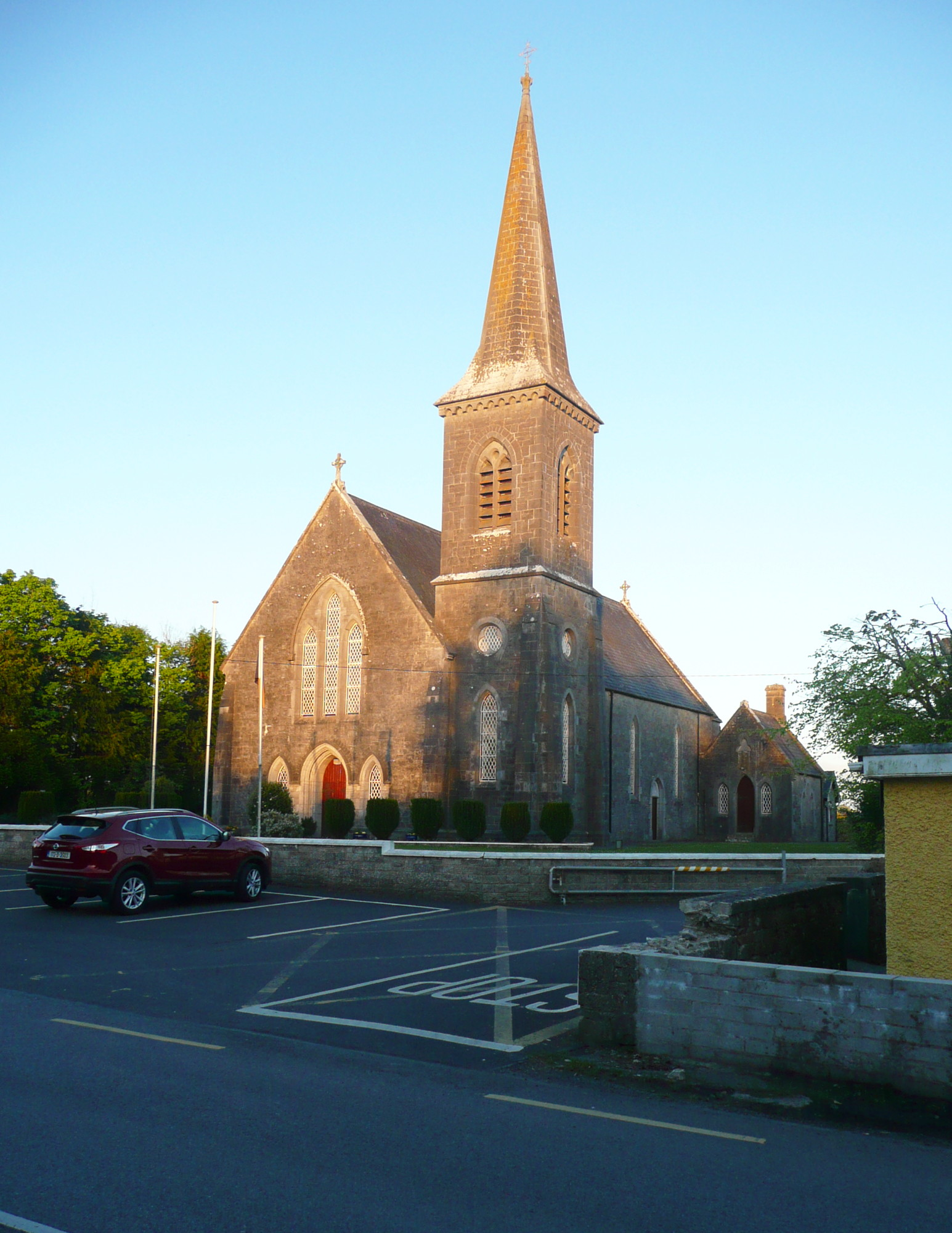
- Roman Catholic church at Clonlara

- Location in Ireland
- Coordinates: 52°43′N 8°33′W
- Country: Ireland
- Province: Munster
- County: County Clare

Population (2022)
  - Total: 724
- Time zone: UTC+0 (WET)
  - Summer (DST): UTC-1 (IST (WEST))
- Irish Grid Reference: R625638

Clonlara, officially Cloonlara (from Irish Cluain Lára), is a village in County Clare, Ireland. Clonlara is also a townland and a Catholic parish of the same name. As of the 2022 census, the village had a population of 724.

== Village and amenities ==
Clonlara is in the east of County Clare in the civil parish of Kiltonanlea or Doonass, barony of Tulla Lower. It lies between the River Shannon to the east and the Clare hills to the west and north. Clonlara village is on the road between Killaloe and Limerick, 8 km north-east of the centre of Limerick city. In 1841 there were 219 people in 31 houses. The village lies beside the head-race canal that deliver water to power the Ardnacrusha power plant a few kilometres to the southwest.

Clonlara has an equestrian centre and a Gaelic Athletic Association club, Clonlara GAA.

== Religion ==
The village is part of Clonlara parish of the Roman Catholic Diocese of Killaloe, and the Church of Ireland parish of Kiltenanlea. The parish has two churches: Mary, the Mother of God (Truagh) and St Senan's (Clonlara), both Roman Catholic. Kiltenanlea's Protestant church (Church of Ireland) is no longer a functioning parish church, but is used for weddings and seasonal carol services.

In 1956 in Clonlara, a group of people were reputedly prompted by a local Catholic curate to physically assault two Jehovah's Witnesses and to burn the literature which they had been trying to distribute. Several people were charged for involvement in the "Clonlara affair". While Taoiseach John A. Costello reportedly "responded to a protest from Bishop Joseph Rodgers of Killaloe" by writing that he "appreciated 'the just indignation aroused among the clergy and the people by the activities of the Jehovah’s Witnesses'", he also "insisted that the law had to be upheld".

== Notable people ==
- Colm Honan and Darach Honan, hurlers
- Marcus Horan, Irish rugby union player
- Jan O'Sullivan, Labour Party Teachta Dála (TD) and former Minister for Education

== See also ==
- List of towns and villages in Ireland
