= Clonlara (parish) =

Catholic parish in County Clare, Ireland

- Catholic parish
- Location within Ireland
- Coordinates: 52°43′N 8°33′W
- Country: Ireland
- Province: Munster
- County: County Clare
- Time zone: UTC+0 (WET)
  - Summer (DST): UTC-1 (IST (WEST))

Clonlara is a Catholic parish in County Clare in Ireland. Based on the village of Clonlara, it is part of the Scáth na Sionnaine grouping of parishes within the Roman Catholic Diocese of Killaloe. The parish is an amalgamation of the medieval parish Kiltenanlea (also known as Doonass) and parts of the parishes of Truagh and Kilseily.

== Churches ==
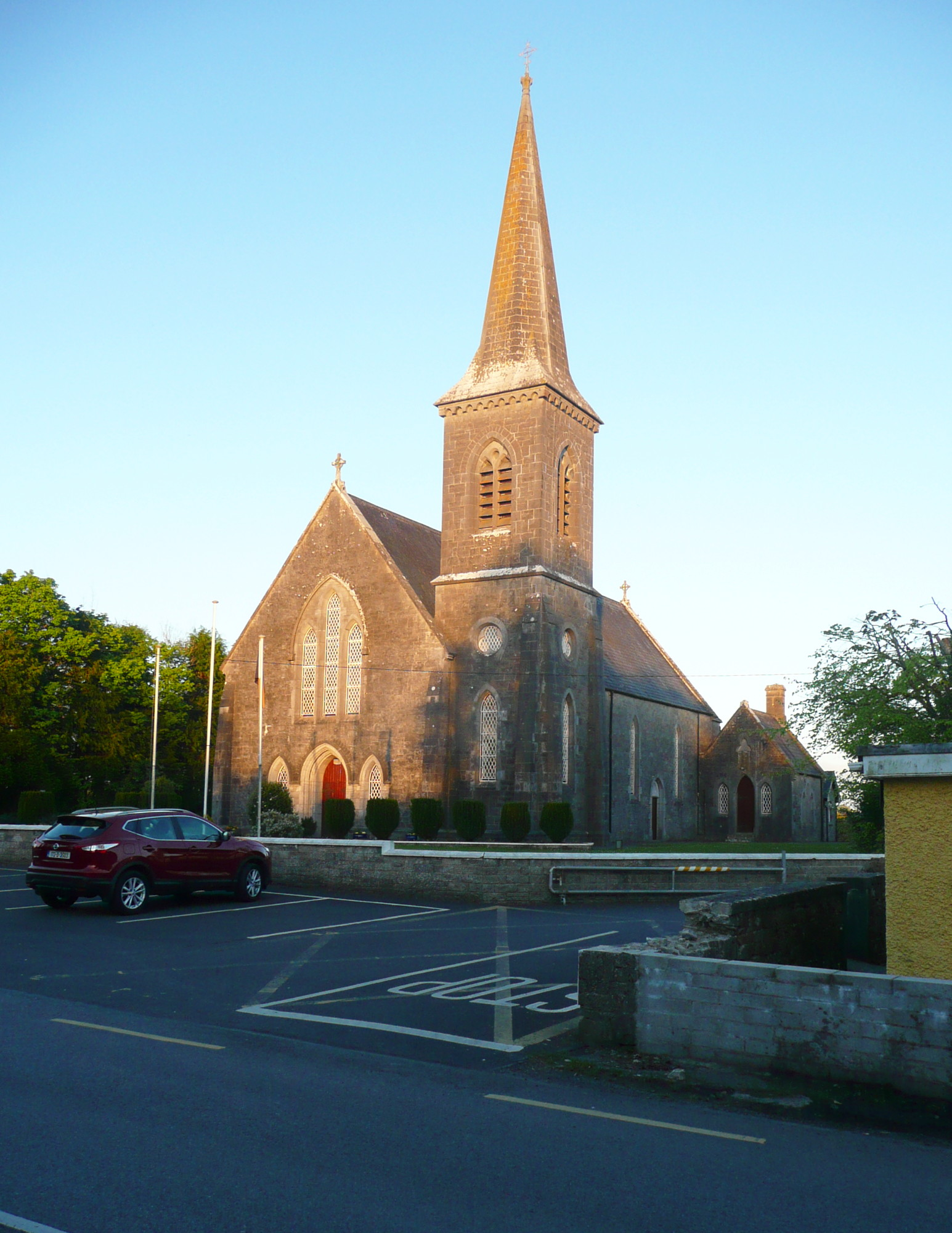
Church of St. Senan in Clonlara

There are two churches in the parish. The main church is the Church of St. Senan in Clonlara. This church was built in 1873 when a predecessor built in 1837 was considered too small for the congregation. The second church of the parish is the Mary the Mother of God Church in Truagh. This cruciform building was built in the 1840s is an early form of Gothic Revival architecture.
