= O'Callaghan's Mills =

Village in County Clare, Ireland

O'Callaghan's Mills Muillte Uí Cheallacháin
- Village
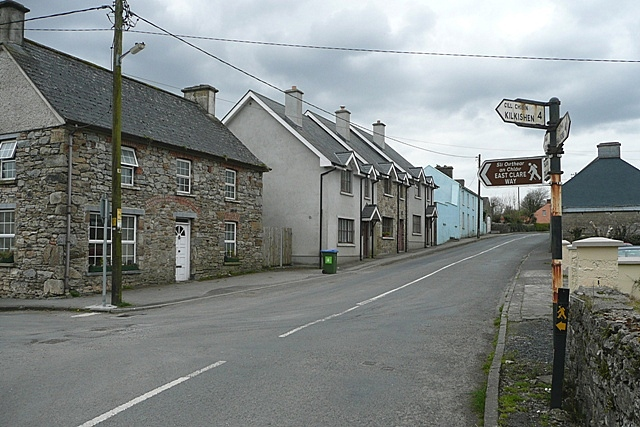
- Village sign for East Clare Way

- Location in Ireland
- Coordinates: 52°50′31″N 8°41′08″W
- Country: Ireland
- Province: Munster
- County: County Clare
- Elevation: 20 m (66 ft)
- Irish Grid Reference: R535769

O'Callaghan's Mills (Irish: Muillte Uí Cheallacháin), also O'Callaghansmills, is a village in County Clare, Ireland, and a Catholic parish by the same name. It takes its name from the O'Callaghan family, who were large landowners in the area, and a corn and grist mill built by John Coonan on the lands of Cornelius O'Callaghan in 1772.

== Geography ==
The parish of O'Callaghan's Mills, Kilkishen and Oatfield stretches from near Bodyke to near Sixmilebridge. It corresponds roughly to the old parishes of Killuran and Clonlea.

The parish churches are St Patrick's in O'Callaghan's Mills, St Senan's in Kilkishen and St. Vincent de Paul's in Oatfield.

The village of O'Callaghan's Mills is in east County Clare, about halfway between Ennis and Lough Derg. It is on the R466 road, about 26 kilometres (16 mi) north of Limerick City.

== History ==
The village of O'Callaghan's Mills takes its name from the O'Callaghan family who were large landowners in the area. They were displaced from the Mallow area of Cork in confiscations during the Cromwellian conquest of Ireland in the 1650s when they lost 24,000 acres (97 km^{2}), 20,000 of which was deemed to have been the property of the ruling chief, Donncha O'Callaghan. He and his extended family were transplanted to east Clare, where they obtained land in the barony of Tulla Lower. The village of O'Callaghan's Mills records their continued presence.

=== Parish history ===
There is a tradition that two priests of the Congregation of the Mission, or Vincentians, escaped from the 1651 siege of Limerick by Oliver Cromwell's troops, and for several years ministered to the people of the parish near the present church of St Vincent de Paul in Oatfield.

The foundation stone of the present church of St Patrick at O'Callaghan's Mills was laid in March 1839. It was dedicated in March 1840. Major renovations were undertaken in 1979-80. The first church in the old Clonlea part of the parish was probably built at Kilkishen very early in the 19th century. It is mentioned in an 1811 report of a dispute that led to violence over who should sit nearest to the altar. Major renovation or reconstruction was completed in 1865. The St Vincent de Paul church was built around 1830, replacing a thatched chapel. The roof was blown away in January 1839 on the Night of the Big Wind. The building was then enlarged with the addition of two transepts. In May 1966, Bishop Joseph Rodgers rededicated the church.

== Sport ==
O'Callaghan Mills GAA club has won the Clare county hurling championship on eight occasions. In 1909, the county final was contested by two teams from the village itself: The Fireballs and St Patrick's, with the Fireballs claiming victory. Since their last county title in 1937, the club has finished as runners-up on 7 occasions. The parish hurling team won the County Clare Senior B Championship in 2017. This was the first county title at senior level that the parish had won since 1937.

== Notable people ==
O'Callaghan's Mills was home to former athlete, politician and GAA administrator Tim Smythe (1905-1982). Smythe won a number of middle to long distance competitions, including 10 All-Ireland titles and a World cross-country title in March 1931. He is commemorated by a plaque at the entrance to the Doonaille housing estate beside St Patrick's National School.

== See also ==
- List of towns and villages in Ireland
