= Killeely =

Civil parish in counties Clare and Limerick, Ireland

Killeely Cill Liaile
- Civil parish
- Location in Ireland
- Coordinates: 52.699794°N 8.698904°W
- Country: Ireland
- Province: Munster
- County: County Clare
- Time zone: UTC+0 (WET)
  - Summer (DST): UTC-1 (IST (WEST))
- Irish Grid Reference: R330871

Killeely (Irish: Cill Liaile) is a civil parish that lies partly in County Clare and partly in County Limerick in Ireland.

== Location ==
Part of the parish lies within the north liberties of the city of Limerick, but most lies in the barony of Bunratty Lower of County Clare, 3 miles (4.8 km) from Limerick on the road to Ennis, and bordering the River Shannon. The parish reaches east almost to the old Thomond bridge of Limerick. It reaches northwest from the Shannon, rising to a height of 1,010 feet (310 m) in the north. It is 4.25 by 3 miles (6.84 km × 4.83 km), covering 5,013 acres (20.29 km^{2}) in the Bunratty section, 1,210 acres (4.9 km^{2}) in the Barony of Pubblebrien in county Limerick and 360 acres (1.5 km^{2}) in the city of Limerick.

== Antiquities ==
The patron saint of the parish is probably the virgin saint Faoile, of Atheliath Meadraidhe, in the county of Galway.

The part of the parish in the city of Limerick has a graveyard called Killeely churchyard, but there is no trace of a church. In the County Clare portion there is the graveyard of Moneen-na-gliggin (the little bog of the sculls), still in use in 1897, and the ruined church of Cratloe Moyle. This church seems to have served as an oratory to the adjoining castle of Cratloe Moyle. In 1580 this castle was owned by Shane MacNamara. The other castles on the Clare side were Cratloe Keel, property of Donald MacNamara in 1580 and still occupied in 1897, and Cratloe-more, which had been demolished for building materials. Near Cratloe Moyle is a holy well dedicated to John the Baptist.

The parish contains the hamlet of Meelick. In 1837 the parish was within the Catholic districts of Meelick and Thomond Gate, or St. Lelia. The total population in 1841 was 5,065 in 797 houses. Until the mid-19th century there was a ruin known as the Friary in the grounds of Cratloe House, but it was removed to improve the view.

== Townlands ==
The parish contains the townlands of Ballyvoughallan, Boolanacausk, Bullsfarm, Burtonhill, Cratloe, Cratloekeel, Cratloemoyle, Derry Beg, Derry More, Knocknaskeagh, Knockroe, Lakyle, Meelick, Moneennagliggin North or Boston, Moneennagliggin South, Pass, Punchbowl, Stonepark and Woodcockhill.
