= Thomond Bridge =

Bridge in Limerick, County Limerick, Ireland

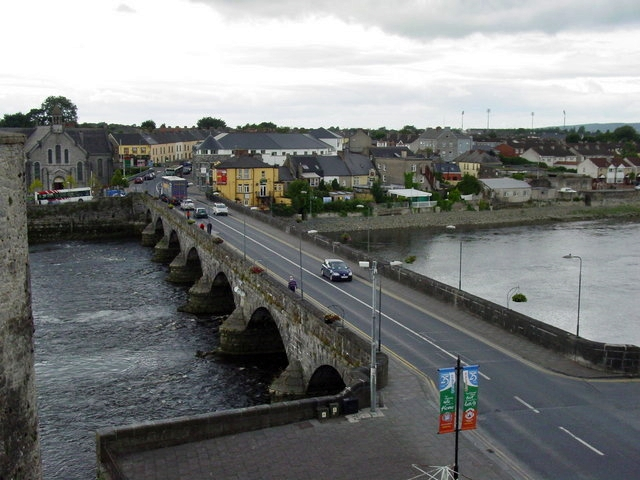
Thomond Bridge

Thomond Bridge is an historic bridge over the River Shannon, not far from its mouth in Limerick, County Limerick, Ireland.

== Historic bridge ==
The earliest construction of Thomond Bridge was built near a fording point. The old medieval Thomond Bridge, of fourteen arches, sat on the same site as the current bridge, near the 13th-century King John's Castle. The Treaty Stone was placed near to there, symbolising the end of the 1691 Siege of Limerick, during which the bridge was the site of a failed defence of Limerick City.

== Current bridge ==
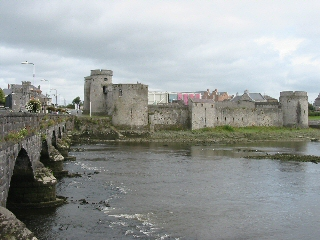
The current bridge over the River Shannon, with King John's Castle in the background.

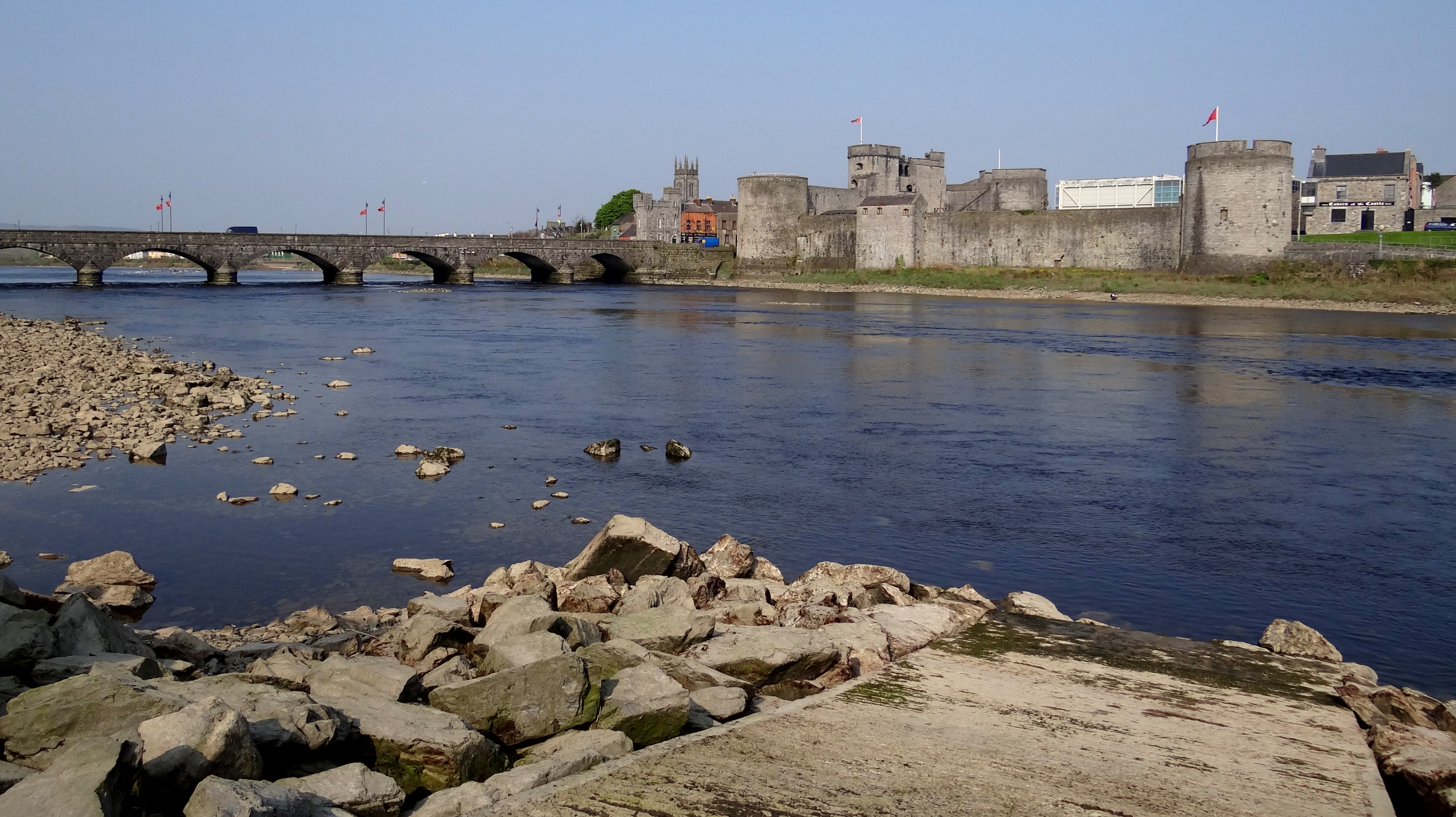
Thomond Bridge (at left), from the 19th century, stands on the site of the earlier bridge.

The current bridge, of seven arches, was built in 1836, replacing the earlier structure while incorporating its pier foundations. The bridge now forms part of the R445 (formerly the N7), carrying traffic on the Northern Relief Road.

== Sources ==
- Lewis, Samuel (1837). "Killely, or Killeely". County Clare: A History and Topography.
