= Killaloe, County Clare (civil parish) =

Killaloe Cill Dalua
- Civil parish
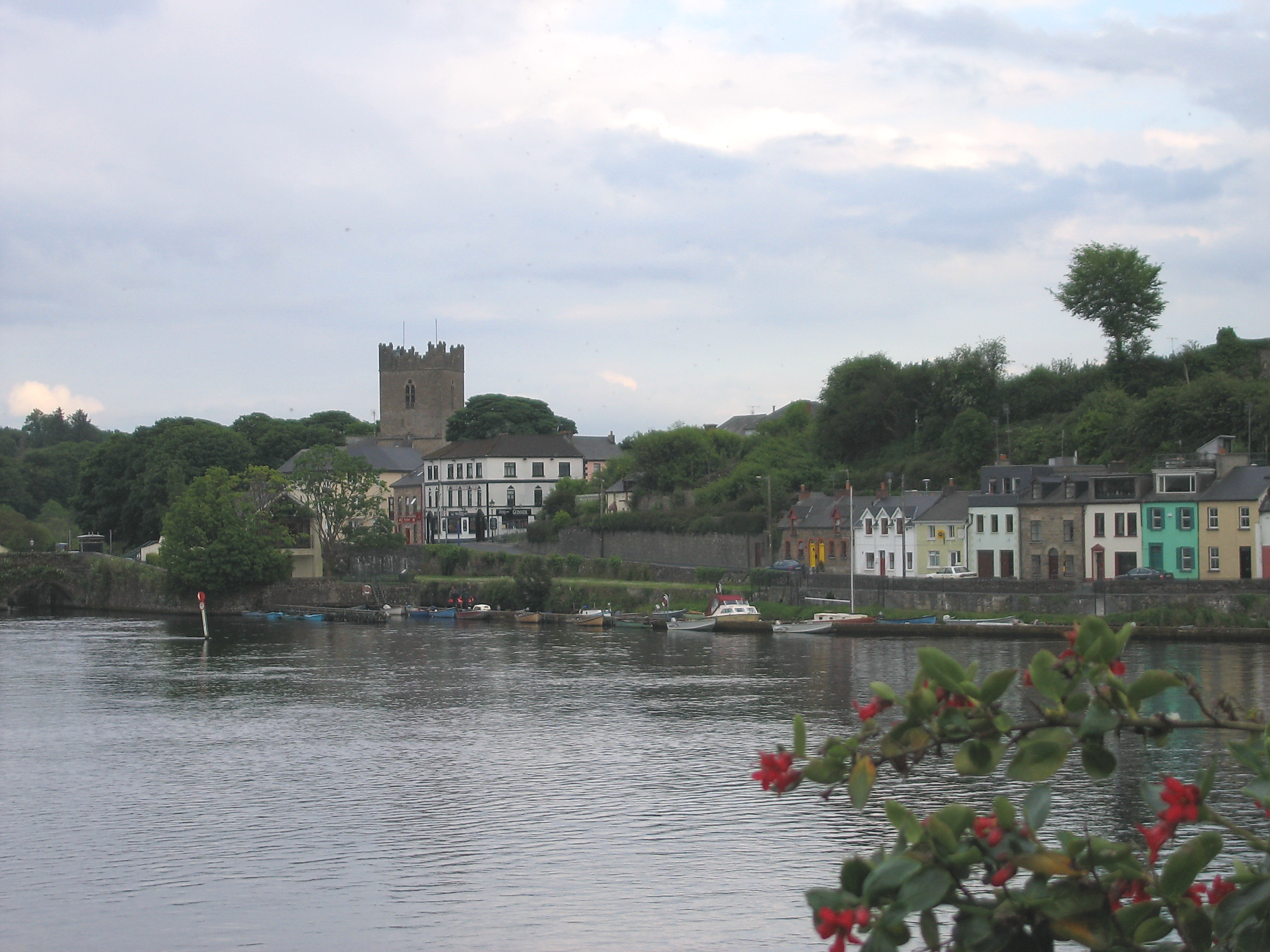
- The town of Killaloe

- Location within Ireland
- Coordinates: 52.807276°N 8.448586°W
- Country: Ireland
- County: Clare

Killaloe (/ˌkɪlæˈluː/; Irish: Cill Dalua) is a civil parish in County Clare, Ireland. The main settlement is the town of Killaloe.

== Location ==
The parish is in the barony of Tulla. It is 20 miles (32 km) from Ennis and 87 miles (140 km) from Dublin. The name is said to be a corrupt form of Kill-da-Lua, and to be derived from the foundation of an abbey by St. Lua or Molua in the 6th century. The town is on the west bank of the Shannon near the falls of Killaloe, about a mile from Lough Derg. In 1837 an old bridge with 19 arches crossed the river at this point. The parish in 1837 covered 13,045 statute acres, most of which were farmed.

== History ==
The town became head of a diocese founded about 639 by Pope John IV. The first bishop was Saint Flannan. Turlogh O’Brien built a bridge over the River Shannon at Killaloe in 1054. Hugh O’Connor destroyed the castle of Killaloe in 1061 and burned the town. It was burned again in 1080 and 1084. Moriertach, King of Ireland was buried in Killaloe in 1120 in a great ceremony. In 1177 the town was the scene of a ceremony in which Raymond Le Gros received the hostages of Roderic, King of Connaught, and O’Brien, Prince of Thomond, who took the oath of fealty to the King of England. The church became a pilgrim destination. Donald, King of Limerick, erected the cathedral in 1160. The town was destroyed in 1367 by Murrogh-na-Ranagh.

In 1831 there were 8,887 inhabitants of the parish, of whom 1,411 lived in the town.

== Townlands ==
Killaloe includes the townlands of Aillemore, Ardcloony, Ballycorney, Ballycuggaran, Ballygarreen, Ballykildea, Ballyvally, Carrowbaun, Carrownakilly, Classagh, Cloonfadda, Coumnagun, Craglea, Creeveroe, Feenlea, Garraunboy, Gortcallyroe, Gortmagy, Killestry, Knockyclovaun, Lackabranner, Lackenbaun, Moys and Shantraud.
