= O'Brien's Bridge =

Village in County Clare, Ireland

O'Briensbridge Irish: Droichead Uí Bhriain
- Village and parish
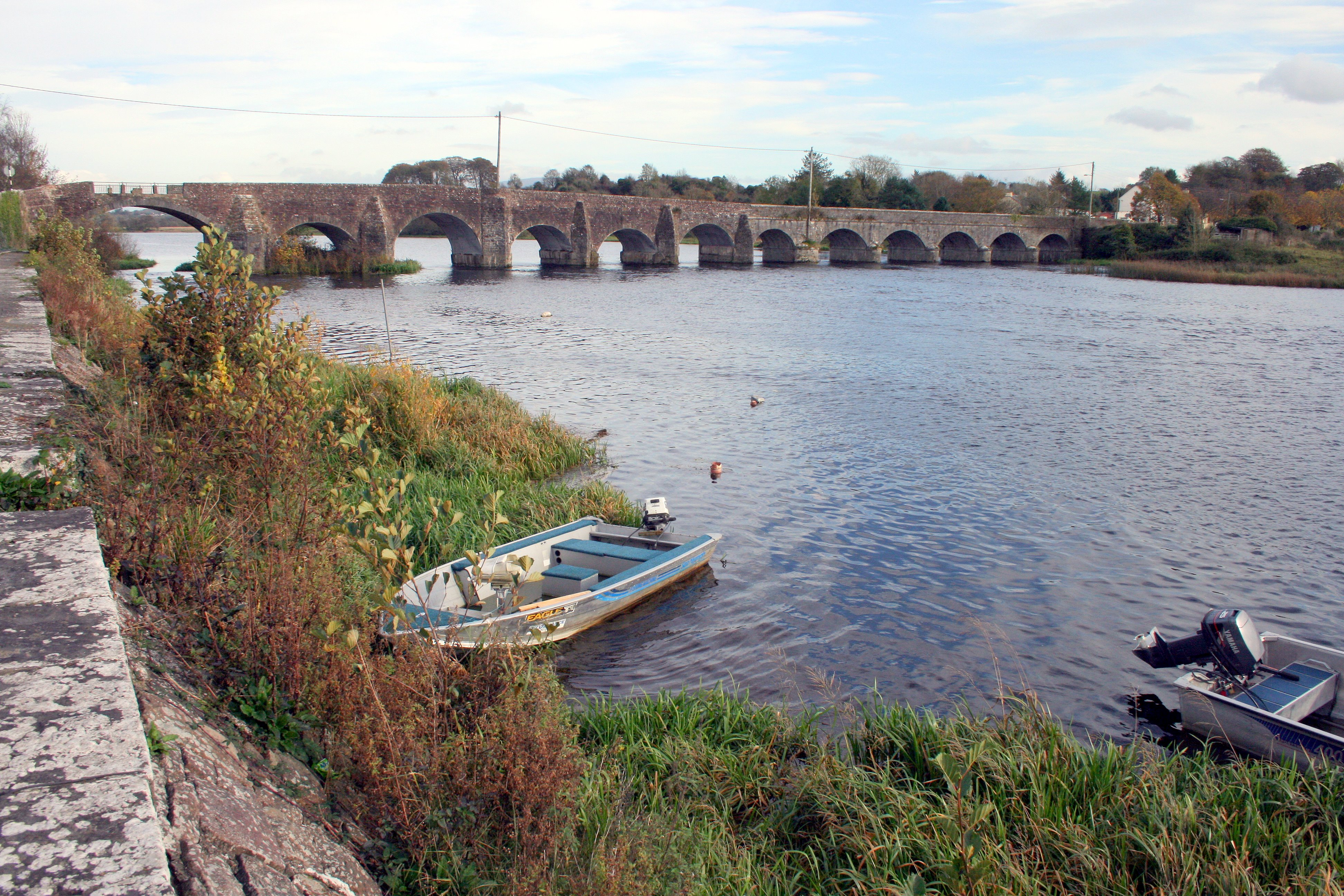
- O'Briensbridge over the Shannon

- Location in Ireland
- Coordinates: 52°45′10″N 8°29′57″W
- Country: Ireland
- Province: Munster
- County: County Clare
- Time zone: UTC+0 (WET)
  - Summer (DST): UTC-1 (IST (WEST))

O'Brien's Bridge or O'Briensbridge (Irish: Droichead Uí Bhriain) is a village in east County Clare, Ireland, on the west bank of the River Shannon, in a civil parish of the same name. It is named for the bridge across the Shannon at that point, built by Toirdhealbhach Donn Ó Briain in 1506.

== Location ==
The village is 13 km northeast of Limerick city. Facing it, on the other side of the river, at the eastern end of the bridge, is the County Limerick village of Montpelier. The two villages are treated as one urban area, O'Briensbridge-Montpelier, for census purposes.

== O'Briensbridge parish ==
The parish of O'Briensbridge, which includes the village of O'Brien's Bridge, is in the historical barony of Tulla Lower. (The village was formerly part of the parish of Killaloe.) It is 9.66 by 5.23 kilometres (6.00 by 3.25 mi) and covers 4,624 hectares (11,430 acres), including a detached district 4.8 by 3.2 kilometres (3.0 by 2.0 mi) to the southwest. The parish is bounded on the east by the River Shannon. The narrow northern section is mountainous, rising to 527 metres (1,729 ft), and the western part of the parish is also upland. There were two castles in the parish. The one at the village of O'Brien's Bridge was inhabited by Murtagh O'Brien, Baron of Inchiquin, in 1580. It is now entirely gone. The other, Aherinagh, was still reasonably well preserved at the end of the 19th century. In 1580, it belonged to Donogh, son of Conor MacNamara.

== History ==
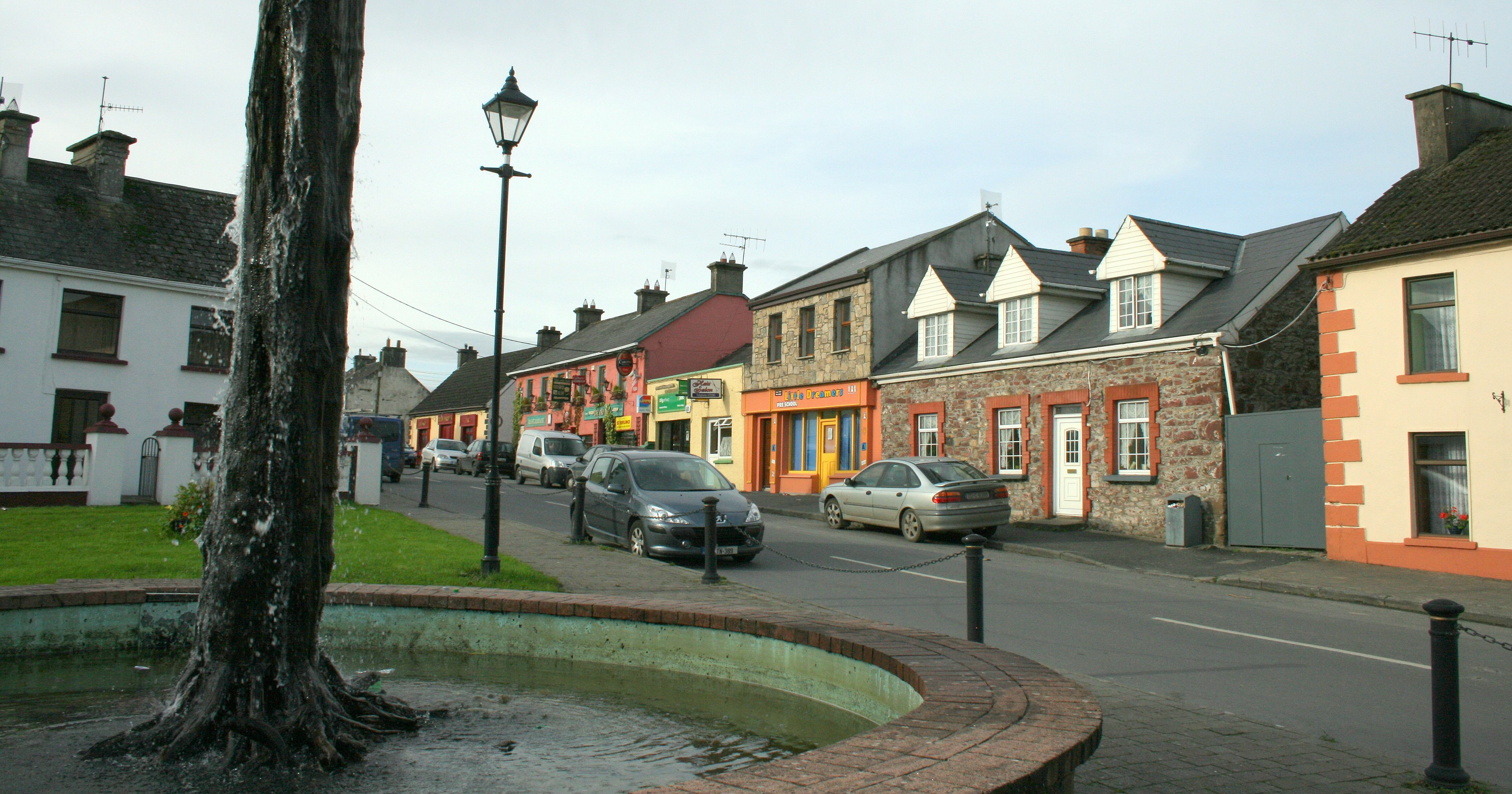
O'Briensbridge, County Clare

The first bridge across the river here was built in 1506 by Toirdhealbhach Donn Ó Briain, first Earl of Thomond and his brother, the Bishop of Killaloe. This first bridge was made of wood and was burned in 1510 by Gearóid Mór FitzGerald, 8th Earl of Kildare. The O'Briens rebuilt the bridge, this time erecting two castles, each with walls 12 feet (3.7 m) thick, one on each side of the river. The castles stood in the water close to the shore and were connected by a 7-arch wooden bridge that rose to 15 feet (4.6 m) above the water. This bridge was destroyed in 1536 by Leonard Grey, the Lord Deputy of Ireland under King Henry VIII of England, after an extended battle against the O'Briens, who had rebelled. A 12-arch stone bridge was built next. It was replaced around 1750, partially replaced in 1842, and modified to include a navigation arch in the 1920s.

The ancient river-crossing here is believed to be identical with Áth Caille (meaning "Ford of the Wood"): one of the three fords mentioned in the Triads of Ireland, the others being Áth Clíath (Dublin) and Áth Lúain (Athlone).

== Sports ==
The local soccer club is Bridge Celtic AFC, which was formed in 1963 and currently plays in the Clare Soccer League. The club won the Clare Premier title in 2006/07, for the first time in 28 years.

== Townlands ==
The parish contains the townlands of Aharinaghmore, Ardataggle, Ballybrack, Ballycar North, Ballycar South, Ballyknavin, Cappakea, Carrownagowan, Cloghera, Clonboy, Coolnalira, Coumbrack, Earlhill, Fahy Beg, Fahy More North, Fahy More South, Glenlon North, Glenlon South, Kilcredaun, Kilroughil, Knockaderreen, Knockdonagh, Lackareagh Beg, Lackareagh More, Magherareagh, O'Briensbridge, Ross, Roo East, Roo West and Trough.

== See also ==
- List of towns and villages in Ireland
- Montpelier, County Limerick
- O'Briensbridge-Montpelier
- O'Brien's Bridge (now Glenorchy, Tasmania)
