= Feenagh, County Clare =

Feenagh Fíonach
- Civil parish
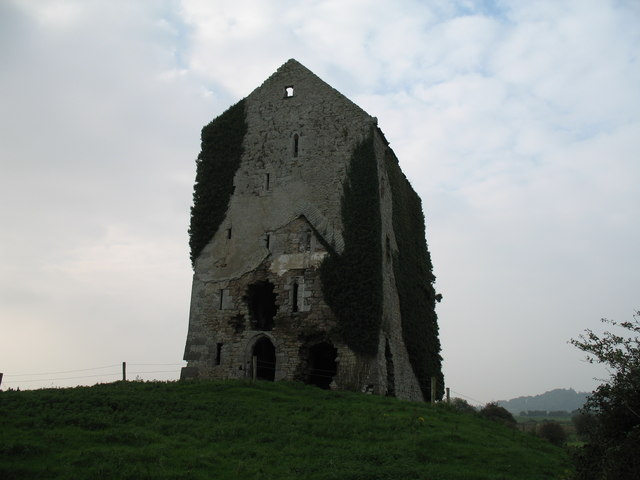
- Rossmanagher Castle

- Location within Ireland
- Coordinates: 52.743015°N 8.807003°W
- Country: Ireland
- County: Clare

Feenagh, or Finogh, Phinagh (Irish: Fíonach) is a civil parish in County Clare, Ireland.

== Location ==
Feenagh lies on the east border of the barony of Lower Bunratty. The name means a plain overgrown with brushwood. Feenagh is 1.5 miles (2.4 km) to the northwest of Sixmilebridge. The parish has an area of 2,854 acres (1,155 ha), about half of it craggy and the other half fertile. In 1837 there were 2,632 statute acres as applotted under the tithe act.

The parish contains the townlands of Ardkyle, Carrownalegaun, Cloghlea, Deerpark, Donnybrook, Feenagh (Moloney), Feenagh (Wilson), Newpark, Rath Beg, Rath More, Rossmanagher, Seersha and Springfield. There is a holy well at Rathmore, dedicated to Saint Mochuille. There are the ruins of an old castle at Rossmanagher.

== History ==
In 1580 the castle of Rosmanagher was owned by the Earl of Thomond. The learned family of the O'Maoelconerys lived for a long time in the townland of Adrkyle, where they ran a school teaching jurisprudence and general literature. In 1834 there were 1,074 Catholics and 22 Protestants. In 1841 the population was 1,018 in 153 houses. Fairs were held several times a year, mostly of sheep and pigs.
