= Kilkishen =

Village in County Clare, Ireland

Kilkishen Irish: Cill Chisín
- Village
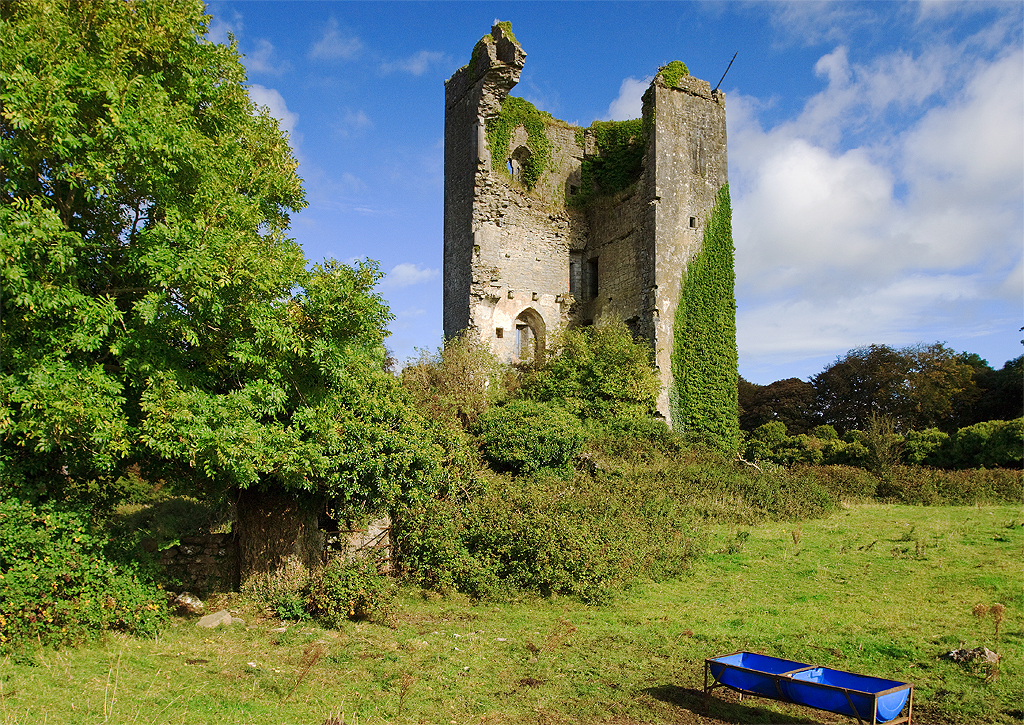
- Ruins of Kilkishen Castle, near the village

- Location in Ireland
- Coordinates: 52.8°N 8.73°W
- Country: Ireland
- Province: Munster
- County: County Clare
- Elevation: 31 m (102 ft)

Population (2022)
  - Total: 651
- Time zone: UTC+0 (WET)
  - Summer (DST): UTC-1 (IST (WEST))
- Irish Grid Reference: R496730

Kilkishen (Irish: Cill Chisín) is a village in southeast County Clare, Ireland. The village is 8 km (5 mi) east of Quin and 14 km (9 mi) north of Shannon.

== Demographics ==
According to a report by Samuel Lewis in 1837, Kilkishen had a population of 519. At the 2006 Census the population was 443, a rise from 324 at the 2002 Census. The population of the village, at the 2022 census, was 651.

== Facilities ==
Kilkishen is in the civil parish of Clonlea and in the Catholic parish of O'Callaghans Mills. and was owned by the Studderts of Kilkishen House. The first Catholic church at Kilkishen, St Senan's, was probably built very early in the 19th century. It is mentioned in an 1811 report of a dispute that led to violence over who should sit nearest to the altar. Major renovation or reconstruction of the church was completed in 1865.

The Protestant church in Kilkishen was erected in 1811. The church was later abandoned, but in 2014 the building was restored and converted into Kilkishen Cultural Centre.

Kilkishen National School is in the village and, according to their website, has an enrollment of 108 students.

The village is the home of the Clare Shout Festival, which was first held in 2006 and is now held annually in September. The history of the Clare Shout is uncertain, but is believed to date back to pre-Celtic times in Ireland.

The gateway of Glenwood House in Kilkishen was the site of an ambush by the IRA in 1921 which resulted in the death of four police constables. The site is now marked with three plaques on the gateway wall.

== Sport ==
Kilkishen GAA was a hurling team that is now defunct. The team won the Clare Senior Hurling Championship in 1923 and 1932 and were finalists in 1938. The village has a junior level camogie club.

== See also ==
- List of towns and villages in Ireland
