= Sixmilebridge =

Village in County Clare, Ireland

Sixmilebridge Irish: Droichead Abhann Ó gCearnaigh
- Village
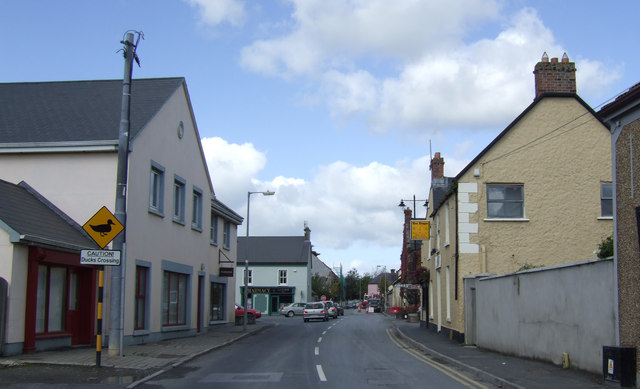
- Limerick Road, Sixmilebridge

- Location in Ireland
- Coordinates: 52.743°N 8.773°W
- Country: Ireland
- Province: Munster
- County: County Clare

Population (2022)
  - Total: 2,832
- Irish Grid Reference: R474664

Sixmilebridge (Irish: Droichead Abhann Ó gCearnaigh, meaning 'bridge of the river of O'Kearney') is a large village in County Clare, Ireland. Located midway between Ennis and Limerick city, the village is a short distance away from the main N18 road. Locally, it is commonly called 'the Bridge'.

Sixmilebridge partly serves as a dormitory village for workers in the Limerick city, Ennis and Shannon region, with a number of modern housing developments having been built to accommodate demand.

== History ==
Evidence of prehistorical settlement in the area dates to the Bronze Age, and a number of ringforts, mounds, enclosures and wedge tombs are located in the parish.

In antiquity, the name of the village was Cappagh (that name still present in local townlands), chiefly on the west side of the river, and Ballyarilla on the east. The name Cappagh is an anglicized form of an Irish word meaning a cultivated field, while Ballyarilla is named after the castle that once stood before Mount Ievers Court was built. An ancient name of the river appears to be Raite, today anglicised into Ratty; as the river flows past Bunratty Castle into the Shannon Estuary, it is still known as the Ratty. Kilfinaghty seemed to always be the name of the parish of Sixmilebridge. The village was under the Lordship of Thomond, especially the McNamaras and the O'Briens. It is assumed that the original local lords were the O'Garneys, but there is little reference to them in the histories. It is possible that the O'Ahernes were also ruling lords at a different time.

Coolmeen Lake, located in a valley in the hills east of Sixmilebridge, played an important part in the 13th-century "Wars of Turlough". During the fighting, Lochlainn MacNamara and his nephew were given safe conduct by the Norman De Clares, their rivals, to enter their castle without being harmed. But that was merely a trap, and the Irish were captured, marched from the Bunratty Castle to Coolmeen Lake, and executed there. Soon after, the De Clares were defeated at the Battle of Dysert O'Dea. The lake has since enjoyed a somewhat sinister reputation, with numerous legends of monstrous eels, witch-hares, and bottomless pits associated with the lake.

Sixmilebridge played a part in the Cromwellian conquest of Ireland. The following passage is from The History and Topography of the County of Clare, by James Frost:

Immediately after Ludlow returned to Limerick, the Clare forces, under David Roche, son of Lord Fermoy, sent a message from Quin, by a woman, to Hugh O’Neill, Commander-in-Chief of the Garrison of Limerick, to the effect that they were about to come to his aid, and that they would wait at Sixmilebridge to learn from him how they could best render assistance. The woman was intercepted by the English at Thomondgate, and being conducted into the presence of one of their generals whom she was taught to believe to be O’Neill, she delivered her message. The information she possessed being extracted from the poor creature, they hanged her, "for fear of giving further intelligence", as they said.

The account goes on to tell that the garrison at Sixmilebridge were to move to Limerick when a light would be exhibited from "the mountain of Glenagross", i.e. Woodcock Hill, on 31 July. When the Cromwellian forces discovered this, they strengthened their garrison at Meelick Pass in response; in that time, the Pass would have been the main road to Limerick.

The main English lords of the area were the Ievers of Mount Ievers, the Butlers of Castlecrine, and the D'Esterres of Rossmanagher. All three of their houses (two of which have been demolished) are built on the site of earlier castles. After the Ievers came, building their seat on Ballyarilla Castle, that side of the river became known as Ieverstown, the other O'Brienstown. Sixmilebridge surpassed both these names in the 18th century.

The unusual English name of the village derives, as Thomas Dineley who visited Sixmilebridge in 1681, describes:

From Bunratty, the seat of the Earl of Thomond, into the town of Sixmilebridge, belonging also to that noble family, is 3 miles; from whence to the city of Limerick, to which are two ways, namely by the oil mills and the seat of the McNamaras beyond it, or over the high mountain, famous for its admirable prospect, hanging as it were over Sixmilebridge town and commonly known as Gallows Hill; this is the upper, the other the lower way to Limerick and from town to the city six miles either way, whence the town hath its name.

The units given here are Irish miles, equal to about 2 km, Sixmilebridge to Limerick is thus about 12 km.

The original village grew up around a crossing place on the O'Garney River. By the end of the 17th century development was tied to the industrialisation of the area as people of Dutch origin found the river very suitable for milling. This ended abruptly with the building of a toll bridge on the river by Henry D'Esterre (Ó Dálaigh 2004). D'Esterre's construction gained a profit from people crossing the river but halted the trading done with Holland.

According to local tradition, the famous duel between Daniel O'Connell and a member of the D'Esterre family in February 1815 arose from O'Connell's refusal to pay the toll. This conflicts with the conventional account of the duel. D'Esterre lost his life, but the toll bridge survived and remains standing to this day.

=== 1852 election affray and massacre ===
On 22 July 1852, a magistrate and eight soldiers of the 31st Regiment escorted 18 tenants of the Marquess of Conyngham to Sixmilebridge to vote for Colonel Vandeleur in the County Clare constituency at the general election. Vandeleur was a Conservative opposed to tenants' rights. A crowd of protesters, including two Catholic priests, was gathered near the ballot office, and an affray began between them and the voters' party. Soldiers opened fire, without the Riot Act having been read. Six people were killed at the scene and eight wounded, one of whom later died. At the coroner's inquest, the jury returned a verdict of murder; this was overturned by the Attorney-General for Ireland. An article in the Anglo-Celt accused the regiment of "willful and deliberate murder", and the editor was jailed for libel. The affair was discussed at Westminster, where Conservative members demanded the priests be prosecuted for incitement. The events generated lingering bitterness and tension.

=== Parishes and churches ===
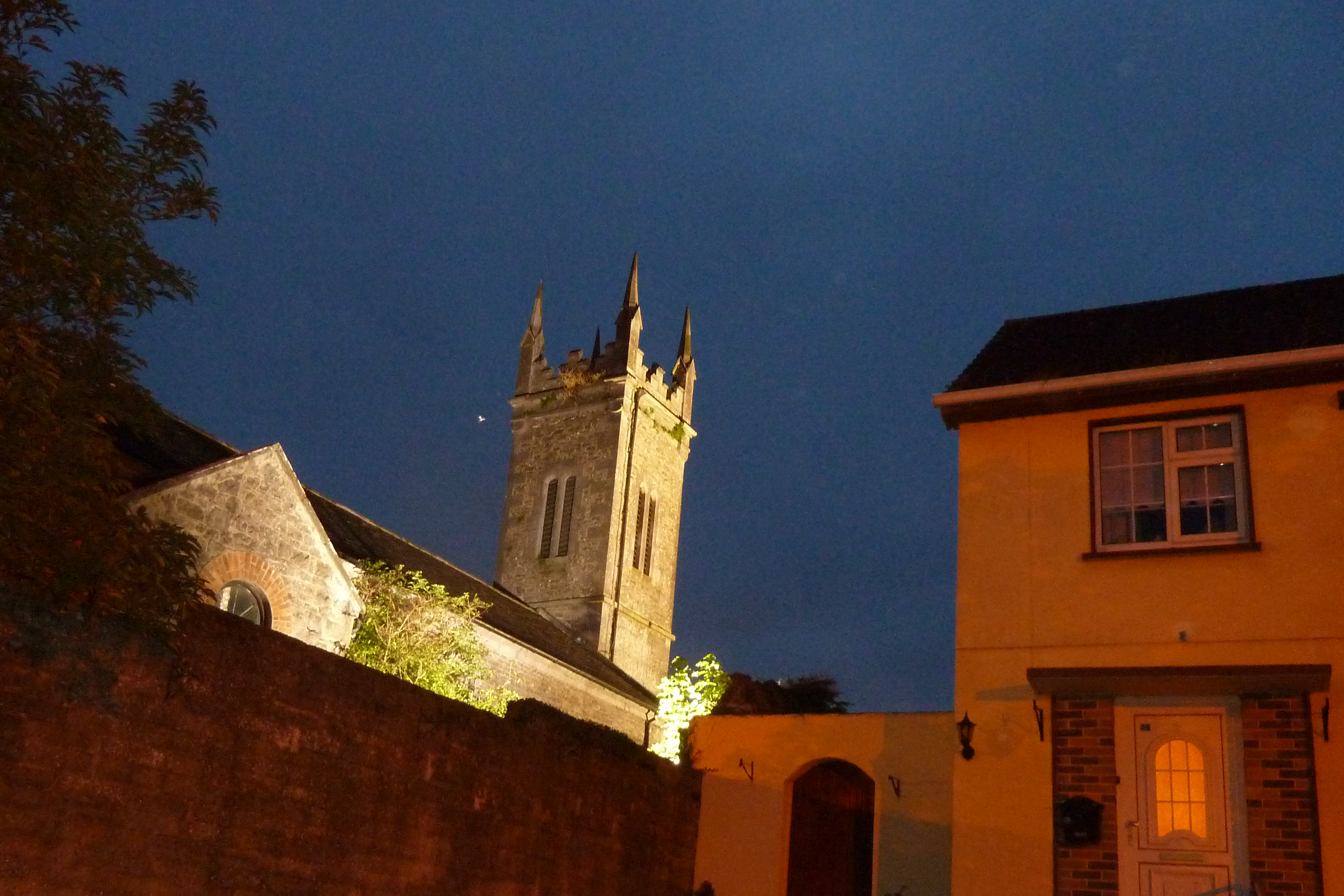
Former Anglican parish church

In 1837, the village was split between the Church of Ireland parishes of Kilfentinan and Kilfinaghty while the Roman Catholic parish of Sixmilebridge was a union of the Kilmurry-Negaul, Kilfinaghta and Feenagh parishes.

The church of St. Finnachta was built in 1812 in Sixmilebridge, a thatched building with a mud floor. In 1980 the building was reconstructed and considerably enlarged. This is the only church in use in the Catholic parish of Sixmilebridge, which is in the Roman Catholic Diocese of Killaloe. The Little Church, of Cratloe-Sixmilebridge parish, on the Limerick Road, is part of the Diocese of Limerick. It is less than 500 metres (1,600 ft) away from St. Finnachta's.

The former Church of Ireland (Anglican) building on Church Street, Kilfinaghty Church, is now used as the local branch of Clare County Library.

Arguably the oldest church in the parish is that of Ballysheen, reputedly built in the 12th century by Saint Finaghta. It is in a poor state, with two of the four walls still standing. Its surrounding graveyard is still a popular burial place for people of the parish.

Feenagh church, southwest of Sixmilebridge, is also a very old church. Feenagh was once a separate parish to Kilfinaghta.

== Tourism ==
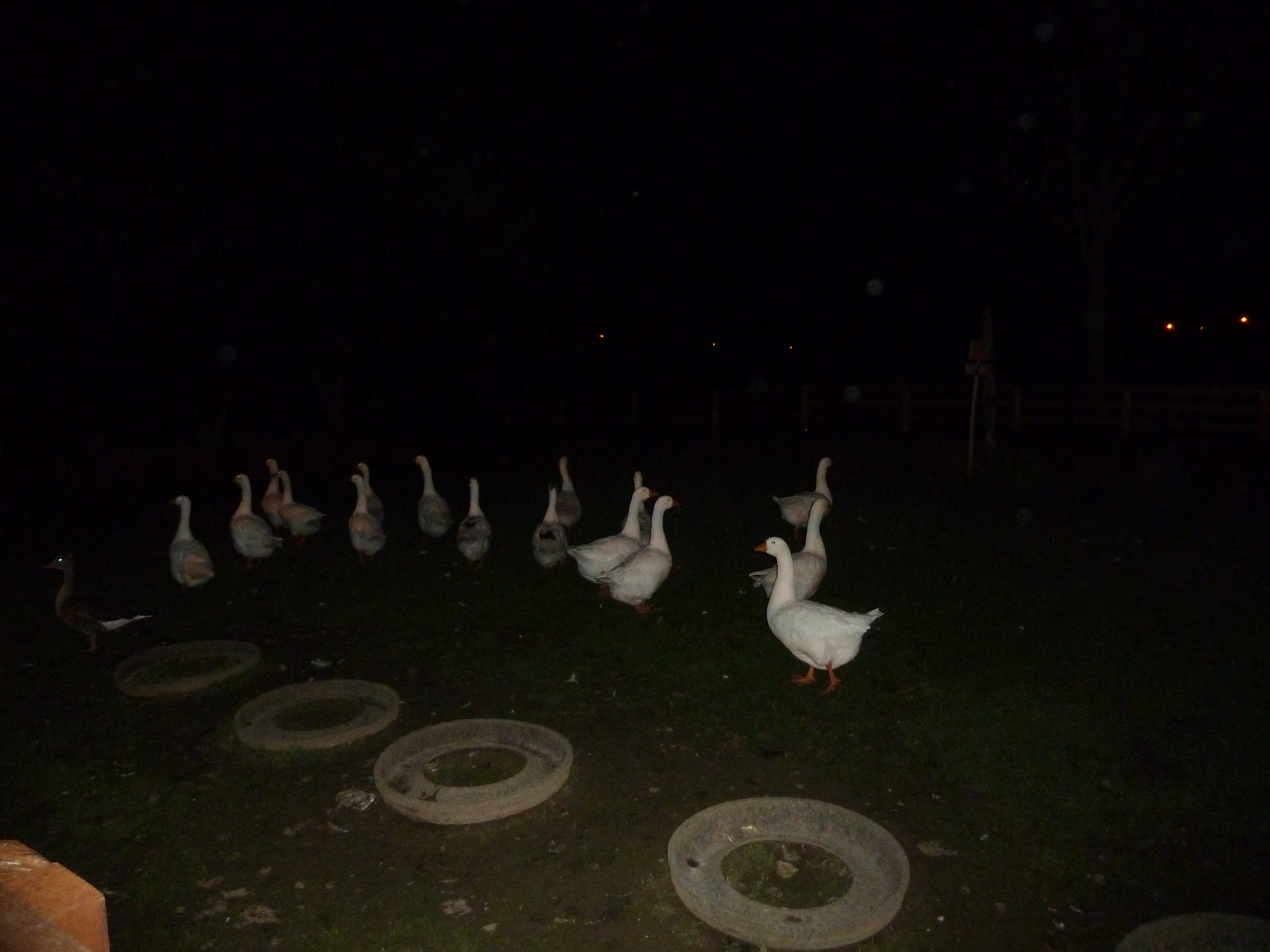
A flock of geese in Sixmilebridge

The Sixmilebridge Winter Music Weekend is an annual festival, held in January, which has run since 2000. It was established by the Sixmilebridge Folk Club. It hosts a range of singers, instrumentalists, dancers and storytellers in a variety of musical styles.

A decorated 'duck inn' on the O'Garney River is occupied by a thriving population of ducks. The 'duck inn' is a floating raft with glass windows and painted walls. It houses the ducks during winter and is also where their locally consumed eggs are hatched and collected. It forms part of the tourist trail of Sixmilebridge.

== Education ==
There are two primary schools in the Sixmilebridge Parish, namely Sixmilebridge National School and Kilmurry National School. For secondary education, students go to schools in Limerick, Shannon, Ennis and Tulla.

== Sports ==
=== Gaelic games ===
Sports are prominent in the area with locals partaking in hurling and soccer. The local GAA club is Sixmilebridge GAA and gets its players from the Sixmilebridge area. The club was formed in 1904 mainly as a Gaelic football club, but also played hurling, the sport that is now most associated with the club. The land used was donated to the GAA by the Casey family. Nowadays the club participates at hurling, camogie and scór. The club is well known for its hurling and many players from there have represented their county with some having won the Munster and All-Ireland Hurling championships with Clare at Senior, Junior and Minor levels. The club also won an All-Ireland club title (becoming the first team from Clare to have won it) on 17 March (St. Patrick's day) 1996.

=== Football ===
The local soccer (football) club is called Bridge United AFC. The club was formed in 1967. They have enjoyed success, with some players receiving trials with professional clubs in England down through the years. They won the Clare and District Soccer League Premier Division title in the 1972/73 season. They have since repeated that feat twice, in 2002/03 and 2005/06, respectively.

=== Other sports ===
There is a pitch and putt and nine-hole golf course at Kilmurry, Sixmilebridge, which is open year-round.

There are a number of sport societies and clubs in the area which cater to Sixmilebridge and District. There is the Kilmurry Community Games, Sixmilebridge Golf Society, Bridge Milers Olympic Harriers Athletic Club {BMOH AC}, Tradaree Coursing Club, Sixmilebridge Gun Club and Kilmurry Gun Club.

=== Angling ===
As well as the river, there are many lakes in the area such as Mountcashel lake and these waters provide a chance to catch coarse pike, bream and roach. Game fish such as trout and salmon can also be caught in the river but certain laws and rules apply. The Sixmilebridge Angling Club maintains and protects fish levels and angling throughout the Owen O'Garney River system.

== Transport ==
The Limerick–Ennis-Athenry railway line passes through the village. Sixmilebridge railway station opened on 17 January 1859 and finally closed on 17 June 1963. It was reopened on 29 March 2010 as part of the reopening of the Western Rail Corridor.

== Notable people ==
- Brendan O'Regan, businessman

== See also ==
- List of towns and villages in Ireland
