= Paul O'Brien (scholar) =

Irish language scholar and catholic priest

Rev. Paul O'Brien (1763–1820) was an Irish language scholar and Catholic priest. He was the first Professor of Irish at St. Patrick's College, Maynooth, serving from 1802 until his death.

Born in 1763, from Cormeen, Co. Meath, O'Brien was a great-grandnephew of Turlough O'Carolan.

In 1807 O'Brien was instrumental in establishing The Gaelic Society of Dublin along with Dr. John Lanigan, Edward O'Reilly, William Halliday, and Theophilus O'Flanagan. Professor O'Brien was also involved in Iberno-Celtic Society another initiative to promote the Irish Language.

== Publications ==
- A Practical Grammar of the Irish Language by Paul O'Brien (1809).
