= R462 road (Ireland) =

Road in Ireland

Coordinates: 53.483133°N 8.507359°W

R462 road
- Bóthar R462
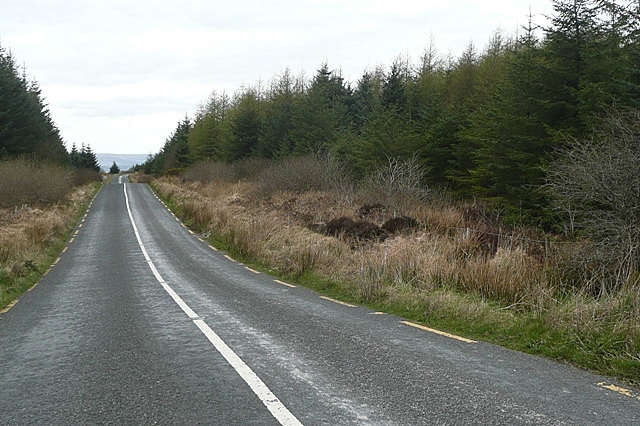
- R462 passes through Loughaun forestry

Route information
- Length: 41.6 km (25.8 mi)

Major junctions
- From: R458 Tiraloughan
- Enters County Clare; Passes through Tulla; R352 Loughaun South; Passes through Kilkishen; R469 Kilmurry-Negaul; R470 Sixmilebridge; R471 Clonlara
- To: N18 Cratloe

Location
- Country: Ireland

Highway system
- Roads in Ireland; Motorways; Primary; Secondary; Regional

The R462 road is a regional road in Ireland, located in County Clare and County Galway.
