= R458 road (Ireland) =

Road in Ireland

Coordinates: 53.053075°N 8.816260°W

R458 road
- Bóthar R458
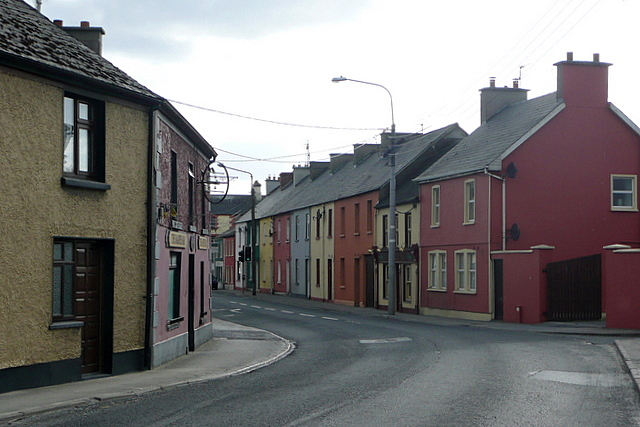
- Main Street, Clarecastle, part of the R458

Route information
- Length: 49.5 km (30.8 mi)

Major junctions
- From: N67 Kilcolgan
- R461 Gort Tiraloughan; R462 Tiraloughan; Enters County Clare; M18 Junction 15; M18 Junction 14; R871 Ennis; R352 Ennis; R474 Ennis; R475 Ennis; R469 Ennis; N85 Ennis; R473 Ennis; Crosses River Fergus and River Rine; M18 Junction 11; R470 Newmarket-on-Fergus; R472 Boheraroan; N18 Shannon
- To: R471 Clonmoney

Location
- Country: Ireland

Highway system
- Roads in Ireland; Motorways; Primary; Secondary; Regional

The R458 road is a long regional road in Ireland, located in County Clare and County Galway.
