= Gaelic Society of Dublin =

The Gaelic Society of Dublin was an effort to save and support the Irish language. The society first met on 19 January 1807. Theophilus O'Flanagan AB, acted as its first secretary. Involved in the setting up of the society were Dr. John Lanigan, Richard MacElligott, Edward O'Reilly, William Halliday, and Maynooth College Irish professor Father Paul O'Brien. Pat Lynch acted as secretary from 1815.

Published in 1808, The Transactions of the Gaelic Society of Dublin was one of the first printed documents on the Irish language and documented Gaelic customs such as Brehon law.

The society petered out. A number of years later another effort was made by some of those involved in the society by creating the Iberno-Celtic Society in 1818. Another initiative was the Irish Archaeological Society of 1840. In 1854, it merged with the Dublin Celtic Society, which had formed in 1845. The Ossianic Society, established in Dublin in 1853, was a rival to the Irish Archaeological and Celtic Society. Other efforts were made by the Society for the Preservation of the Irish Language in 1877, and its successor in the Gaelic Union in 1880. Ultimately the Gaelic revival succeeded with the successful establishment of the Gaelic League in 1892.
