= Crusheen =

Village in County Clare, Ireland

Crusheen Croisín
- Village
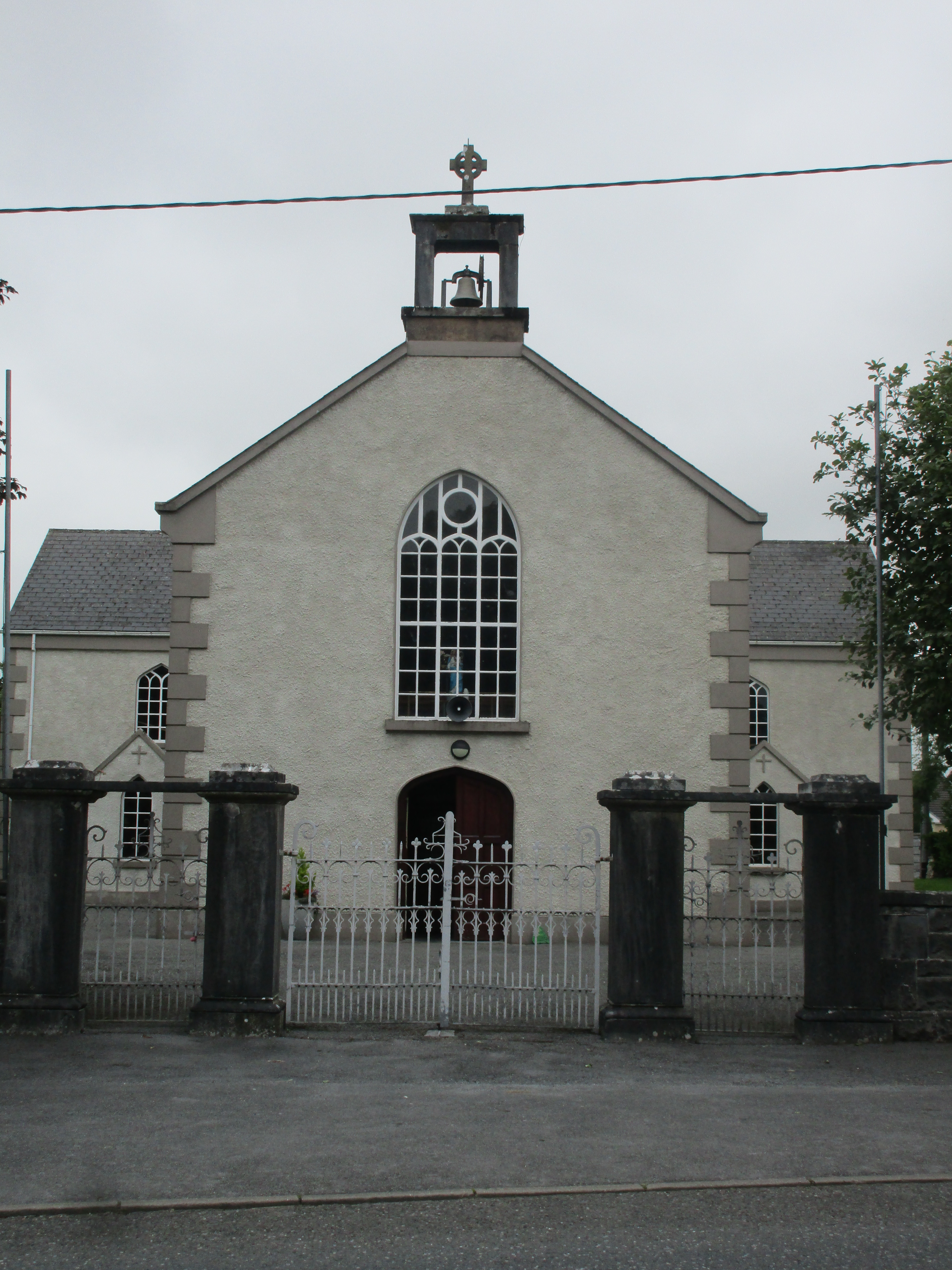
- Saint Cronan's Catholic Church

- Location in Ireland
- Coordinates: 52°56′22.93″N 8°53′49.9″W
- Country: Ireland
- Province: Munster
- County: County Clare

Population (2022)
  - Total: 649
- Time zone: UTC+0 (WET)
  - Summer (DST): UTC-1 (IST (WEST))

Crusheen (Irish: Croisín, meaning 'little cross') is a small village in County Clare, Ireland, in the civil parish of Crusheen (Inchicronan).

== Location ==
The village is 10 kilometres northeast of Ennis on the R458 road to Gort. It is in the parish of Crusheen (Inchicronan) in the Roman Catholic Diocese of Killaloe. The parish church of St Cronan is in Crusheen. The village consists of the church, Garda station, two public houses, post office, a supermarket, petrol station, funeral home. The local GAA club is Crusheen GAA. There is also a community centre and a national (primary) school. Crusheen National School, also known as Inchicronan Central National School, had an enrollment of 147 pupils as of September 2021.

The main RTÉ television and radio transmitter at Maghera mountain is located east-northeast of the village.

According to census results, the electoral division surrounding Crusheen saw 20% population growth between 2006 and 2011 (from 720 to 864 people). In the same period (2006–2011), the village population grew from 377 to 467 people. As of the 2022 census, the village had a population of 649.

Villages which are close to Crusheen include Barefield, Ballinruan, Clooney and Ruan.

== Transport ==
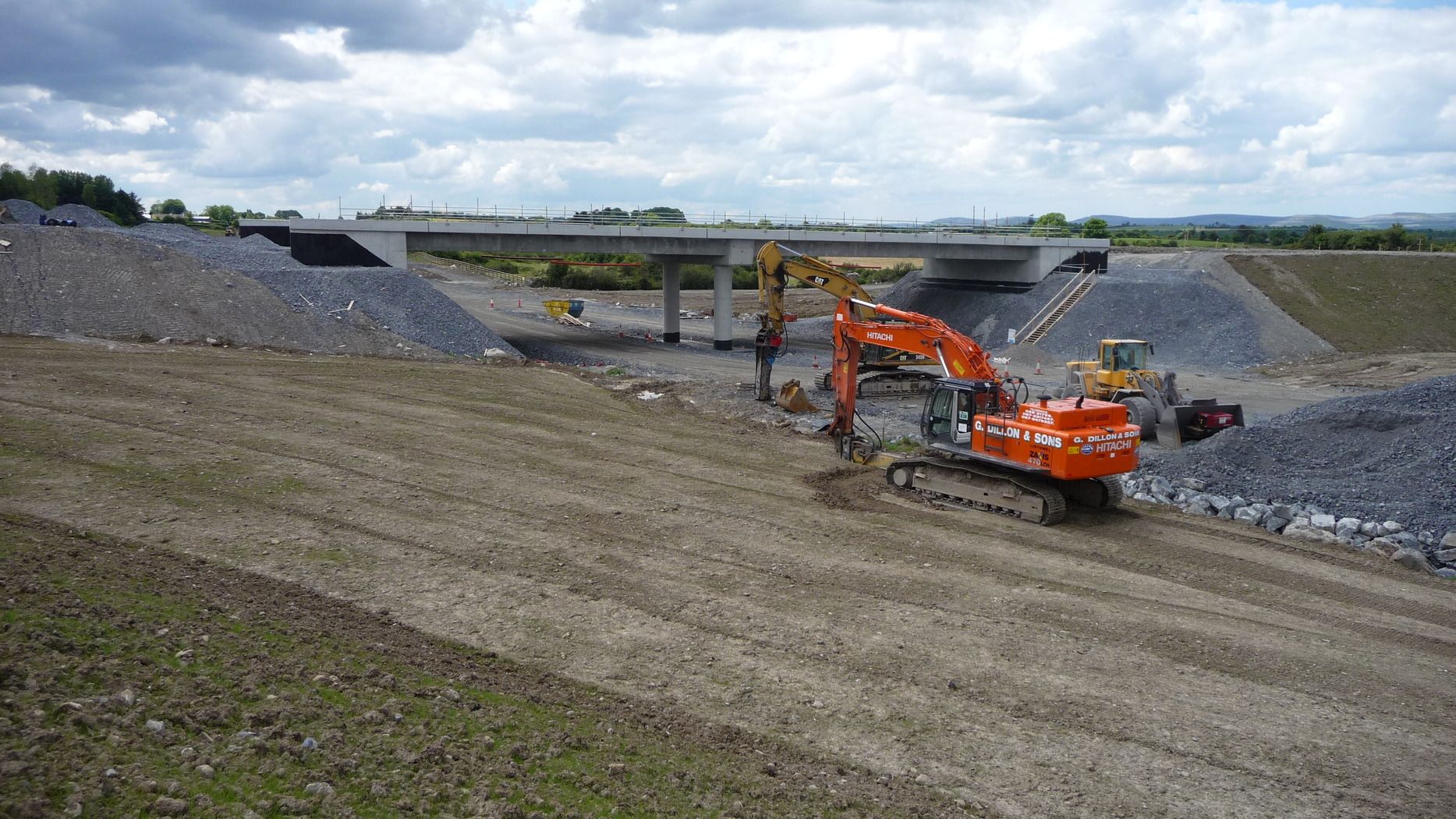
Work on the M18, that took much of the non-local traffic away from the village after completion

The M18 motorway passes west of the village and provides a connection with Galway, Ennis, Limerick and Shannon Airport. Bus Éireann provides an hourly service to the area via route number 51.

A former train station, Crusheen railway station, provided passenger services to the village from the mid-19th century until its closure in 1976. The railway line still runs through the village, and the nearest stations today are Ennis and Gort.

== Notable people ==
- Cian Dillon, hurler with Crusheen GAA club
- Kieren Fallon, jockey
- Eddie Lenihan, author and storyteller
