= R353 road =

R353 road may refer to:

- R353 road (Ireland)
- R353 road (South Africa)
