= Cratloe =

Village in County Clare, Ireland

Cratloe An Chreatalach
- Village
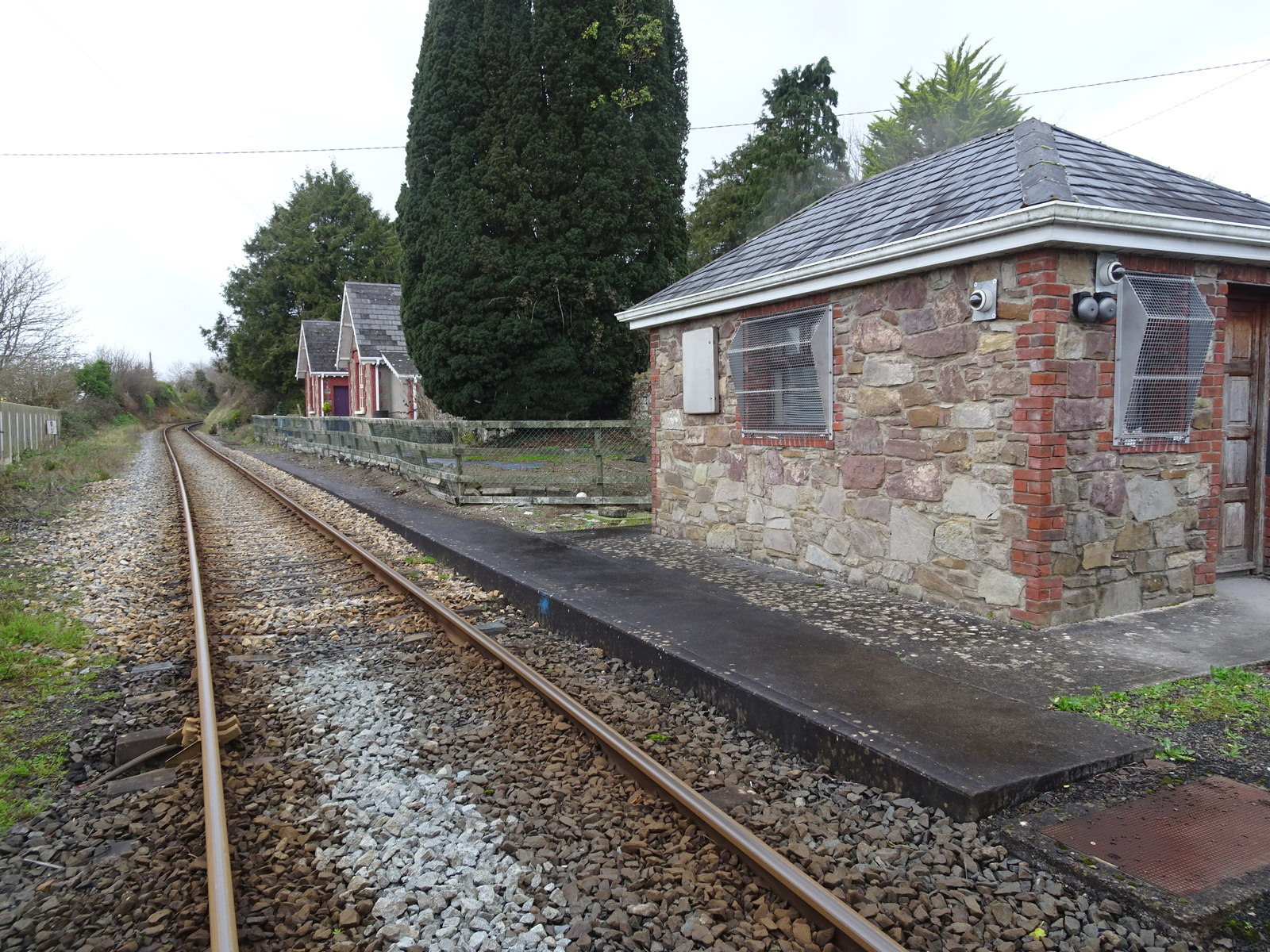
- Site of Cratloe railway station, which opened in 1859 and closed in 1963

- Location in Ireland
- Coordinates: 52°41′55″N 8°45′47″W
- Country: Ireland
- Province: Munster
- County: County Clare

Area
  - Total: 1.459 km^{2} (0.563 sq mi)

Population (2022)
  - Total: 899
  - Density: 616/km^{2} (1,600/sq mi)
- Time zone: UTC+0 (WET)
  - Summer (DST): UTC-1 (IST (WEST))
- Irish Grid Reference: R402624
- Website: www.clarecoco.ie

Historical population
Year	Pop.	±%
1841	1,988	—
1851	1,310	−34.1%
1861	1,141	−12.9%
1871	761	−33.3%
1881	737	−3.2%
1891	662	−10.2%
1901	585	−11.6%
1911	529	−9.6%
1926	514	−2.8%
1936	540	+5.1%
1946	514	−4.8%
1951	500	−2.7%
1956	470	−6.0%
1961	430	−8.5%
1966	454	+5.6%
1971	562	+23.8%
1979	1,078	+91.8%
1981	1,038	−3.7%
1986	1,146	+10.4%
1991	1,334	+16.4%
1996	1,173	−12.1%
2002	1,360	+15.9%
2006	1,504	+10.6%
2011	1,438	−4.4%
2016	692	−51.9%
2022	899	+29.9%

Cratloe (Irish: An Chreatalach) is a village in County Clare, Ireland, situated between Limerick and Shannon in the mid-west region. It is possible that the name derives from Croit-shliabh meaning "hump-backed hill", referring to Woodcock Hill. The present-day parish of Cratloe consists of the former parish of Kilfintinan and a portion of the contemporary parish of Killeely. This was agreed upon by priests in the 18th century, who claimed there were not enough members of the clergy to operate fully in both parishes.

== History ==
The area of Cratloe is first mentioned in the Annals of the Four Masters, where it is recorded that in 376 AD, Crimthann mac Fidaig, King of Munster and High King of Ireland died in the Cratloe area from poison administered by his sister, Mongfind, who wished for her son Brión mac Echach Muigmedóin to be High King. Mongfind herself also died later, as she drank the poison to convince the king to take some. In the end, however, Brian had to settle for the Kingdom of Connaught, while the High Kingship went to his half-brother, who was later known as Niall of the Nine Hostages.

In the 9th century, when the McNamaras territory was invaded by warriors from the Kingdom of Aileach in Ulster, the invaders chopped down oak trees in Cratloe Woods and brought them back to Ulster for the roof of the Aileach Royal Palace. Cratloe Woods have since been known for their oak trees and their wood used in many important buildings throughout Europe.

It was recorded in 940 that King Muirchertach of the Leather Cloaks and his forces, found that Cretshalach, as it was then known, was the worst passageway during their Circuit of Ireland. In ancient times the passageway through Cratloe ran over a steep hill, and was the main route from Munster into Connacht. The army stayed the night on top of the mountain where High King Crimthann was murdered, Sliabh-Suidhe-an-riogh, or in English, The Mountain Of The Death Of The King.

Cormacan the Poet, the Chief Bard

"We were a night at Ath-Caille,
On the very brink of the Shannon:
I did not meet, since I left my home,
A pass like unto Cretshalach."

In 1216 it was formally granted to the Corporation of Limerick by King John, as part of the North Liberties. In 1510, an Anglo-Irish army led by Gerald Mór FitzGerald, the 8th earl of Kildare, marched on Thomond, and was met and defeated near Cratloe by an army of the O'Brien, McNamara, Sil-Aedha and Clanrickard clans led by Turlough O'Brien, son of Teige Mac Murrough O'Brien, the Lord of Thomond. The invading army were defeated with ease as the entire force had taken the short cut through Cratloe into Limerick, and as a result were ambushed by the Gaelic army. It was annexed to the County of Clare following the 1840 Municipal Corporations (Ireland) Act.

== Geography ==
Cratloe is bounded to the south by the tidal estuary of the River Shannon, and to the west by the Ratty/ Uí gCearnaigh (Garney) river. A large part of the eastern boundary is formed by a creek known locally as the Sandy River, or the Cratloe Creek. With the exceptions of a few low hills, the portion of Cratloe south of the N18 dual-carriageway, and west of the R462 to Sixmilebridge mainly consists of the low lying flood plains of the tidal rivers. The farmlands in these areas are protected by levees. The remainder of the parish consists of the south-western and western portion of Woodcock Hill, which summits at 310 m (1,016 ft) just outside Cratloe's boundary. The western side of this hill is commonly known as Gallows Hill, named after the executions of rebels by Cromwellian forces that took place here around the year 1650.

=== Cratloe Woods ===
A state forest has been planted over a large portion of the Cratloe area, with mostly spruce and pine trees covering the 800 acre woodland. On the back road to Limerick that passes through the village, the ancient oak trees of Garranon Wood are still visible, and the forest has been historically dated to exist from at least 700 AD. The oak trees from this forest provided the timbers for the roofs of London's Westminster Hall and the Royal Palace in Amsterdam. St Mary's Cathedral in Limerick city was also built using Cratloe timber.

== Places of interest ==
The area around Cratloe village contains several ancient and medieval sites. One of the oldest historic sites in the village itself is in the Craughaun Cemetery, where a megalithic wedge tomb, known as the Ballinphunta Dolmen, was discovered. This tomb was excavated in 1990 during an enlargement of the graveyard and a replica erected some time later in the newer section of the graveyard. Also in this graveyard is a vault to the Blood family, dating to 1738 when the first member of the family, Robert Maghlin, was buried. The ruins of the old Craughaun Church, dating from 1418, are also present.

D'Esterre Bridge, built in 1784, crossing the Ratty/O'gChearnaigh River between Bunratty and Sixmilebridge, is characterised by the ruins of the gate-towers remaining from its days as a toll-crossing. Henry D'Esterre built this bridge at his own expense as he wanted a crossing close to his own estate. The famous duel in February 1815 between Daniel O'Connell and Henry D'Esterre's son, John Norcot, arose in local tradition because O'Connell refused to pay the toll, although this conflicts with the conventional account of the duel.

Within the Garranon Oak Wood, a roadside well known as the Squire's Well can be found. The novelist and travel writer Georgiana Chatterton stated in 1841 that it flows from a clear stream, but over the time it has not been used, it has nearly been swallowed up in foliage and natural growth. The remnants of several small ráths, or ring-forts are located in various fields around Cratloe, although several of these forts were destroyed when the Western Railway Corridor was built in the late 19th century.

=== Castles ===
Cratloe is the location of several ruined castles and tower houses, including Cratloemoyle Castle (sometimes referred to as 'Cratloe Castle'), located just to the north of the N18 road on the approach to Limerick. The castle is 5 stories high and was built sometime in the early 1500s. John McNamara, who died in 1780, was the last occupant of the castle and as he had no one to pass the castle onto, the castle was sold and for the first time in 700 years the land around the castle was not in the possession of the McNamara family.

Less than half a mile away, on the opposite side of the road, Cratloekeel Castle sits on a low outcrop, and can be seen from the road among the surrounding trees. This castle was built by Sean McNamara in the latter part of the 15th century, but by 1641 it had passed out of the McNamara family and was owned by a Dutch Protestant.

Further south, on the banks of the River Shannon, is the site of Castle Donnell or Cratloemore Castle, though now little of the ruins are left. This was once one of the biggest castles in Cratloe, being used by the McNamaras as a trading post because of its location on the River Shannon and its proximity to both Bunratty and Limerick. In 1730 most of this castle was destroyed and the stones were used to build Cratloe Wood House, the only example of an Irish longhouse still lived in by a family.

On the western slopes of Woodcock Hill, towards Sixmilebridge, the ruins of Ballintlea Castle lie in a farmyard. All of these castles are recorded as being built by the MacNamara clan, one of the most powerful families in the Kingdom of Thomond.

=== Churches and graveyards ===
In addition to the parish church, the Church of St. John, Cratloe, there is another church within the parish, on the approach to the village of Sixmilebridge. This church is known locally as "The Little Church", and is unusual in that it is not dedicated to any particular saint. This church was built in the late 1700s but was demolished in 1858 and replaced with a new edifice. Again this church was renovated in 1988, with the Bishop of Limerick calling it "the little gem of the Limerick Diocese".

The ruins of several other chapels and churches can be found in the area. As mentioned above, there is one such ruin within the cemetery at Craughaun, and there is another near Cratloemoyle Castle, which was not really a church but an oratory for the owners of the castle. This oratory, together with the nearby well, were dedicated to St. John. In his 1893 work The History and Topography of the County of Clare, James Frost mentions that one Augustus Stafford O'Brien MP removed the ruins of a friary from the grounds of his residence, Cratloe Woods House, apparently because it interfered with the view. The ruins of the medieval parish church and cemetery of Kilfintenan can be found in the townland of Carrowmore on the road from Sixmilebridge to Gallows Hill. Kilfintenan graveyard is known as the smallest graveyard in Ireland. This graveyard was reserved for burying children and strangers who were travelling though the parish. The ruins of Cill an Bothair, or the Church of the Road, can also be found in the north of the parish. The graveyard of this church was again specifically used as a burial grounds for children. Kilcredaunnadober Graveyard in the townland of Cratloemore was a small burial ground for unbaptised children.

== Transport ==
Bus Éireann route 317, from Ennis to Limerick, serves Cratloe.

The N18 national primary road, that connects Limerick and Galway, bypasses the town. The road splits in two south of Cratloe, with one direction going towards Limerick proper and the other bypassing the city via the Limerick Tunnel just outside the city. The R462 regional road, which begins at the Cratloe exit from the N18, connects the towns of Sixmilebridge and Tulla and the villages of Kilkishen and Kilmurry to Limerick. Shannon Airport and the Shannon Free Zone are located 15 km away from the village.

The railway line from Limerick to Ennis also passes through the village, although the station remains closed at present. Cratloe railway station opened on 17 January 1859, but finally closed on 17 June 1963. As of 2008 it was hoped, with the re-opening of the Western Railway Corridor in 2010, that Cratloe Station would again be operational in the future. As of 2023, the station is still closed and used as a private dwelling.

== Education ==
The local primary school is St. Johns National School, located just across the road from Cratloe Church. There were two previous schools before this school was built in 1980, the first one was built in 1849 and is now the local community hall and the second was built in 1965 and is now a small shopping area. Both these schools were built because of the expanding population. The present school, St. Johns National School, had an enrollment of 285 pupils as of 2023.

== Sport ==
The most played sports in Cratloe are Gaelic games, although sports such as rugby and soccer have been catching up. In terms of Gaelic games, 2014 was the most successful year for Cratloe GAA club, as the Clare Senior Hurling Championship and the Clare Senior Football Championship was won, making Cratloe the first club in 85 years to win both senior county titles since Ennis Dalcassians achieved it in 1929. This year also marked Cratloe's second Clare Senior Hurling Championship title, with the first coming five years earlier in 2009.

== Notable people ==
- Naomi Carroll, international hockey player.
- Podge Collins, Gaelic footballer and hurler
- Conor McGrath, All-Star hurler
- Conor Ryan, All-Ireland winning hurler

== See also ==
- List of towns and villages in Ireland
