= John Lanigan (historian) =

Irish historian

- Born: 1758; Cashel, County Tipperary, Ireland
- Died: 7 July 1828 (aged 69–70); Finglas, Dublin, Ireland
- Resting place: Finglas, Dublin, Ireland
- Education: Irish College in Rome; University of Pavia (DD, 1794.)
- Occupations: Catholic Priest, Ecclesiastical Historian
- Known for: Irish Church historian, author of An Ecclesiastical History of Ireland

John Lanigan (1758 – 7 July 1828) was an Irish historian. Born in County Tipperary, he studied at the Irish College in Rome. He was a professor at the University of Pavia, where he earned a Doctor of Divinity degree. When Napoleon's army took the city, he lost most of his possessions, and returned to Ireland destitute. Lanigan found difficulty obtaining a clerical appointment due to suspicions of having Jansenist sympathies. He became sub-librarian at the Royal Dublin Society and was involved in the literary life of the city.

Lanigan is most known for his massive and detailed work The Ecclesiastical History of Ireland, published in four volumes.

== Life ==
John Lanigan was born in 1758 in Cashel, County Tipperary, Ireland, the eldest of sixteen children born to Thomas and Mary Anne (Dorkan) Lanigan. His father was a schoolmaster. He received his early training from his father and in a private Protestant Classical school at Cashel, similar Catholic schools being forbidden in Ireland at that time by law.

He decided to become a priest, and was encouraged by James Butler. In 1776, at the age of sixteen, on the recommendation of James Butler, Archbishop of Cashel, Lanigan received a burse to study at the Irish College at Rome. He sailed from Cork to London, where he was robbed of his money by a fellow-passenger; but fortunately a priest afforded him a refuge in his house until a remittance from home enabled him to continue his journey to Rome.

In Italy, he found inspiration in the scholarship and ideals of Muratori. Along with his classmate Charles O'Conor (1764–1828), he joined the academy of Cortona, which promoted the study and archeology of Etruscan culture. Cortona was a centre of Jasenism, a controversial religious movement founded by Dutch theologian Cornelius Otto Jansen (1585–1638). While Jansen attempted to reform the Catholic Church in the direction of the original Christian teachings, the papacy rejected him.

Lanigan demonstrated great ability in his studies, and after a rapid course, he was ordained to the priesthood. By the advice of Pietro Tamburini, an open supporter of Jasenism, he left Rome and accepted the chair of ecclesiastical history and Hebrew in the University of Pavia, where he worked as a professor from 1789 to 1796. In 1786 he refused to take part in the famous diocesan Synod of Pistoia, though offered the position of theologian to the synod.

In 1793 he published his Institutionum biblicarum pars prima (Pavia), a learned work concerning the history of the books of the Old and New Testaments; the two other parts which he had planned were not written. On 28 June 1794, he received the degree of Doctor of Divinity from the University of Pavia.

On the Napoleonic invasion two years later, the city was sacked and the university dispersed. Lanigan fled in such haste that he left most of his property behind. He returned to Ireland, arriving at Cork destitute. His application to Francis Moylan, Bishop of Cork, for pecuniary assistance was unheeded, probably because the bishop suspected him of Jansenism owing to his association with Tamburini and the Pavian clergy. He was compelled therefore to walk to Cashel, where he was welcomed by his surviving relatives. After an unsuccessful attempt for an appointment to a parish in his home diocese, he wandered on to Dublin, where he was taken in as an assistant priest at the old Francis Street Chapel, by the vicar-general, Father Hamil, a fellow student of his Roman days. Soon afterwards he was appointed professor of Scripture and Hebrew in Maynooth College on the recommendation of the Archbishops of Armagh and Dublin. Dr. Moylan, however, raised difficulties; he proposed that Lanigan should first sign a formula used to test the Catholicity of the numerous French clergy who were taking refuge in Ireland at that time. Lanigan, seeing no justification for this proposal, refused and resigned.

Through the influence of Charles Vallancey, Lanigan found work as a sub-editor at the Royal Dublin Society, translating, cataloguing, and proof-reading. After a few years, he was appointed assistant librarian and began to work on his Ecclesiastical History of Ireland from the first introduction of Christianity among the Irish to the beginning of the thirteenth century, which was not, however, published till 1822 (4 vols., 8vo, Dublin). This work corrected inaccuracies of Mervyn Archdall, Edward Ledwich, Giraldus Cambrensis, and other writers on Irish church history. In it Lanigan supports the theory of the pagan origin of the Irish round towers.

In 1807 he assisted Edward O'Reilly, William Halliday, and Maynooth College Irish Professor Father Paul O'Brien in founding the Gaelic Society of Dublin, the initial effort to save the Irish language. Lanigan was closely associated with the literary enterprises of the time in Dublin. He wrote frequently to the Press in favour of religious equality for Catholics, and fought vigorously against the proposed Royal Veto in connection with Irish episcopal elections. He occasionally contributed article on ecclesiastical history to the Dublin newspapers under the pseudonym "Ireneaus".

In 1813 his health began to fail, and he was granted a leave of absence to return to his home at Cashel, where he was tended by his sisters; he recovered sufficiently to resume his duties in Dublin. Following a nervous breakdown, he entered Dr Harty's Asylum in Finglas, Dublin,. where after some time he became a permanent patient. He was diagnosed with a gradual softening of the brain. Over years in the asylum, his portly figure wasted away and he became emaciated. He was joined at the asylum by his friend and former classmate, Charles O'Conor.

Lanigan died on 7 July 1828, at the age of about seventy, and was buried in the neighbouring churchyard of Finglas Church. Thirty-three years later, in 1861, his literary admirers erected a cross in his memory, bearing an inscription in both Latin and Irish. Many years after his death, his research on the History was finally appreciated.

== Works ==
Besides his writings mentioned above, there are:

- De origine et progressu hermeneuticae sacre (Pavia, 1789)
- Saggio sulla maniera d'insegnare ai giovani ecclesiastici la scienza de' libri sacri (Pavia)
- "The Present State ... of the Church of England and the Means of effecting a Reconciliation of the Churches", prefaced to the "Protestant Apology for the Roman Catholic Church" (Dublin, 1809), by "Christianus" [Wm. Talbot].

He prepared for publication the first edition of the Breviary printed in Ireland, and edited Alban Butler's Meditations and Discourses (which appeared in 1845).
