= Latoon fairy bush =

Fairy bush in County Clare, Ireland

- Interactive map of Latoon fairy bush
- Species: Common hawthorn, also known as whitethorn (Crataegus monogyna)
- Location: Junction 11 of the M18 motorway, Latoon, County Clare, Ireland
- Coordinates: 52.79015°N 8.92128°W
- Custodian: Clare County Council

The Latoon fairy bush, or Latoon fairy tree, is a whitethorn tree situated beside the M18 motorway in Latoon, County Clare, Ireland that was the subject of a preservation campaign led by Irish folklorist Eddie Lenihan in 1999 to save it from being cut down when the motorway was being built. According to Lenihan, the tree is an "important meeting place for supernatural forces of the region".

The campaign purportedly held up the construction of the motorway for 10 years. Lenihan warned that its destruction could have resulted in "death and great misfortune for motorists travelling on the proposed new road". The tree was eventually spared in May 1999, and still grows in situ as of 2026.

== Location ==
The tree is situated on a gently sloping strip of median land between the M18 motorway and a northbound slip road leading onto the motorway, situated in the townland of Latoon South. The section of the M18 motorway beside which the tree grows is colloquially known as either the Newmarket-on-Fergus bypass, or the Ennis bypass, as the two bypasses join into one another in the region of the fairy bush.

== Fairy sites ==
Numerous sites exist with folkloric "fairy" significance in the Irish landscape. According to The New York Times, there are "perhaps 150 fairy-sacred locations in Ireland", some of which are bushes and some called 'fairy forts' (correctly known as ringforts) consisting of the "remains of stone or wooden forts which housed an extended family in early medieval times". Tradition dictates that they should never be moved or harmed, as Lenihan recounts:

"If you move or destroy a fairy fort or Celtic ringfort, you'll be in trouble and you're creating trouble. Never shift a fairy bush. It belongs where it is and nowhere else".

Lenihan, one of Ireland's best known folklorists and story-tellers (seanchaí), describes a 'fairy bush' as being "a favourite meeting place for supernatural folk, dating back to the mist of pre-Celtic history". According to the 2013 publication Heritage Trees of Ireland, Ireland hosts more sacred trees than any other country in Europe.

== History ==
The Latoon fairy bush was known to Lenihan prior to the planned construction of the road, owing to a local farmer who had once pointed it out to him, as he had previously seen "white fairy blood" on the grass around the base of the tree. On another occasion, a farmer had told him how he once saw "lumps of green stuff with the consistency of liver" around the tree, indicating "that there had been fairy battles around the bush the night before." Lenihan recognised the tree as a fairy bush, and concluded that it must have been "significant for them (as) a meeting point for Munster fairies to battle with Connaught fairies".

According to a 2019 article on TheJournal.ie, Lenihan, then a 49-year-old secondary school teacher (in 1999), was subsequently "passing the bush one evening on the way home from teaching in Limerick when he saw machinery and road workers beside it". "I knew nothing about the road being built, and asked them what would happen to the bush," he said. After being informed that the bush would be destroyed, Lenihan decided that he had to fight for its preservation, and wrote to the Clare Champion and Clare FM radio station warning of the possible consequences that its removal would bring.

Lenihan subsequently wrote a letter which was published in The Irish Times and picked up by a New York Times correspondent. The piece in the New York Times, dated 16 June 1999, noted that the engineer in charge of the bypass had been warned of the possible effects that could transpire if the 15-foot-high bush were to be moved or destroyed and had confirmed that he would "think it over".

The author of the New York Times article got in touch with the Folklore department at University College Dublin who agreed with Lenihan's sentiment that "while the people of modern Ireland scoff publicly at fairy stories, ashamed to admit their beliefs and superstitions to strangers, there is still strong vestigial belief in the fairies". Bairbre Ní Fhloinn, an archivist and fairy story collector at the same department added:

"It's a passive belief, and it includes a lot of young, well-educated people. There is a reluctance to interfere in things which have an association with the fairies or with the other world. We would all rather be safe than sorry".

Including the piece in the New York Times, the story was also picked up by the BBC, CNN, French and Swedish news channels. As Lenihan contends "By that stage, they couldn’t demolish the bush."

In an Irish Times article dated 29 May 1999, it was noted that "during the last couple of months", Clare County Council had been carrying out archaeological works on the lands surrounding the bush as part of preparatory works for the bypass. The bush, however, had remained untouched, in deference to Lenihan's campaign. The previous day, the county engineer Tom Carey had confirmed to the Irish Times that "after surveying the fairy thorn bush in the detailed plans and drawings prepared, the council has found that it would now be able to incorporate the "sceach" (fairy bush) into the proposed bypass". A protective fence was subsequently constructed around the fairy tree.

Lenihan was reportedly "very glad" with the result, but was also disappointed at being unable to stop the council from clearing trees at a nearby ringfort as part of the same bypass plans. A number of accidents subsequently befell the workers who cut down those trees.

In March 2014, Irish author Manchán Magan wrote a newspaper column on the subject of fairies in which he contacted the National Roads Authority with a request for information regarding the organisation's policy on disturbing these sites, which had come into question during the construction of the N3 motorway near the ancient ceremonial site of the Hill of Tara from 2007 to 2010.

In the article, Magan also referred to the "fairy controversy" that had occurred with the Latoon fairy bush in 1999, in which "the €90 million road scheme" had to be rerouted to bypass the tree. Magan noted that Lenihan had tried to bring the issue to court at the time, and when contacted for a statement, Jeanne McDonagh, spokeswoman for the Bar Council of Ireland, clarified that "With a membership of more than 2,300 barristers, the Bar Council had difficulty getting consensus as to the existence of fairies".

Four days after the publication of Magan's article, Tom Carey, former county engineer for County Clare from 1996 to 2008, wrote in to the letters page of The Irish Times to confirm that the motorway had categorically not been "rerouted to avoid the "sgeach" or fairy bush". During his tenure, Carey had overseen the construction of the M18 motorway, and confirmed to readers:

"...when the controversy arose, nobody knew the precise co-ordinates of the bush, except that it was fairly close to the carriageway under construction. When its precise co-ordinates were determined, it was found that the bush occupied a spot which lay between the main carriageway and the northbound slip road at the Latoon interchange, so we fenced it in and it did not interfere with construction works".

Carey confirmed that "later attempts to vandalise (the tree) in 2002 by unknowns with a chainsaw did not succeed, thankfully, and it co-exists today with the motorway". As of 2024, the bush still stands along the bypass, and owing to its previous worldwide coverage, and folkloric significance, has led to it becoming somewhat of a tourist attraction in the region.

As of 2021, Magan still contended that the National Roads Authority diverted the motorway around the bush on purpose, judging from the overpass where "you can see how the route kinks slightly to the east to avoid" the bush, which stands "proudly between the northbound lane of the motorway and the on-ramp on the western side." Lenihan himself mentioned in a 2009 interview that the NRA "were forced to bend the road a little bit around the bush, which they did, which is fine. There was no need to demolish the bush at all. Just adjust the road a little bit and landscape the bush into the roadway".

== See also ==
- List of individual trees
- A similar case in Annacloy, Northern Ireland in 1964 in which the existence of a "fairy thorn" delayed the construction of a road
- A fairy tree in Ardagh, County Longford that gained national attention in 1983 when it was featured on an episode of The Live Mike presented by Mike Murphy. The owner of the land on which the tree grew, Jim Sweeney, was convinced that if the tree were to fall over, he would have "less than one week to live".
- A fairy tree in 1969 in Ballintra, County Donegal that was due to be cut down to facilitate road widening until local outcry forced the council to reroute the road
- A fairy tree was reputedly cut down during the construction of the DeLorean Motor Company factory in Dunmurry, Belfast, whose failure just two years later was attributed by some to the cutting of the tree
- St Kieran's Bush, a 'rag tree' named after the fifth century Ciarán of Saigir in Clareen, County Offaly was saved from destruction as part of a road widening scheme after local people objected
- Fairy Bridge on the Isle of Man, a small bridge with the tradition that passers-by must greet the fairies as they cross it, or they will suffer bad luck

== Sources ==
- Fennell, Aubrey (2013). Heritage Trees of Ireland. Wilton, Cork: The Collins Press. ISBN 978-1-84889-159-3.
- S. Gentile, John; Lenihan, Edmund (1 September 2009). "Stories of the Otherworld: An Interview with Eddie Lenihan". Storytelling, Self, Society. 5. Detroit: Wayne State University Press: 152–175. JSTOR 41949029.
