= R351 road =

R351 road may refer to:

- R351 road (Ireland)
- R351 road (South Africa)
