= M18 motorway (Ireland) =

Motorway linking Shannon and the Galway area

M18 motorway
- Mótarbhealach M18
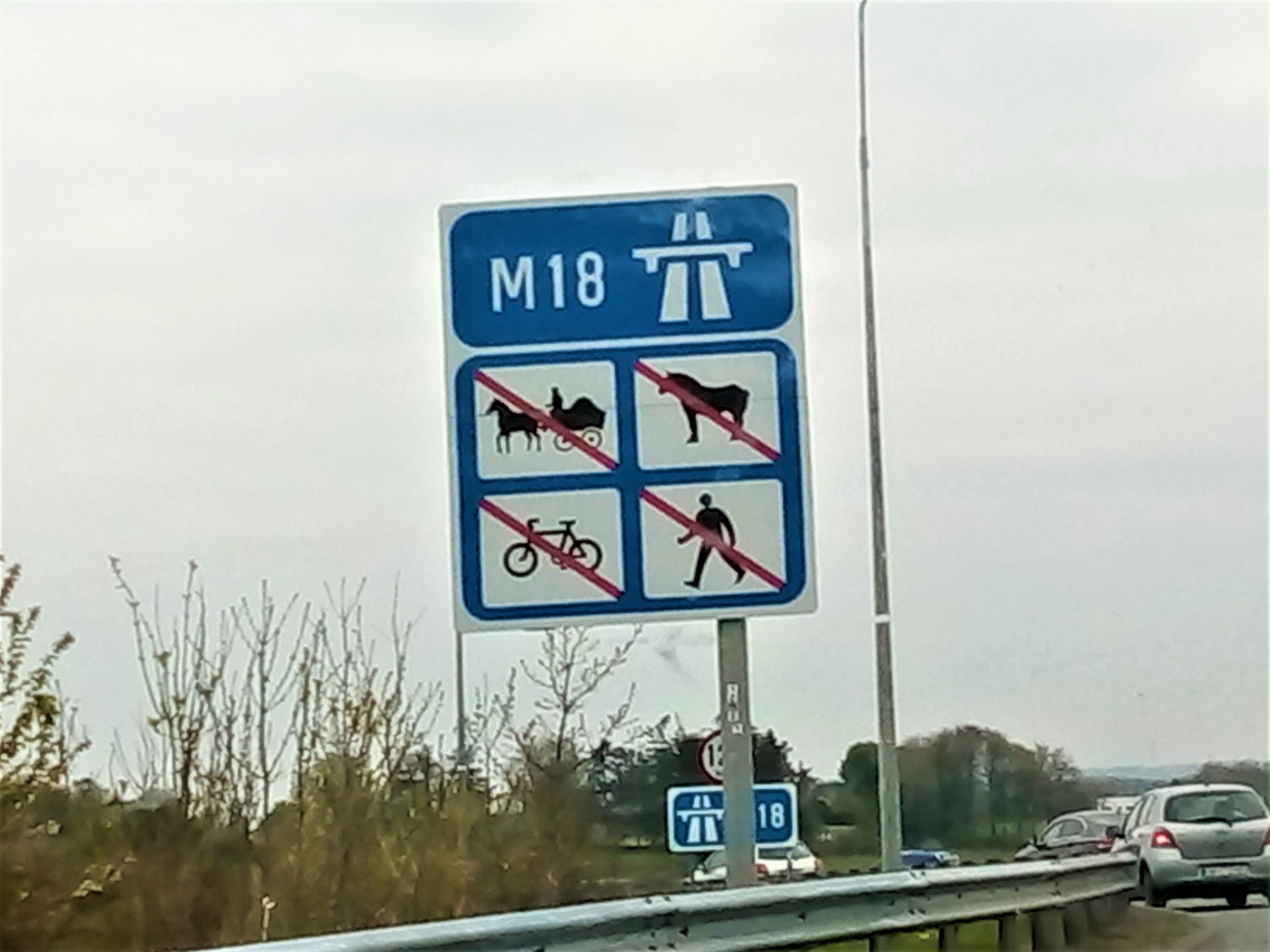

Route information
- Length: 70.8 km (44.0 mi)
- Existed: 26 January 2007–present
- History: Completed on 27 September 2017

Major junctions
- From: Shannon
- J9 → N19 road J12 → N85 road J18 → M6 motorway, M17 motorway
- To: Junction 18 terminus, east of Galway.

Location
- Country: Ireland
- Primary destinations: Ennis, Shannon, Gort

Highway system
- Roads in Ireland; Motorways; Primary; Secondary; Regional

The M18 motorway (Irish: Mótarbhealach M18) is an inter-urban motorway in Ireland, forming part of the Limerick, Ennis to Galway national primary road, which, in turn, forms part of the Atlantic Corridor called for as part of the Transport 21 project.

== Route ==
The motorway starts at junction 9 on the Shannon bypass and heads in a northerly direction where it bypasses the town of Newmarket-on-Fergus via the townlands of Killulla, Knocksaggart and Ballyconneely. After Newmarket-on-Fergus, the motorway runs alongside Dromoland, where significant historical features can be seen from the mainline.

As the route progresses further north, it develops into the Ennis Bypass. The median was constructed with an H2 concrete barrier rather than the wide grassy median seen in the earlier stretch to the south, and it features a lower noise-wearing course. Bypassing traffic bottlenecks at Ennis and Clarecastle, this section was completed in 2007 and it significantly reduced travel times between Galway, Ennis, and Limerick.

A 22 km bypass for Crusheen village and Gort, was opened in November 2010. The motorway then ends at junction 18 of the M6, following its completion in September 2017. The road continues northbound as the M17 towards Tuam.

== History ==
- Ennis Bypass (January 2007, as dual carriageway, redesignated as a Motorway)
- Newmarket-on-Fergus Bypass (December 2002, as dual carriageway)
- Crusheen to Gort (November 2010, Motorway)
- Gort to M6/M17 Junction 18 (September 2017, Motorway)

=== Ennis Bypass ===
The 14-kilometre (8.7 mi) Ennis Bypass opened to traffic as a standard dual carriageway section of the N18 on 26 January 2007, after a construction period of almost three years. It was redesignated as a Motorway on 28 August 2009 In addition to Ennis, the road also bypasses the village of Clarecastle. The scheme was built by Gama Strabeg JV.

=== Newmarket-on-Fergus Bypass ===
The Newmarket-on-Fergus Bypass opened as a 5.7 km (3.5 mi) dual carriageway on 30 September 2002, routing around the town of Newmarket-on-Fergus. The scheme alleviated one of the worst congestion black spots in the country. It includes two grade separated junctions at Carrigoran and Dromoland. It was redesignated as a motorway on 28 August 2009.

The construction of this section of the motorway gained international attention in 1999 as a result of the Latoon fairy bush, a tree of supernatural significance which folklorist Eddie Lenihan demanded must be saved as it was in the path of the intended route. The tree was eventually spared, and still grows onsite as of 2024.

=== Ennis (Crusheen) to Gort ===
Construction of a 22 km (14 mi) section of the M18 between Crusheen and Gort commenced in October 2008 and was opened to traffic on 12 November 2010. This scheme, known as 'Gort to Crusheen', connects to the northern end of the Ennis bypass and provides a continuous motorway just north of Gort in County Galway. The scheme was built by SIAC Wills JV.

=== Gort to Claregalway ===
The Gort to Tuam (M18/M17) route is 58 km (36 mi.) long. The project involved the construction of a motorway from Gort to Athenry, extending in the process the total length of the M18 by 27 km (17 mi). It connects to the M17 Motorway where they cross the Dublin to Galway M6 motorway, which opened in December 2009. This was also included in the second tranche of motorway redesignations and was opened as a motorway. In April 2014, it was confirmed that it would proceed. Work on the project began on 15 January 2015 and was managed by Direct Route. It was officially opened on 27 September 2017.

=== Motorway redesignations affecting the M18 ===
Initially, none of the proposed dual carriageway between Limerick and Galway outlined in the Transport 21 programme was to operate under motorway restrictions. However, the National Roads Authority (NRA) decided late in 2008 to include all sections of grade separated N18 – whether built, under construction, or still at the planning stage – in its second tranche of motorway redesignation proposals. These were approved by the Minister for Transport in July 2009, and the changes came into effect on 28 August 2009.

== Junctions ==
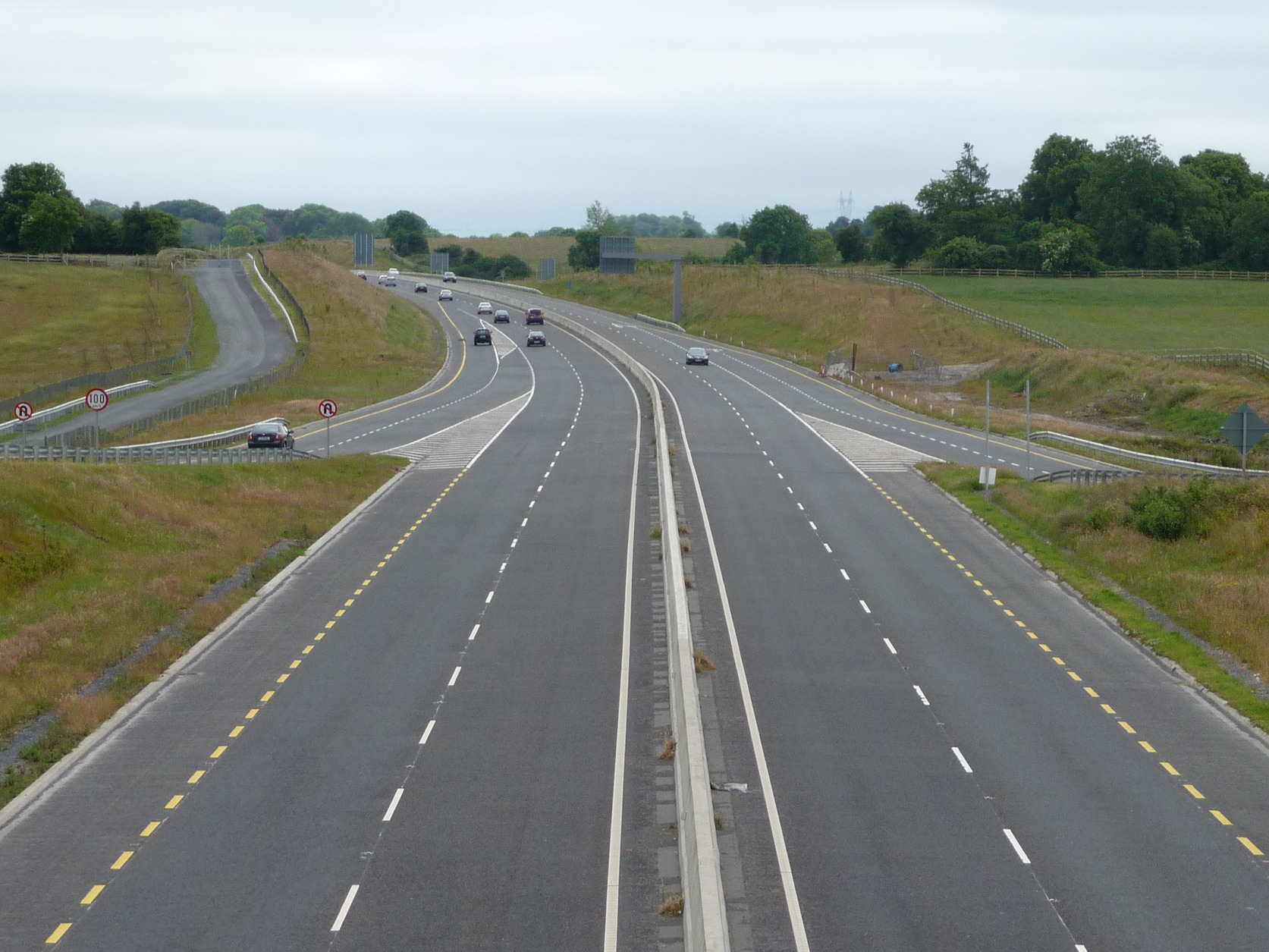
A section of the Ennis Bypass before the motorway changeover.

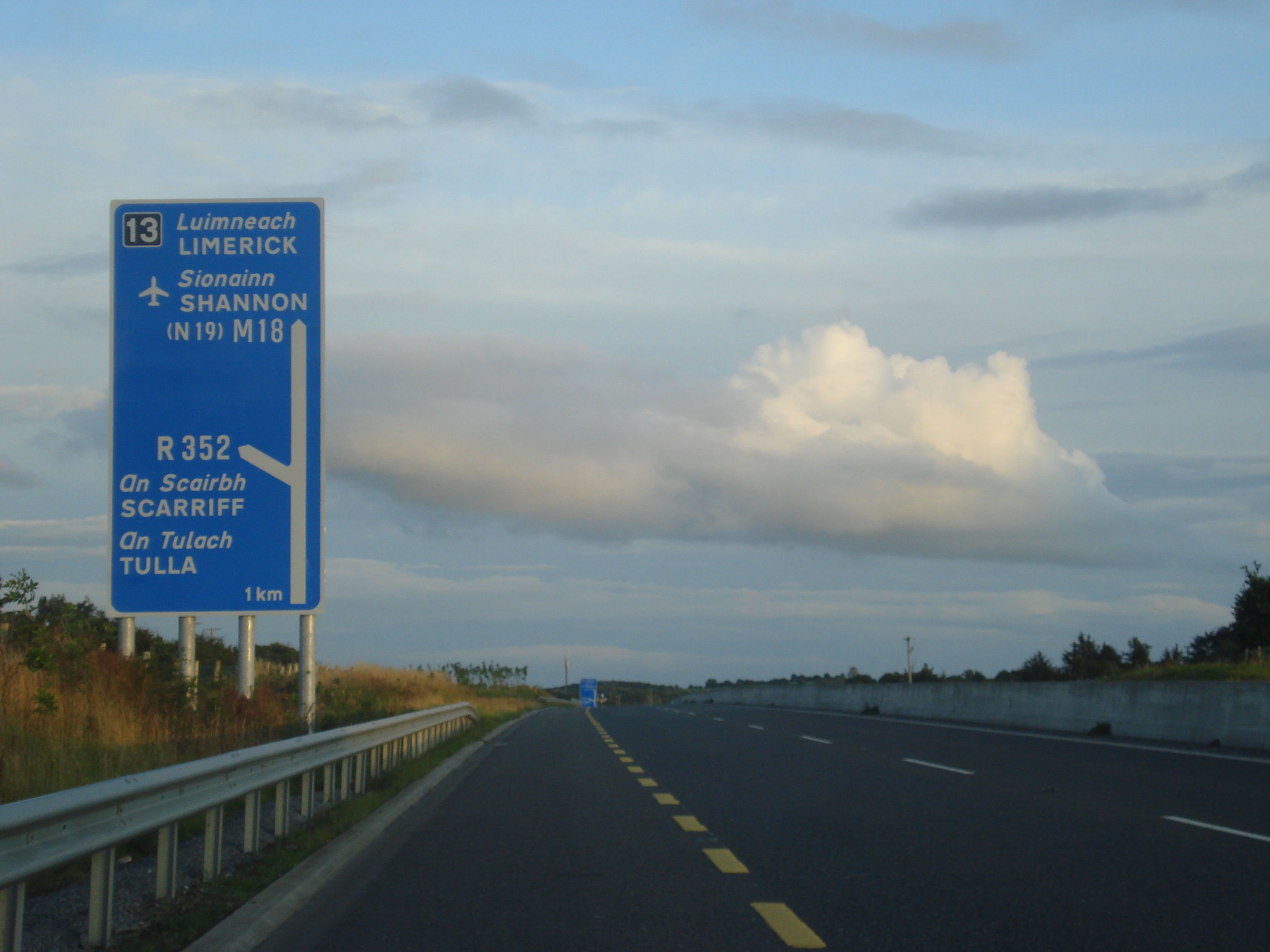
M18 southbound J13 1 km ADS Signage taken before redesignation on the Ennis bypass

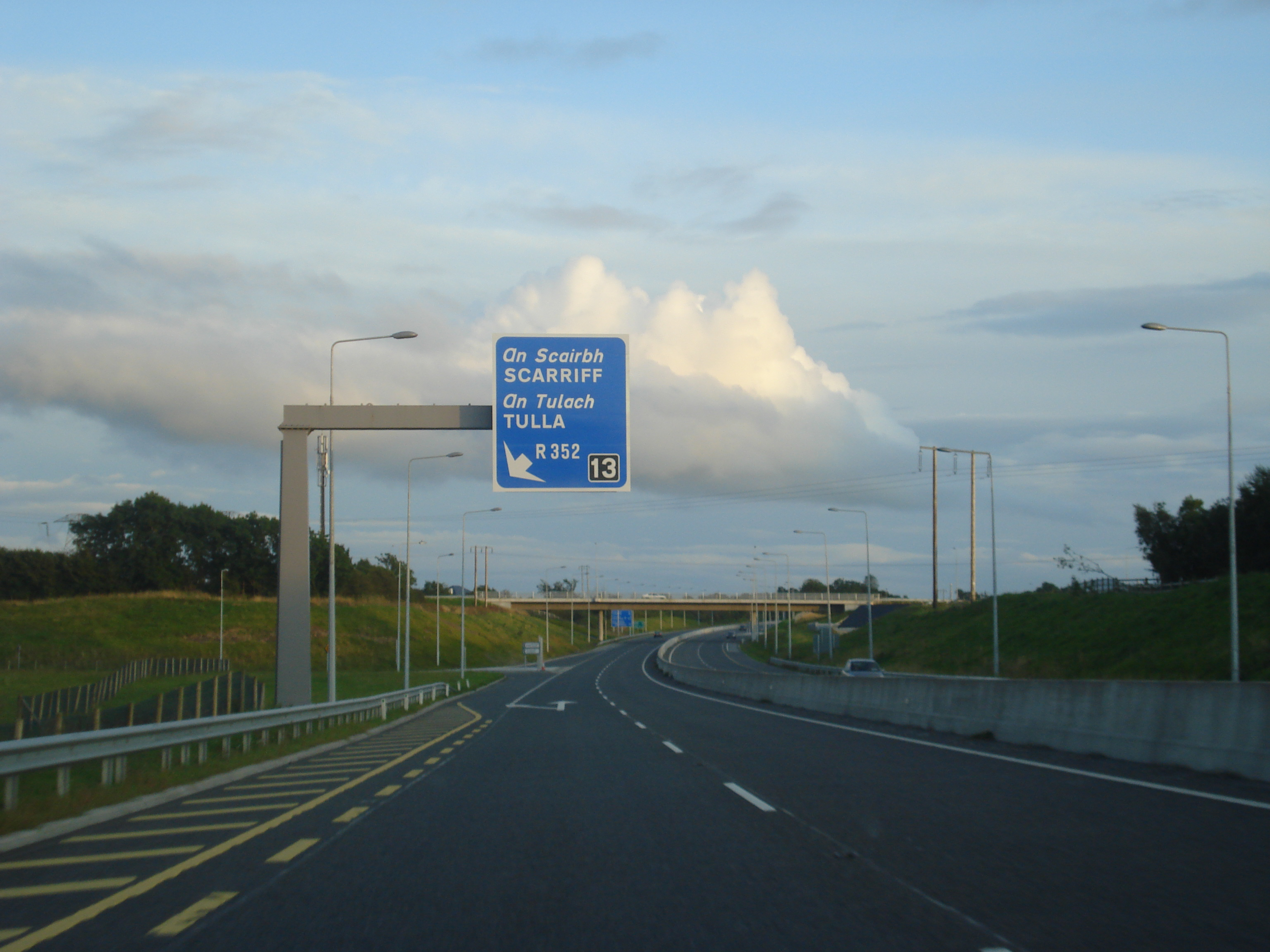
This taken on the Ennis bypass section junction 13 southbound and gantry for junction 13

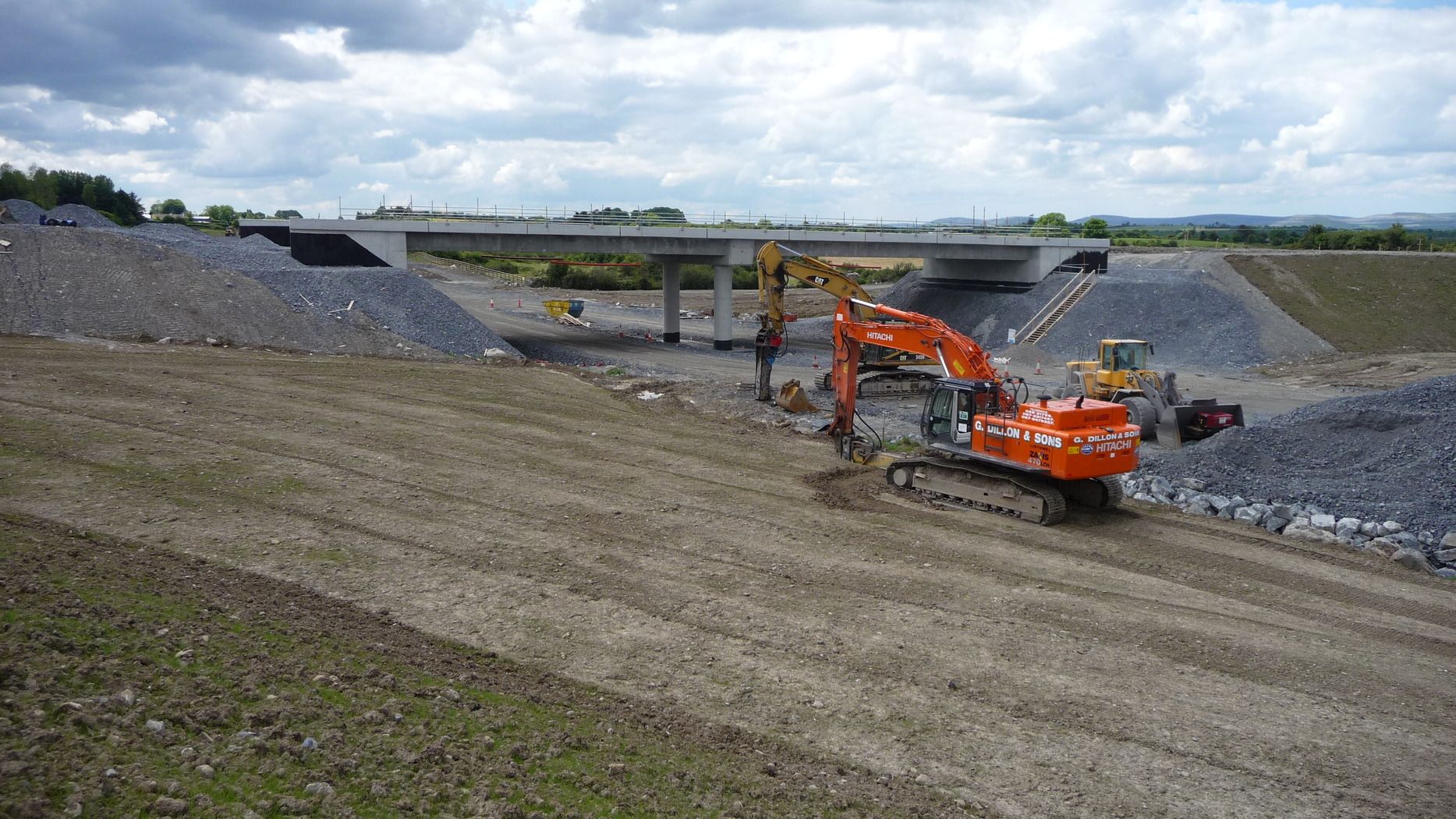
Gort-Crusheen under construction (June 2009): The grade-separated junction at Gort.

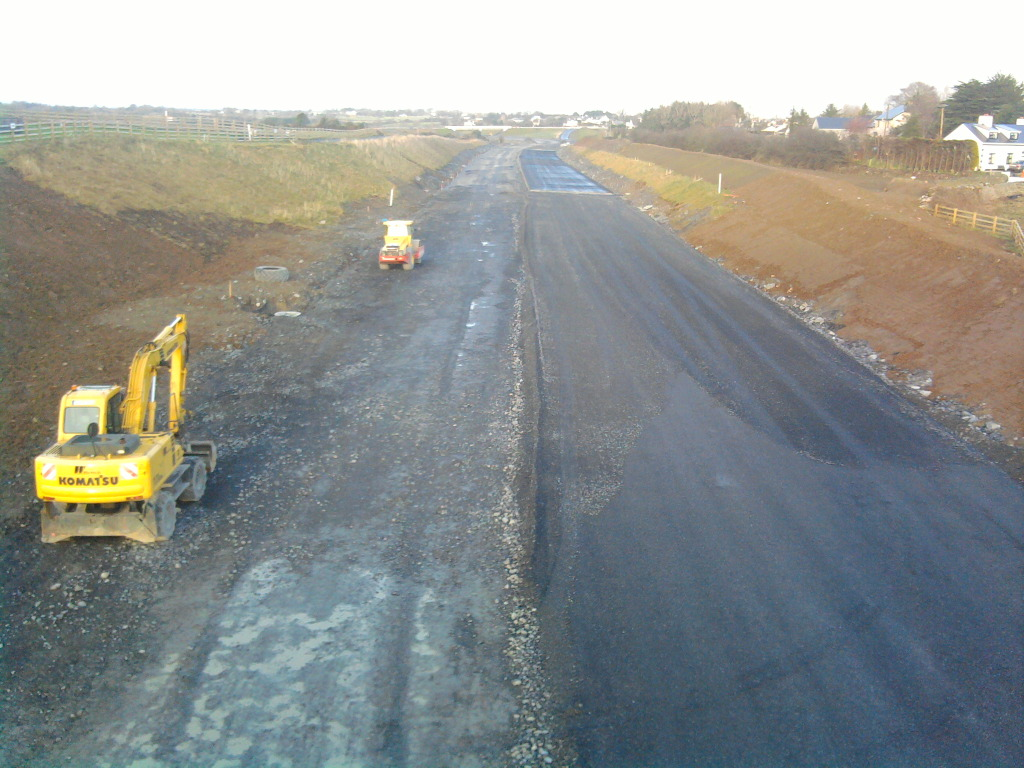
CBM being laid down on the mainline of the Gort to Crusheen scheme looking north from the R460 overbridge

Junctions 1-9 form part of the N18 dual carriageway.

County	km	mi	Junction	Destinations	Notes
County Clare			9	N19 ‒ Shannon Town, Shannon Airport	Continues as N18 dual carriageway.
County Clare			10	R401 ‒ Newmarket-on-Fergus, Carrigoran	
County Clare			11	R458 ‒ Quin, Dromoland, Ballygirreen	
County Clare			12	N85 ‒ Ennis, Ennistimon, Kilrush	
County Clare			13	R352 ‒ Scariff, Tulla	LILO junction.
County Clare			14	R458 ‒ Ennis, Barefield	LILO junction.
County Clare			15	R458 ‒ Crusheen	
County Galway			16	R458 ‒ Loughrea, Gort	Partial LILO junction. Scarriff and Tulla shown heading northbound.
County Galway			17	R458 ‒ Ardrahan, Kinvarra	LILO junction. Oranmore shown heading northbound.
County Galway			18	M6 – Dublin, Galway	Continues as M17 motorway.
1.000 mi = 1.609 km; 1.000 km = 0.621 mi: Route transition
