= Church of St. John, Cratloe =

Catholic church in County Clare, Ireland

Coordinates: 52°41′52.9″N 8°45′19.76″W

The Church of St. John, is the Roman Catholic parish church of Cratloe, in County Clare, Ireland. It was originally built in 1791 by Fr. James Ward, the parish priest at that time. Two transepts having been added to the original chancel and nave in 1806, by Fr. Jeremiah Cronin. The doorway to the right transept is a medieval doorway, believed to have come from one of the earlier churches of Kilfintenan or Craughaun in the parish. It is one of only three remaining 'barn' churches in Ireland built during penal times, a time when Roman Catholics were not allowed practice their religion. In 1828 Daniel O'Connell, an MP for County Clare who would later go on to be known as The Liberator, made a speech outside the church about the Catholic Emancipation Act, arguing that Catholic Members of Parliament should be allowed take their seat once elected, which was forbidden at that time.
The quaint country church is popular for weddings, and a number of celebrity weddings have been held here, including that of Sharon Corr, of the musical group The Corrs.

== Cratloe Grotto ==
A short distance away is Cratloe Grotto, which is maintained by the parish. Work on the Cratloe Grotto began in 1928 and was opened in 1932 after the initiative of Fr. John Wallace, P.P. The 100 foot climb up to the Grotto itself includes the Stations of the Cross on either side of the path. The grotto was designed as a replica of the grotto at Lourdes. On the hill above the grotto is a statue of the scene of the Crucifixion of Christ. The grotto also contains a number of religious statues. The work on constructing the grotto was carried out voluntarily by the people of the parish.
