= Crusheen railway station =

Former railway station in Ireland

Coordinates: 52°56′19″N 8°54′05″W

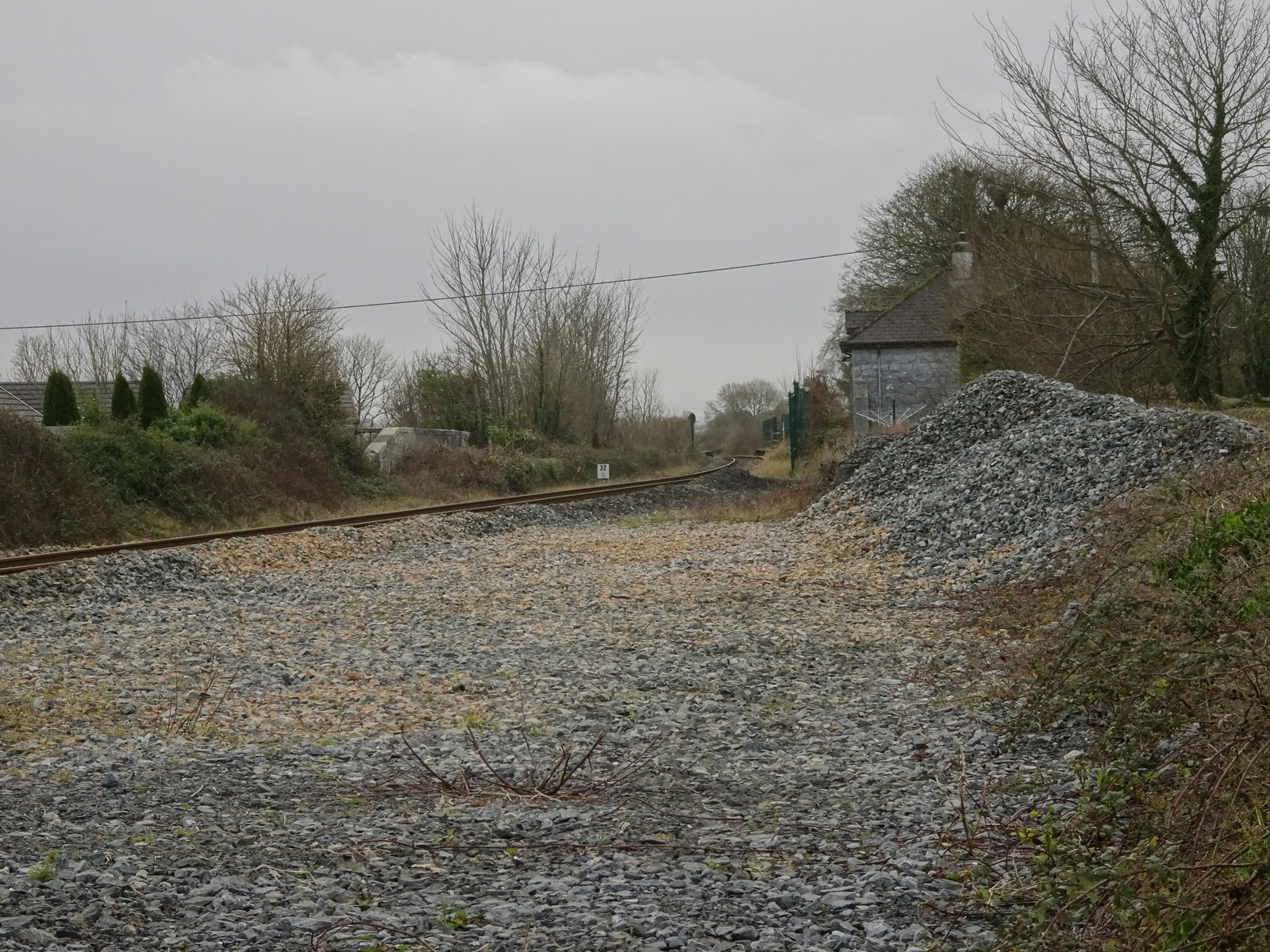
Site of Crusheen's former railway station

Crusheen railway station is a closed railway station in the village of Crusheen, County Clare in Ireland. The station, which was originally built in the 1860s, was closed in 1976 for passenger traffic and in the 1990s for freight traffic.

In 2011, planning permission was granted to Iarnród Éireann for the construction of a new station on the proposed Western Railway Corridor. However, the proposed project was "not provided for" in Iarnród Éireann's 2013 budget, and by late 2019, the company's CEO said that there was no funding and "no provision for a station" at Crusheen.
