= Tulla =

Town in County Clare, Ireland

Tulla An Tulach (Irish)
- Town
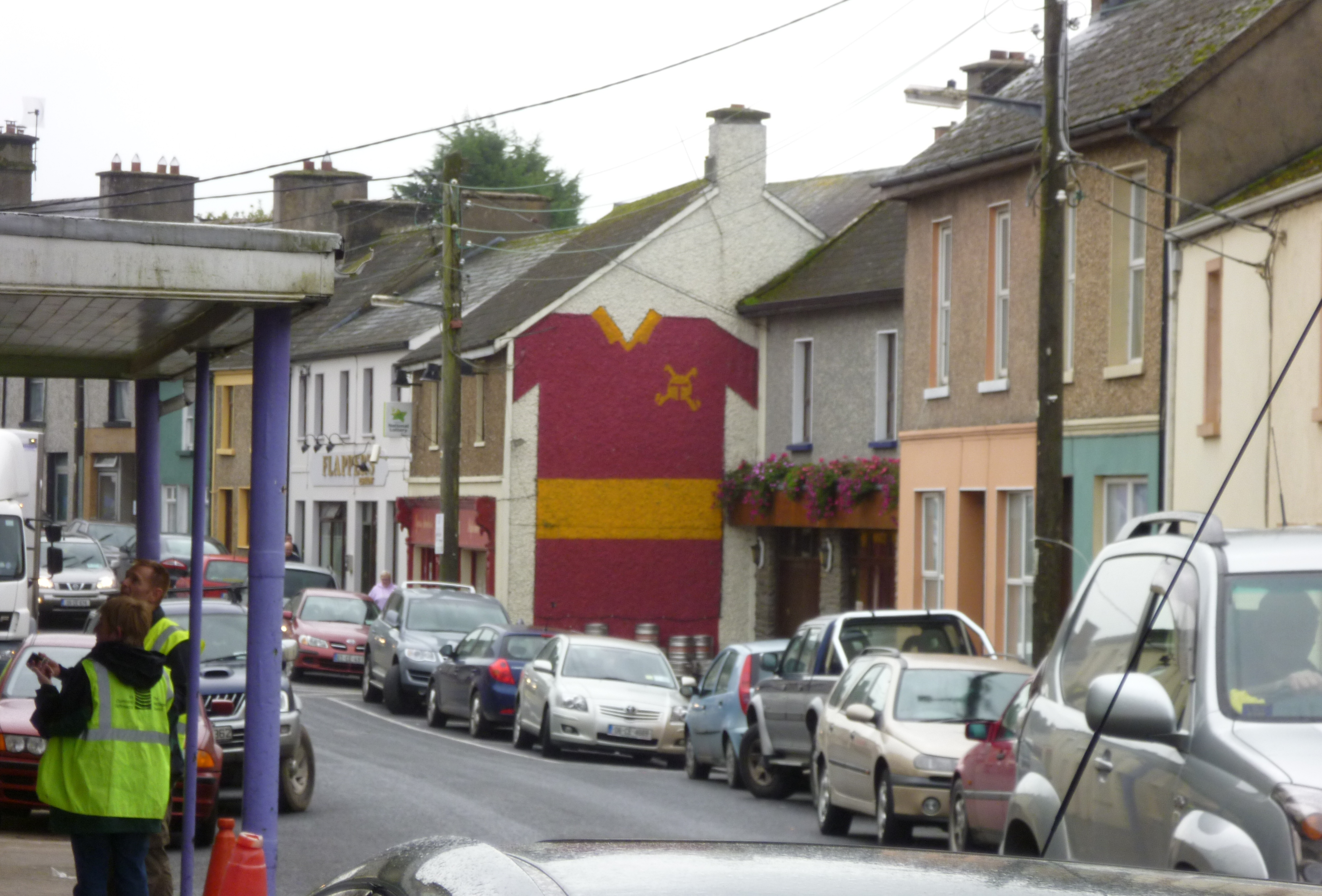
- Street scene in Tulla

- Location in Ireland
- Coordinates: 52°52′03″N 8°45′37″W
- Country: Ireland
- Province: Munster
- County: County Clare

Population (2022)
  - Total: 697
- Irish Grid Reference: R484798

Tulla (Irish: An Tulach, meaning 'the hillock') is a market town in County Clare, Ireland. It is situated in the east of the county, on the R462 and near its junction with the R352, 18 km from Ennis. The town is in a townland and civil parish of the same name.

== Etymology ==
Tulla is generally translated as An Tulach, meaning "round hill". However, the full name is either Tulach na nAspal, meaning "hill of the apostles", or Tulach na nEaspag, meaning "hill of the bishops".

== History ==
The village of Tulla grew up around a monastery founded about 620 by Mochulla, who later became its patron saint.

The town received its town charter in the 13th century, and its market patent in 1619, resulting in market days being held throughout the year.

The town was described by Samuel Lewis in 1837 as appearing "to have some claims to antiquity; there are numerous remains of ancient castles, formerly the residences of its landed proprietors. The town is pleasantly situated on a hill, and is surrounded with highly interesting scenery, enlivened with numerous elegant seats and pleasing villas. The principal trade is derived from its situation on a public thoroughfare, and is chiefly confined to the supply of the surrounding neighbourhood."

While the advent of modern transportation and the opening of larger marts in Ennis and Scarriff meant the last fair took place in 1972, diminishing Tulla's role as a trading centre, it is still a busy town and the commercial centre of the surrounding area. The town continues to hold a market licence, where traders sell their goods in front of the courthouse every Thursday morning.

== Demographics ==
In 1845, the population of the Tulla parish was estimated at 9,000. However, the Great Famine forced mass emigration, and by 1851 the population had decreased to roughly 6,700. As of 2022, the population of Tulla was 697.

== Facilities ==
Tulla is the commercial centre for the eponymous parish and its catchment area, with a butcher shop, a community centre, a hardware store, a library, a pharmacy, a post office, a SuperValu supermarket, a number of public houses and restaurants, and a cultural centre.

It was announced on 1 March 2021 that the town's Bank of Ireland branch would be closing in September, creating significant concern about the sustainability of the town.

== Religion ==
A new Catholic church, dedicated to Saints Peter & Paul, was opened in 1829. There are also churches dedicated to St James in Knockjames and the Immaculate Conception in Drumcharley.

== Sport ==
Founded in 1885, Tulla GAA is the oldest GAA club in County Clare. Their grounds, Páirc an Dálaigh, is named after the famous goalkeeper, Tommy Daly.

There is also an association football club in the town, Tulla United, which was founded in 1970 and plays its home games at The Cragg.

== Music ==
Tulla is also notable for its eponymous céilí band, as well as the famous St Patrick's Pipe Band, known locally as Tulla Pipe Band, which was formed on 7 January 1936.

== Education ==
There is one primary school in the town, St Mochulla's National School, and one secondary school, St Joseph's Secondary School, which was founded in 1950.

== Notable persons and institutions ==
- Jack Coughlan – hurler
- David McInerney – hurler
- Ger Nash – Bishop of Ferns, born in Glandree
- Theophilus O'Flanagan – Gaelic scholar; co-founder and first secretary of the Gaelic Society of Dublin
- Tulla Céilí Band – céilí band active since 1946

== See also ==
- List of towns and villages in Ireland
- List of Irish towns with a market house
