= R466 road (Ireland) =

Road in Ireland

R466 road
- Bóthar R466
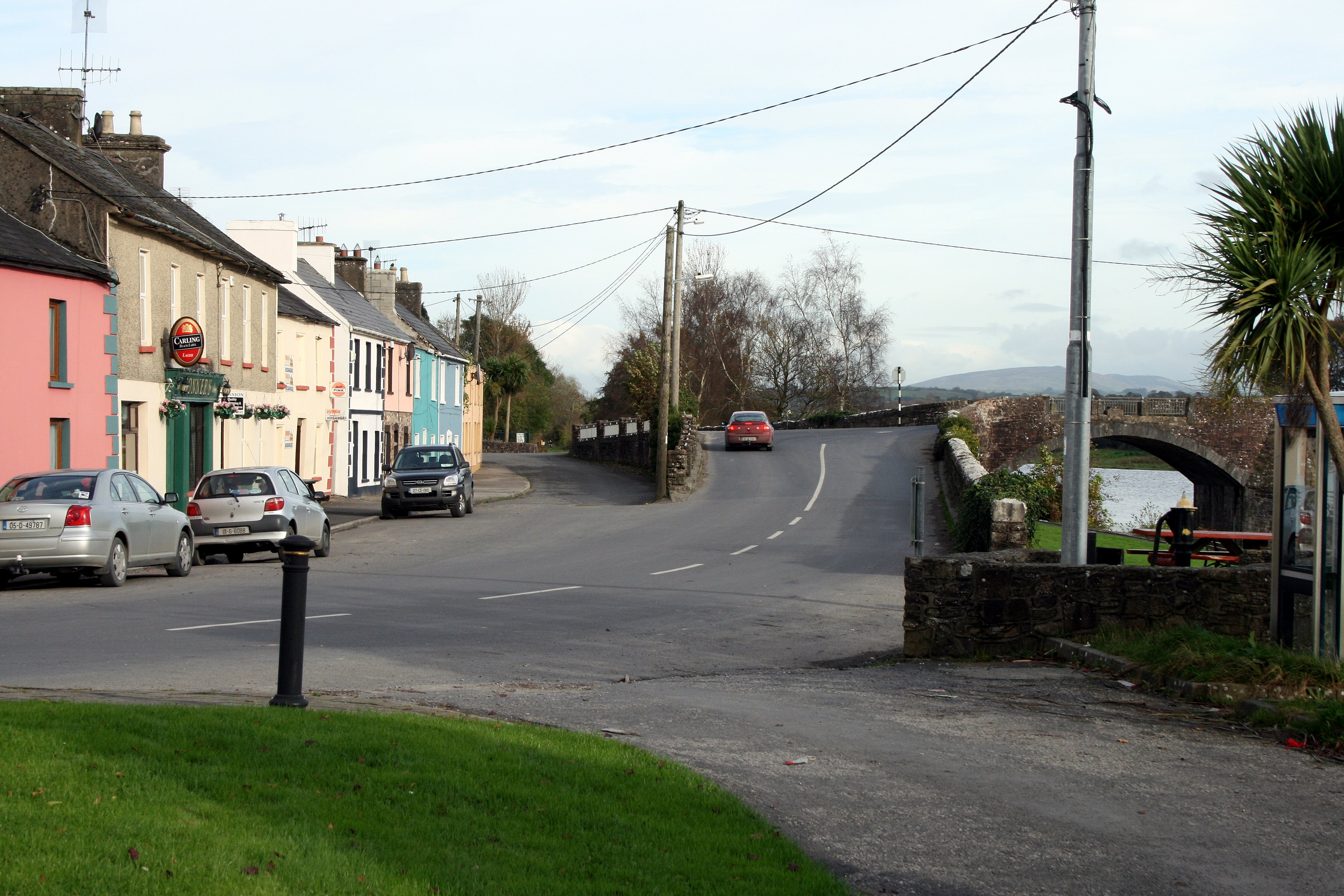
- R466 in O'Briensbridge

Route information
- Length: 32 km (20 mi)

Location
- Country: Ireland
- Primary destinations: County Tipperary; Leaves the R445 at Birdhill; County Limerick; Montpelier – (R525); Crosses the River Shannon; County Clare; O'Briensbridge – (R463); Bridgetown; Broadford – (R465); (R467); O'Callaghans Mills; Terminates at the R352

Highway system
- Roads in Ireland; Motorways; Primary; Secondary; Regional

The R466 road is a regional road in Ireland which runs southeast-northwest from the R445 at Birdhill, County Tipperary to the R352 in East Clare.

After leaving the R445 at Birdhill it passes through Montpelier before crossing the River Shannon at O'Briensbridge in County Clare via a narrow 14-arch bridge. It veers northwest for the rest of the route, passing through Broadford and O'Callaghans Mills before terminating at a junction with the R352.

The route is 32 km (20 mi) long.

== See also ==
- Roads in Ireland
- National primary road
- National secondary road
