= Cratloe Woods =

Forested area in County Clare, Ireland

Coordinates: 52°42′10.69″N 8°44′48.08″W

Cratloe Woods is a forested area around the village of Cratloe in County Clare, Ireland. Much of the original oak forest has been replaced with coniferous softwoods during the past century; however, small pockets of native oak survive. The largest such pocket is the Garranon (or Garranone) Wood, which is visible on the hillside just north of the N18 road from Limerick to Shannon.

== In literature ==
The woods at Cratloe Hill are the subject of poems and stories going back to at least the seventeenth century. Notable writers who have mentioned the site include Elizabeth Bowen, who used the woodland at Garranone to symbolise the continuity of the Irish landscape and Samuel Ferguson, whose love poem "The Lapful of Nuts" describes his happy times in Cratloe collecting nuts with his sweetheart. This poem dates to at least the mid-19th century.

== Traditional tales ==
Local tradition claims that a highwayman hid his treasure under a tree in the woods, and an oblique reference to this (or to a contemporary villain) is in The Midnight Court by Brian Merriman. Some veracity is given to this tale by the hanging of an alleged criminal in Ennis around this time. The outlaw is described as a cross between Ned Kelly and Robin Hood; the tradition maintains that he buried his takings under "a tree marked with the Ace of Spades". The roof beams of the Palace of Westminster in London and the Royal Palace in Amsterdam are said to have been made from ancient oaks felled when Cratloe Woods were cleared.

Traditionally, it is claimed that wood from the forest was used in St. Mary's Cathedral in Limerick. The church has its original roof, constructed with Irish oak and with a set of carved misericords—one of the few remaining in Ireland dating from before the 16th century. Sources for the history of the site are given in an unpublished doctoral thesis at Trinity College Dublin. The woods are described as Foruisbh in medieval manuscripts, and the site of the O'Brien hunting grounds. They have been well known across Ireland since the Middle Ages.

== Garranon ==
The Garranon (or Garranone) Wood is an area of native Irish species within Cratloe Woods. The Garranon area is predominantly native oak and efforts have been made in to cull introduced species (such as Spanish chestnut) from the wood. Palynological research at the site indicates that woodland has covered the spot since at least the late Middle Ages. Ownership has been by the McNamaras or the O'Briens for the past 1,000 years. The oak in this wood was highly valued and, in 1215 when Geoffrey de Luterel the granted owner of the woods and the townland of Cratloe, sold oak trees to Philip Marc for 20 ounces of gold, a significant sum considering he bought the area for only 30 ounces of silver.

The Garranone site was managed as an oak (Quercus petraea) coppice since at least the 16th century. In the mid-19th century, the wood was converted from coppice to free-standing trees (employing continental techniques) when Scots pine (Pinus sylvestris) was planted between the coppices. Each coppice was singled to one bole and these were forced upwards by the quick-growing pines. Also included with the pines are a number of sweet chestnuts and other trees. The original management to convert the coppice would have involved cutting down the non-native trees once the oak were sizable and growing straight upwards. However, this was done in a desultory way, and many pines and other trees survive. This management was revealed by palynological study, and supported by a forester's handbook now in the keeping of the National Library of Ireland.

== Mapping ==
Maps of the site dates from at least the surveys of the 1680s, when the wood was first indicated in Petty maps. Scientifically, if a woods can be shown to continuously exist from the late Middle Ages (1600 AD in England, later changed to 1700 AD by Oliver Rackham for Scotland and Ireland), it is classified as an ancient wood. Historical records indicate the wood as present since at least 700 AD, cartographic records show the wood present from 1680 AD and palynological records from before 1600 AD.
