= R465 road (Ireland) =

Road in Ireland

Coordinates: 52.729719°N 8.601724°W

R465 road
- Bóthar R465
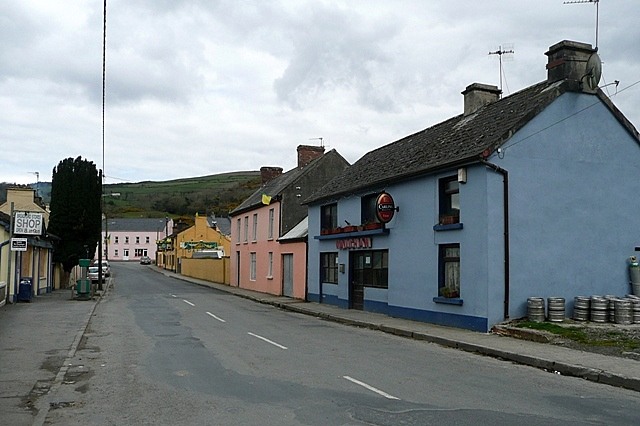
- Broadford Main Street, part of the R465.

Route information
- Length: 23.2 km (14.4 mi)

Major junctions
- From: R352 Bodyke
- Crosses Ballymacdonnell River; Passes through Doon Lough Natural Heritage Area; R466 Broadford; Crosses Glenomra River; R471 Agharinaghbeg; Crosses Munster Blackwater
- To: R463 Ardnacrusha

Location
- Country: Ireland

Highway system
- Roads in Ireland; Motorways; Primary; Secondary; Regional

The R465 road, also called the Broadford Road, is a regional road in Ireland, located in County Clare.
