= Atlantic Corridor =

Proposed road project in Ireland

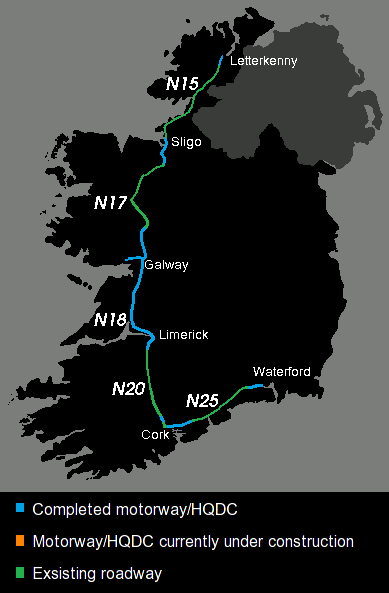
Atlantic Corridor development progress, as of late 2017

The Atlantic corridor or Atlantic motorway is a proposed road project in Ireland. The scheme, announced in 2005, was intended to link Waterford in the South-East to Letterkenny in the North-West via motorway or dual carriageway by 2015. However, in part due to the post-2008 Irish economic downturn, major sections of the roadway were delayed or cancelled.

The Atlantic Corridor, when combined with the inter-urban motorways linking Dublin and the other cities, is intended to ring the island of Ireland and to connect primary population centres.

== National primary roads ==
The constituent national primary routes, included in the 2007 plan, included:

- N15 linking Letterkenny and Sligo
- N17 linking Sligo and Galway
- N18 linking Galway, Ennis and Limerick (including the Limerick Tunnel project)
- N20 linking Limerick and Cork
- N25 linking Cork and Waterford

== Progress ==
As of 2018, over 100 km (62 mi) of the route was completed motorway or dual carriageway. At that time, the next construction planned was the M20 from Cork to Limerick, which was allocated €850 million in government funds under the National Development Plan 2018-2027 capital scheme. The M20, which was "progressed through planning and design phases" as of 2010, is proposed to link with the planned Cork northern ring road, also forming part of the Atlantic Corridor route, connecting the planned Cork to Limerick motorway with the partially completed Cork-Waterford N25 dual carriageway.

=== Completed sections ===
- N4 Colloney to Sligo
- N15 Ballyshannon/Bundoran bypass
- N4 Sligo inner relief road
- N17 Tuam bypass
- M17 Galway to Tuam
- M18 Limerick to Galway
- M20 Limerick to Patrickswell
- N20 Blarney to Cork
- N25 Waterford City Bypass
- N25 Cork to Midleton

=== Proposed developments ===
- N25 Carrigtwohill to Midleton road - construction rescheduled
- M20 Patrickswell to Blarney - planning stage (as of 2020)

== See also ==
- Western Rail Corridor
- Wild Atlantic Way
- Transport in Ireland
