= R464 road (Ireland) =

Irish regional road

Coordinates: 52.668863°N 8.640183°W

R464 road
- Bóthar R464
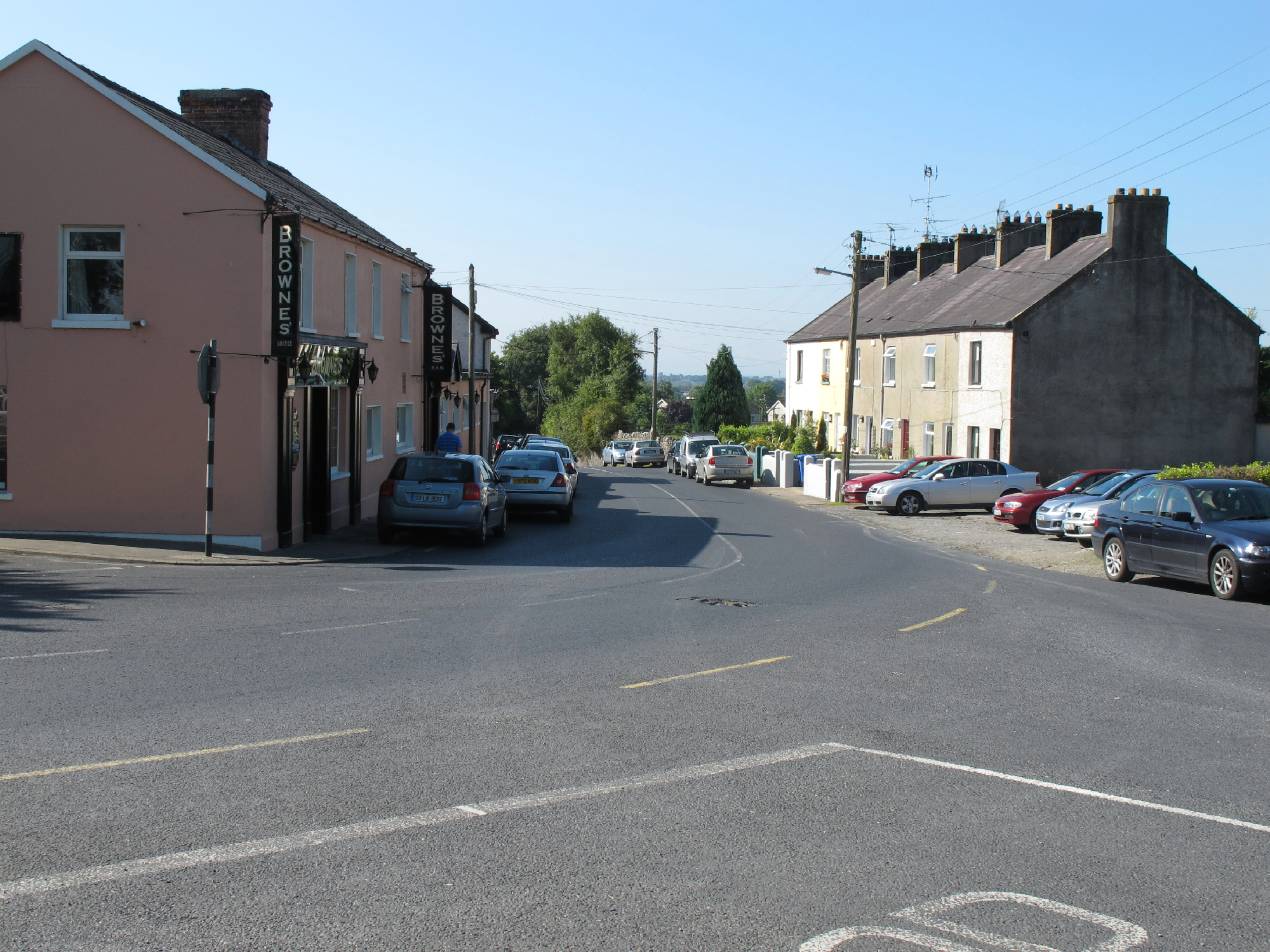
- R464 in Parteen

Route information
- Length: 5.4 km (3.4 mi)

Major junctions
- From: R463 Griffin's Cross
- Passes through Parteen; Crosses Tailrace Canal via Parteen Bridge; Enters County Limerick; Crosses Western Railway Corridor; R445 Limerick (Hassett's Cross); R857 Limerick (Union Cross)
- To: R527 Limerick (Condell Road)

Location
- Country: Ireland

Highway system
- Roads in Ireland; Motorways; Primary; Secondary; Regional

The R464 road, also called the Kileely Road, is a regional road in Ireland, located in County Clare and County Limerick.
