= R471 road (Ireland) =

Road in Ireland

Coordinates: 52.752719°N 8.724786°W

R471 road
- Bóthar R471
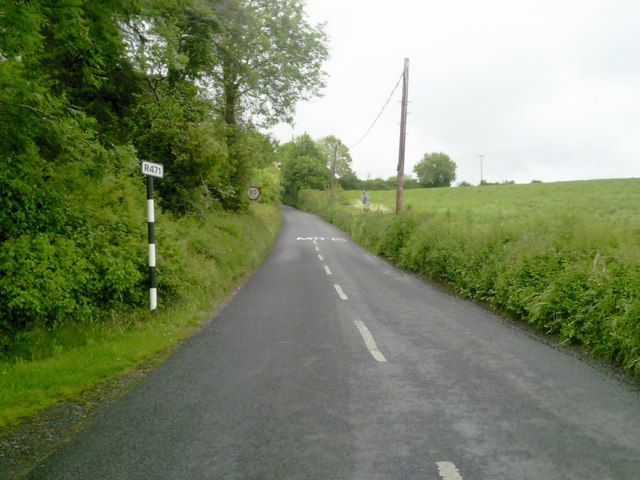
- Near Sixmilebridge

Route information
- Length: 25.6 km (15.9 mi)

Major junctions
- From: R472 Shannon
- N18 Shannon; R470 Sixmilebridge; R462 Sixmilebridge; R465 Aharinaghbeg
- To: R463 Limerick (Cloonlara)

Location
- Country: Ireland

Highway system
- Roads in Ireland; Motorways; Primary; Secondary; Regional

The R471 road is a regional road in Ireland, located in County Clare.
