= R461 road (Ireland) =

Road in Ireland

Coordinates: 53.012016°N 8.777366°W

R461 road
- Bóthar R461
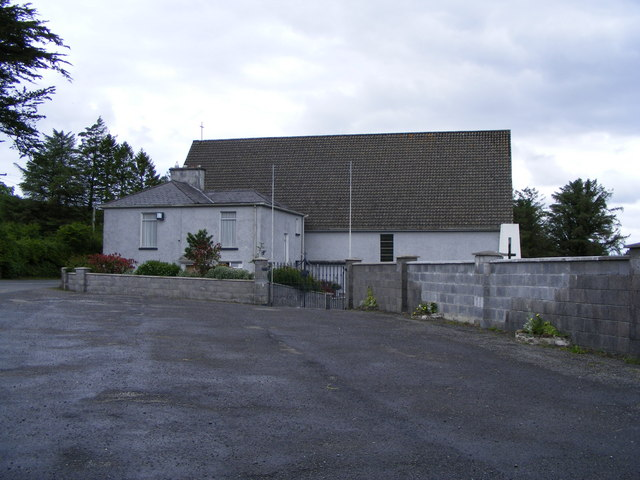
- Church at Killanena, part of the R461

Route information
- Length: 28.0 km (17.4 mi)

Major junctions
- From: R458 Tiraloughan
- R468 Feakle
- To: R352 Scarriff

Location
- Country: Ireland

Highway system
- Roads in Ireland; Motorways; Primary; Secondary; Regional

The R461 road is a regional road in Ireland, located in County Clare and County Galway.
