= M17 motorway (Ireland) =

Motorway linking Tuam to the M6 in Ireland

M17 motorway
- Mótarbhealach M17

Route information
- Length: 25.5 km (15.8 mi)
- Existed: 27 September 2017–present
- History: Opened on 27 September 2017

Major junctions
- From: Junction 18, east of Galway.
- J18 → M6 motorway, M18 motorway J19 → N63 road
- To: Tuam

Location
- Country: Ireland
- Primary destinations: M6, Roscommon, Tuam

Highway system
- Roads in Ireland; Motorways; Primary; Secondary; Regional

The M17 motorway (Irish: Mótarbhealach M17) is an inter-urban motorway in Ireland, forming part of the Sligo to Galway national primary road.

== Route ==
The motorway runs between the Kilmore Roundabout in Tuam and Junction 18 on the M6 motorway. There is one Junction (19) which is an exit for Roscommon and Claregalway.

== Junctions ==
County	km	mi	Junction	Destinations	Notes
County Galway			18 (Note: Exit numbers continue on from M18.); Rathmorrissy Interchange	M6 Dublin, Galway	Continues as M18 motorway towards Limerick.
County Galway			19	N63 – Roscommon R354 – Claregalway	
County Galway			20	N83 ‒ Headford, Claregalway R939 – Tuam (South)	Motorway ends at roundabout. Continues as N17 dual carriageway bypassing Tuam.
1.000 mi = 1.609 km; 1.000 km = 0.621 mi: Route transition

== History ==
A number of upgrade projects were planned for the N17, which forms part of the Atlantic Corridor under Transport 21, along with the N18 and N20. Prior to the 2017 upgrade, the Southern Section N17 was the state's busiest single-carriageway inter-urban road with over 25,000 vehicles using the road at Claregalway daily of which over 20,000 travel on the Claregalway-Galway section south of Claregalway.

In April 2014, this project was given the go-ahead by the Government and was opened to the public by Minister Shane Ross on 27 September 2017, many months ahead of schedule.

The motorway is not tolled.
