= R463 road (Ireland) =

Regional Road in Ireland

R463 road
- Bóthar R463
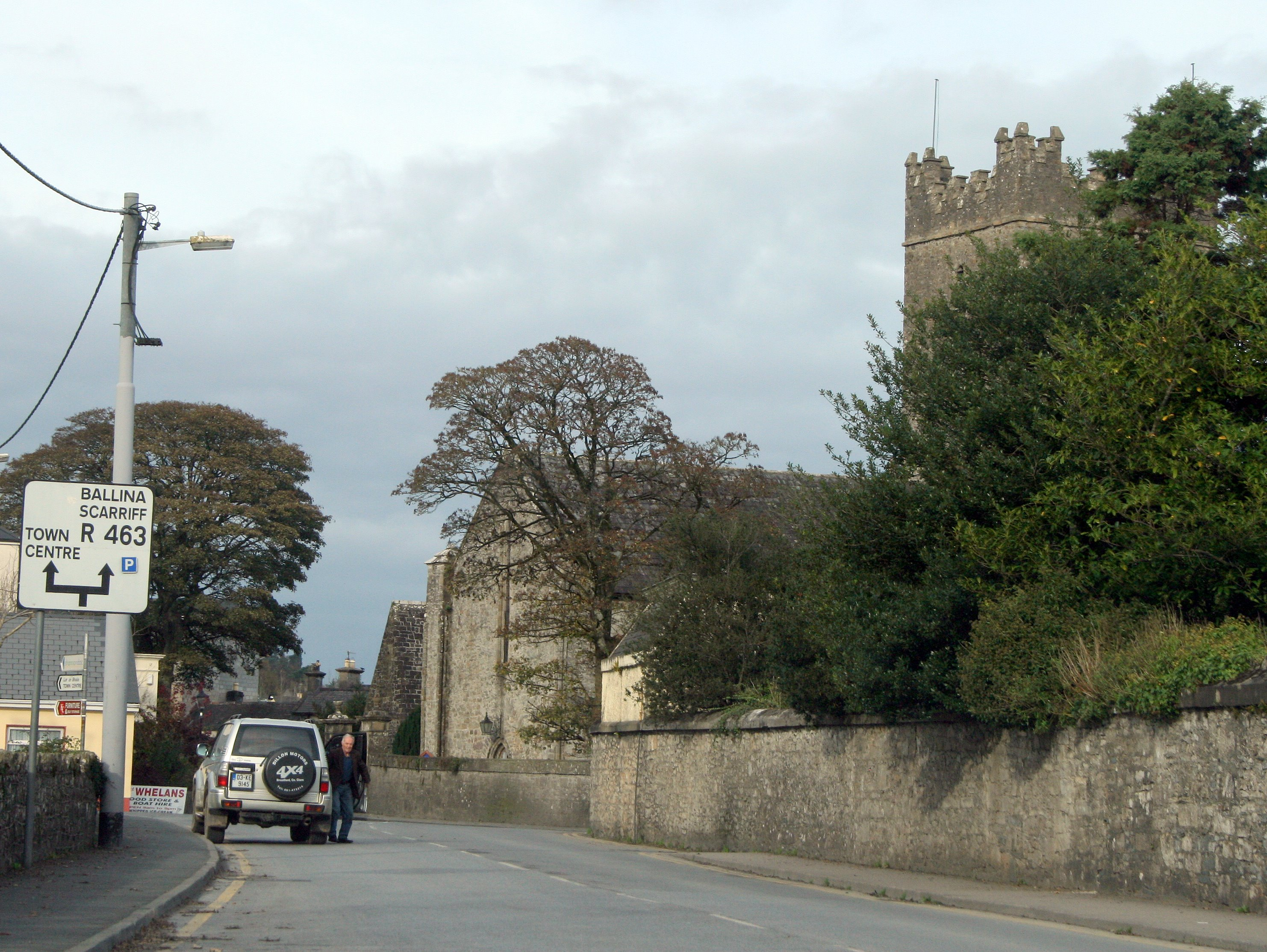
- R463 entering Killaloe from the south

Route information
- Length: 41 km (25 mi)

Location
- Country: Ireland
- Primary destinations: County Clare; Tuamgraney – junction with the R352; Ogonnelloe; Annacarriga; Killaloe – joined across the River Shannon to the R494; O'Briensbridge – (R466); Cloonlara – (R471); (R465); (R464); County Limerick; Terminates in Limerick city centre

Highway system
- Roads in Ireland; Motorways; Primary; Secondary; Regional

The R463 road is a regional road in Ireland which runs north-south from the R352 at Tuamgraney, County Clare to Limerick city centre. The road passes on its way through Killaloe and O'Briensbridge. The route is 41 km (25 mi) long.

== See also ==
- Roads in Ireland
- National primary road
- National secondary road
