= R467 road (Ireland) =

Road in Ireland

Coordinates: 52.850111°N 8.663915°W

R467 road
- Bóthar R467

Route information
- Length: 4.3 km (2.7 mi)

Major junctions
- From: R352 Clogher
- To: R466 Rosneillan

Location
- Country: Ireland

Highway system
- Roads in Ireland; Motorways; Primary; Secondary; Regional

The R467 road is a regional road in Ireland, located in County Clare.
