= R468 road (Ireland) =

Road in Ireland

Coordinates: 52.894268°N 8.658817°W

R468 road
- Bóthar R468

Route information
- Length: 6.6 km (4.1 mi)

Major junctions
- From: R461 Feakle
- To: R352 Ballynahinch

Location
- Country: Ireland

Highway system
- Roads in Ireland; Motorways; Primary; Secondary; Regional

The R468 road is a regional road in Ireland, located in County Clare.
