= R472 road (Ireland) =

Road in Ireland

Coordinates: 52.730563°N 8.905383°W

R472 road
- Bóthar R472

Route information
- Length: 6.0 km (3.7 mi)

Major junctions
- From: R458 Newmarket-on-Fergus
- M18 Junction 10
- To: N19 Shannon Town Roundabout

Location
- Country: Ireland

Highway system
- Roads in Ireland; Motorways; Primary; Secondary; Regional

The R472 road is a regional road in Ireland, located in County Clare.
