= William Haliday =

Irish language enthusiast

William Haliday (1788–1812) was an Irish language enthusiast. He sometimes used a Gallicized version of his name William O'Hara, in some documents his surname is misspelt Halliday. The son of a Dublin tradesman, he was born around 1788, studied the Irish language, and produced a grammar of it aged 19 under another the assumed name, Edmund O'Connell (signing E.O'C). He trained as a solicitor. In 1808 he assisted Edward O'Reilly, Dr. John Lanigan, and Father Paul'O'Brien (Professor of Irish at Maynooth College) in founding the Gaelic Society of Dublin, an effort to save the Irish language.

He died aged 24, on 26 October 1812 and is buried in Taney Parish, graveyard, Dundrum, with an inscription on his tomb by Dr. Lanigan. His younger brother was the historian Charles Haliday.

== Publications ==
- Uraicecht na Gaedhilge (A grammar of the Gaelic language) by "Edmund O'Connell (E.O'C)" (a pseudonym for William Haliday), Printed by John Barlow, in Dublin (1808).
