= Theophilus O'Flanagan =

Irish teacher, translator and scholar

Theophilus O’Flanagan (Irish: Tadhg Ó Flannagáin) (c. 1762 – 1814) was an Irish school teacher, translator, and Irish language scholar.

Born circa 1762 in Tulla, County Clare, son of a hedge schoolteacher of Irish, he was educated at Trinity College Dublin. He was a Catholic. He earned a scholarship in 1787 with the support of Provost John Hely-Hutchinson. He worked as a travelling school teacher, he set up schools in Carrick on Suir, and on Ormond Quay in Dublin in 1808.

O'Flanagan, along with Richard MacElligott and Patrick Lynch, founded the Gaelic Society of Dublin on 19 January 1807, for the promotion and study of the Irish language, with O'Flanagan as its first secretary. Although the Gaelic Society would be short lived, it was the first of several such organizations founded to promote the Irish language, culminating in the Gaelic League in 1892. O'Flanagan died in 1814.

== Works ==
- Translation of the Annals of Innisfallen by Theophilus O'Flanagan
- Transactions of the Gaelic Society of Dublin, edited by Theophilus O'Flanagan AB, Published by John Barlow Dublin (1808).
- 'Deirdri, Or the Lamentable Fate of the Sons of Usnach, an Ancient Dramatic Irish Tale, One of the Three Tragic Stories of Eirin:', translation, notes, and observations, by Theophilus O'Flanagan AB, Published by John Barlow Dublin (1808). Also printed in ibid.
