= R352 road (Ireland) =

Road in Ireland

Coordinates: 53.053219°N 8.350431°W

R352 road
- Bóthar R352
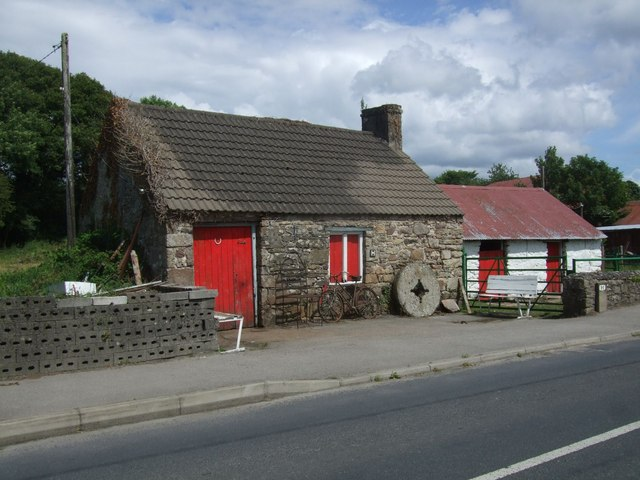
- Mountshannon, County Clare, on the R352

Route information
- Length: 73.2 km (45.5 mi)

Major junctions
- From: N85 Ennis (Claureen Roundabout)
- R458 Ennis (Maid of Erin); R871 Ennis (Gort Road); M18 Junction 13; R462 Cutteenmore; R466 Kilbogoon; R467 Clogher; R468; R465 Bodyke; R463 Tuamgraney; R461 Scarriff; Passes through Mountshannon; Enters County Galway; Crosses Woodford River (Clonco Bridge); R351 Clonco; Crosses Cappagh River; R353 Killeen South
- To: N65 Portumna

Location
- Country: Ireland

Highway system
- Roads in Ireland; Motorways; Primary; Secondary; Regional

The R352 road is a regional road in Ireland, located in County Clare and County Galway.
