= R353 road (Ireland) =

Road in Ireland

Coordinates: 53.064989°N 8.771567°W

R353 road
- Bóthar R353
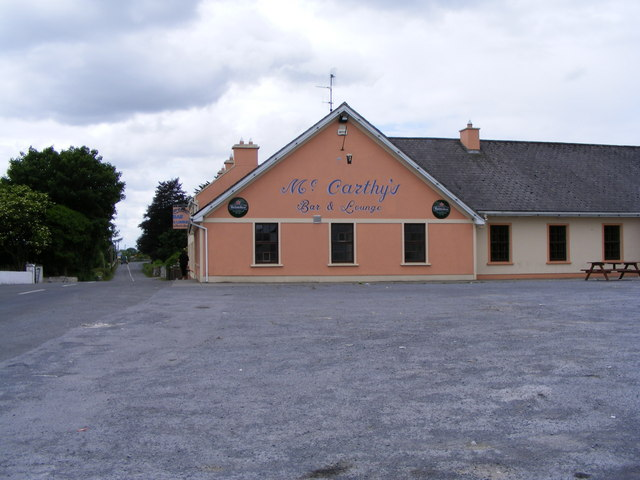
- R353 passing McCarthy's Bar and Lounge, Kilbeacanty

Route information
- Length: 39.2 km (24.4 mi)

Major junctions
- From: Gort
- R351 Newtown South; Crosses Cappagh River
- To: R352 Killeen South

Location
- Country: Ireland

Highway system
- Roads in Ireland; Motorways; Primary; Secondary; Regional

The R353 road is a regional road in Ireland, located in County Galway.
