= Eddie Lenihan =

Irish storyteller, writer and broadcaster

Edmund Lenihan (born 1950), known as Eddie Lenihan, is an Irish author, storyteller, lecturer and broadcaster. He is one of the few practising seanchaithe (traditional Irish lore-keepers and tale-spinners) remaining in Ireland.

== Biography ==
Lenihan is a native of Brosna, County Kerry, Ireland, but As of 2020 resides in Crusheen, County Clare. His college education was at Saint Ita's College in Abbeyfeale, County Limerick and University College in Galway. He is a collector and preservationist of folk tales, recording stories told by older people as passed to them in oral tradition, and then distributing them to a wider audience via print, audio and filmed recordings.

Lenihan is known for his tales of Irish folk heroes, fairies, fallen angels, and other supernatural beings as recorded in Irish mythology, folklore and oral history. He has also published poetry, stories about historical and legendary women of Ireland, and railroad history. In his role as a cultural preservationist he maintains the largest private collection of folklore in Ireland.

He first developed a reputation as a storyteller for children. But as his reputation began to grow, he began to appear in film, such as: The Fairy Faith, in a series of programmes on BBC radio, and at numerous high-profile folk festivals.

== Conservation activism ==
In the 2004 reprint of his 2003 book, Meeting the Other Crowd: The Fairy Stories of Hidden Ireland Mr. Lenihan explained his continuing dismay at the rapid loss of Irish cultural heritage and artefacts resulting from industrialisation of rural Ireland. He described his motivation to preserve hill forts, rural dwellings and native plants in the context of general preservation of folkways. He also briefly described how his conservation ethics had come to disagreement with the centralised progressive goals of modernist planners.

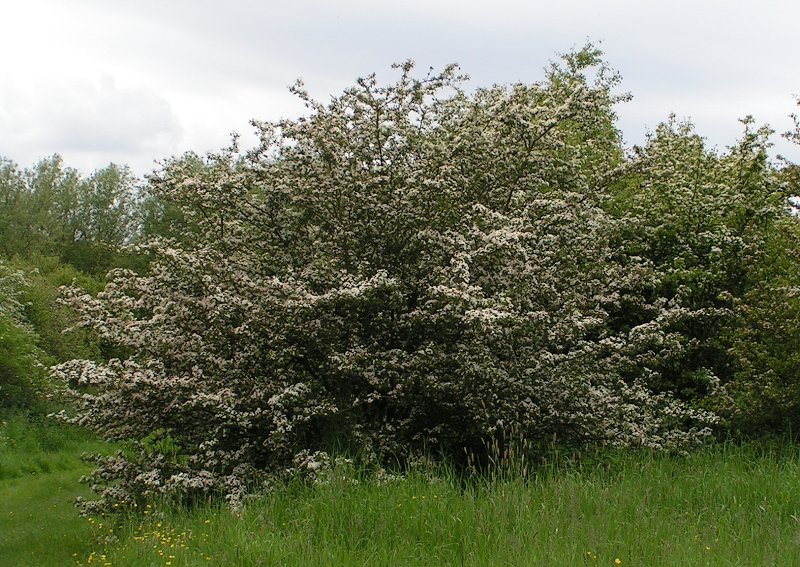
Common Hawthorn, also known as Whitethorn

This had come to international attention in 1999 when Lenihan had stood up to road builders in County Clare who had wanted to cut down a whitethorn tree commonly called the Latoon fairy bush. (The whitethorn is considered in local Irish lore, and Celtic folklore in general, to be sacred to the Aos Sí – the fairy folk of Ireland.) In local tradition, this specific tree was believed to serve as the meeting place for the fairies of Munster whenever they prepared to ride against the fairies of Connacht. His activism and protests had made international headlines, and succeeded in altering the road project to spare the tree.

In the 1999 incident he used the tactic of mobilising public awareness by telling the old, traditional stories that mentioned the traditional significance of the tree, as well as the punishments that came to those who harmed the abodes of the fairies.

== Lenihan's informants ==
In his cultural preservation efforts Mr. Lenihan relies heavily on local informants. These individuals are (often elderly) members of the rural community who are steeped in a tradition of oral history.

=== Jimmy Armstrong ===
Jimmy Armstrong was born in 1914 in Ballyrougham, the son of a land steward for a Protestant landlord. His stories of the people, places and heroes of County Clare were incorporated into the 1982 book, Long Ago by Shannonside. His importance in Lenihan's estimation was "...remarkable, then equally significant is the fact that one such man's death can deprive an area of a large part of its oral tradition at one blow".

== Works ==
=== Books ===
- Lenihan, Edmund. Long Ago by Shannonside (1982) Mercier Press. Cork; Dublin. ISBN 978-0-85342-671-4
- Lenihan, Edmund. A Loss of Face and Other Poems (1983) Inchicronan Press. Crusheen, Co. Clare. OCLC: 17518025
- Lenihan, Edmund. The Portrait Gatherer (1984) Inchicronan Press. Crusheen, Co. Clare. ISBN 978-0-9509140-1-5
- Lenihan, Edmund. Even Iron Men Die (1985) Inchicronan Press. Crusheen, Co. Clare. OCLC: 33124197
- Lenihan, Edmund; Frances Boland. Stories of Old Ireland for Children (1986) (republished 1997) Mercier Press. Cork. ISBN 978-0-85342-777-3
- Lenihan, Edmund; Joseph Gervin. Strange Irish Tales for Children (1987) (republished 1992) Mercer Press. Cork. ISBN 978-0-85342-833-6
- Lenihan, Edmund. In Search of Biddy Early (1987) Learning Links. ISBN 978-0-85342-820-6
- Lenihan, Edmund. In the Tracks of the West Clare Railway (1990) Mercier Press. Cork; Dublin. (republished 1991) Irish American Book Co. ISBN 978-0-85342-909-8
- Lenihan, Edmund. Ferocious Irish Women (1991) Mercier Press. Dublin. ISBN 978-0-85342-977-7 (Republished in 1997 as Defiant Irish Women ISBN 978-1-85635-188-1)
- Lenihan, Edmund. The Devil Is an Irishman (1995) Mercier Press. ISBN 978-1-85635-016-7
- Lenihan, Edmund. A Spooky Irish Tale for Children (1996) Mercier Press. Dublin. ISBN 978-1-85635-150-8
- Lenihan, Edmund; Athena Alchazidu. Neuvěřitelná irská dobrodružství (1991) Ando. Brno. ISBN 978-80-86047-07-2 (Czech language)
- Lenihan, Edmund. Gruesome Irish Tales (1997) Mercier Press. Cork. ISBN 978-1-85635-197-3
- Lenihan, Edmund. Humorous Irish tales for children (1998) Mercier Press. Cork; Dublin. ISBN 978-1-85635-238-3
- Lenihan, Edmund. Wad of Notes (1998) Gem and Emerald Books. ISBN 978-0-9525813-0-7
- Lenihan, Edmund. The Savage Pigs of Tulla (2000) Mercier Press. Cork; Dublin ISBN 978-1-85635-323-6
- Lenihan, Edmund. Rowdy Irish Tales for Children(2001) Mercier Press. Cork; Dublin. ISBN 978-1-85635-366-3
- Lenihan, Eddie; Carolyn Eve Green. Meeting the Other Crowd: The Fairy Stories of Hidden Ireland (2003) Gill & Macmillan. Dublin. ISBN 978-0-7171-3659-9 (Republished 2004) Jeremy P. Tarcher/Putnam. New York. (Penguin edition) ISBN 978-1-58542-307-1
- Lenihan, Edmund; Alan Clarke, Irish Tales of Mystery and Imagination (2006) Mercier Press. Cork; Dublin. ISBN 978-1-85635-519-3 (title as listed by Worldcat)
- Lenihan, Eddie; Alan Clarke. Irish Tales of Mystery and Magic (2006) Mercier Press. Cork; Dublin. ISBN 978-1-85635-519-3 (title as listed by Amazon.com)

=== Media ===
- Lenihan, Edmund. Fionn MacCumhail and the Dark Pool (1983) Ceirnini Cladaig. Baile Atha Cliath, Éire. OCLC 73342345 (Cassette Tape)
- Lenihan, Edmund. Niamh and the Giant (1984) Claddagh Records. Dublin. OCLC: 39034369 (Cassette tape)
- Lenihan, Edmund. Story Teller. (1986) Claddagh Records. Dublin. OCLC: 64861824 (Cassette Tape)
- Lenihan, Edmund Storyteller 2 (1988) Claddagh Records. Dublin. OCLC: 39034419 (Cassette tape)
- Aziz, Peter; Elizabeth Jane Baldry; Neil Boyle (II); and Hugh Boyle (III). The Fairy Faith (2001) Wellspring Media. ASIN: B00005K9OQ (Documentary DVD)
- Lenihan, Edmund; Colcannon (Musical group); Windhorse Productions. The Good People (2001) Sounds True. Boulder. OCLC: 47106057 (Cassette Tape)
- Lenihan, Edmund; "Tell Me a Story Podcast" (2020) Produced by Philip Murphy & John Lillis.

== See also ==
- Traditional knowledge
- Alan Lomax (folk music archivist)
- Brothers Grimm (folklore conservators)
