= R351 road (Ireland) =

Road in Ireland

Coordinates: 53.161486°N 8.487428°W

R351 road
- Bóthar R351
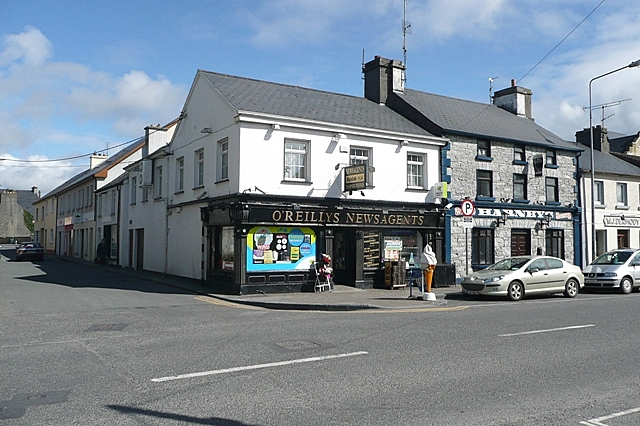
- Barrack Street, Loughrea, on the R351

Route information
- Length: 26.7 km (16.6 mi)

Major junctions
- From: R446 Loughrea
- Crosses Duniry River; R353 Cregg
- To: R352 Clonco

Location
- Country: Ireland

Highway system
- Roads in Ireland; Motorways; Primary; Secondary; Regional

The R351 road is a regional road in Ireland, located in County Galway.
