= R475 road (Ireland) =

Road in County Clare, Ireland

Coordinates: 52.835301°N 8.990803°W

R475 road
- Bóthar R475

Route information
- Length: 1.6 km (0.99 mi)

Major junctions
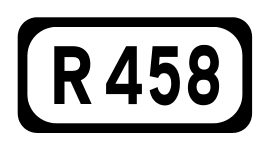
- From: Ennis

- To: Kilrush Road Roundabout

Location
- Country: Ireland

Highway system
- Roads in Ireland; Motorways; Primary; Secondary; Regional

The R475 road, known as the Kilrush Road, is a regional road in Ireland, located in central County Clare.
