= R470 road (Ireland) =

Regional road in County Clare, Ireland

Coordinates: 52.759976°N 8.853056°W

R470 road
- Bóthar R470
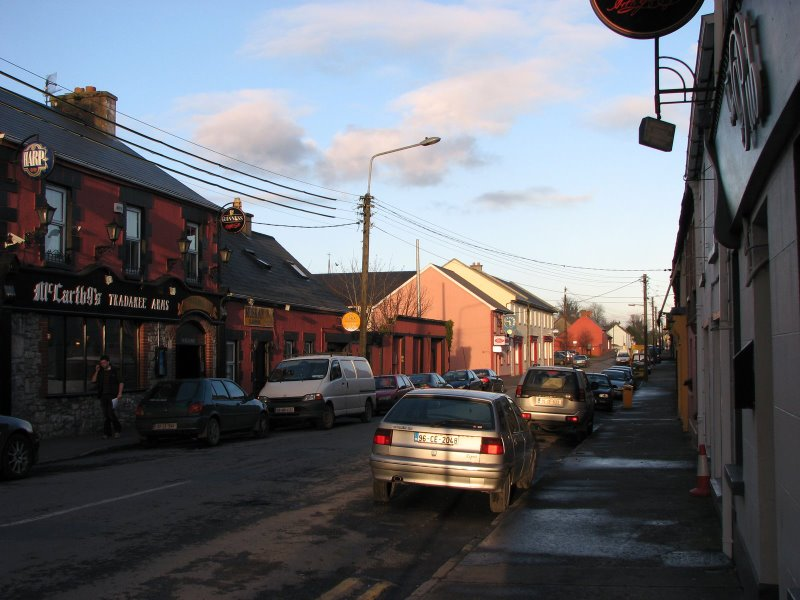
- The R470 in Newmarket-on-Fergus

Route information
- Length: 15.2 km (9.4 mi)

Major junctions
- From: R458 Newmarket-on-Fergus
- Crosses Western Railway Corridor
- To: R471 Sixmilebridge

Location
- Country: Ireland

Highway system
- Roads in Ireland; Motorways; Primary; Secondary; Regional

The R470 road is a regional road in Ireland, located in County Clare.
