= The Clare Champion =

Newspaper in County Clare, Ireland

- The Clare Champion office in Ennis
- Type: Weekly newspaper
- Format: Broadsheet
- Owner: Clare Champion Ltd
- Editor: Colin McGann
- Founded: 1903
- Language: English
- Headquarters: Barrack St, Clonroad Beg, Ennis
- City: Ennis
- Country: Ireland
- Website: clarechampion.ie

The Clare Champion is a weekly local newspaper in Ennis, County Clare, Ireland. It was founded in 1903 after The Clare Man was forced to close.

In February 1918 it was banned and County Clare was declared a military area.

Many people have been associated with The Clare Champion over the years. Andy McEvoy came to the paper in 1925 as editor. He retired in 1950. Earlier one of the paper’s reporters was Pat Quinn, who later moved to Dublin to become the political correspondent of the Irish Independent. Larry DeLacey was the editor for most of the 1950s and was followed by George Mulvey and Frank O’Dea, who came to the paper in 1959 and retired in 1996.

Austin Hobbs joined the paper in 1979; he served as editor until May 2018, when he was succeeded by Peter O’Connell. The O’Connell era was a short-lived one, and he resigned as editor after just two years in the post, long-serving journalists Tony Mulvey and sports editor Seamus Hayes left shortly after his appointment. He was replaced by Colin McGann, the person to serve as editor of The Clare People before its closure.

Ex-journalists include Senan Carroll, former editor of the Leinster Leader, Dick Walsh, who went on to become political correspondent with the Irish Times, John Howard, RTÉ, Tom Glennon, chief sub-editor, Irish Times, and John McMahon, former editor of the Galway Observer.

Photographer John Kelly has been with the paper since 1990.
