= R469 road (Ireland) =

Road in Ireland

R469 road
- Bóthar R469
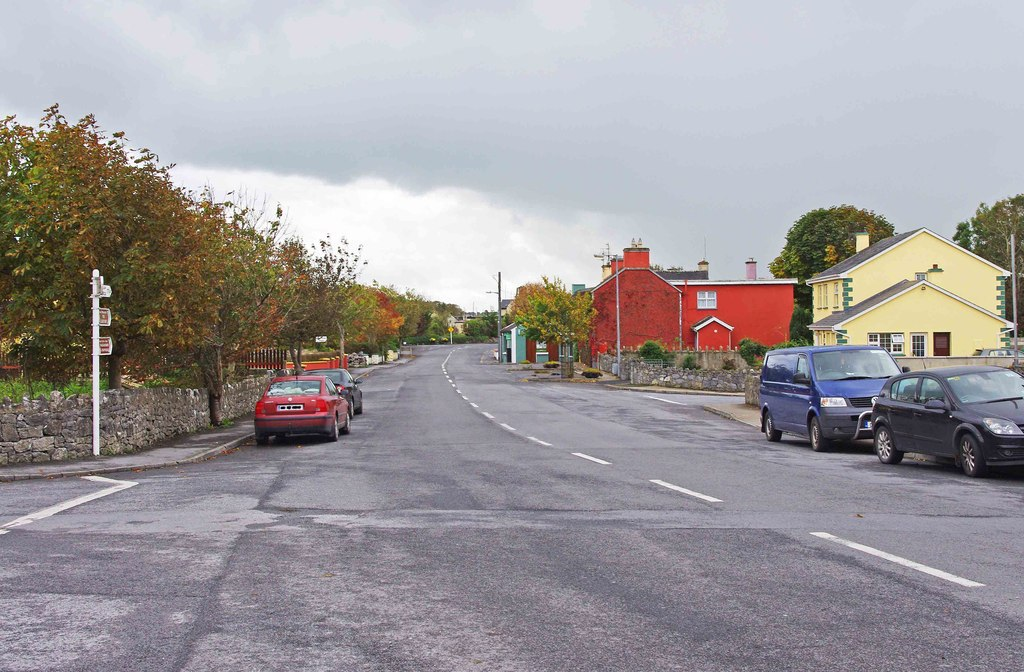
- In Quin, County Clare

Location
- Country: Ireland

Highway system
- Roads in Ireland; Motorways; Primary; Secondary; Regional

The R469 road is a regional road in Ireland linking Kilmurry to Ennis. The road is entirely in County Clare.

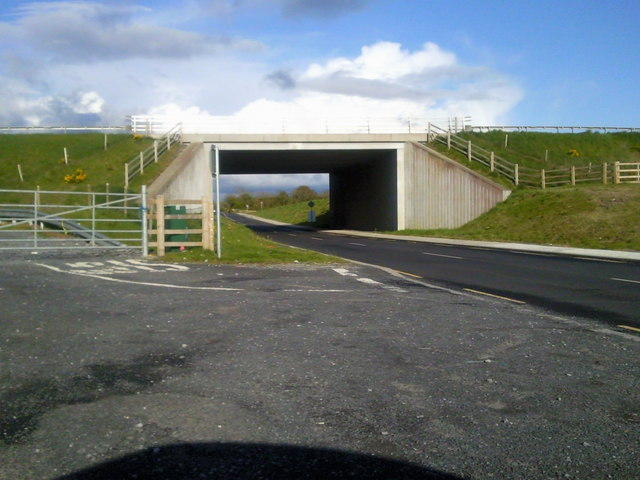
At M18 overpass

== See also ==
- Roads in Ireland
- National primary road
- National secondary road
