= Edward O'Reilly (scholar) =

Scholar and lexicographer from Ireland

Edward O'Reilly (Irish: Éadbhard Ó Raghallaigh; 6 December 1765 – 26 August 1830) was an Irish scholar active in the first half of the 19th century.

== Biography ==
O'Reilly was born on 6 December 1765. His grandfather was Eoghan O'Reilly of Corstown, County Meath. Edward's father moved to Harold's Cross, Dublin, where he practised as an apothecary. The History of the City of Dublin, Vol. II, p. 934, by John Warburton (1818) states- "Edward O'Reilly was educated in Dublin, where he had never heard Irish spoken. He applied himself to the study of the language by accident. In the year 1794 a young man of the name of Wright, who was about to emigrate from his native country, had a number of books to dispose of, which chiefly consisted of Irish MSS. They had been collected by the industry of a man of the name of Morris O'Gorman, who was clerk to Mary's-lane Chapel, and the person from whom Dr. Young, Bishop of Clonfert, and General Valancey, had learned Irish. This man's library, which filled five large sacks, Mr. O'Reilly purchased from Wright, and on examination found himself possessed of a collection of the rarest MSS., for one of which he has since refused fifty guineas. Master of this valuable repository, he commenced the study of the language, and by persevering application has acquired a deep knowledge of the ancient language of the country."

Edward O'Reilly undertook the compilation of the work for which he is best remembered, his Irish-English Dictionary published in 1817. He was appointed assistant secretary to the Iberno-Celtic Society on its foundation the following year with the purpose of preserving and promoting Irish literature. His work during the 1820s included a Dictionary of Irish Writers and catalogues of Irish manuscripts in Dublin libraries including Trinity College. He was one of the earliest collectors of Irish music and his collection is called "The Farmer and O'Reilly Collection". In May 1830, he was contracted to advise on Irish nomenclature for the early Ordnance Survey maps but spent only four months on this work before his death. Never a formal employee of the Survey, he was probably paid for his professional services. John O'Donovan replaced him in October 1830.

== Death ==
Edward O'Reilly died on Friday 26 August 1830 at Harold's Cross, Dublin. The executor of his estate was his cousin Fr. Eugene O'Reilly, parish priest of Navan, County Meath. His library of Irish manuscripts was sold in the same year by his executor and many volumes were purchased by the Royal Irish Academy.

== Family ==
Edward's older brother Andrew O'Reilly (1756 – 4 August 1862) was a United Irishman, the Paris correspondent for The Times and the author of the book "Reminiscences of an emigrant Milesian". Edward's son was Patrick O'Reilly who was educated at Navan school.
