= Drumline, County Clare =

Drumline Drom Laoinn
- Civil parish
- Location in Ireland
- Coordinates: 52°44′02″N 8°50′37″W
- Country: Ireland
- Province: Munster
- County: County Clare
- Time zone: UTC+0 (WET)
  - Summer (DST): UTC-1 (IST (WEST))

Drumline (Irish: Drom Laoinn) is a civil parish of County Clare, Ireland, located about 20 kilometres (12 mi) northwest of Limerick, just north of Shannon.

== Location ==
The parish is in the Bunratty Lower barony, and is 3 miles (4.8 km) southwest of Sixmilebridge and almost 3 miles (4.8 km) southeast of Newmarket-on-Fergus. It is 2 by 0.75 miles (3.22 by 1.21 km) and covers 2,955. In 1841 the population was 1,327 in 187 houses. A small part of the south of the parish lied on the River Shannon. The townlands are Ballycasey Beg, Ballycasey More, Ballycunneen, Crossagh, Culleen, Drumline, Firgrove, Knockaun, Mogullaan, Smithstown and Tullyvarraga.

== History ==
The parish is named after the townland of Dromline, or Druim Laigean in Irish, meaning the hillside of the spears. There were two castles. One, in the townland of Dromline, was owned in 1580 by Mortogh O’Brien, son of Conor, first Earl of Thomond. The other is in the townland of Smithstown (Baile na gabhna), and in 1580 was owned by O’Maoelconery. As of 1897 its ruins were in good condition.

The first known list of parishes for the diocese of Killaloe dates to 1303, and includes seven civil parishes that make up the present parish of Newmarket-on-Fergus. These were Kilnasoolagh, Tuamfinlough, Bunratty, Drumline, Clonloghan, Kilconry and Kilmaleery. After 1688 one priest served the five parishes of Bunratty, Drumline, Clonloghan, Kilconry and Kilmaleery. James O’Shaughnessy was appointed parish priest of the five parishes in 1776, and when James O’Halloran died in 1782 he was given charge of the other two. The penal laws were eased that year, but due to the shortage of priests the consolidated structure was retained.
