= Newmarket-on-Fergus (Roman Catholic parish) =

- Roman Catholic parish
- Location in Ireland
- Coordinates: 52°45′35″N 8°53′37″W
- Country: Ireland
- Province: Munster
- County: County Clare
- Time zone: UTC+0 (WET)
  - Summer (DST): UTC-1 (IST (WEST))

Newmarket-on-Fergus is a parish in the Roman Catholic Diocese of Killaloe. It is centred on Newmarket-on-Fergus, County Clare in Ireland.

== Origins ==
The church in Ireland was originally organized around monasteries. Diocesan organisation was instituted in 1111 AD by the Synod of Ráth Breasail. The first known list of parishes for the diocese of Killaloe dates to 1303; it includes seven parishes that constitute the present parish of Newmarket-on-Fergus. These were: Kilnasoolagh, Tuamfinlough, Bunratty, Drumline, Clonloghan, Kilconry and Kilmaleery.

Tuamfinlough (now Fenloe) is the oldest known settlement in the region of Newmarket. It was the site of a monastery founded early in the 6th century by Saint Luchtigern. The monastery was sacked by Turlough O'Brien in 1054. Bunratty had a large population in the 13th century, protected by the Normans, and probably the other churches were subordinate to Bunratty, apart from Fenloe. Kilnasoolagh became an independent parish in 1463 through a papal mandate. Drumline church dates back at least to the 8th century. Clonloghan church may date to the 10th century. Kilconry church dates to the 15th century, but is named after a 6th-century female saint. Kilmaleery may be named after a local chieftain. These churches were all closed during the Penal Law period.

== History ==
During the chaotic period that followed the "Glorious Revolution" of 1688, two priests served the area, one in Kilnasoolagh and Tuamfinlough, and the other in the five parishes of Bunratty, Drumline, Clonloghan, Kilconry and Kilmaleery. At this time laws strongly discouraged the Catholic religion. James O’Shaughnessy was appointed parish priest of the five parishes in 1776, and when James O’Halloran died in 1782 he was given charge of the other two. The penal laws were eased that year, but due to the shortage of priests, the consolidated structure was retained. Three churches replaced the original seven, sited within walking distance of the congregations. The parish retained this scope until 1967, when the Shannon was split off.

== Churches ==
There are three church buildings in the parish:

- "Our Lady of the Rosary", Newmarket on Fergus, is a modern church that was dedicated in 1971 by Bishop Michael Harty, replacing the 1802 church. It has seven gables in memory of the original seven parishes.
- "Our Lady of the Wells" in Clonmoney (Bunratty parish) dates to around 1829 and was enlarged in 1986–87.
- "St. Conaires" in Carrigerry (Kilconry parish) was opened in 1842, replacing a thatched church that was destroyed by a storm on 6 January 1839.
