= Kilnasoolagh =

Parish and townland in County Clare, Ireland

Kilnasoolagh Cill Átha na Súileach
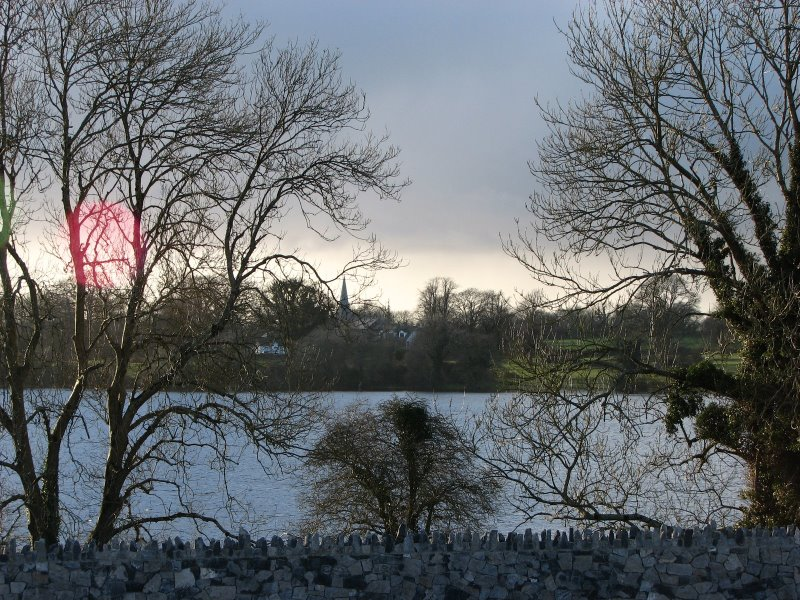
- Killinasoolagh church from across Lough Gash

- Location within Ireland
- Coordinates: 52.760561°N 8.90825°W
- Country: Ireland
- County: Clare

Area
  - Total: 2,079 ha (5,140 acres)
  - Water: 13 ha (32 acres)

Dimensions
  - Length: 5 km (3.1 mi)
  - Width: 5 km (3.1 mi)

Kilnasoolagh (Irish: Cill Átha na Súileach) is a civil parish in County Clare, Ireland, and a townland within that parish. Church records mention the parish in 1256.

== Location ==
In 1845 the parish lay on the west border of the barony of Lower Bunratty. It is 0.75 miles (1.21 km) west of Newmarket-on-Fergus and is 3.25 by 3 miles (5.23 by 4.83 km) in area. It covers just over 5,138 acres (2,079 ha), including 33 acres (13 ha) in Dromoland lake. The land is on the east of the upper Fergus estuary and is generally fertile. The parish contains the townlands of Ballygirreen, Ballynacragga, Ballysallagh East, Ballysallagh West, Ballyconneely, Carrigoran, Corkanaknockaun, Dromoland, Ing East, Ing West, Kilkieran, Knockmurragha, Knocksaggart, Latoon North, Latoon South, Lisduff, Kilnasoolagh, Rathfolan and Trennahow.

== History ==
Kilnasoolagh means the Church of the Religious People. There are records of a priest named Peter being in charge of the parish in 1256. The History of the Wars of Thomond often refers to Kilnasoolagh. In 1311 Mahone O'Brien and Loghlen Reagh O'Dea met there, and in 1312 Murtagh O'Brien plundered the church. The original church was pulled down by the Protestants, and a new one erected on the site.

The new Anglican church was built in 1686 by Sir Donough O'Brien of Dromoland Castle, replacing the earlier building or buildings. This was in turn replaced by a limestone church with seating capacity of 100 built in 1815 by James Pain. The entrance gate arch to the church may have come from an early building. The church holds a white marble sculpture of Sir Donogh O'Brien, the first baronet, carved by Louis-François Roubiliac (c. 1705–1762). (Note: Another source says the sculpture is the work of William Kidwell (c. 1664–1736) .)

The population in 1831 was 1,319. In 1841 it was 1,158, with 162 houses. As of 1834 there were 105 Protestants and 1,311 Catholics. In 1845 the dominant building in the parish was Dromoland Castle, owned by Sir Lucius O'Brien. There were two old castles, just beyond the boundary of the parish, and some ancient Druidical ovals or circles. The road from Limerick to Ennis crossed the parish.

== Today ==
Dromoland Castle is now a luxury hotel. Kilnasoolagh parish is today part of the Catholic parish of Newmarket-on-Fergus which also contains the civil parishes of Bunratty, Clonloghan, Drumline, Kilconry, Kilmaleery and Tomfinlough.
