= Tomfinlough =

Civil parish in County Clare, Ireland

Tomfinlough Tuaim Fhionnlocha
- Civil parish
- Location within Ireland
- Coordinates: 52.782254°N 8.838009°W
- Country: Ireland
- County: Clare

Tomfinlough (Irish: Tuaim Fhionnlocha) is a civil parish in County Clare, Ireland. A Christian establishment was first made here around 540 AD. The parish lands were often raided by Irish, Viking, Norman and English forces in the years that followed. The church was allowed to fall into ruins during the period when the Catholic Church was penalized in Ireland.

== Location ==
The ruined parish church stands at the northern end of the lake named Finn Lough or Fenloe. The name "Tomfinlough" means Tomb or Tumulus of the Fair Lake. It is in the barony of Bunratty Lower (Note: O'Donovan (1856) incorrectly places Tomfinlough in Bunratty Upper. But see, for example, Parliamentary Gazetteer: Barony of Bunratty (1845).) in County Clare, about 2 miles (3.2 km) northwest of the village of Six-Mile-Bridge. The parish contains the village of Ardsallis.

The parish contains the following townlands: Ayleacotty, Ballycar, Boheraroan, Caherkine, Caherscooby, Carrowmeer, Carrownakilly, Finlough, Granaghan, Granaghan Beg, Granaghan More, Kilnacrandy, Langough, Mausnarylaan, Mooghaun North, Mooghaun South, Muckanagh (Butler), Muckanagh (Studdert), Muckanagh (Vandeleur), Newmarket, Rathlaheen North, Rathlaheen South and Snugborough.

== History ==
Tuamfinlough is the oldest known settlement in the region of Newmarket-on-Fergus. Tomfinlough is said to have been founded by Saint Luchtighern mac-ui-Trato, a contemporary of Saint Mac Creiche who lived around 540, and probably belonged to the Trataidhe tribe. When the forces of Connaught were plundering the district of Corcomroe, the people sent a deputation to Emly. They asked Saint Ailbhe to persuade Saint MacCreiche, their relative, to return and plead for them with the king of Connaught. Mac Chreiche agreed, and came with his disciple Manchín. On the way they stopped at Tomfinlough where Luightighern agreed to accompany them.

The lands of Trataidhe were both fertile and vulnerable, and were often raided. The Danes destroyed the original church in 944. In 1854 a hoard of buried treasure hidden in a small stone chamber was unearthed in the Mooghaun North townland during the construction of the Limerick and Ennis Railway. It included many valuable gold items, including three gorgets that were given to the Museum of the Royal Irish Academy, and many rings, bracelets and other items. The total weight was over 174 ounces (4,900 g). Most of the treasure was sold to private bidders. It may have been booty collected by the Danes and buried after they were defeated by Brian Boroimhe (died 1014). According to the Annals of the Four Masters, the abbot Scannlan died in 944, and the lecturer Tuathal O’Muirgheasa died in 1049. In 1054 Torlogh O’Brien and the Connacians raided Thomond and sacked Tuaimfionlocha.

The church was closed during the Penal Law period. In 1744 the High Sheriff for Clare, John Westropp, reported to the authorities that, "I have according to your instructions made strict search in Ennis and in several other places where we had the least suspicion of priests and had the army from Clarecastle to assist me - but could find none. We have locked and nailed up all the Mass houses."

After the laws were relaxed, Tomfinlough became part of the Catholic parish of Newmarket-on-Fergus which also contains the civil parishes of Bunratty, Clonloghan, Drumline, Kilconry, Kilmaleery and Kilnasoolagh. In 1856 the parish was also part of a Church of Ireland deanery named Tradrai'gha, which included the parishes of Bunratty, Clonloghan, Drumline, Feenagh, Kilconry, Kilmaleery, Kilnasoolagh, Killowen, Tomfinlough and the island of Inis-da-dhrom.

== Church ==
The old church of Tomfinlough incorporates portions that are extremely old with more modern changes and additions. Large blocks of limestone in the southwest of the site are traces of a pre-Norman building which could date to the 10th century. Around 1300 the de Clare family restored the church and added at least two sandstone windows to the south and east walls. The building was restored again around 1480, and a new limestone-cut window was inserted in the east wall.

The church in 1839 measured 71 by 25 feet (21.6 by 7.6 m), with walls 15 feet (4.6 m) high and 2.8 feet (0.85 m) thick. There was a pointed doorway in the west gable 4.75 feet (1.45 m) high and 3.5 feet (1.1 m) wide. The lower 4 feet (1.2 m) of the gable seemed much older than the rest of the gable. The church had another door in the south side, and several windows, some divided into two, of different ages. One of the windows was decorated in the interior with carved human heads, much weathered. Another window appeared to date to at least the first part of the 10th century. In July 1907 the north wall of the ruined "old Abbey of Fenloe" collapsed.

== Other remains ==
There is a holy well near the church, where stations were still performed in 1839.

In 1839 a section of wall 9 feet (2.7 m) high and 12 feet (3.7 m) long stood about 180 feet (55 m) to the southeast of the church. It had large cut stones at its ends, like the angles of a house gable, and a doorway in the center 4.75 feet (1.45 m) high measured from ground level as it then was. The doorway was 1.76 feet (0.54 m) wide at the top and 2.17 feet (0.66 m) wide at the foot. This seems to have been the west end or gable of an ancient church. Above the doorway there were three human heads sculpted in stone. The middle one was very badly weathered but the other heads still preserved their features. These Romanesque heads may date to the 15th century. This would mean that the earlier building, identified as Saint Luchtighern's oratory, was renovated around this time, when the church was also renovated. The heads are still visible, but have been re-arranged so the central head is now one that is in good condition.

A traditional story tells of Luchtigern curing a woman inflicted by the plague, who came to him when he was working in the field at Tomfinlough with two deacons. One of the deacons was greatly impressed, and attributed the cure to God working through the saint. The other was skeptical. Luchtigern carved three faces on a stone, representing himself and the deacons, and said that heaven would show who was right. Soon the face of the skeptic was worn away, while the other two faces remained. There is a stone in the Tomfinlough graveyard wall with two raised solid circles on its face, about six inches in diameter. On has a rounded face and other a flat face with a small cross roughly engraved on it. It is called the "plague stone", and is associated with the legend.
