= Bunratty =

Village in County Clare, Ireland

Bunratty Bun Raite
- Village
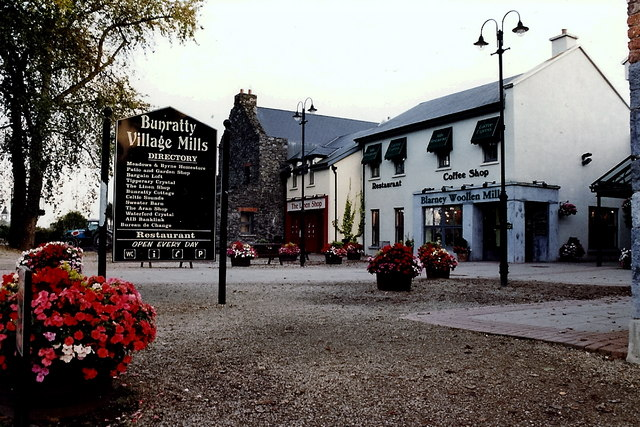
- Buildings in Bunratty village

- Location in Ireland
- Coordinates: 52°42′29″N 8°49′35″W
- Country: Ireland
- Province: Munster
- County: County Clare

Population (2022)
  - Total: 288
- Time zone: UTC+0 (WET)
  - Summer (DST): UTC-1 (IST (WEST))
- Website: www.bunratty.ie

Bunratty (Irish: Bun Raite, meaning "mouth of the Raite") is a village in County Clare, Ireland, near Bunratty Castle. It is connected by the N18 road to Limerick and Galway. The Raite river defines the parish's eastern boundary and flows into the Shannon Estuary, which defines the southern boundary.

== History ==
The first settlement in Bunratty may have been set up by Vikings in the 10th century. The Annals of the Four Masters report that Brian Boru destroyed a Viking settlement in the area in 977.

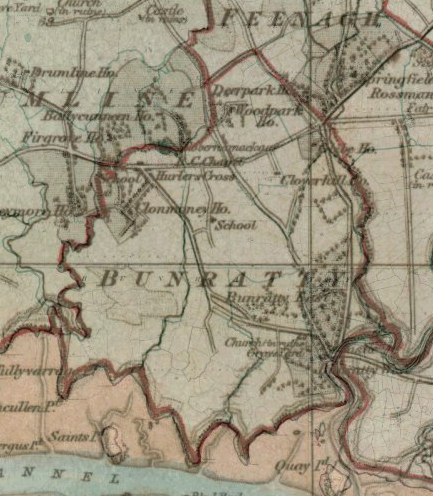
Bunratty Parish in 1842. The castle is in the southeast of the parish, and the Catholic chapel (the still existing Our Lady Of The Wells Church) is in the north.

Around 1250 the Anglo-Norman ruler Mucegros was given the right to hold a market and fair at Bunratty. He built the castle in 1277. The castle became the main residence of Richard de Clare, owner of all of Thomond. In the late 13th century, Bunratty had about 1,000 inhabitants. Richard de Clare was killed in 1311, and in 1314 the town of Bunratty was burned to the ground by the local people. The castle was sacked in 1332.

The current Bunratty Castle was built by the MacNamara family in the early part of the 15th century. It later became property of the O'Briens, who eventually made it their principal seat as Earls of Thomond. In the early 18th century it came into the possession of the Studdert family, who built Bunratty House in 1804.

In 1834 Bunratty parish had 55 Protestants and 1,340 Catholics. As of 1841 there were 1,320 people in 207 houses. The parish was crossed by the road from Limerick to Ennis, which ran past the castle. In the Roman Catholic system, Bunratty parish was united with Tomfinlough and Kilconry parishes. As of 1845 the castle was being used as a barracks by the Royal Irish Constabulary. During the Great Famine (1845 to 1852) Bunratty's population fell into decline.

Bunratty is the location of the death of the last British soldier to die in Clare during the Irish War of Independence. Private William Reginald Williams of the Royal Welsh Fusiliers was fatally injured in a motorcycle accident on 7 July 1921, just four days before both sides came to a truce. Though Williams' body was never recovered, a Commonwealth War Grave in his memory lies in the north-east corner of the old Bunratty graveyard adjacent to the Bunratty Castle Hotel..

In the 1950s, Bunratty's most prominent structure, the then ruined Bunratty Castle, attracted the attention of John Hunt, Lord Gort and the Irish Government. The castle was extensively renovated and opened to the public in 1960. Although Bunratty Castle thrived, becoming a major draw for early transatlantic tourists, the village population continued to decline.

== Location ==
Bunratty parish lies on the north shore of the River Shannon to the east of Drumline parish, south and west of Feenagh parish and west of Kilfintinan parish. The Ratty River, Ratty River, also named Owengarney River or O'Garney River, which flows into the Shannon, defines the eastern boundary of the parish. The parish is about 2.75 by 2.25 miles (4.43 by 3.62 km). It is part of the barony of Bunratty Lower.

Bunratty Castle overlooks the Raite river. The village lies to the west of the castle. Bunratty parish is today part of the Catholic parish of Newmarket-on-Fergus which also contains the civil parishes of Clonloghan, Drumline, Kilconry, Kilmaleery, Kilnasoolagh and Tomfinlough.

== Economy ==
Roadstone Wood operates a quarry in the center of the parish. It produces stone, blocks, concrete, mortar and blacktop. Eoin Gavin Transport has its road haulage office in Bunratty. The company founder, Eoin Gavin, began as the operator of an eight-wheel tipper from the quarry. Prior to the construction of the N18 bypass, the main road from Limerick and Shannon Airport to Ennis passed through the village.

Bunratty village itself caters mainly to tourists visiting Bunratty Castle and the Bunratty Folk Park. Besides Durty Nellys, styling itself as one of Ireland's oldest pubs, there are a number of other pubs/restaurants. The village also provides accommodation in the form of hotels and bed & breakfasts. Several shops also cater to the needs of travellers and tourists.

== Gallery ==
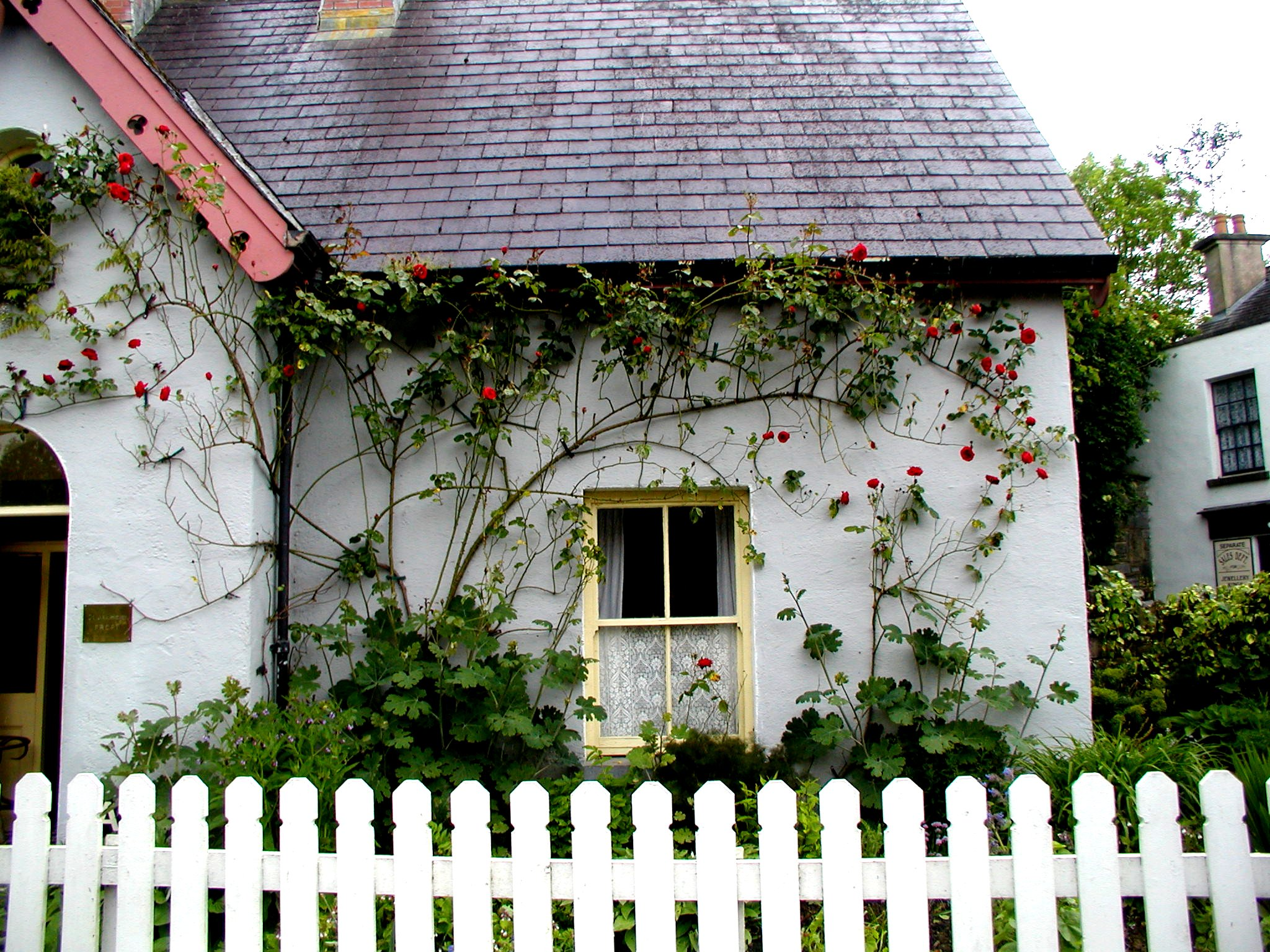
Rose Cottage in Bunratty folk park

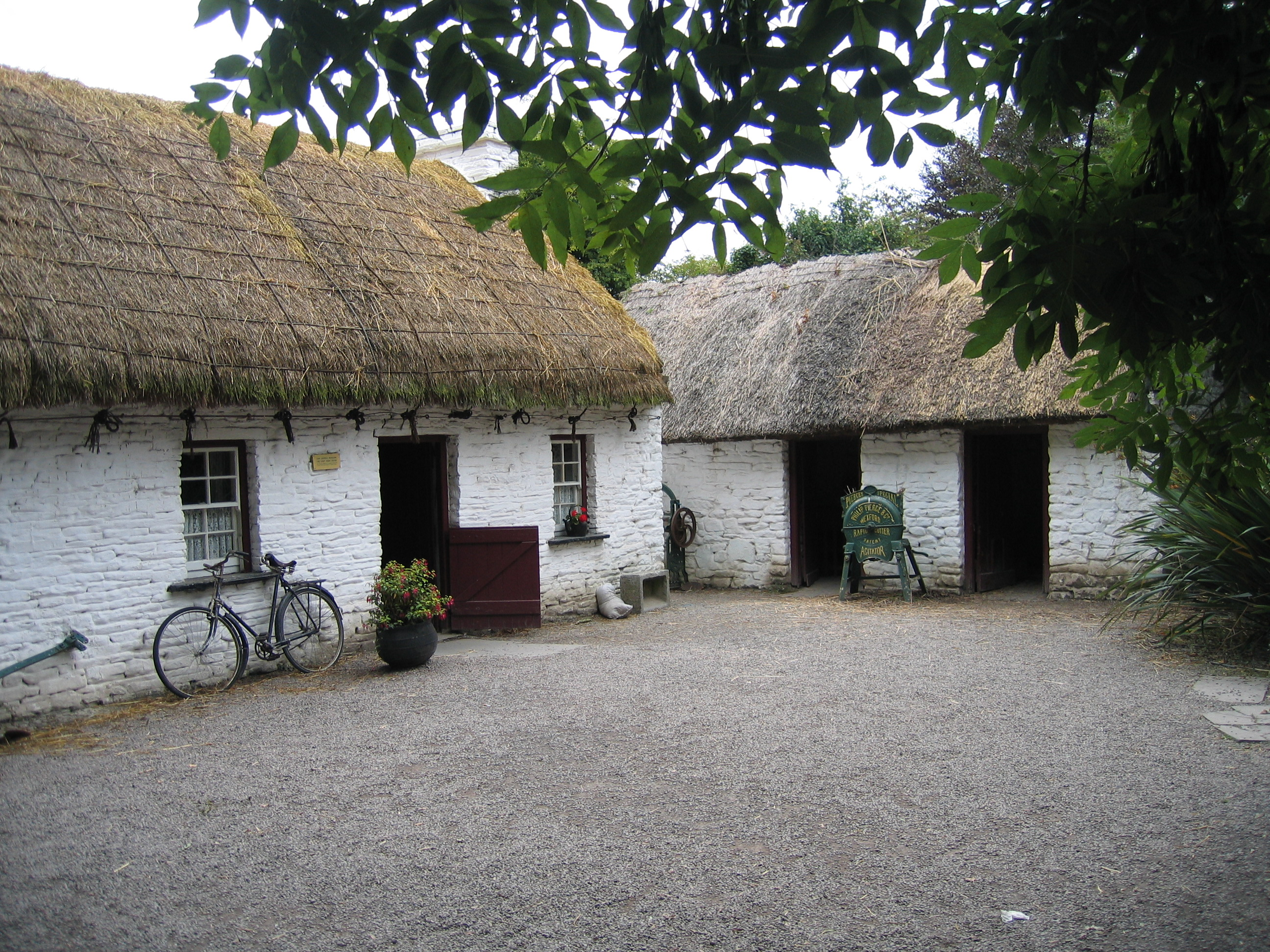
Cottages in the folk park

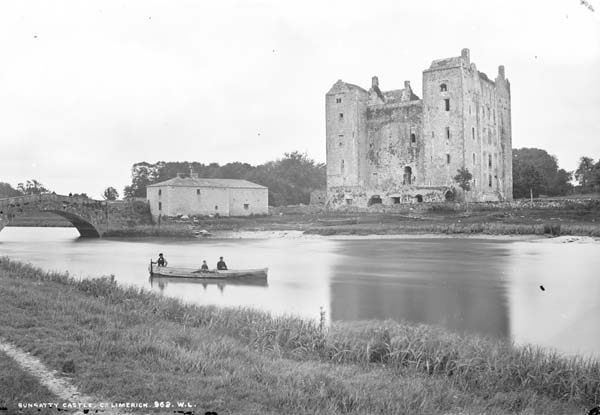
Bunratty Castle before 1914

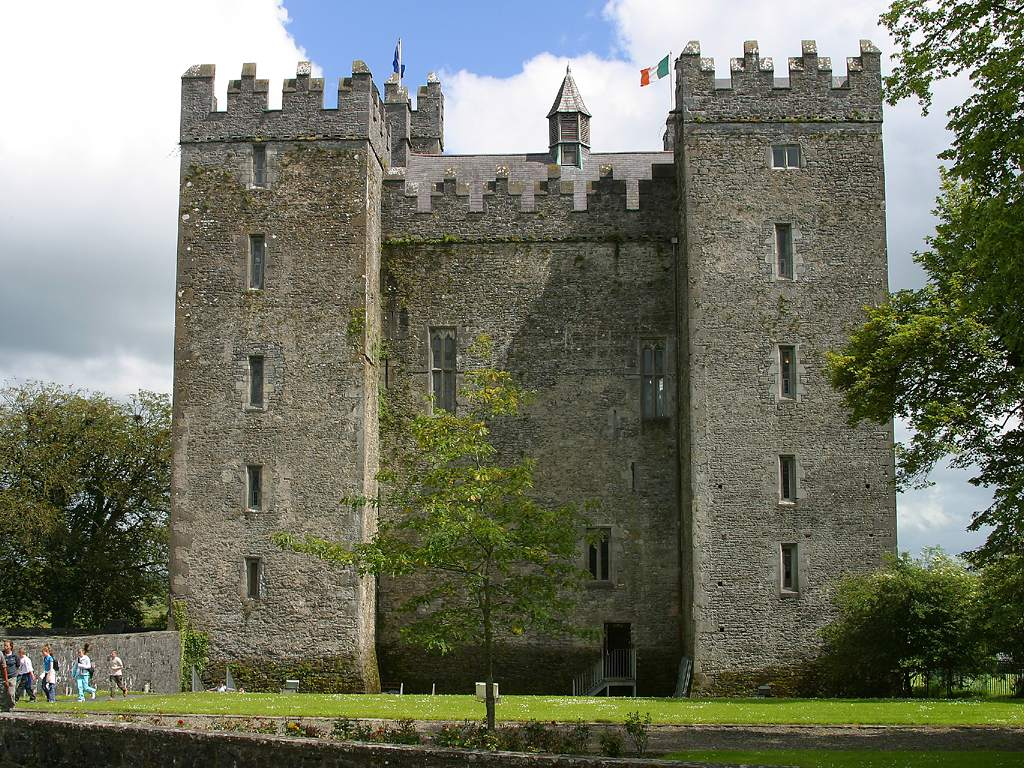
Bunratty Castle 2002

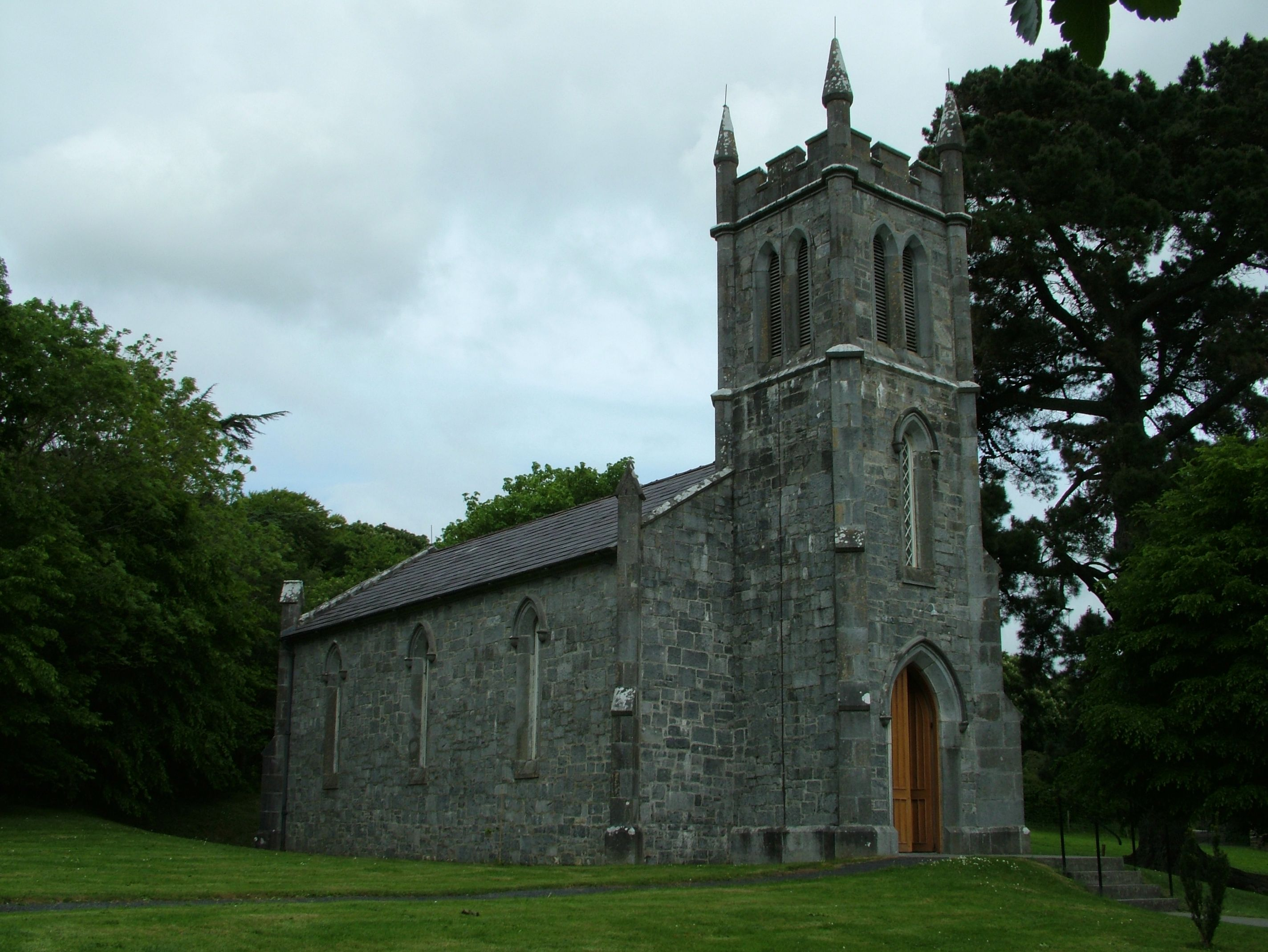
Church in the castle grounds
