= Mooghaun North Hoard =

Bronze Age hoard

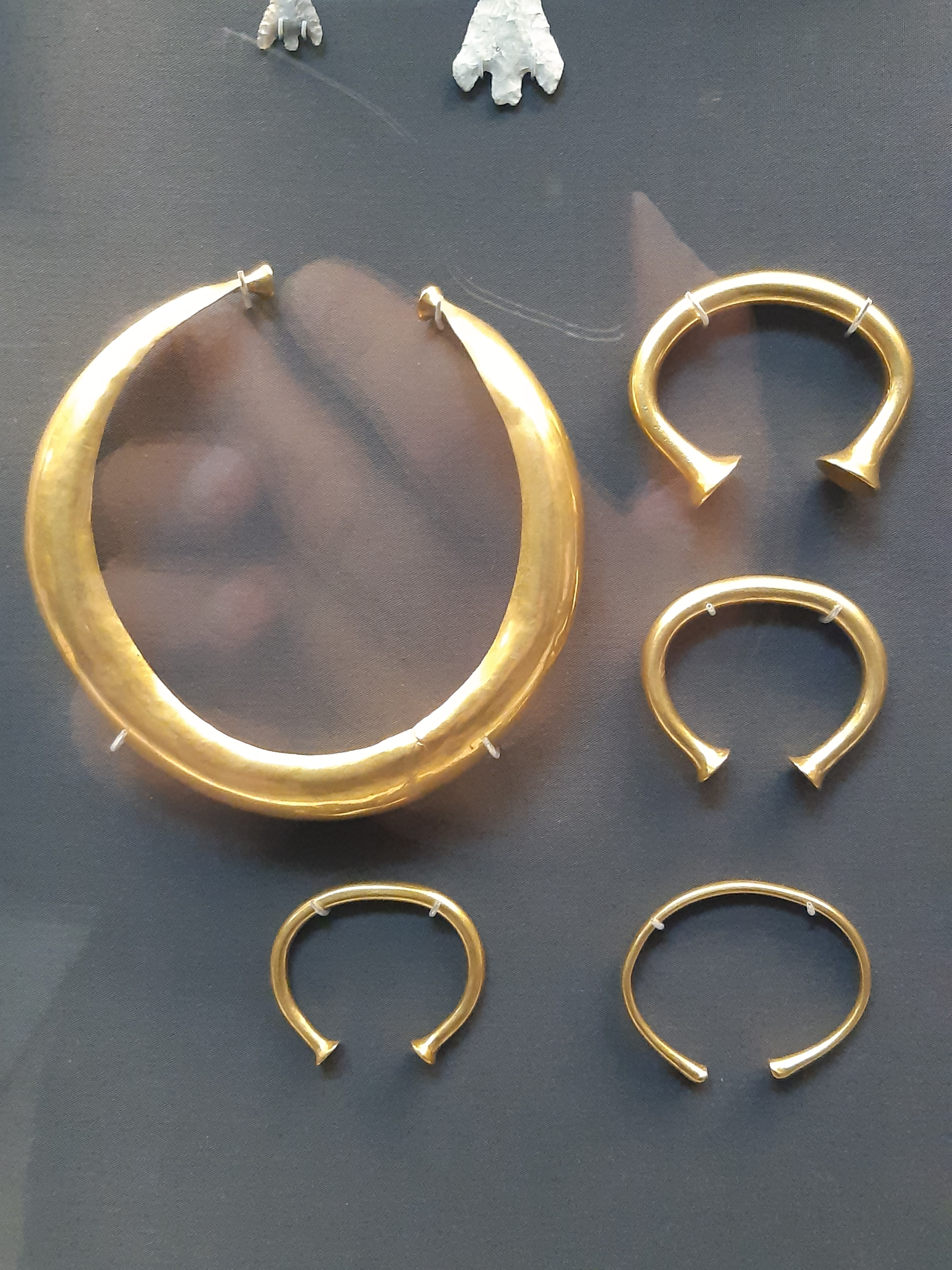
- Part of the hoard on display at the British Museum
- Material: Gold
- Created: 1150-750 BC
- Present location: British Museum, London National Museum of Ireland, Dublin
- Registration: 1857,0627.1-13 & WG.32

The Mooghaun North Hoard or Great Clare Find is the name of an important Bronze Age hoard found at Mooghaun North, near Newmarket-on-Fergus in County Clare, Ireland. Considered one of the greatest Bronze Age hoards of gold ever found north of the Alps, unfortunately most of the treasure was melted down soon after its discovery. What remains of the hoard is currently split between the National Museum of Ireland in Dublin and the British Museum in London. It is no. 11 in A History of Ireland in 100 Objects.

== Discovery ==
In March 1854, some workers building the West Clare Railway near Newmarket-on-Fergus were realigning a dyke near Mooghaun Lake, when they accidentally uncovered a huge cache of gold jewellery from the Bronze Age. While shifting a stone they brought to light a large cavity in the ground where the treasure was kept. Most of the precious objects were sold to local dealers who melted them down for their bullion value and only 29 out of a total of over 150 objects survived. Most of the British Museum's share of the find was purchased from William Willoughby Cole, 3rd Earl of Enniskillen in 1857.

== Description ==
When discovered, the Mooghaun North Hoard was one of the largest Bronze Age treasures ever found in Northern or Western Europe. It consisted of over 150 gold objects including 138 bracelets, six collars, two torcs and several other items which in total weighed over 5 kg. Just 29 objects survived the melting pot - 15 in the National Museum and 14 in the British Museum. The extant items of jewellery from the hoard are mostly crescent-shaped bracelets (23) and six neck collars. Fortunately many pieces from the hoard were copied before they were destroyed. Archaeologists are unsure why the hoard was deposited in the stone chamber - it may have been for safe-keeping during a local crisis or was perhaps a votive offering to the gods.

Recent research indicates that much of the gold used in the creation of these pieces came from the Mourne Mountains in County Down.

== See also ==
- Dowris Hoard
- Broighter Treasure

== Bibliography ==
- G. Eogan: The Hoards of the Irish later Bronze Age. Dublin, 1983. pp. 69–73.
- F. O'Toole: A History of Ireland in 100 Objects. Dublin, 2013.
- P. Wallace: A Guide to the National Museum of Ireland. Dublin, 2000.
