= Louise O'Sullivan =

Louise O'Sullivan may refer to:

- Louise O'Sullivan (businesswoman) (born 1973), Irish business executive
- Louise O'Sullivan (politician), former Montreal City Councillor and founder of Parti Montréal Ville-Marie
