= Shannon (parish) =

Shannon St. Senan's Parish
- Roman Catholic parish
- Location in Ireland
- Coordinates: 52.713731°N 8.868628°W
- Country: Ireland
- Province: Munster
- County: County Clare
- Time zone: UTC+0 (WET)
  - Summer (DST): UTC-1 (IST (WEST))

Shannon, officially - but largely unused - St. Senan's Parish, is a parish in County Clare, Ireland, and part of the Tradaree grouping of parishes within the Roman Catholic Diocese of Killaloe. It is a split off of the parish of Newmarket-on-Fergus

As of 2021, the co-parish priest is Arnold Rosney.

The main church of the parish is the Church of the Immaculate Mother of God, built in 1966.

The second church of the parish is the Church of St. John and St. Paul. This church was built in 1980. The bell was a donation of the Kilnasoolagh Church of Ireland parish and was used in the defunct church of Sixmilebridge. The bell had an engraving from 1771. The third church is the Adoration Chapel for Eucharistic Adoration, named as such in 1996. It began its career as an oratory dedicated to Our Lady of the Wayside.

The first church in the parish was an oratory on Shannon Airport, that served travellers, airport staff and later inhabitants of Shannon Town. It was demolished when the old terminal was replaced by a new terminal building. The original oratory was serviced by the clergy of Newmarket-on-Fergus.

== History ==
The existence of the parish is intertwined with the existence of Shannon Airport. It started with the aforementioned oratory on the airport. The development of this oratory, named St. Senan's Oratory, started in 1945 and was largely complete in 1946. In 1955 multiple rooms were in use as temporary oratory.

In 1957, the Shannon Free Airport Development Company (SFADCo) was founded, an organisation that was to have a major influence on the entire region. In 1959 SFADCo started building houses in what was to become Shannon Town with a predicted massive growth to some 30 000 inhabitants. Although the airport oratory want meant for passengers and staff only, the services were also attended by inhabitants of the new town. In 1964 the Parish Committee decided that the new community was in need for its own church, even a temporary one. SFADCo concurred with this and, als landowners, offered some locations. It would take to 1966 before the church was completed.

In a letter dated 28 June 1966 bishop Joseph Rodgers proposed to Canon Barry, parish priest of Newmarket-on-Fergus, to canonically create a separate parish for Shannon Town and environs. Due to the unexpected deaths of bishop Rodgers and the vicar general Fr. Quin, the caretaker, actual creation was delayed. Even so, in August 1966 the parish boundaries were defined with the area nearly identical to the landholdings of SFADCo. On 19 November 1967 Fr. Michael Harty was ordained as the new Bishop of Killaloe. He signed the documents and on 16 December 1967 St. Senan's Parish came into being.

The new parish consisted of parts of three of the seven mediaeval parishes that formed the parish of Newmarket-on-Fergus: roughly, the south-eastern part of Kilconry, the southern part of Clonloghan and the south-western part of Drumline.
