= Newmarket-on-Fergus =

Town in County Clare, Ireland

Newmarket-on-Fergus Irish: Cora Chaitlín
- Town
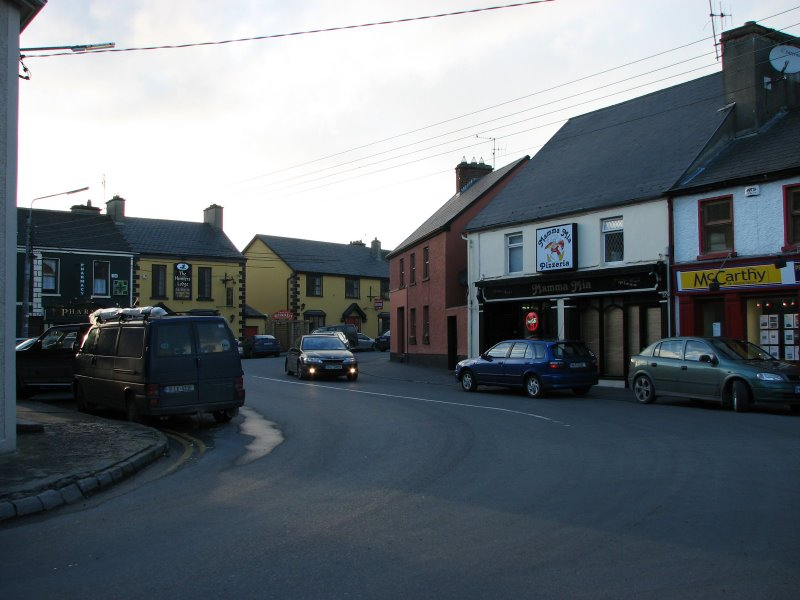
- Ennis Road

- Location in Ireland
- Coordinates: 52°45′35″N 8°53′37″W
- Country: Ireland
- Province: Munster
- County: County Clare

Population (2022)
  - Total: 1,887
- Time zone: UTC+0 (WET)
  - Summer (DST): UTC-1 (IST (WEST))
- Irish Grid Reference: R391682

Newmarket-on-Fergus, historically known as Corracatlin (Irish: Cora Chaitlín, meaning 'Caitlín's weir'), is a town in County Clare, Ireland. It is 13 km (8 mi) from Ennis, 8 km (5 mi) from Shannon Airport, and 24 km (15 mi) from Limerick.

== History ==
The English rendering of the name 'Newmarket-on-Fergus' probably owes its origin to the fact that an older 'Market' at nearby Bunratty (on the Ogarney River) predated the 'newer' market located at the village and hence Newmarket-on-Fergus; there is also a popular myth attributing the name-change to Lord Inchiqin who supposedly renamed the village after the famous racecourse, and following a victory at the horse-racing centre in England having wagered Dromoland Estate on the race. In the grounds of his neo-Gothic mansion, Dromoland Castle, is the most extensive hill-fort in Ireland, Mooghaun Hill-Fort, with several acres of ground encompassed within its treble walls. It is supposed to have been the site of a prehistoric walled village and a meeting place in about 500 BC. It is regarded as the oldest ring fort of its kind in Europe. The Gaelic name Cora Chaitlín is reputed to have its origins in a 19th-century famine where weirs were placed across the river Canny at Newtown Canny (i.e. Limerick Road near the present entrance to O'Regan Park) and Finn mill race, in which to snare eels, hence Cathleen's Weir. The proper and original name is transliterated 'Tradaree' from the Gaelic 'Tradraigh'; the village being the centre of that ancient district of Tradaree which extended from Bunratty in the south and to Latoon in the north.

One of the earliest known references to the area was in the Book of Survey and Distribution, written in 1636 by James Frost. In it, he mentions the main landowners of the area, among them the Earl of Thomond.

There is also mention of Bonratty (later Bunratty) of which Newmarket was in the Barony of, in a 1574 document written by Edward White. His document was written to give an accurate account of the lands of Thomond, of which, at the time, there had been several incorrect descriptions made.

The Parish of Newmarket-on-Fergus is a union of seven ancient parishes: Bunratty, Fenloe, Kilnasoolagh, Drumline, Clonloghan, Kilconry and Kilmaleery. During the Penal Law period of 1744, the High Sheriff of Clare, John Westropp, had all the Churches in these seven Parishes closed.

In a letter to The Secretaries of the Baptist Irish Society dated 20 December 1823, a travelling preacher named W. Thomas stopped over in Newmarket for a night and wrote a letter to the aforementioned Society. In it, he described the difficulties that people had in hearing a sermon, with some people walking miles over land just to hear the word of God. He also gives an insight into the poverty of the time, describing children in various states of dress akin to their poorness. He also describes the children's eagerness to learn scripture by heart.

In March 1854, about two miles from the centre of the village an immense amount of gold was found in what appeared to be a hastily hidden trove concealed in a stone chamber under a cam of slight elevation, near the lake of Mooghaun, or Lougha- traska.

On 5 August 1920, during the War of Independence, the village was the scene of a successful attack on the police barracks. With help from a turncoat, the Irish Republican Army entered the barracks and captured the present members of the Royal Irish Constabulary. The IRA seized weapons and official police documents before leaving.

In a 1962 published autobiography, 'My Father Marconi', Degna Marconi, the daughter of the inventor of the radio, Guglielmo Marconi, describes in detail holidaying on the Dromoland Estate in 1905.

In late June 2004, the first summit to take place between the US and the enlarged EU 25 Member States took place in Newmarket at Dromoland Castle.

In the Spring of 2007, six skeletal remains were found during the archaeological monitoring of improvement works to a local water network near Barnhill, Newmarket-on-Fergus. Dating showed that the remains were Pre-Christian.

== Geography ==
The town is situated about 10 km from Ennis. As its name implies, it lies close to the River Fergus. The main N18 Limerick–Ennis road passed through Newmarket until the town was bypassed in 2002. That main bypass road was renamed as the M18 on 28 August 2009 as part of a national programme to increase the amount of motorways available to road users.

Neighbouring towns and villages include Clarecastle, Ennis, Cratloe, Sixmilebridge, Quin and Shannon.

To the west of the town is Lough Gash, a turlough (disappearing lake) of considerable size.

== People ==
The earliest census to record the population of Newmarket took place in 1659. Newmarket, listed as Corraeathelin in the census as a part of the Barony of Bunratty showed the population as just 9 people living within the confines the village. As of the 2022 census, the population of Newmarket-on-Fergus was 1,887.

The town is the birthplace of Irish nationalist William Smith O'Brien. Irish President Michael D. Higgins, though born in Limerick, was educated in Ballycar National School.

== Commerce and tourism ==
The town has several small shops and public houses. The proximity of Shannon Airport, and the presence of several places of interest nearby (such as Bunratty Castle and Craggaunowen) brings some tourism to the area, providing business for local bed and breakfast establishments and hotels, like Dromoland Castle. On the grounds of Dromoland Castle is Mooghaun, a late Bronze Age hill fort.

Newmarket-on-Fergus houses the O'Regan Park, established on a site of about 6 hectares bought and donated by Brendan O'Regan. The park officially opened in 2003.

== Education ==
There are four primary schools in the parish: Scoil na Maighdine Muire/Newmarket-on-Fergus National School, Ballycar National School, Stonehall National School and Clonmoney National School. For secondary education, students attend schools in Ennis and Shannon.

== Transport ==
Newmarket-on-Fergus is located on the R470 and R458 roads. The N18/M18 is located 1 km away on the Newmarket-on-Fergus bypass. The nearest railway station is in Sixmilebridge. There is a bus service that serves the area on an hourly basis.

== Gallery ==
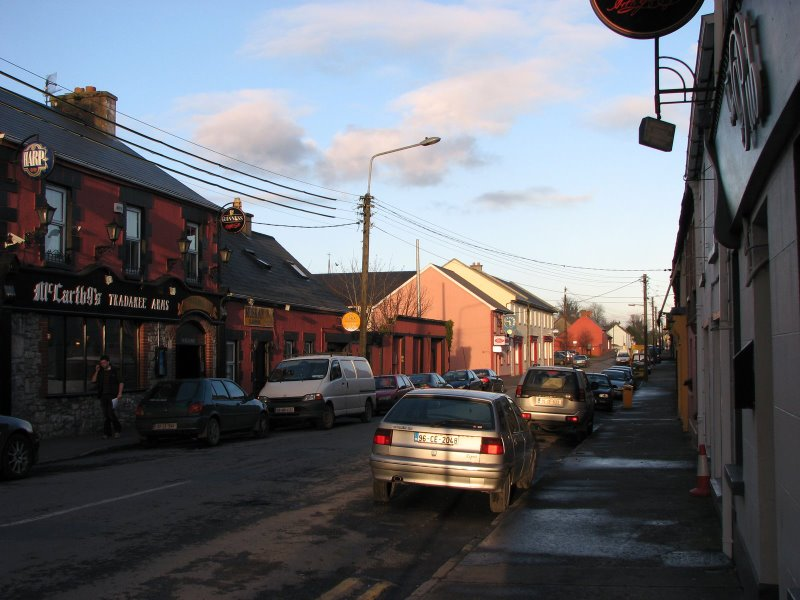
Ballycar Road

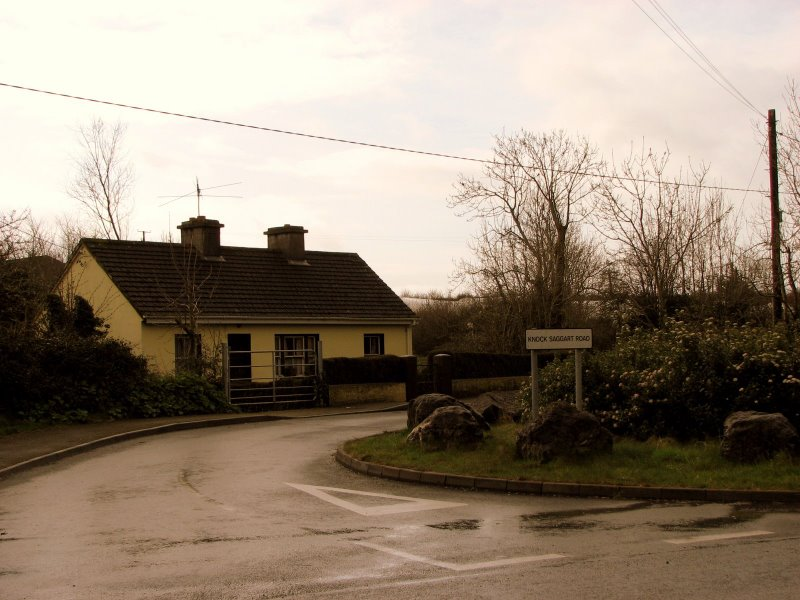
Knock-Saggart Road

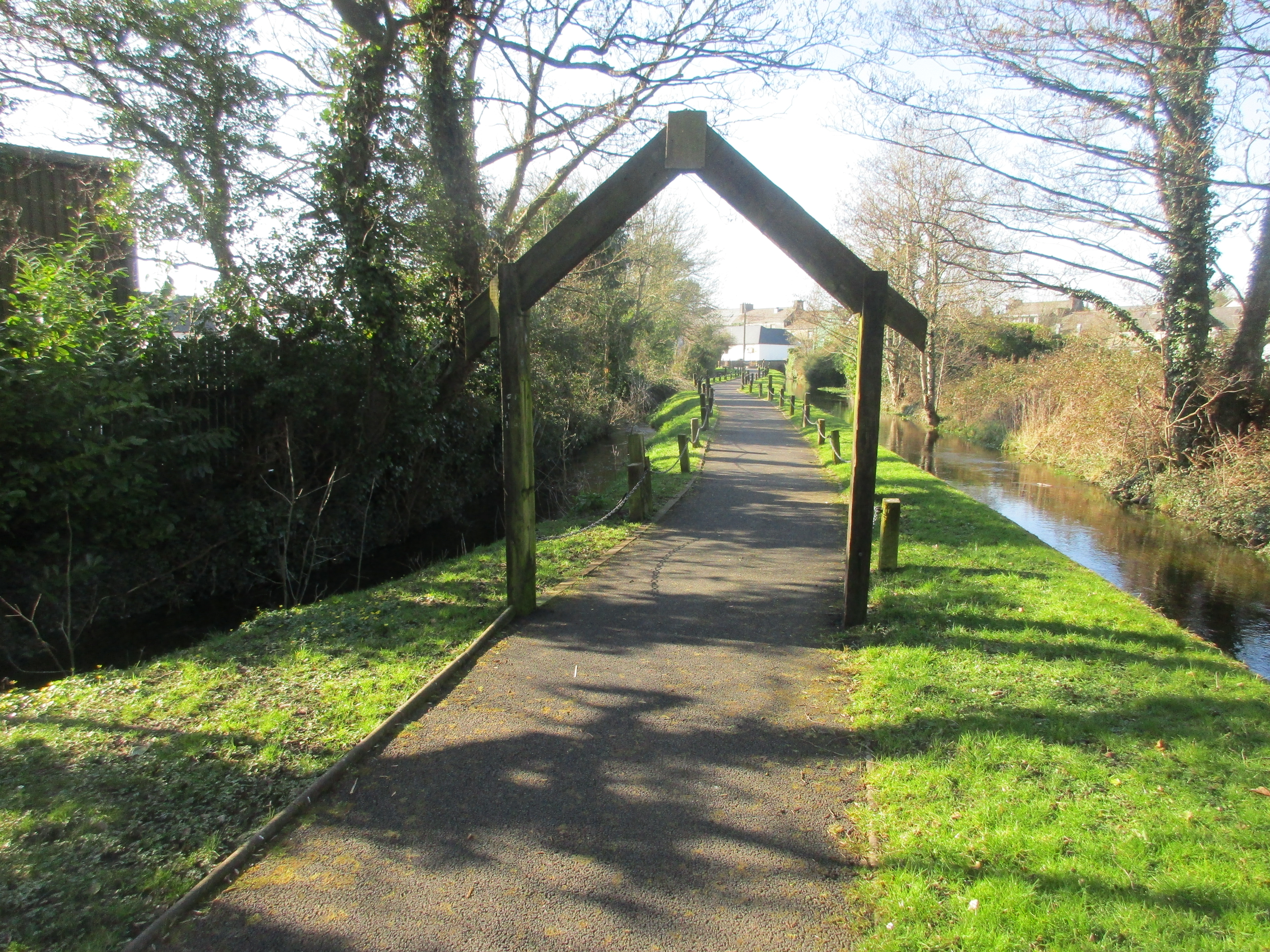
O'Regan Park with the Finn Mill Race canal on the right

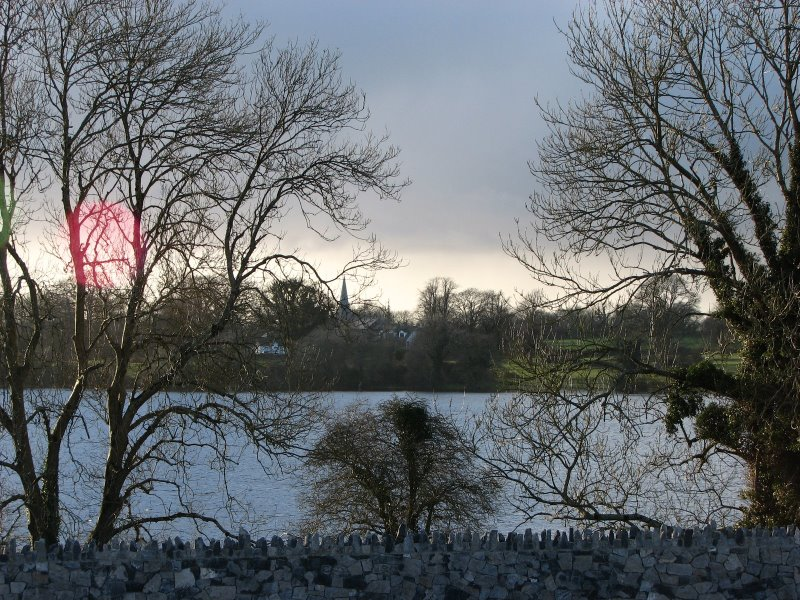
View over Lough Gash to Killinasoolagh Church

== See also ==
- List of towns and villages in Ireland
