= Brendan O'Regan =

Irish businessman

- Born: 15 May 1917; Sixmilebridge, County Clare, Ireland
- Died: 2 February 2008 (aged 90); England
- Known for: Development of Shannon Airport and the Shannon Free Zone

Brendan O'Regan CBE (1917–2008) was an Irish businessman responsible for developing Shannon Airport, inventing the concept of the duty-free shop and transforming the Shannon Region of Ireland. He was involved in promoting peace in Northern Ireland and co-operation between the Republic of Ireland and Northern Ireland. He has been described as one of Ireland's "most noted peace ambassadors and initiators of commercial and industrial projects". In a tribute to him, President Mary McAleese said that O'Regan was "a true visionary" and "leaves a legacy that permeates throughout all levels of economic, social and cultural life in Ireland."

== Early life ==
Born in Sixmilebridge, County Clare in 1917, O'Regan attended Blackrock College. He studied hotel management in Germany, France, Switzerland and the UK as his family had interests in hotels (the Old Ground Hotel in Ennis and the Falls Hotel in Ennistymon).

== Career ==
=== Early career ===
For a period, he was manager of the Stephen's Green Club in Dublin. In 1943, he was appointed as catering comptroller at Foynes flying boat base, which was a refuelling point for transatlantic seaplanes between Britain and the United States.

=== Shannon Airport ===
In 1945, he was appointed catering comptroller at Shannon Airport. From this base, he embarked on a series of projects which transformed the Shannon Region, many of which were replicated internationally. In 1947, he invented the concept of the airport duty-free shop, establishing the world's first at Shannon Airport. In 1951 he established the Shannon College of Hotel Management.

=== Shannon Free Zone ===
In 1961, he was the key driver in the establishment of Ireland's only regional development agency, Shannon Free Airport Development Company. He developed the Shannon Free Zone, a model for similar zones established throughout the world. He was chairman of Bórd Fáilte, the Irish Tourist Board from 1957 to 1973. After a visit to the United States under the Marshall Aid Plan, he drafted a report that became the blueprint for a vision of Shannon revolving around tourism, air freight and industry.

=== Shannon Town and Region ===
The success of the airport and industrial zone led to the development, spearheaded by O'Regan, of Shannon Town, the first new town in Ireland in over two centuries. He was responsible for initiatives such as turning Bunratty Castle into a tourist attraction with the co-operation of its owner Lord Gort, the model for similar initiatives at Knappogue Castle and Dunguaire Castle.

== Peace and co-operation ==
In 1978, O'Regan founded Co-Operation North (now Co-operation Ireland), a non-denominational and non-party organisation aimed at fostering co-operation between the Republic of Ireland and Northern Ireland. In 1984, he established the Irish Peace Institute to promote peace and reconciliation on the island of Ireland. He also founded the Centre for International Co-operation at Shannon in 1986.

== Honours and tributes ==
He received a number of tributes for his work. He was appointed Commander of the Order of the British Empire (CBE) in 1993 for his contribution to peace. He was voted "Clareman of the Year" in 1984 and was made Freedom of the City of Limerick in 1995. He received a number of honorary doctorates including from the National University of Ireland in 1978, from Queen's University Belfast in 1999 and from the University of Limerick in 2001.

In February 2007, Clare Museum held an exhibition, opened by the then Taoiseach Bertie Ahern to mark his achievements.

In 2015, a portrait of O'Regan was unveiled by Heather Humphreys, Minister for Arts, Heritage and the Gaeltacht at the Foynes Flying Boat and Maritime Museum.

Several initiatives have been named after him, including the O'Regan Park, a sporting and recreational facility in Newmarket-on-Fergus, and three restaurants, one at the Foynes Flying Boat and Maritime Museum, another at Shannon Airport and the third at the Old Ground Hotel.

== Personal life and death ==
In 1950 he married Rita Barrow and they had two sons, Andrew and Declan, and three daughters, Geraldine, Margaret and Carmel. He died on 1 February 2008, aged 90.

== 2017 centenary ==
Shannon Airport announced that it would commemorate the centenary in 2017 of the birth of O'Regan, described as "founder of Shannon Airport and the man behind so many of the great innovations of the region" In line with a call by Clare County Council, a bronze bust sculpture of Dr O'Regan was unveiled at Shannon Airport to commemorate this milestone on 15 May 2017 (the centenary of the birth) and RTE's Nationwide programme dedicated a special transmission to his legacy on 27 September 2017. The Irish Times published a comprehensive assessment of his life's work in 2018.

A second, life-size, bronze statue of O'Regan was unveiled beside his birthplace in Sixmilebridge on Monday 10 July 2023.

== Biography ==
- Brendan O’Regan: Irish Innovator, Visionary, Peacemaker by Brian O'Connell with Cian O'Carroll, published by Irish Academic Press, 2018.
