= Ardsallis =

Village in County Clare, Ireland

Ardsollus Áth Solas
- Village
- Location in Ireland
- Coordinates: 52°48′18″N 8°53′24″W
- Country: Ireland
- Province: Munster
- County: County Clare
- Time zone: UTC+0 (WET)
  - Summer (DST): UTC+1 (IST (WEST))

Ardsollus (Irish: Áth Solas, meaning 'bright ford') (historically also written as Ardsallis) is a townland in County Clare, in Ireland. The village is just outside the village of Quin and is to the south-east of Ennis. Previously it was served by the Ardsollus and Quin railway station which functioned from 1859 until 1963.

The village lies in the civil parish of Tomfinlough. In past times the area was famous for its horse racing and equestrian fairs.

== See also ==
- List of towns and villages in Ireland
