= Louise O'Sullivan (businesswoman) =

- Born: 1973 (age 52–53)
- Education: Shannon College of Hotel Management
- Occupation: CEO
- Organization: Anam Technologies
- Spouse: Peter O'Sullivan
- Children: 4

Louise O'Sullivan (born 1973) is an Irish telecommunications executive. She is the Founder and CEO of Anam Technologies, a Dublin-based firm which develops secure SS7 and SMS systems for mobile network operators. O'Sullivan entered the telecommunications field in 1995 and founded Anam Technologies in 1999. She left Anam in 2003 to start a family and, before returning in 2012, opened a restaurant, a music business, and a media firm. She is a vocal advocate for gender parity in the IT industry. In 2015 she was named one of the 50 Most Inspiring Women in European Tech by Inspiring Fifty.

== Education ==
She received a degree in hotel management from the Shannon College of Hotel Management.

== Career ==
O'Sullivan entered the telecommunications industry in 1995, working for Aldiscon first in marketing and later in bid management, project management, and account management. Although she lacked qualifications in the IT industry, she applied herself to learning on the job. Following Aldiscon's acquisition by Logica in 1997, she was assigned to the UK market.

In 1999, O'Sullivan left Logica to found Anam Technologies Ltd., raising €2m in seed money to develop the firm's text messaging systems. Media reports note that unlike other companies pursuing OTT messaging technology, Anam focuses on secure SS7 and SMS technology. Among its offerings are a patented home routing system that "enables mobile operators to protect their subscribers from SPAM messaging", and "an enhanced revenue stream, for mobile operators, that is emerging from A2P SMS".

In 2003, at age 30, O'Sullivan left Anam to start a family. She went on to open a restaurant, a music business, and a media firm. She returned to Anam in 2012.

== Honors ==
In 2015, O'Sullivan was named one of the 50 Most Inspiring Women in European Tech by Inspiring Fifty.

== Personal life ==
O'Sullivan is a vocal advocate for gender parity in the IT industry, writing articles and giving interviews on the subject. She also speaks on the adjustments women and their spouses or partners must make in order to combine motherhood with a corporate career.

She and her husband, Peter O'Sullivan, have four children.

== Selected articles ==
- "What Can Gender Parity Ever Do for Us?" The Huffington Post, June 11, 2015
- "The value of gender parity in tech startups" Wired UK, July 7, 2014
- "The Rise of OTT Applications and the Threat to SMS" Business Computing World July 11, 2013
