= St John's National School =

Primary school in County Clare, Ireland

Coordinates: 53.25615°N 6.12860°W

Information
- Religious affiliation(s): Church of Ireland
- Established: 1962; 63 years ago

St. John's National School was the first school established in Shannon, County Clare, Ireland, in 1962.

St. John's is a Church of Ireland affiliated school under the patronage of the Bishop of Limerick and Killaloe. Its foundation was paralleled with the opening of Christ Church (now closed) and other developments in the Shannon, County Clare area. Although the school pursues the Follow Me religious programme endorsed by The Church of Ireland, Methodist and Presbyterian Boards of Education, it is open to children of all religion or no religion.
