= Luchtigern =

- Born: Luchtighern Mac Ua Trato
- Died: c. 550
- Occupation: Christian leader
- Known for: Abbot of Ennistymon

Luchtigern (Latin: Luctigernus) was an early Christian leader who was active in Ireland in the 6th century, and has been recognized as a saint by the Catholic Church.

== Life ==
According to The Martyrology of Donegal Luchtigern's mother was Brigh, daughter of Forannan, son of Conall, son of Tochtan, son of Amhalgaidh, sister of Maelaithghin. He was a disciple of Saint Ruadhán of Lorrha. He appears to be a different person from Luchern or Luctigern, a disciple of Saint Comgall at Bangor. Luchtigern presided over the abbey of Ennistymon, which has since disappeared without trace. An old ruined church in the Ennistymon burial ground, although more recent, most likely marks the location of the abbey. Luchtigern resigned the apostleship of Ennistymon to Saint Mainchín. Luchtigern was also connected with Corcomroe Abbey, and seems to have had authority over all of Thomond or North Munster.

Luchtigern is mentioned in the life of Saint Mac Creiche, who died in 541. At this time Luchtigern was connected with Ennistymon and Corcomroe. He accompanied MacCreiche to Carn Mic Táil to give advice to the Corca Modruadh and Tuadhmhumhain people over a tribute of cattle that the king of Connaught was demanding. Luchtigern's main church would have been at Tuam Fionnlocha in the barony of Upper Bunratty. Tuamfinlough is the oldest known settlement in the region of Newmarket-on-Fergus. He is commemorated in the Feast of St. Luchtigern on 29 April, the date when he became abbot of Tuam Fionnlocha.

== Legends ==
=== Visit to Saint Íte ===
Luchtigern was one of the friends of Saint Íte, a contemporary of Saint Brigid of Kildare. It is recorded that Luchtigern and Saint Laisren were travelling to visit Íte with a young monk, who called them "stupid and foolish" to visit the old hag. The abbots reproved the monk, suspecting that Íte would have heard his words. Their fears were justified. Íte greeted them by asking why they had come to visit an old hag. The young monk was forced to do penance before the visit could proceed.

=== Plague stone ===
A traditional story tells of Luchtigern curing a woman inflicted by the plague, who came to him when he was working in the field at Tomfinlough with two deacons. One of the deacons was greatly impressed, and attributed the cure to God working through the saint. The other was skeptical. Luchtigern carved three faces on a stone, representing himself and the deacons, and said that heaven would show who was right. Soon the face of the skeptic was worn away, while the other two faces remained. The "plague stone" with its three bosses, one flat and two round, is part of the Tomfinlough graveyard wall, and may be seen today.

== Sources ==
- Archdall, Mervyn (1873). Monasticon Hibernicum: or, An history of the abbeys, priories, and other religious houses in Ireland, ed. by P.F. Moran.
- Bitel, Lisa M. (1996). Land of Women: Tales of Sex and Gender from Early Ireland. Cornell University Press. ISBN 0-8014-8544-4.
- FitzPatrick, Elizabeth (2004). Royal Inauguration in Gaelic Ireland C. 1100-1600: A Cultural Landscape Study. Boydell Press. ISBN 978-1-84383-090-0.
- Frost, James (1893). The History and Topography of the County of Clare: From the Earliest Times to the Beginning of the 18th Century. author. p. 191.
- Lanigan, John (1822). An Ecclesiastical History of Ireland, from the First Introduction of Christianity Among the Irish, to the Beginning of the Thirteenth Century. Graisberry. p. 28.
- "Newmarket-on-Fergus: Historical Background". Clare County Library.
- Schulenburg, Jane Tibbetts (January 1998). Forgetful of Their Sex: Female Sanctity and Society, Ca. 500-1100. University of Chicago Press. p. 324. ISBN 978-0-226-74054-6.
- Smith, William; Wace, Henry (1882). A Dictionary of Christian Biography, Literature, Sects and Doctrines: Being a Continuation of "The Dictionary of the Bible". J. Murray. p. 744.
- Westropp, Thomas Johnson (2014). "County Clare Folk-Tales and Myths". Clare Library.
