= Ardsollus and Quin railway station =

Railway station in Ireland

Ardsollus and Quin Ard Solus
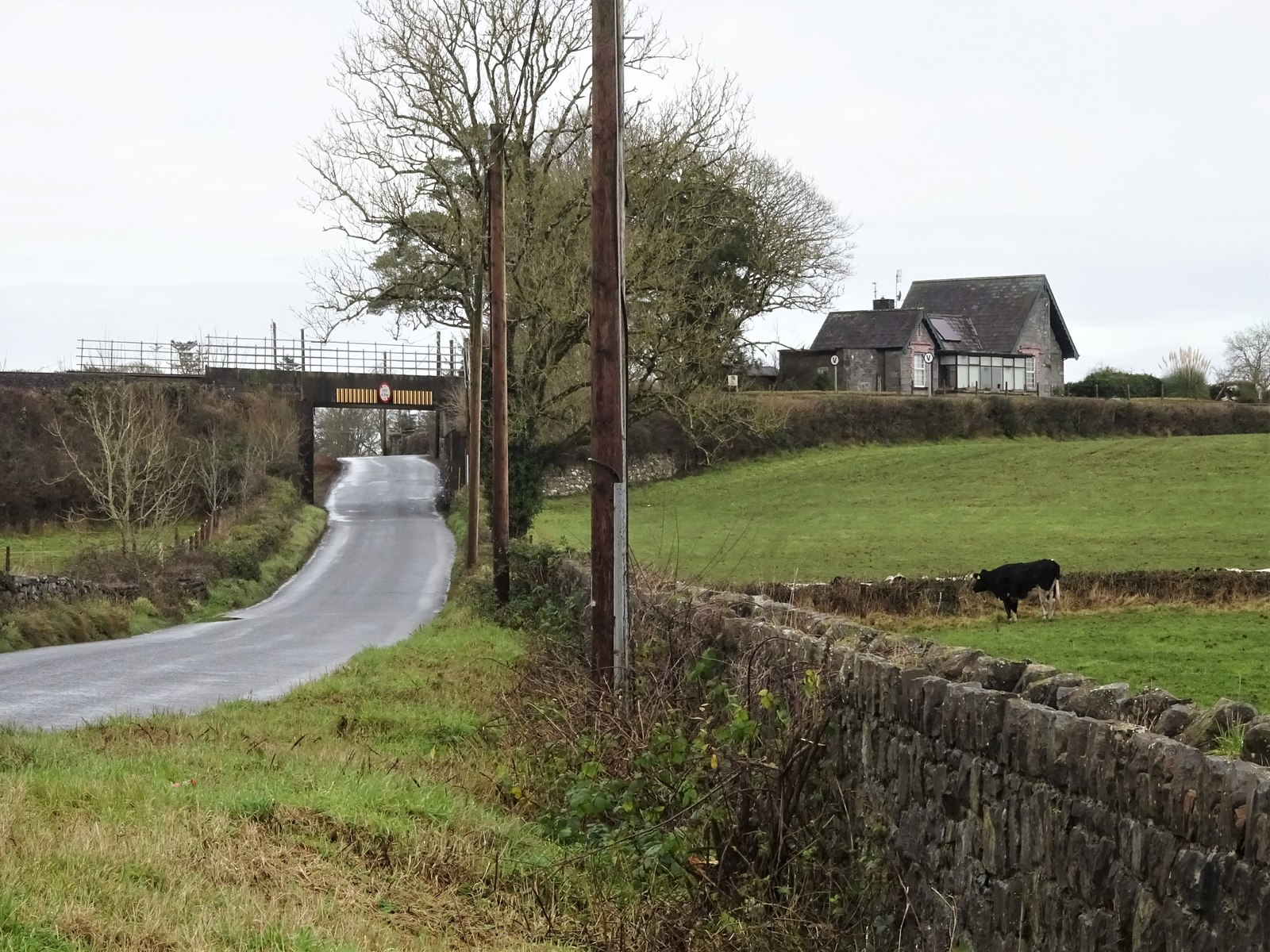
- Site of the station

General information
- Location: Ardsallis; Ennis, County Clare; Ireland
- Coordinates: 52.8049°N 8.8874°W

History
- Opened: 17 January 1859
- Closed: 17 June 1963
- Original company: Waterford and Limerick Railway; Limerick and Ennis Railway
- Pre-grouping: Great Southern and Western Railway
- Post-grouping: Great Southern Railways

Services
Preceding station	Disused railways	Following station
Ballycar	Midland Great Western Railway; Limerick and Ennis Railway; Great Southern and Western Railway	Clarecastle
Location
- Location within Ireland

Ardsollus and Quin railway station, also spelled Ard Solus was a station on the railway from Limerick to Ennis and served the village of Quin in County Clare, Ireland.

== History ==
Opened by the Limerick and Ennis Railway, at the beginning of the 20th century, the station was run by the Great Southern and Western Railway (GSWR). It was absorbed by the Great Southern and Western Railway Company, and so joined the Great Southern Railways.

During the Irish Civil War, two anti-Treaty IRA members, were executed after being convicted of sabotaging Ard Solus station.

The station was then nationalised, passing on to the Córas Iompair Éireann as a result of the Transport Act 1944 which took effect from 1 January 1945. The passenger service ceased but freight traffic passed on to the Iarnród Éireann in 1986.
