= Shannon Development =

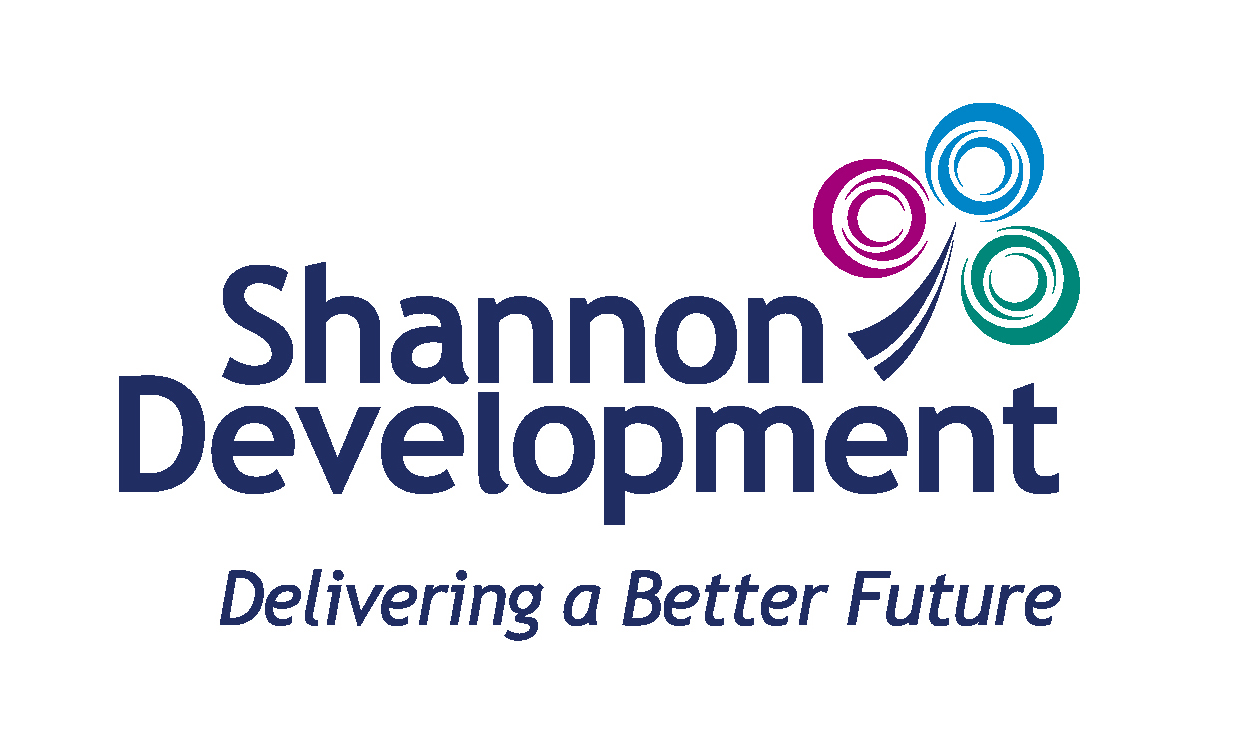

Former state agency of the Department of Jobs, Enterprise and Innovation overview
- Formed: 1959
- Dissolved: 10 November 2014
- Jurisdiction: Ireland
- Headquarters: Shannon Town Centre, Shannon, County Clare, Ireland
- Website: Shannon Development website

Shannon Development (legally the Shannon Free Airport Development Company Limited formerly known as SFADCO) was an important regional development body for the Shannon Region of Ireland. Its area in the lower River Shannon basin comprised all of counties Clare, Limerick, and the former North Tipperary, as well as north Kerry and west Offaly. Its key founder was Brendan O'Regan.

Shannon Development worked with, but was not an agency of, Forfás.

== Responsibility ==
Shannon Development was set up as Shannon Free Airport Development Company by the Irish Government in 1959 to promote the airport and region. Shannon Airport was built at a strategic point on the early transatlantic flying route, but with the age of the jet, its fortunes declined. In 1969 Aer Rianta took responsibility of the airport.

Shannon Development was responsible for a number of areas of development of the region including tourism and industry similar to IDA Ireland. The agency was responsible for Shannon Free Zone and National Technology Park on which the University of Limerick is located. Shannon Town was also created and managed by the company until it was transferred to Clare County Council in 2004. This property transfer was the biggest property transaction in the history of the state.

Shannon Development also acted as a landlord for many companies in the region. Companies that qualify, paid rent to Shannon Development. In return the company can apply for Enterprise Ireland grant funding through Shannon Development. This constitutes a symbiotic relationship.

The government reviewed the role of the agency in July 2005 and its functions are being realigned. Under the new arrangements, Shannon Development will have an enhanced regional economic development role with a particular emphasis on addressing the needs of the less developed parts of the Shannon region. It will also retain responsibility for the Shannon Free Zone industrial park. The existing enterprise support functions (carried out by Shannon Development in relation to both indigenous and overseas enterprises) will be assumed by the national agencies, Enterprise Ireland and IDA Ireland.

Shannon Development became part of Shannon Group plc on 10 November 2014. To emphasise a more commercially focused property remit, Shannon Development was renamed Shannon Commercial Enterprises Ltd, trading as Shannon Enterprises.

== Shannon Heritage ==
Shannon Heritage, a member of the group, is a semi-state commercial body responsible for operating tourist sites including the GPO, and Craggaunowen. In August 2019 Fingal County Council announced Shannon Heritage were to be appointed to run the Fry Model Railway when it re-opens in addition to Malahide Castle and Demesne which they already operate.

== See also ==
- Celtic Tiger
- Economy of the Republic of Ireland
