= Shannon Free Zone =

Free Trade Zone in Ireland

Coordinates: 52°42′18.93″N 8°53′58.24″W

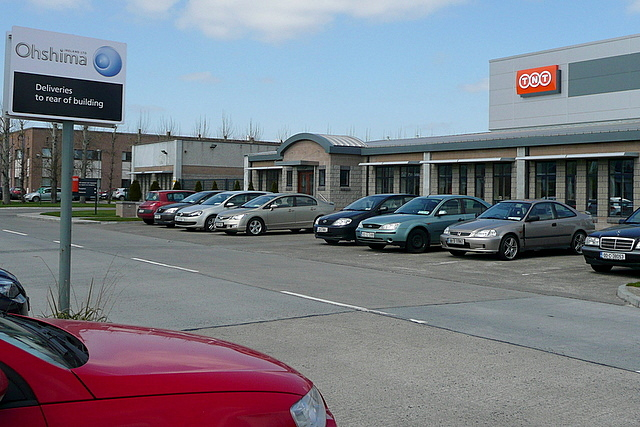
Businesses in the Shannon Free Zone (Shannon Industrial Estate)

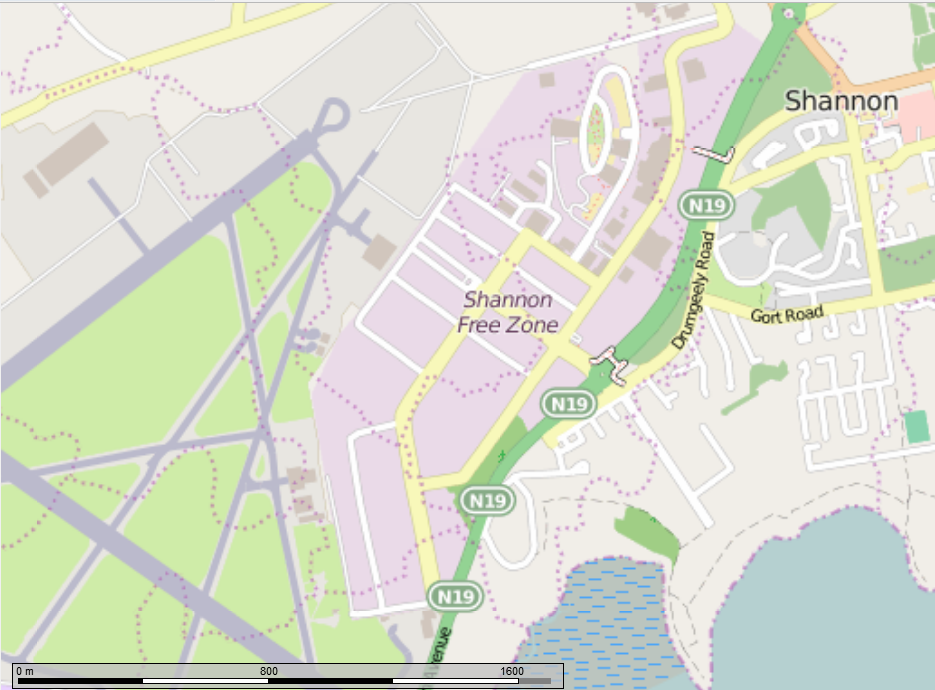
Map of the Shannon Free Zone

The Shannon Free Zone is a 2.43 square kilometres (600 acres), international business park adjacent to Shannon Airport, County Clare, in Ireland. It is 18 km from Ennis and 20 km from Limerick. It was established in 1959, as the world's first "modern" free-trade zone. Businesses based on the site enjoyed special tax incentives on staff and profits until 2003, which attracted a large number of multinational companies to the area.

== History ==
In the late 1950s, Shannon Airport was dependent on transit passengers and refuelling for trans-Atlantic flights. With indicators that commercial aircraft would soon have the range to bypass the airport, the airport's then director, Brendan O'Regan, submitted a proposal for a special manufacturing and tax incentive zone to be created in the vicinity of the airport. This would create employment and promote Shannon Airport as a destination for air traffic in itself. The site adjacent to the airport was established in 1959, with a second zone, Smithstown, following a number of years later.

The Shannon Free Zone was intended to attract investment in exchange for tax incentives and tariff reductions. It succeeded in attracting foreign investment. While many of these incentives have since ceased, as of 2019, there were reportedly more than 100 international firms employing more than 8000 people based at the Shannon Free Zone. Companies who have invested at Shannon have included Element Six (formerly DeBeers Industrial Diamonds), GECAS, GE Sensing, Intel, Lufthansa Technik, Zimmer and UCB.

Until 2014, the Shannon Free Zone was managed by Shannon Development, an Irish government agency. As of 2020, it is managed by Shannon Commercial Properties, a commercial semi-state company and part of Shannon Group plc.

Shannon Free Trade Zone has been an example that influenced China's Special Economic Zones, and it has been visited by Chinese leaders including Jiang Zemin (in 1980) and later Wen Jiabao and Xi Jinping.
