= Shannon, County Clare =

Town in County Clare, Ireland

Shannon Irish: Sionainn
- Town
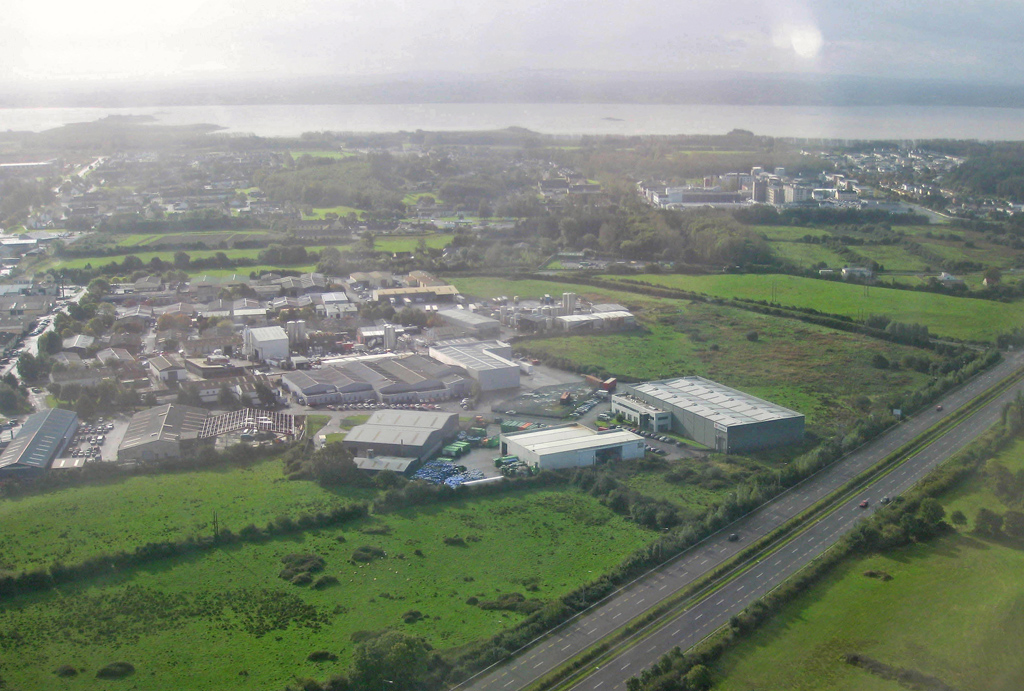
- View over Shannon, with the industrial area on the left and the housing on the right

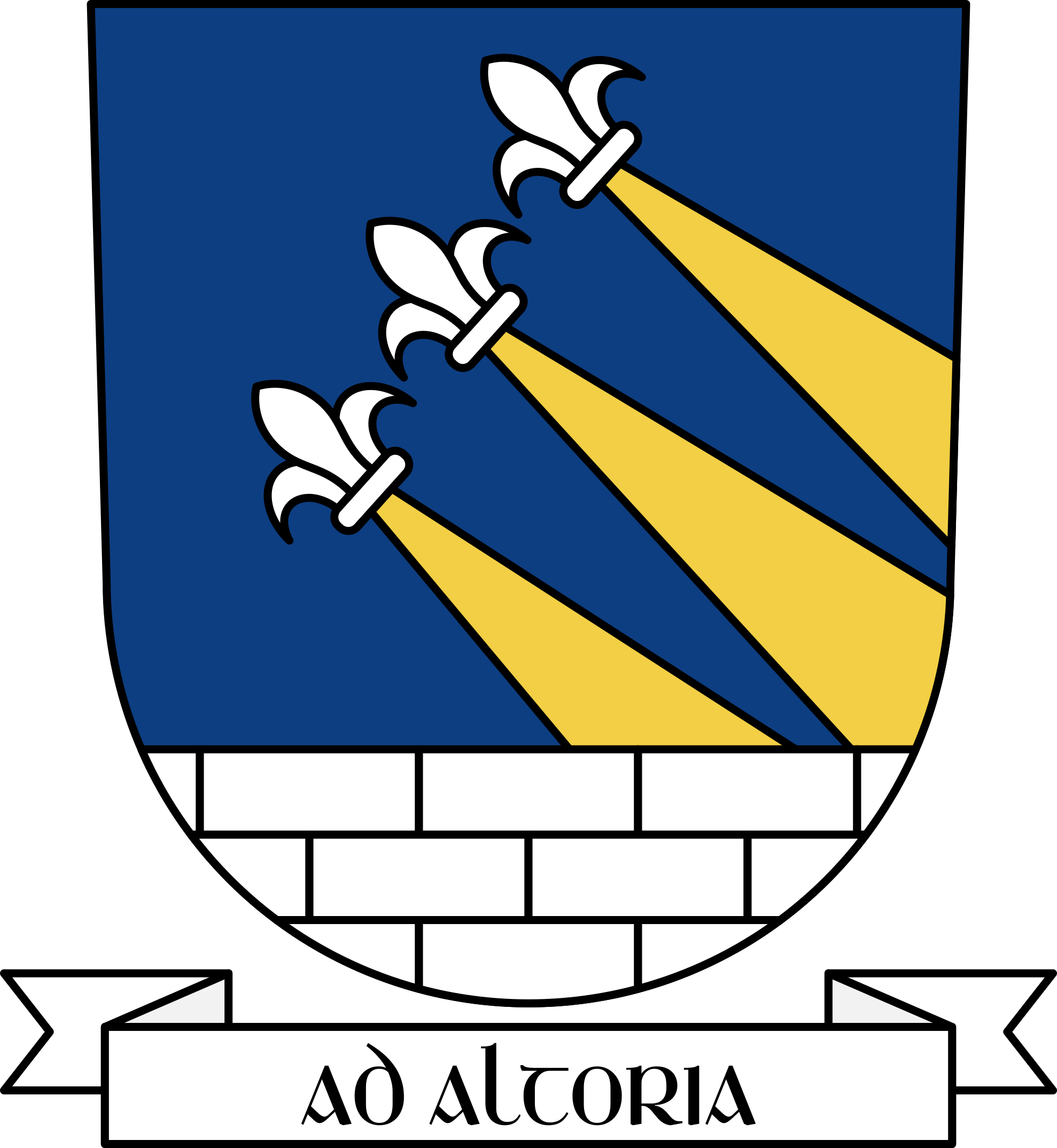
- Coat of arms

- Location in Ireland
- Coordinates: 52.713731°N 8.868628°W
- Country: Ireland
- Province: Munster
- County: County Clare
- Dáil constituency: Clare
- EU Parliament: South

Population (2022)
  - Total: 10,256
- Time zone: UTC±0 (WET)
  - Summer (DST): UTC+1 (IST)
- Eircode routing key: V14
- Telephone area code: 061
- Irish Grid Reference: R402624
- Website: www.shannon.ie

Historical population
Year	Pop.	±%
1841	241	—
1851	196	−18.7%
1861	156	−20.4%
1871	147	−5.8%
1881	95	−35.4%
1961	234	+146.3%
1966	1,658	+608.5%
1971	3,657	+120.6%
1981	7,998	+118.7%
1986	8,005	+0.1%
1991	7,920	−1.1%
1996	7,940	+0.3%
2002	8,561	+7.8%
2006	9,222	+7.7%
2011	9,673	+4.9%
2016	9,729	+0.6%
2022	10,256	+5.4%

Shannon (Irish: Sionainn) or Shannon Town (Baile na Sionnainne) is a town in County Clare, Ireland. It was given town status on 1 January 1982. The town is named after the nearby River Shannon. It is located just off the N19 road, a spur of the N18/M18 road between Limerick and Ennis. It is the location of Shannon Airport, an international airport serving the Clare/Limerick region in the west of Ireland, as well as being the location of one of the two bases of Shanwick Oceanic Control which oversees transatlantic air traffic control over the western portion of the North Atlantic Ocean.

It has a population of 10,256 as per the 2022 census, the second largest town in the county.

== History ==
Shannon is a new town. Spearheaded by Brendan O'Regan, it was built in the 1960s on reclaimed marshland alongside Shannon Airport, along with the Shannon Free Zone Industrial Park. The residential areas were intended as a home for the thousands of workers at the airport, surrounding industries and support services. Population growth was never as fast as planned throughout the first few decades of the town's existence.

Shannon was originally located in the parish of Newmarket-on-Fergus in the Roman Catholic Diocese of Killaloe, and at first a priest in residence of the airport served the population. In 1966 St. Senan's School was opened and Mary Immaculate Church was built on Corrib Drive. On 24 December 1967 the parish of Shannon was created. For a short period a group of Dominican Sisters of England had a community in the parish. In 1974 they were replaced by the Sisters of Mercy. The church of Saints John and Paul was opened in Tullyvarraga in 1980. Other churches are the Adoration Chapel in Shannon Town Centre and the Shannon Airport Oratory. The Church of Ireland community is served by the Drumcliffe Union and the Methodist community is served by a lay pastor. Shannon is also home of Christian evangelical churches, Shannon Christian Church and New Life Christian Church.

St. John's Church of Ireland School was the first school established in Shannon in 1962. Christ Church Shannon opened in 1962, also serving members of the reformed faiths, but it is now closed.

Shannon was the manufacturing base of GAC Ireland, which built almost all buses for CIÉ during its short existence between 1980 and 1986.

== Development ==
The population grew in the 1990s, and new modern housing developments were built. Improvements to facilities in the town included the opening of a second major supermarket, Lidl, with the shopping centre being expanded by the addition of the "Skycourt" complex.

The main road through Shannon was remodelled following the opening of the bypass of Newmarket-on-Fergus. New units continued to open in the industrial estates.

== Education ==
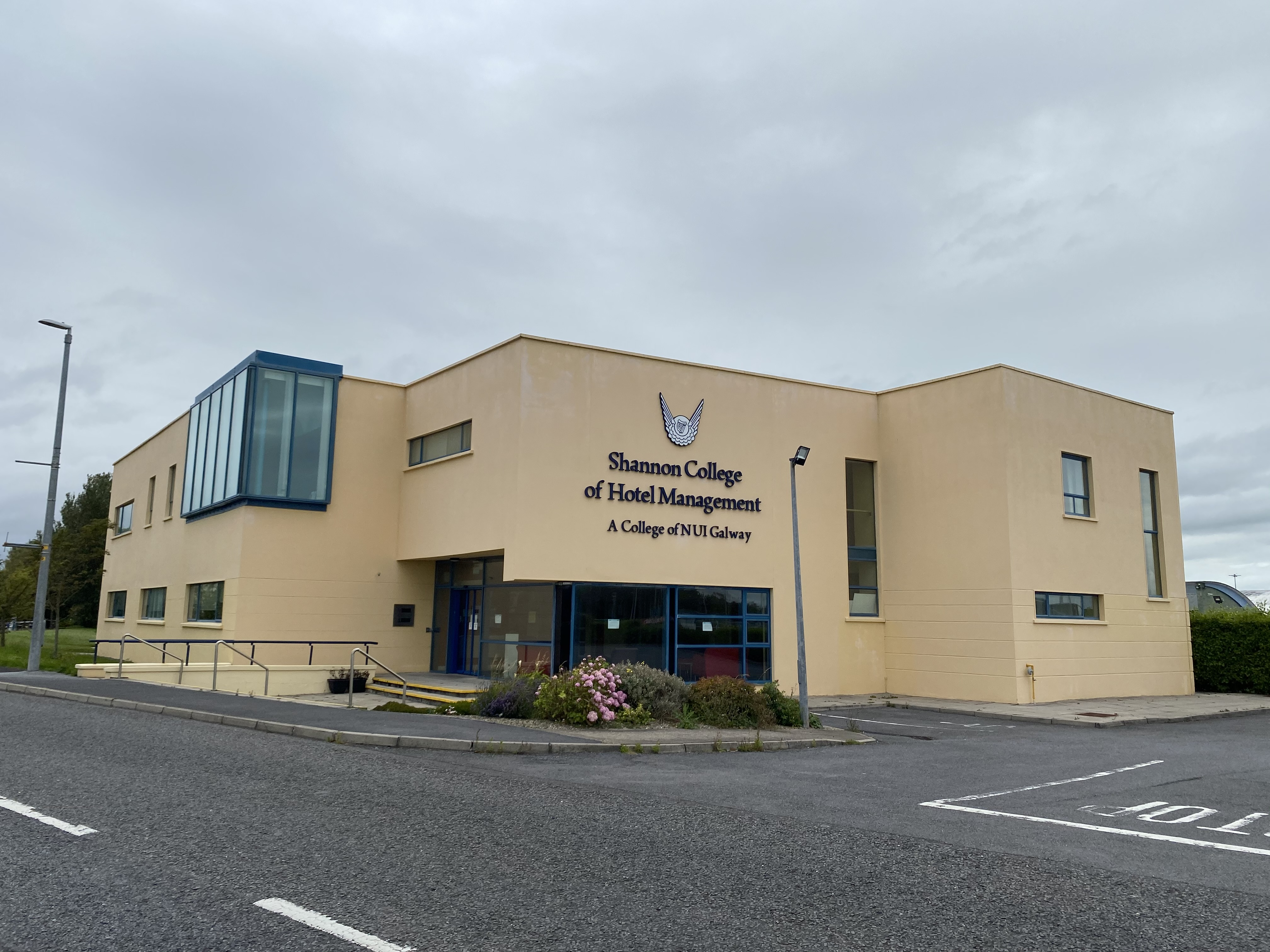
Shannon College of Hotel Management

Shannon town has six primary schools: St. Tola's, St John's, St Senan's, Gaelscoil Donnacha Rua, St. Conaire's (largest primary school) and St. Aidan's, including a Gaelscoil (Gaelscoil Donncha Rua) and a school under the patronage of Church of Ireland (St. Johns NS).

There are two second-level education institutes in the town, St. Patrick's Comprehensive School and St. Caimin's Community School. St. Patrick's Comprehensive School opened in 1966 as Ireland's first comprehensive school. It has been serving the town since and has been extended since 2016 to increase its capacity to over 900 pupils.

There is one third level institution in Shannon: the Shannon College of Hotel Management, which opened in 1951. Since 2015 it has been an official college of the University of Galway.

== Community Facilities ==
Shannon supports a broad range of community, sporting, cultural, and social facilities serving its population of approximately 10,000 people.

=== Sports and leisure ===
==== Shannon Swimming and Leisure Centre ====
The Shannon Swimming and Leisure Centre, located at Bóthar Linne, Tullyglass, is the primary sports and fitness facility in the town. Established in 1975, it celebrated its fiftieth anniversary in 2025. Facilities include a 25-metre indoor swimming pool, sauna and steam room, cardio and resistance fitness suite, strength and conditioning gym, three large sports halls, an indoor climbing wall, two FIFA-rated all-weather astroturf pitches, a skate park, the Tír na nÓg children's playground, and a café. The centre offers swimming lessons, fitness classes, summer camps, and school tours, and its halls are available for hire by community groups and sports clubs.

==== Wolfe Tones na Sionna GAA Club ====
Wolfe Tones na Sionna CLG was founded in 1967 as Shannon's first GAA club, initially under the name Shannon Airport GAA and Athletic Club. The first games were played in an open field at Ballymurtagh; in 1972, permanent grounds, a clubhouse, a function hall, and dressing rooms were opened, quickly establishing the club as a central social hub for the rapidly growing town. The club operates under the one-club model, fielding teams in hurling, football, camogie, and ladies football across all age groups. The club reached the All-Ireland Senior Club Hurling Championship final in 1997.

==== St Senans RFC ====
St Senans Rugby Football Club was formally founded in 1974, though the roots of the club lie in the early 1960s when junior rugby was played in Shannon through the Estates Cup, a competition organised between factories in the Shannon Industrial Estate. As interest grew in the wider community, a founding meeting was held in 1974 at the Crossroads Pub in Drumgeely. The club's first president was Cyril Kiely and its first captain was Eamon Dooley. Affiliation to the Irish Rugby Football Union (IRFU) was secured with the support of Young Munsters and Garryowen, who proposed and seconded the application. The club's home ground is Jimmy Slattery Park and it fields teams from mini rugby (under-8s) through to adult men's level. St Senans is a junior club affiliated to the Munster Branch of the IRFU.

=== Community halls ===
==== Tullyvarraga Hall ====
Tullyvarraga Hall is a multi-purpose community hall located in the Tullyvarraga area of Shannon, managed by Clare County Council under its rural and community development remit. The hall has served a variety of community functions over the decades, including hosting St. Aidan's National School from its foundation in September 1982 until the school's permanent building in Smithstown was completed in 1987. The hall continues to serve the local community for sports, classes, and events.

=== Library services ===
==== Seán Lemass Public Library ====
The Seán Lemass Public Library is Shannon's public library, located in Shannon Town Centre in the Tullyvarraga area. It is operated by Clare County Council's library service as part of the Clare Libraries network. The library provides public internet access, reading areas, public toilets, and charging facilities, and participates in the wider Clare Libraries programme of events, community outreach, and digital services.

=== Social and community services ===
==== Shannon Family Resource Centre ====
Shannon Family Resource Centre (FRC) was established in 2001 and is located in the Respond Community Building at Rineanna View, Ballycasey More. It is a registered charity (CHY 15115) funded primarily by Tusla — the Child and Family Agency — and forms part of the national Family Resource Centre programme. The centre provides services described as covering "cradle to grave" needs, including counselling, community education programmes delivered in partnership with the Limerick and Clare Education and Training Board (LCETB), a homework club, the Seniors Alert Scheme, and an after-school club. It employs six staff and relies on local volunteers.

==== Shannon Community Partnership ====
Shannon Community Partnership is a voluntary body that coordinates community development across the town, maintaining a directory of local groups and services and facilitating the Shannon Community Network. It acts as a signposting and coordination body, connecting residents with the range of organisations active in Shannon.

== Economy ==
Shannon Free Zone is Ireland's largest cluster of North American investments. Since its establishment in 1959, more than 110 overseas companies have chosen to open subsidiaries in Shannon. Major companies in Shannon include Jaguar Land Rover, Zimmer Biomet, Element Six, Symantec, AXA Partners, Lufthansa Technik, Mentor Graphics, RSA Security, GE Capital, Ingersoll Rand, Intel and Digital River. Eirjet's head office was located on the grounds of Shannon Airport.

== Local government and politics ==
The town is administered at a local level by Clare County Council. In 1982, the town was granted local government under town commissioners. In 2002, this body became a town council. In 2008, the administrative boundary of the town was extended. In 2014, in common with all town councils in Ireland, it was abolished and its functions were transferred to the county council.

2009 Shannon Town Council election
Party	Seats	Change
Fine Gael	4	+2
Labour Party	2	=
Independent	3	-1
Sinn Féin	0	-
Fianna Fáil	0	-2

In addition, prior to September 2004, Shannon Development, a state-sponsored body had charge of many services normally provided by local authorities in Ireland. This gave Shannon a unique status in local governance. In September 2004 its situation was regularised when Shannon Development transferred its local government functions to Clare County Council. The company retains responsibility for the Shannon Free Zone.

== Climate ==
Climate in this area has mild differences between highs and lows, and there is adequate rainfall year-round. The Köppen Climate Classification subtype for this climate is "Cfb" (Marine West Coast Climate/Oceanic climate). The highest temperature ever recorded in Shannon was 32.0 °C (89.6 °F) on 28 June 2018.

Climate data for Shannon Airport (SNN) (1991-2020 normals, extremes 1938-present)
Month	Jan	Feb	Mar	Apr	May	Jun	Jul	Aug	Sep	Oct	Nov	Dec	Year
Record high °C (°F)	14.8 (58.6)	15.5 (59.9)	20.2 (68.4)	25.0 (77.0)	30.6 (87.1)	32.0 (89.6)	30.8 (87.4)	30.0 (86.0)	27.9 (82.2)	23.0 (73.4)	18.2 (64.8)	16.2 (61.2)	32.0 (89.6)
Mean daily maximum °C (°F)	8.9 (48.0)	9.4 (48.9)	10.9 (51.6)	13.4 (56.1)	16.0 (60.8)	18.3 (64.9)	19.5 (67.1)	19.1 (66.4)	17.5 (63.5)	14.2 (57.6)	11.1 (52.0)	9.2 (48.6)	14.0 (57.2)
Daily mean °C (°F)	6.1 (43.0)	6.3 (43.3)	7.5 (45.5)	9.6 (49.3)	12.0 (53.6)	14.5 (58.1)	16.0 (60.8)	15.8 (60.4)	14.1 (57.4)	11.2 (52.2)	8.3 (46.9)	6.4 (43.5)	10.7 (51.3)
Mean daily minimum °C (°F)	3.3 (37.9)	3.3 (37.9)	4.0 (39.2)	5.8 (42.4)	8.1 (46.6)	10.8 (51.4)	12.6 (54.7)	12.4 (54.3)	10.7 (51.3)	8.1 (46.6)	5.5 (41.9)	3.7 (38.7)	7.4 (45.3)
Record low °C (°F)	−11.9 (10.6)	−9.8 (14.4)	−7.8 (18.0)	−4.6 (23.7)	−1.7 (28.9)	0.9 (33.6)	4.4 (39.9)	2.8 (37.0)	−0.6 (30.9)	−3.3 (26.1)	−7.2 (19.0)	−11.4 (11.5)	−11.9 (10.6)
Average precipitation mm (inches)	103.8 (4.09)	86.7 (3.41)	75.8 (2.98)	62.3 (2.45)	63.1 (2.48)	69.6 (2.74)	75.8 (2.98)	87.6 (3.45)	77.4 (3.05)	95.5 (3.76)	106.6 (4.20)	115.4 (4.54)	1,019.7 (40.15)
Average precipitation days (≥ 1.0 mm)	16.9	13.9	13.4	11.4	12.1	11.3	13.5	13.7	12.9	15.4	16.8	17.2	168.5
Average snowy days	1.5	1.8	1.2	0.3	0.0	0.0	0.0	0.0	0.0	0.0	0.1	1.0	5.9
Average relative humidity (%)	85.8	83.7	80.5	77.2	76.1	76.7	79.8	80.7	82.1	84.2	86.8	86.9	81.7
Average dew point °C (°F)	4.1 (39.4)	3.9 (39.0)	4.3 (39.7)	5.5 (41.9)	7.8 (46.0)	10.2 (50.4)	12.3 (54.1)	12.3 (54.1)	10.9 (51.6)	8.6 (47.5)	6.4 (43.5)	4.6 (40.3)	7.6 (45.7)
Mean monthly sunshine hours	52.3	68.9	111.1	162.3	182.5	164.5	134.9	142.5	118.1	93.4	61.8	46.2	1,338.5
Source 1: Met Éireann
Source 2: NOAA Servizio Meteorologico (extremes)

== Twin towns – sister cities ==
Shannon is twinned with:

- Guingamp, France, since 1991

== Notable people ==
- Patrick Cassidy, orchestral, choral, and film score composer
- Pat Cox, President of the European Parliament, 2002-2004, journalist and television current affairs presenter
- Rachael English, author and broadcaster
- Ger Loughnane, senior hurler, manager of the Clare team and sports commentator, worked as a teacher in Shannon and lived in the Coill Mhara area for some decades

== See also ==
- List of towns and villages in Ireland
