= Mooghaun =

Mooghaun Múchán
- Hillfort
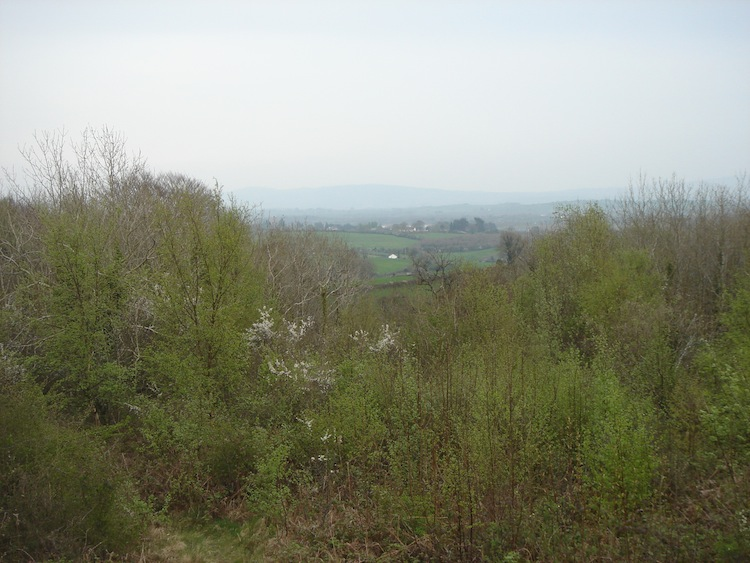

- Location Newmarket on Fergus Ireland
- Coordinates: 52°46′59″N 8°52′44″W
- Country: Ireland
- Province: Munster
- County: County Clare
- Elevation: 70 m (230 ft)
- Irish Grid Reference: R408705

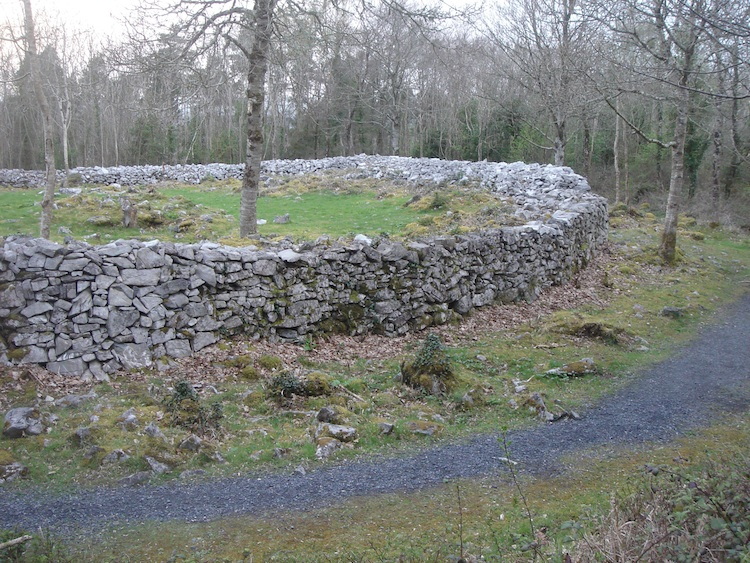
The cashel in the middle rampart

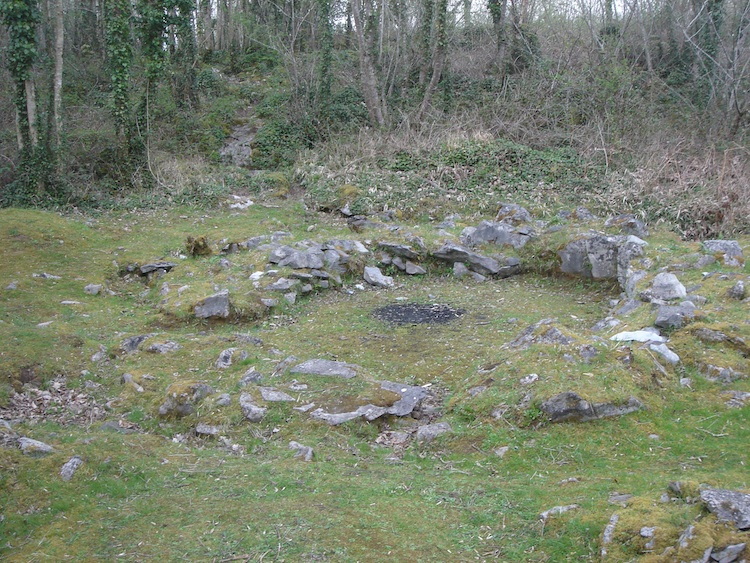
Foundations of a round house

Mooghaun (Irish: Múchán) is a late Bronze Age hill fort located in County Clare, Ireland. It is a well preserved, recently excavated site, occupying an entire hill with wide views of the surrounding lands. Believed to be the largest hill fort in Ireland, it is one of the region's main tourist attractions.

== Location and physical description ==
Mooghaun is situated in the parish of Mooghaun South, 3 kilometres (1.9 mi) north north-east of Newmarket on Fergus, on the grounds of Dromoland Castle.

It has three concentric limestone ramparts of defence, all built at the same time. The outermost wall encloses 27.18 acres (11.00 ha), the middle one 7.41 acres (3.00 ha), and the innermost 2.04 acres (0.83 ha). It occupies the summit of a hill with views, nowadays largely obscured by trees, of the chiefdom it controlled. The grounds also hold a number of cashels which are of later date.

== History ==
The hill fort was built at the beginning of the late Bronze Age, around 950 BC. At the time, Mooghaun was the largest and most important site in the area. It holds three cashels, which were built after 500 AD. For the construction of the defending walls, stones of the original ramparts were used. Beside the cashels, outlines of round houses were found.

Perhaps 10 or 12 families lived within the bounds of the hill fort. These families tended to farm land within the enclosure and also kept livestock there. They lived mainly in the middle enclosure.

The people who directed its construction were the leaders over a chiefdom in south-east Clare that covered an area of about 450 square kilometres (170 sq mi). The chiefdom is considered to have been bordered by the Shannon estuary to the south, and mountain ranges to the north, east and west. Their territory was divided into smaller territories of about 25 square kilometres (9.7 sq mi), which were controlled by important families. These lived in smaller defended hilltop sites and lake settlements. The less important families lived in settlements that were enclosed by low stone banks. These often occurred in clusters, each farming an area of about 154 to 315 hectares (381 to 778 acres).

The site of the cashels was used in the late eighteenth or early nineteenth century by the inhabitants of the nearby Dromoland estate as a viewing point or even a picnic spot. To facilitate this use, much of the interior was destroyed and repairs were made to the walls.

== Mooghaun North Hoard ==
A very large hoard of Late Bronze Age gold jewellery was discovered in the neighbouring parish of Mooghaun North in 1854, during construction of a railway from Limerick to Ennis. It appears to have numbered several hundred objects, but most were sold to jewellers and melted down, though many replicas were made. Only 29 originals survive, divided between the National Museum of Ireland and the British Museum. Most objects were plain gold hoops in various sizes, from bracelets (the majority) to torcs, with some wide gold collars also. There were some ingots. The find was near Mooghaun Lough and was probably a ritual deposit, which must have represented a huge amount of wealth at the time.
