= Clonloghan =

Clonloghan Cluain Lócháin
- Civil parish
- Location in Ireland
- Coordinates: 52°43′N 8°53′W
- Country: Ireland
- Province: Munster
- County: County Clare
- Time zone: UTC+0 (WET)
  - Summer (DST): UTC-1 (IST (WEST))

Clonloghan (Irish: Cluain Lócháin) is a civil parish of County Clare, Ireland, located 21.7 kilometres (13.5 mi) by road northwest of Limerick, just north of Shannon.

== Geography ==
The civil parish of Clonloghan lies in the barony of Bunratty Lower. It is in the southern part of the county and is bordered by Kilnasoolagh to the northwest, Tomfinlough to the northeast, Drumline to the east, Kilmaleery to the west and Kilconry to the southwest. It is divided into 14 townlands:

- Ballinooskny
- Ballymurtagh
- Caherteige
- Clonloghan
- Drumgeely
- Killulla
- Knockaun
- Leamaneigh Beg
- Leamaneigh More
- Lisconor
- Lislea
- Lismacleane
- Tullyglass
- Tullyvarraga
