= Shannon College of Hotel Management =

Irish college

- Coláiste Ósta na Sionna
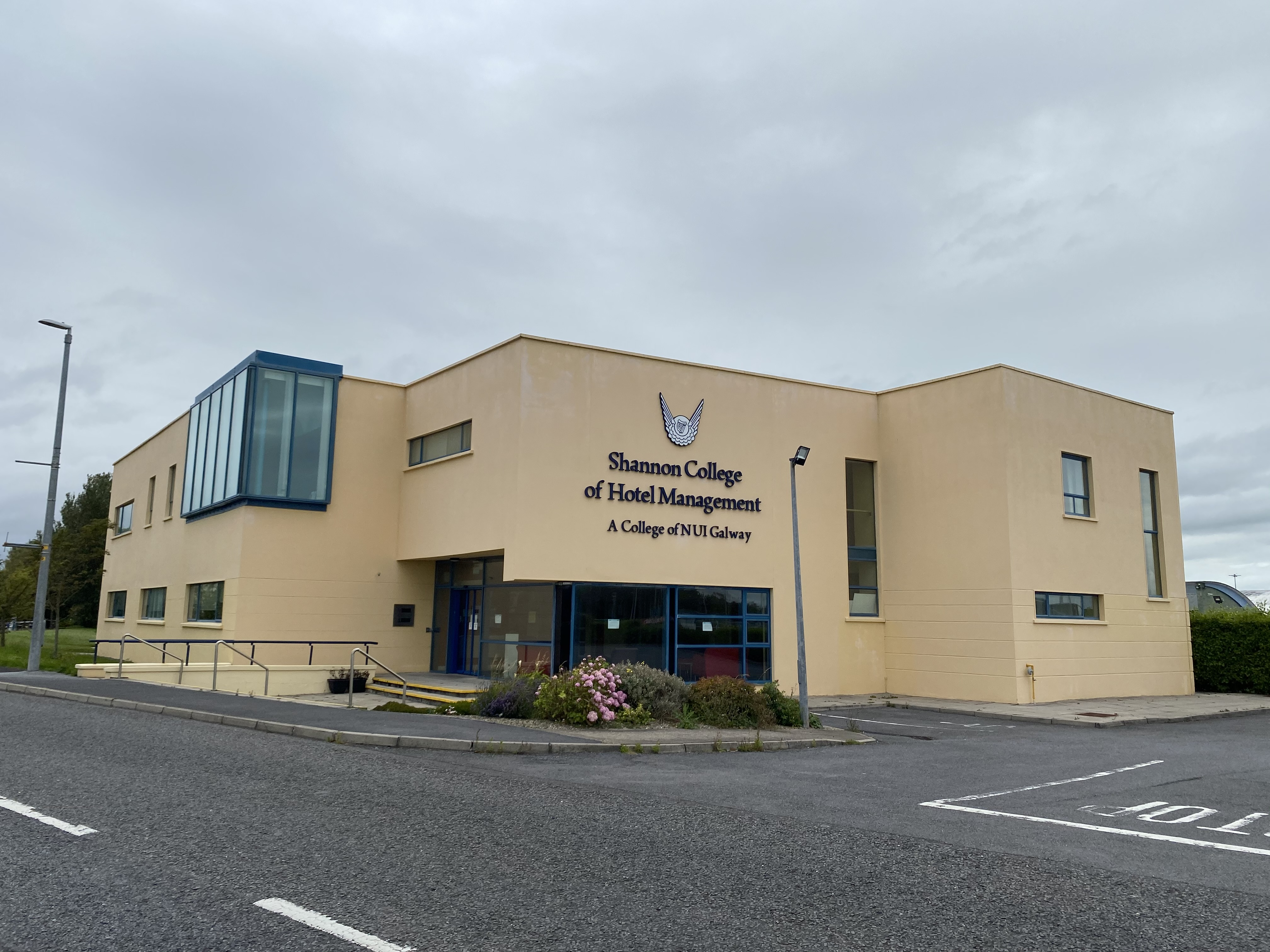
- Type: Public
- Established: 1951
- Founder: Brendan O'Regan
- Affiliations: NUI (2000–present); University of Galway; NCEA (1993–2001)
- President: Adrian Sylver
- Vice-president: Tracey Hegarty
- Director: Adrian Sylver
- Administrative staff: 27
- Students: 397
- Location: Shannon, County Clare, Ireland
- Website: shannoncollege.com

Shannon College of Hotel Management was founded in 1951 as Ireland's first designated college of hotel management. Since 2015 it is fully incorporated into the University of Galway. The college was founded by Brendan O'Regan and is based in Shannon Airport, County Clare. It was set up with input from Aer Rianta. Shannon College offers programmes at foundation, certificate, degree and masters level. Shannon College also offers executive education and short programmes. Graduates of Shannon College are also recognised by the Institute of Hospitality (IoH), the International Hotel and Restaurant Association and the Irish Hospitality Institute.

== History ==
The college was founded in 1951 as Ireland's first designated college of hotel management. From 1951 until 1991, the college offered a diploma in hotel management. In 1991, the college began its relationship with University College Galway which saw Shannon offer the BComm in Hotel Management. In 1993, the diploma was validated by NCEA (forerunner of HETAC). In 2000, the college became a recognised college of the National University of Ireland.

In 1991, the process of integrating the college into the University of Galway was first mooted. It commenced in 2004 and developed additional urgency since Shannon Airport was made independent of Aer Rianta and Dublin Airport. From 2009, Shannon was involved in an alliance with the University of Galway, and since 2015 is fully incorporated into the university. Shannon College of Hotel Management is now part of the College of Business, Public Policy and Law of the University of Galway. This integration was formally marked by the Minister for Education Jan O'Sullivan at an event held in Shannon College on 9 November 2015. All staff of Shannon College of Hotel Management are now staff of the University of Galway and all students of Shannon College of Hotel Management are students of the University of Galway.

Students from the college won the Irish Hospitality Institute Business Management Games in April 2012.

== Courses ==
Students of the BComm in International Hotel Management spend three years at the Shannon College of Hotel Management Campus and the fourth year at the University of Galway campus.

Since 2010 Graduates of the BBS degree programme are entitled to exemptions for ACCA accountancy exams.

Graduation takes place each year in Spring.
