= Kilconry =

Kilconry Cill Chomhraí
- Civil parish
- Location in Ireland
- Coordinates: 52°42′22″N 8°56′8″W
- Country: Ireland
- Province: Munster
- County: County Clare
- Time zone: UTC+0 (WET)
  - Summer (DST): UTC-1 (IST (WEST))

Kilconry (Irish: Cill Chomhraí) is a civil parish of County Clare, Ireland, located about 25 kilometres (16 mi) northwest of Limerick, west of Shannon on the estuary of the River Shannon. The main village in the area is Ballycalla/Ballcally and it contains the Shannon Golf Club and Shannon Airport.

== Geography ==
The civil parish of Kilconry lies in the barony of Bunratty Lower. It is in the southern part of the county and is bordered by Kilmaleery to the north and Clonloghan to the east and the River Shannon to the south and west. It is divided into 9 townlands:

- Ballycally
- Ballyhennessy
- Carrigerry
- Feenish
- Garrynamona
- Inishmacnaghtan
- Rineanna North
- Rineanna South
- Stonehall

== See also ==
- List of townlands of County Clare
