= Kilmaleery =

Civil parish in County Clare, Ireland

Kilmaleery Cill Mhaoilfhithrigh
- Civil parish
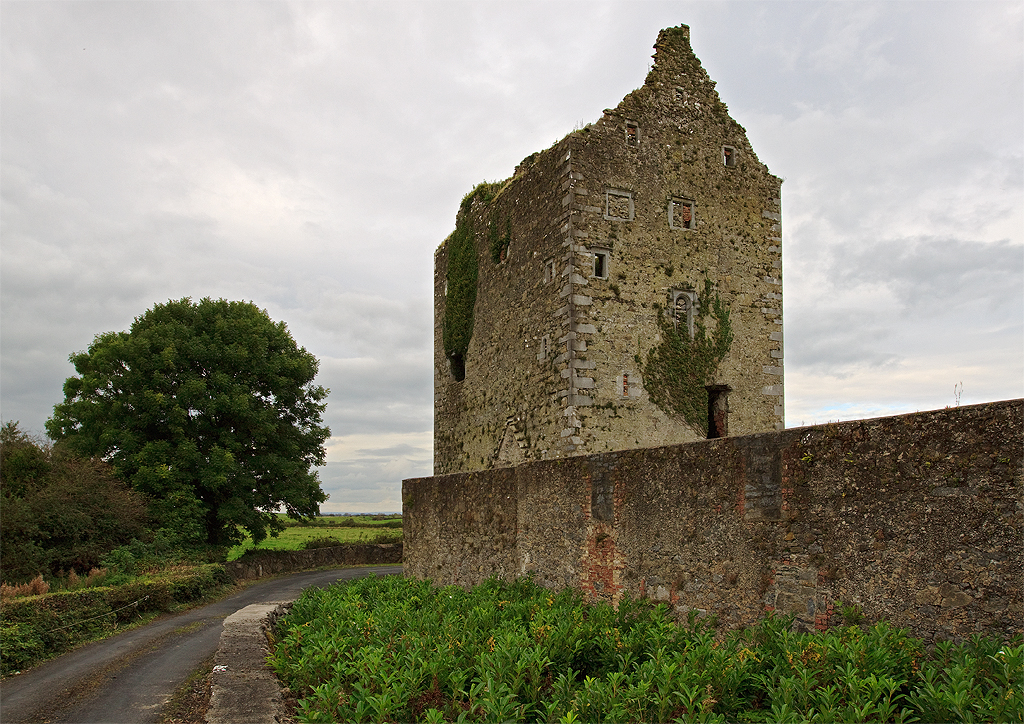
- Clenagh Castle

- Location within Ireland
- Coordinates: 52°44′00″N 8°56′23″W
- Country: Ireland
- Province: Munster
- County: County Clare
- Time zone: UTC+0 (WET)
  - Summer (DST): UTC-1 (IST (WEST))

Kilmaleery (Irish: Cill Mhaoilfhithrigh) is a civil parish in County Clare, Ireland. It is part of the Catholic parish of Newmarket-on-Fergus.

== Location ==
The parish lies on the western border of the barony of Bunratty Lower. It is 1.5 miles (2.4 km) southwest of Newmarket, County Clare. The parish is 2.75 by 1.75 miles (4.43 by 2.82 km) and covers 2,266 acres (917 ha). It forms part of the eastern seaboard of the River Fergus estuary, and generally is good farmland.

== Antiquities and history ==
The name of the parish implies an ecclesiastical origin, but nothing is known of the patron saint. As of 1897 the church was very dilapidated. There is one holy well, Tobar Mailiaraidh, and a lios or small ringfort called Knockadoon. As of 1837 the parish was part of the Catholic union of Newmarket, and had a chapel at Carrigeary. In 1841 the population was 737 in 104 houses.

There were three castle, very well preserved in 1897. In 1580 Urlan was inhabited by Murtagh MacClancy and Bodavoher was the property of Donagh MacClancy. Clenagh is not mentioned in list of the Castles of Thomond for that year. Clenagh Castle, still almost intact, was a high square tower that was once the residence of the MacMahons.

== Townlands ==
The townlands are Ballinooskny, Ballymacnevin, Breckinish, Carrow, Carrowbane, Clenagh, Islandmacnevin, Kilmaleery, Urlan Beg, Urlan More and Ing.
