= 1993 Tipperary county hurling team season =

Tipperary county hurling team
1993 season
| Manager | Babs Keating |
| All-Ireland SHC | Semi-final |
| Munster SHC | Winners |
| National League | Semi-final |
- Top scorer
- Highest SHC attendance
- Lowest SHC attendance
Standard colours

In 1993 Tipperary competed in the National Hurling League and the Munster and All-Ireland Championship's.

It was Babs Keating's seventh year in charge of the team with Michael O'Meara named as team captain. The team were sponsored by National Irish Bank which appeared on the jerseys. In the Munster championship, Tipperary won the title for the 35th time after a 3–27 to 2–12 win against Clare in the final. In the All-Ireland championship, Tipperary lost in the semi-finals to Galway by 1–16 to 1–14.

== National Hurling League ==
| 25 October 1992 | Tipperary | 0-15 - 1-10 | Limerick | Semple Stadium, Thurles |
| | M Cleary 0-8, Dinny Ryan 0-3, N English 0-2, J Leahy 0-1, D Ryan 0-1. | | G Kirby 0-6, D Flynn 1-0, A Garvey 0-2, PJ Garvey 0-1, M Houlihan 0-1. | Referee: J Guinan (Kilkenny) |

| 15 November 1992 | Kilkenny | 1-9 - 1-10 | Tipperary | Nowlan Park, Kilkenny |
| | R Heffernan 1-1, A Prendergast 0-4, PJ Delaney 0-2, J Brennan 0-1, J Power 0-1. | | M Cleary 1-8, A Ryan 0-1, J Leahy 0-1. |

| 22 November 1992 | Tipperary | 1-15 - 0-7 | Offaly | Semple Stadium, Thurles |
| | M Cleary 1-4, D Ryan 0-3, J Hayes 0-3, S Bohan 0-2, D Carr 0-2, P King 0-1. | | Johnny Dooley 0-3, P Corrigan 0-3, Joe Dooley 0-1. | Referee: JM Kelly (Waterford) |

| 7 March 1993 | Down | 2-5 - 0-14 | Tipperary | McKenna Park, Ballycran |
| | N Sands 1-0, P Savage 1-0, G McGrattan 0-2, C Mageean 0-1, M Baillie 0-1, D Hughes 0-1. | | C Stakelum 0-6, M Cleary 0-6, M O'Meara 0-1, N English 0-1. | Referee: P Ahearne (Carlow) |

| 21 March 1993 | Tipperary | 1-17 - 2-10 | Antrim | Semple Stadium, Thurles |
| | C Stakelum 1-10, S Bohan 0-2, A Ryan 0-2, N English 0-2, Conal Bonnar 0-1. | | JP McKillop 2-3, P McKillen 0-3, P Jennings 0-2, J Carson 0-1, G O'Kane 0-1. | Referee: D Murphy (Wexford) |

| 11 April 1993 Quarter-final | Kerry | 0-5 - 0-14 | Tipperary | FitzGerald Stadium, Killarney |
| | S Sheehan 0-1, M McKivergan 0-1, J Dunphy 0-1, C Walsh 0-1, DJ Leahy 0-1. | | C Stakelum 0-5, P Fox 0-4, D Ryan 0-2, M Cleary 0-2, N English 0-1. |

| 25 April 1993 Semi-final | Tipperary | 1-13 - 2-11 | Cork | Semple Stadium, Thurles |
| | M Cleary 0-4, C Stakelum 0-4, C Bonnar 1-0, T Dunne 0-2, N English 0-1, P Fox 0-1, D Ryan 0-1. | | B Egan 0-4, T Mulcahy 1-0, G Manley 1-0, C Casey 0-3, T McCarthy 0-2, P Buckley 0-1, S McCarthy 0-1. | Attendance: 35,000; Referee: P Delaney (Laois) |

== 1993 Munster Senior Hurling Championship ==
June 6, 1993
Semi-Final

| Tipperary | 4-21 – 2-9 | Kerry |
|---|---|---|
| M. Cleary (3-2), C. Stakelum (1-2), D. Ryan (0-3), J. Leahy (0-3), A. Ryan (0-3), A. Crosse (0-3), T. Dunne (0-2), Colm Bonnar (0-2), D. Carr (0-1). | Report | T. Maunsell (2-0), D. J. Leahy (0-3), B. Mahony (0-3), L. O'Connor (0-1), J. Walsh (0-1), S. Sheehan (0-1). |

Semple Stadium, Thurles
Attendance: 11,303
Referee: T. Murray (Limerick)
July 4, 1993
Final

| Tipperary | 3-27 – 2-12 | Clare |
|---|---|---|
| M. Cleary (1-4), J. Leahy (1-4), A. Crosse (1-4), A. Ryan (0-5), P. Fox (0-3), N. English (0-3), D. Ryan (0-3), Colm Bonnar (0-1). | | C. Lyons (1-1), J. O'Connor (0-4), J. McInerney (1-0), J. Chaplin (0-2), F. Tuohy (0-2), G. O'Loughlin (0-1), J. O'Connell (0-1), P. Markham (0-1). |

Gaelic Grounds, Limerick
Attendance: 41,557
Referee: T. Murray (Limerick)

== 1993 All-Ireland Senior Hurling Championship ==
August 8, 1993
Semi-Final

| Galway | 1-16 – 1-14 | Tipperary |
|---|---|---|
| J. Cooney (0-5), M. McGrath (1-1), J. McGrath (0-4), J. Rabbitte (0-2), L. Burke (0-2), P. Kelly (0-1), B. Keogh (0-1). | Highlights | M. Cleary (0-8), P. Fox (1-0), D. Carr (0-1), D. Ryan (0-1), J. Leahy (0-1), A. Ryan (0-1), A. Crosse (0-1), N. English (0-1). |

Croke Park, Dublin
Attendance: 43,257
Referee: D. Murphy (Wexford)

== Awards ==
Tipperary won one All Star Award with forward Michael Cleary picking up his fourth award.
