= Tipperary county hurling team results (1990–1999) =

This article contains the results of the Tipperary county hurling team in the Championship during the 1990s.

Tipperary played 27 Championship games during the decade, winning 14, losing 10, and drawing 3. They won 2 Munster titles in 1991 and 1993 and won 1 All Ireland title in 1991.

== 1990 ==
10 June
Semi-Final

Limerick	1-17 – 2-20	Tipperary
G. Kirby (0-8), M. Galligan (1-0), S. Fitzgibbon (0-3), C. Carey (0-2), T. Kenny (0-2), D. Flynn (0-1), M. Reale (0-1).		D. Ryan (1-4), N. English (0-7), D. Ryan (1-0), M. Cleary (0-3), J. Leahy (0-2), P. Fox (0-1), P. Delaney (0-1), D. Carr (0-1), J. Hayes (0-1).

Gaelic Grounds, Limerick
Attendance: 34,402
Referee: W. Horgan (Cork)

16 July
Final

Tipperary	2-14 – 4-16	Cork
M. Cleary (1-5), N. English (1-4), C. Stakelum (0-2), J. Leahy (0-2), D. Ryan (0-1).	Highlights	M. Foley (2-7), J. Fitzgibbon (2-0), T. O'Sullivan (0-5), C. Casey (0-1), G. FitzGerald (0-1), K. Hennessy (0-1), D. Quirke (0-1).

Semple Stadium, Thurles
Attendance: 49,782
Referee: J. Moore (Waterford)

== 1991 ==
9 June
Semi-Final

Tipperary	2-18 – 0-10	Limerick
N. English (1-2), M. Cleary (0-5), Cormac Bonnar (1-1), P. Fox (0-4), D. Ryan (0-3), J. Leahy (0-3).	Highlights	G. Kirby (0-5), M. Galligan (0-1), G. Ryan (0-1), D. Nash (0-1), A. Carmody (0-1), F. Carroll (0-1).

Semple Stadium, Thurles
Attendance: 35,000
Referee: J. Moore (Waterford)

7 July
Final

Cork	4-10 – 2-16	Tipperary
G. FitzGerald (2-0), K. Hennessy (1-2), J. Fitzgibbon (1-2), T. O'Sullivan (0-3), C. Casey (0-2), P. Buckley (0-1).	Highlights	M. Cleary (0-8), P. Fox (1-3), J. Leahy (1-1), Cormac Bonnar (0-1), N. English (0-1), A. Ryan (0-1), D. Ryan (0-1).

Páirc Uí Chaoimh, Cork
Attendance: 46,695
Referee: T. Murray (Limerick)

20 July
Final
Replay

Tipperary	4-19 – 4-15	Cork
M. Cleary (1-7), P. Fox (1-5), A. Ryan (1-1), D. Carr (1-1), D. Ryan (0-2), J. Leahy (0-2), Cormac Bonnar (0-1).	Highlights	J. Fitzgibbon (2-1), T. O'Sullivan (0-6), G. FitzGerald (1-2), K. Hennessy (1-0), J. Cashman (0-3), T. Mulcahy (0-1), P. Buckley (0-1), C. Casey (0-1).

Semple Stadium, Thurles
Attendance: 55,000
Referee: T. Murray (Limerick)

4 August
Semi-Final

Tipperary	3-13 – 1-9	Galway
M. Cleary (1-9), D. Ryan (1-0), Cormac Bonna (1-0), C. Stakelum (0-2), J. Leahy (0-1), D. Carr (0-1).	Full Match	M. McGrath (1-1), J. Cooney (0-4), J. Rabbitte (0-1). B. Keogh (0-1), R. Duane (0-1), M. Naughton (0-1).

Croke Park, Dublin
Attendance: 60,976
Referee: D. Murphy (Wexford)

1 September
Final
15:30 UTC+1

Tipperary	1-16 – 0-15	Kilkenny
M. Cleary (1-6), P. Fox (0-5), A. Ryan (0-2), D. Ryan (0-1), J. Leahy (0-1), B. Ryan (0-1).	Full Match	D. J. Carey (0-9), É. Morrissey (0-3), L. Fennelly (0-1), L. McCarthy (0-1), R. Power (0-1).

Croke Park, Dublin
Attendance: 64,500
Referee: W. Horgan (Cork)

== 1992 ==
7 June
Semi-Final

Cork	2-12 – 1-12	Tipperary
T. O'Sullivan (0-7), J. Fitzgibbon (1-1), T. Mulcahy (1-0), B. Corcoran (0-2), G. FitzGerald (0-1), K. Hennessy (0-1).		D. Ryan (1-1), M. Cleary (0-3), C. Stakelum (0-3), P. Fox (0-2), A. Ryan (0-2), D. Carr (0-1).

Páirc Uí Chaoimh, Cork
Attendance: 42,416
Referee: K. Walsh (Clare)

== 1993 ==
6 June
Semi-Final

Tipperary	4-21 – 2-9	Kerry
M. Cleary (3-2), C. Stakelum (1-2), D. Ryan (0-3), J. Leahy (0-3), A. Ryan (0-3), A. Crosse (0-3), T. Dunne (0-2), Colm Bonnar (0-2), D. Carr (0-1).		T. Maunsell (2-0), D. J. Leahy (0-3), B. Mahony (0-3), L. O'Connor (0-1), J. Walsh (0-1), S. Sheehan (0-1).

Semple Stadium, Thurles
Attendance: 11,303
Referee: T. Murray (Limerick)

4 July
Final

Tipperary	3-27 – 2-12	Clare
M. Cleary (1-4), J. Leahy (1-4), A. Crosse (1-4), A. Ryan (0-5), P. Fox (0-3), N. English (0-3), D. Ryan (0-3), Colm Bonnar (0-1).	Full Match	C. Lyons (1-1), J. O'Connor (0-4), J. McInerney (1-0), J. Chaplin (0-2), F. Tuohy (0-2), G. O'Loughlin (0-1), J. O'Connell (0-1), P. Markham (0-1).

Gaelic Grounds, Limerick
Attendance: 41,557
Referee: T. Murray (Limerick)

8 August
Semi-Final

Galway	1-16 – 1-14	Tipperary
J. Cooney (0-5), M. McGrath (1-1), J. McGrath (0-4), J. Rabbitte (0-2), L. Burke (0-2), P. Kelly (0-1), B. Keogh (0-1).	Full Match	M. Cleary (0-8), P. Fox (1-0), D. Carr (0-1), D. Ryan (0-1), J. Leahy (0-1), A. Ryan (0-1), A. Crosse (0-1), N. English (0-1).

Croke Park, Dublin
Attendance: 43,257
Referee: D. Murphy (Wexford)

== 1994 ==
29 May
Quarter-Final

Clare	2-11 – 0-13	Tipperary
J. O'Connor (0-7), T. Guilfoyle (2-0), J. McInerney (0-1), P. J. O'Connell (0-1), F. Tuohy (0-1), G. O'Loughlin (0-1).	Highlights	M. Cleary (0-9), D. Ryan (0-1), A. Crosse (0-1), A. Ryan (0-1), P. Fox (0-1).

Gaelic Grounds, Limerick
Referee: W. Horgan (Cork)

== 1995 ==
21 May
Quarter-Final

Tipperary	4-23 – 1-11	Waterford
P. Fox (2-4), M. Cleary (1-4), A. Ryan (1-2), N. English (0-4), D. Ryan (0-4), T. Dunne (0-3), J. Leahy (0-2).		G. Harris (1-1), P. Flynn (0-3), G. Gater (0-3), T. Browne (0-1), T. Fives (0-1), B. O'Sullivan (0-1), P. Queally (0-1).

Páirc Uí Chaoimh, Cork
Referee: T. Murray (Limerick)

18 June
Semi-Final

Limerick	0-16 – 0-15	Tipperary
G. Kirby (0-12), M. Galligan (0-1), T. J. Ryan (0-1), D. Quigley (0-1), S. O'Neill (0-1).		M. Cleary (0-4), B. Ryan (0-2), A. Ryan (0-2), N. English (0-2), J. Leahy (0-2), P. Fox (0-1), A. Crosse (0-1), D. Ryan (0-1).

Páirc Uí Chaoimh, Cork
Attendance: 32,134
Referee: D. Murphy (Wexford)

== 1996 ==
2 June
Quarter-Final

Waterford	1–11 – 1–14	Tipperary
P. Flynn (1–5), J. Brenner (0–3), T. Fives (0–1), P. Queally (0–1), K. McGrath (0–1).		L. Cahill (1–2), M. Cleary (0–4), T. Dunne (0–4), N. English (0–2), L. McGrath (0–1), J. Leahy (0–1).

Walsh Park, Waterford
Attendance: 15,655
Referee: D. Murphy (Wexford)

15 June
Semi-Final

Kerry	2–11 – 4–19	Tipperary
Jerry O'Sullivan (1–2), M. McKivergan (1–0), M. Hennessy (0–3), C. Walsh (0–3), P. O'Connell (0–1), C. Ross (0–1), L. O'Connor (0–1).		J. Leahy (2–2), L. Cahill (1–4), T. Dunne (1–3), M. Kennedy (0–3), M. Cleary (0–3), D. Ryan (0–1), P. Fox (0–1), A. Butler (0–1), N. English (0–1).

Austin Stack Park, Tralee
Attendance: 4,300
Referee: J. O'Leary (Cork)

7 July
Final

Limerick	0–19 – 1–16	Tipperary
G. Kirby (0–10), T. J. Ryan (0–3), F. Carroll (0–2), M. Galligan (0–1), O. O'Neill (0–1), C. Carey (0–1), Seán O'Neill (0–1).	Full Game	L. Cahill (1–3), M. Cleary (0–4), D. Ryan (0–2), T. Dunne (0–2), J. Leahy (0–2), K. Tucker (0–1). N. English (0–1), L. McGrath (0–1).

Gaelic Grounds, Limerick
Attendance: 43,525
Referee: J. O'Leary (Cork)

14 July
Final Replay

Limerick	4–7 – 0–16	Tipperary
O. O'Neill (2–0), F. Carroll (1–1), T. J. Ryan (1–1), D. Quigley (0–2), B. Foley (0–1). C. Carey (0–1), G. Kirby (0–1).		M. Cleary (0–7), D. Ryan (0–4), N. English (0–3), L. McGrath (0–1), L. Cahill (0–1).

Páirc Uí Chaoimh, Cork
Attendance: 40,000
Referee: J. O'Leary (Cork)

== 1997 ==
15 June
Semi-Final

Tipperary	1-20 – 0-13	Limerick
M. Cleary (1-3), T. Dunne (0-5), K. Tucker (0-3), D. Ryan (0-3), J. Leahy (0-3), L. Cahill (0-2), P. O'Dwyer (0-1).	Second-half	G. Kirby (0-4), M. Houlihan (0-2), M. Galligan (0-2), D. Clerkin (0-1), M. Foley (0-1), J. Moran (0-1), B. Foley (0-1), T. J. Ryan (0-1).

Semple Stadium, Thurles
Attendance: 49,165
Referee: D. Murphy (Wexford)

6 July
Final

Clare	1-18 – 0-18	Tipperary
J. O'Connor (0-5), D. Forde (1-1), G. O'Loughlin (0-3), S. McMahon (0-3), P. J. O'Connell (0-2), C. Lynch (0-1), F. Tuohy (0-1), S. McNamara (0-1), B. Murphy (0-1).	Report; Full Match	T. Dunne (0-7), D. Ryan (0-4), K. Tucker (0-3), J. Leahy (0-3), M. Cleary (0-1).

Páirc Uí Chaoimh, Cork
Attendance: 43,560
Referee: P. O'Connor (Limerick)

26 July
Quarter-Final

Tipperary	3-24 – 3-8	Down
J. Leahy (0-8), A. Ryan (1-2), T. Dunne (0-5), A. Flanagan (1-1), E. O'Neill (1-0), L. McGrath (0-3), B. O'Meara (0-3), L. Cahill (0-1), K. Tucker (0-1).	Highlights	N. Sands (1-4), G. McGrattan (1-1), B. Coulter (1-0), G. Savage (0-2), M. Braniff (0-1).

St. Tiernach's Park, Clones
Attendance: 5,726
Referee: D. Murphy (Wexford)

17 August
Semi-Final

Tipperary	2-16 – 0-15	Wexford
J. Leahy (1-4), B. O'Meara (1-1), T. Dunne (0-4), M. Cleary (0-3), D. Ryan (0-1), L. Cahill (0-1), C. Gleeson (0-1), L. McGrath (0-1).	Highlights	P. Codd (0-8), M. Storey (0-3), T. Dempsey (0-1), M. Jordan (0-1), L. Murphy (0-1), L. Dunne (0-1).

Croke Park, Dublin
Attendance: 62,142
Referee: J. O'Leary (Cork)

14 September
Final

Clare	0-20 – 2-13	Tipperary
J. O'Connor (0-7), N. Gilligan (0-3), O. Baker (0-2), C. Lynch (0-2), D. Forde (0-2), S. McMahon (0-1), G. O'Loughlin (0-1), C. Clancy (0-1), L. Doyle (0-1).	Full Match	T. Dunne (0-5), E. O'Neill (1-1), J. Leahy (0-4), L. Cahill (1-0), M. Cleary (0-1), C. Gleeson (0-1), B. O'Meara (0-1).

Croke Park, Dublin
Attendance: 65,575
Referee: D. Murphy (Wexford)

== 1998 ==
7 June
Semi-Final

Waterford	0-21 – 2-12	Tipperary
P. Flynn (0-10), K. McGrath (0-4), T. Browne (0-2), D. Shanahan (0-2), B. O'Sullivan (0-2), A. Kirwan (0-1).	Report; Full Match	E. O'Neill (1-3), B. O'Meara (1-0), L. Cahill (0-3), T. Dunne (0-2), L. McGrath (0-1), D. Ryan (0-1), J. Leahy (0-1), M. Kennedy (0-1).

Páirc Uí Chaoimh, Cork
Attendance: 30,532
Referee: P. O'Connor (Limerick)

== 1999 ==
1999-05-22
Quarter-final

Tipperary	4-29 – 2-6	Kerry
P. Shelley 2-2; T. Dunne 0-7 (0-4 frees); J. Leahy 0-6 (0-2 frees); L. Cahill, D. Ryan 1-2 each; P. Kelly 0-4; B. O'Meara 0-3; C. Gleeson 0-2; E. Enright 0-1.	(report)	P. Cronin, B. O'Sullivan 1-0 each; M. Slattery 0-3 (frees); T. Maunsell 0-3.

Semple Stadium, Thurles
Referee: E. Morris (Dublin).

1999-06-06
Semi-final

Clare	2-12 – 0-18	Tipperary
J. O'Connor 1-2 (0-2 frees); D. Fitzgerald 1-0 penalty; D. Forde 0-3; N. Gilligan 0-2; A. Markham, S. McMahon, C. Lynch, B. Murphy and C. Clancy 0-1 each.	(report)	T. Dunne 0-7 (0-3 frees, 0-2 7 seventies); L. Cahill 0-3; P. Shelley 0-2; J. Leahy, E. Enright, B. O'Meara, E. Tucker, D. Ryan and P. Kelly 0-1 each.

Páirc Uí Chaoimh, Cork
Referee: D. Murphy (Wexford).

1999-06-12
Semi-final
Replay

Clare	1-21 – 1-11	Tipperary
A. Markham 1-3; S. McMahon 0-6 (0-5 frees); C. Lynch 0-4; B. Murphy 0-3; D. Forde 0-2 frees; J. O'Connor (free), O. Baker and E. Flannery 0-1 each.	(report)	T. Dunne 0-10 (0-9 from frees); D. Ryan 1-0 free; E. Enright 0-1.

Páirc Uí Chaoimh, Cork
Referee: D. Murphy (Wexford).
