= 1994 All-Ireland Senior Hurling Championship =

Championship details
- Dates: 1 May – 3 September 1994
- Teams: 19

All-Ireland champions
- Winning team: Offaly (3rd win)
- Captain: Martin Hanamy
- Manager: Éamonn Cregan

All-Ireland Finalists
- Losing team: Limerick
- Captain: Gary Kirby
- Manager: Tom Ryan

Provincial champions
- Munster: Limerick
- Leinster: Offaly
- Ulster: Antrim
- Connacht: Not Played

Championship statistics
- No. matches played: 19
- Top Scorer: Gary Kirby (4–33)
- Player of the Year: Brian Whelahan
- All-Star Team: See here

The All-Ireland Senior Hurling Championship of 1994 was the 108th staging of Ireland's premier hurling knock-out competition. Offaly won the championship, beating Limerick 3–16 to 2–13 in a sensational final at Croke Park, Dublin.

== Pre-championship ==
Prior to the opening of the championship Kilkenny were installed as the favourites to retain the All-Ireland title for a third consecutive year. The last time they achieved this was in 1913, however, no final took place that year and Kilkenny were awarded the title as Limerick refused to play. Since then they failed to capture the 'three-in-a-row', in spite of having the opportunity in 1933, 1976 and 1984. National League champions Tipperary and runners-up Galway were regarded as the two teams that would provide the strongest challenges to Kilkenny's supremacy. Cork at 4/1, regarded as a team in decline, and Wexford at 6/1 formed the next grouping of teams who hoped to claim the All-Ireland crown. Offaly, a team who claimed three Leinster titles in succession in the late 1980s but failed to reach the All-Ireland final, were regarded as outsiders at 16/1. Antrim, Down, Limerick and Dublin were rank outsiders at 25/1 each.

== Team changes ==
=== To Championship ===
Promoted from the All-Ireland Senior B Hurling Championship

- Roscommon (qualified)
- Westmeath
- Wicklow

=== From Championship ===
Regraded to the All-Ireland Senior B Hurling Championship

- None

== The Championship ==
=== Participating counties ===
Province	County	Most recent success	
Province	County	All-Ireland	Provincial
Leinster	Dublin	1938	1961
	Carlow		
	Kilkenny	1993	1993
	Laois	1915	1949
	Meath		
	Offaly	1985	1990
	Westmeath		1937
	Wexford	1968	1977
	Wicklow		
Munster	Clare	1914	1932
	Cork	1990	1992
	Kerry	1891	1891
	Limerick	1973	1981
	Tipperary	1991	1993
	Waterford	1959	1963
Connacht	Galway	1988	1922
Ulster	Antrim		1993
	Down		1992

=== Format ===
==== Munster Championship ====
Quarter-final: (2 matches) These are two lone matches between the first four teams drawn from the province of Munster. Two teams are eliminated at this stage, while two teams advance to the next round.

Semi-finals: (2 matches) The winners of the two quarter-finals join the other two Munster teams to make up the semi-final pairings. Two teams are eliminated at this stage, while two teams advance to the next round.

Final: (1 match) The winners of the two semi-finals contest this game. One team is eliminated at this stage, while the winners advance to the All-Ireland semi-final.

==== Leinster Championship ====
First round: (2 matches) These are two lone matches between two 'weaker' teams drawn from the province of Leinster. Two teams are eliminated at this stage, while two teams advance to the next round.

Second Round: (1 match) The winners of the first round play each other in a lone second-round game. One team is eliminated at this stage, while the winners advance to the Leinster quarter-final.

Quarter-finals: (2 matches) The winner of the second-round game joins three other Leinster teams to make up the two quarter-final pairings. Two teams are eliminated at this stage, while two teams advance to the Leinster semi-finals.

Semi-finals: (2 matches) The winners of the two quarter-finals join two other Leinster teams to make up the semi-final pairings. Two teams are eliminated at this stage, while two teams advance to the Leinster final.

Final: (1 match) The winners of the two semi-finals contest this game. One team is eliminated at this stage, while the winners advance to the All-Ireland semi-final.

==== Ulster Championship ====
Final: (1 match) This is a lone match between the two competing Ulster teams. One team is eliminated at this stage, while the winners advance to the All-Ireland semi-final.

==== All-Ireland Championship ====
Quarter-final: (1 match) This is a lone match between Galway and the All-Ireland 'B' champions. One team is eliminated at this stage, while the winners advance to the All-Ireland semi-final where they play the Leinster champions.

Semi-finals: (2 matches) The Munster and Leinster champions will play the winners of the lone quarter-final and the Ulster champions. The Munster and Leinster winners will be in opposite semi-finals. Two teams are eliminated at this stage, while the two winners advance to the All-Ireland final.

Final: (1 match) The two semi-final winners will contest the All-Ireland final.

== Leinster Senior Hurling Championship ==
May 1
First Round

Meath	3–10 – 1–8	Westmeath
P. Potterton (1–5), C. Sheridan (1–2), J. Andrews (1–0), D. Martin (0–2), M. Cole (0–1).		D. Kilcoyne (0–5), S. McLoughlin (1–0), C. Murtagh (0–1), M. O'Farrell (0–1), S. Qualter (0–1).

St. Loman's Park, Trim

May 1
First Round

Carlow	4–16 – 1–10	Wicklow
D. Doyle (2–6), B. Hayden (1–6), M. Farrell (0–1), B. Lawlor (0–1), J. McDonald (0–1).		J. Keogh (0–6), N. Cremin (1–0), D. Hyland (0–3), T. Mulroe (0–1).

Dr. Cullen Park, Carlow

May 15
Second Round

Carlow	1–10 – 1–12	Meath
D. Doyle (1–2), J. McDonald (0–5), D. Murphy (0–1), P. Hayden (0–1), B. Lawlor (0–1).		P. Potterton (0–5), R. Kelly-Lynch (1–0), J. Andrews (0–3), M. Cole (0–1), C. Sheridan (0–1), M. Smith (0–1).

Dr. Cullen Park, Carlow
Attendance: 1,500
Referee: M. Sheridan (Kildare)

June 5
Quarter-Final

Wexford	3–13 – 2–16	Dublin
P. Finn (2–3), A. Fenlon (0–5), L. Murphy (1–1), M. Storey (0–3), J. O'Connor (0–1).		J. Twomey (1–5), S. McDermott (1–1), A. O'Grady (0–3), P. Tobin (0–2), S. Dalton (0–1), C. McCann (0–1), R. Boland (0–1), J. Murphy (0–1), C. Barr (0–1).

Nowlan Park, Kilkenny
Referee: S. O'Meara (Offaly)

June 5
Quarter-Final

Kilkenny	1–19 – 1–8	Meath
D. Gaffney (1–5), D. J. Carey (0–7), L. McCarthy (0–2), P. O'Neill (0–2), A. Ronan (0–2), B. Hennessy (0–1).		P. Potterton (0–4), R. Kelly -Lynch (1–0), M. Cole (0–2), C. Sheridan (0–1), M. Smith (0–1).

Referee: P. Aherne (Carlow)

June 19
Quarter-Final
Replay

Wexford	3–22 – 1–11	Dublin
E. Scallan (0–7), M. Storey (1–3), B. Byrne (1–1), J. O'Connor (1–0), L. Dunne (0–2), A. Fenlon (0–2), P. Finn (0–2), T. Kehoe (0–1), J. Fleming (0–1), L. Murphy (0–1), T. Dunne (0–1), G. Cushe (0–1).		A. O'Grady (0–7), R. Boland (1–0), J. Murphy (0–2), P. Tobin (0–1), B. McMahon (0–1).

Nowlan Park, Kilkenny
Referee: S. O'Meara (Offaly)

June 26
Semi-Final

Wexford	4–24 – 4–6	Laois
E. Scallan (2–4), M. Storey (0–8), B. Byrne (1–2), L. Murphy (1–1), T. Kehoe (0–3), A. Fenlon (0–2), T. Dunne (0–2), P. Finn (0–1), L. Dunne (0–1).		J. Taylor (2–0), P. Bergin (1–1), D. Cuddy (1–1), N. Delaney (0–1), A. Bergin (0–1), J. Dollard (0–1), N. Rigney (0–1).

Croke Park, Dublin
Attendance: 25,271
Referee: P. O'Connor (Limerick)

June 26
Semi-Final

Offaly	2–16 – 3–9	Kilkenny
Johnny Dooley (0–6), Joe Dooley (1–2), B. Dooley (1–2), M. Duignan (0–2), B. Whelehan (0–1), D. Pilkington (0–1), D. Regan (0–1), J. Pilkington (0–1).		D. J. Carey (2–1), E. Morrissey (0–4), J. Brennan (1–0), D. Gaffney (0–1), P. J. Delaney (0–1), M. Phelan (0–1), J. Power (0–1).

Croke Park, Dublin
Attendance: 25,271
Referee: A. Mac Suibhne (Dublin)

July 17
Final

Offaly	1–18 – 0–14	Wexford
Johnny Dooley (0–9), B. Dooley (1–1), J. Troy (0–2), J. Pilkington (0–2), B. Kelly (0–1), M. Duignan (0–1), D. Regan (0–1), D. Pilkington (0–1).		E. Scallan (0–5), M. Storey (0–2), T. Kehoe (0–2), T. Dempsey (0–1), L. Murphy (0–1), B. Byrne (0–1), L. Dunne (0–1), P. Finn (0–1).

Croke Park, Dublin
Attendance: 32,141
Referee: A. Mac Suibhne (Dublin)

== Munster Senior Hurling Championship ==
May 29
Quarter-Final

Clare	2–11 – 0–13	Tipperary
J. O'Connor (0–7), T. Guilfoyle (2–0), J. McInerney (0–1), P. J. O'Connell (0–1), F. Tuohy (0–1), G. O'Loughlin (0–1).		M. Cleary (0–9), D. Ryan (0–1), A. Crosse (0–1), A. Ryan (0–1), P. Fox (0–1).

Gaelic Grounds, Limerick
Referee: W. Horgan (Cork)

June 5
Quarter-Final

Limerick	4–14 – 4–11	Cork
G. Kirby (2–5), P. Heffernan (2–0), M. Galligan (0–3), M. Houlihan (0–2), F. Carroll (0–2), D. Quigley (0–1), T. J. Ryan (0–1).		K. Murray (2–0), M. Mullins (1–2), B. Egan (0–5), G. Manley (1–0), S. McCarthy (0–1), T. O'Sullivan (0–1), D. Quirke (0–1), T. Kelleher (0–1).

Gaelic Grounds, Limerick
Attendance: 19,191
Referee: S. McMahon (Clare)

June 12
Semi-Final

Kerry	1–8 – 2–16	Clare
M. Hennessy (1–5), S. Sheehan (0–2), C. Walsh (0–1).		J. McInerney (1–2), J. O'Connor (0–5), A. Whelan (1–1), G. O'Loughlin (0–2), P. J. O'Connell (0–2), J. Chaplin (0–2), F. Tuohy (0–1), J. O'Connell (0–1), C. Chaplin (0–1).

Austin Stack Park, Tralee
Attendance: 10,150
Referee: J. McDonnell (Tipperary)

June 19
Semi-Final

Limerick	2–14 – 2–12	Waterford
G. Kirby (1–7), P. J. Ryan (1–1), M. Galligan (0–2), P. Heffernan (0–1), J. Roche (0–1), G. Hegarty (0–1), F. Carroll (0–1).		B. O'Sullivan (1–3), G. Harris (1–1), P. Flynn (0–4), J. Meaney (0–2), L. O'Connor (0–1), P. Fanning (0–1).

Semple Stadium, Thurles
Attendance: 22,364
Referee: D. Murphy (Wexford)

July 10
Final

Limerick	0–25 – 2–10	Clare
G. Kirby (0–9), M. Galligan (0–7), C. Carey (0–2), F. Carroll (0–2), P. Heffernan (0–2), D. Quigley (0–2), T. J. Ryan (0–1).		T. Guilfoyle (1–0), C. Lyons (1–0), G. O;Loughlin (0–3), J. O'Connor (0–3), J. McInerney (0–1), S. Sheedy (0–1), C. Chaplin (0–1), A. Whelan (0–1).

Semple Stadium, Thurles
Attendance: 43,368
Referee: W. Barrett (Tipperary)

== Ulster Senior Hurling Championship ==
July 3
Final

Antrim	1–19 – 1–13	Down
A. Elliot (0–5), P. Walsh (0–4), C. McCambridge (1–0), J. Connolly (0–3), P. Jennings (0–3), Gregory O'Kane (0–2), P. McKillen (0–1), J. Carson (0–1).		D. O'Prey (0–6), C. Mageean (1–0), H. Gilmore (0–3), N. Sands (0–1), K. Coulter (0–1), D. Hughes (0–1), B. Coulter (0–1).

Casement Park, Belfast
Referee: P. Horan (Offaly)

== All-Ireland Senior Hurling Championship ==
=== Bracket ===
Quarter-finals
Roscommon	2–06
Galway	2–21

Semi-finals
Offaly	2–13
Galway	1–10
Limerick	2–23
Antrim	0–11

Final
Offaly	3–16
Limerick	2–13

=== All-Ireland quarter-finals ===
July 17
Quarter-Final

Roscommon	2–6 – 2–21	Galway
L. Murray (1–1), D. Coyle (0–4), F. Farrell (1–0), M. Cunniffe (0–1).		L. Burke (1–9), J. Rabbitte (1–0), M. McGrath (0–3), M. Coleman (0–2), J. Cooney (0–2), Pádraig Kelly (0–1), F. Forde (0–1), N. Shaughnessy (0–1), P. Kelly (0–1), K. McGrath (0–1).

Athleague
Attendance: 4,000
Referee: J. McDonnell (Tipperary)

=== All-Ireland semi-finals ===
August 7
Semi-Final

Limerick	2–23 – 0–11	Antrim
G. Kirby (1–6), F. Carroll (0–7), M. Galligan (1–1), M. Houlihan (0–3), D. Quigley (0–2), T. J. Ryan (0–1), L. O'Connor (0–1), G. Hegarty (0–1), C. Carey (0–1).		J. Carson (0–4), P. Jennings (0–2), P. McKillen (0–2), Conor McCambridge (0–1), Greg O'Kane (0–1), S. McMullan (0–1).

Croke Park, Dublin
Attendance: 45,053
Referee: D. Murphy (Wexford)

August 7
Semi-Final

Offaly	2–13 – 1–10	Galway
Johnny Dooley (0–7), B. Dooley (1–1), John Troy (1–0), Joe Dooley (0–2), P. O'Connor (0–1), M. Duignan (0–1), K. Martin (0–1).		L. Burke (0–5), J. Cooney (1–1), J. Rabbitte (0–1), M. McGrath (0–1), P. Malone (0–1), J. McGrath (0–1).

Croke Park, Dublin
Attendance: 45,053
Referee: W. Barrett (Tipperary)

=== All-Ireland final ===
September 3
Final
15:30

Offaly	3–16 – 2–13	Limerick
Johnny Dooley (1–4), Joe Dooley (1–2), B. Dooley (0–5), P. O'Connor (1–0), J. Pilkington (0–2), M. Duignan (0–1), D. Pilkington (0–1), J. Troy (0–1).		D. Quigley (2–3), G. Kirby (0–6), C. Carey (0–2), L. O'Connor (0–1), M. Houlihan (0–1).

Croke Park, Dublin
Attendance: 56,458
Referee: W. Barrett (Tipperary)

== Statistics ==
=== Scoring ===
- Widest winning margin: 18 points
  - Wexford 4–24 (36) : (18) 4–6 Laois (Leinster semi-final)
  - Limerick 2–23 (29) : (11) 0–11 (11) Antrim (All-Ireland semi-final)
- Most goals in a match: 8
  - Wexford 4–24 : 4–6 Laois (Leinster semi-final)
  - Limerick 4–14: 4–11 Cork (Munster quarter-final)
- Most points in a match: 35
  - Limerick 0–25 : 2–10 Clare (Munster final)
- Most goals by one team in a match: 4
  - Wexford 4–24 : 4–6 Laois (Leinster semi-final)
  - Limerick 4–14: 4–11 Cork (Munster quarter-final)
- Most goals scored by a losing team: 4
  - Laois 4–6 : 4–24 Wexford (Leinster semi-final)
  - Cork 4–11 : 4–14 Limerick (Munster quarter-final)
- Most points scored by a winning team: 25
  - Limerick 0–25 : 2–10 Clare (Munster final)
- Most points scored by a losing team: 14
  - Wexford 0–14 : 1–18 Offaly (Leinster final)

=== Top scorers ===
Overall

Rank	Player	County	Tally	Total	Matches	Average
1	Gary Kirby	Limerick	4–33	45	5	9.00
2	Johnny Dooley	Offaly	1–26	29	4	7.25
3	Éamonn Scallan	Wexford	2–16	22	4	5.50
4	Martin Storey	Wexford	1–16	19	4	4.75
5	Billy Dooley	Offaly	3–9	18	4	4.50
6	David Doyle	Carlow	3–8	17	2	8.50
6	Liam Burke	Galway	1–14	17	2	8.50
6	Pat Potterton	Meath	1–14	17	3	5.66
9	Mike Galligan	Limerick	1–13	16	5	3.20
10	Jamesie O'Connor	Clare	0–15	15	3	5.00

Single game

Rank	Player	County	Tally	Total	Opposition
1	David Doyle	Carlow	2–6	12	Wicklow
1	Liam Burke	Galway	1–9	12	Roscommon
3	Gary Kirby	Limerick	2–5	11	Cork
4	Gary Kirby	Limerick	1–7	10	Waterford
4	Éamonn Scallan	Wexford	2–4	10	Laois
6	Paul Finn	Wexford	2–3	9	Dublin
6	Damien Quigley	Limerick	2–3	9	Offaly
6	Gary Kirby	Limerick	1–6	9	Antrim
6	Brendan Hayden	Carlow	1–6	9	Wicklow
6	Johnny Dooley	Offaly	0–9	9	Wexford
6	Michael Cleary	Tipperary	0–9	9	Clare
6	Gary Kirby	Limerick	0–9	9	Clare
