= Tipperary county hurling team results (1980–1989) =

This article contains the results of the Tipperary county hurling team in the Championship during the 1980s.

Tipperary played 26 Championship games during the decade, winning 13, losing 9 and drawing 4. They won 3 Munster titles in 1987, 1988, and 1989, and won 1 All Ireland title in 1989.

== 1980 ==
23 June
Munster Semi-Final

Tipperary	1–12 – 2–17	Cork
S. Bourke (1–3), T. Butler (0–4), P. Queally (0–2), G. Stapleton (0–1), E. O'Shea (0–1), J. Kehoe (0–1).	Report	J. Fenton (0–7), T. Cashman (1–2), R. Cummins (0–4), S. O'Leary (1–0), P. Horgan (0–2), E. O'Donoghue (0–1), J. Barry-Murphy (0–1).

Semple Stadium, Thurles
Attendance: 42,836
Referee: J. J. Landers (Waterford)

== 1981 ==
7 June
Semi-Final

Tipperary	3–13 – 4–10	Limerick
J. Grogan (2–6), P. Queally (1–1), E. O'Shea (0–3), P. Fox (0–1), M. Carroll (0–1), K. Fox (0–1).	Report	J. McKenna (3–1), E. Cregan (0–4), B. Carroll (1–0), J. Flanagan (0–3), P. Kelly (0–1), G. McMahon (0–1).

Semple Stadium, Thurles
Attendance: 16,500
Referee: N. Dalton (Waterford)

21 June
Munster Semi-Final Replay

Limerick	3–17 – 2–12	Tipperary
J. McKenna (1–2), M. Grimes (0–4), P. Kelly (0–4), E. Cregan (1–0), J. Flanagan (1–0), W. Fitzmaurice (0–2), S. Foley (0–1).	Report	S. Burke (2–3), E. O'Shea (0–2), J. Grogan (0–2), J. O'Dwyer (0–1), P. Fox (0–1), P. Queally (0–1), G. O'Brien (0–1), D. Cahill (0–1).

Gaelic Grounds, Limerick
Attendance: 29,299
Referee: J. J. Landers (Waterford)

== 1982 ==
30 May
Munster Quarter-Final

Cork	1–19 – 2–8	Tipperary
T. O'Sullivan (0–7), J. Barry-Murphy (1–3), P. Horgan (0–3), T. Cashman (0–2), T. Crowley (0–2), S. O'Leary (0–1), B. Murphy (0–1).		N. O'Dwyer (1–1), M. McGrath (1–0), P. McGrath (0–3), P. Fox (0–1), N. English (0–1), B. Carroll (0–1), B. Ryan (0–1).

Páirc Uí Chaoimh, Cork

== 1983 ==
29 May
Munster Quarter-Final

Tipperary	2–11 – 1–11	Clare
J. Grogan (1–6), T. Waters (1–0), P. Dooley (0–2), N. English (0–1), L. Bergin (0–1), L. Maher (0–1).		E. O'Connor (1–0), G. McInerney (0–3), C. Honan (0–3), P. Morey (0–1), S. Hehir (0–1), T. Nugent (0–1), J. Callinan (0–1), J. Shanahan (0–1).

Gaelic Grounds, Limerick
Referee: F. Murphy (Cork)

19 June
Semi-Final

Waterford	4–13 – 2–15	Tipperary
T. Casey (1–3), J. Greene (1–2), E. Rockett (1–1), S. Breen (1–0), P. McGrath (0–2), P. Ryan (0–2), M. Walsh (0–2), J. Hennebry (0–1).		J. Grogan (0–7), T. Water (1–1), R. Callaghan (1–0), P. Fitzelle (0–2), L. Maher (0–2), P. Dooley (0–1), N. English (0–1), M. Doyle (0–1).

Páirc Uí Chaoimh, Cork
Referee: F. Murphy (Cork)

== 1984 ==
17 June
Munster Semi-Final
3:45 pm

Tipperary	1–15 – 2–11	Clare
S. Power (0–5), L. Maher (1–1), N. English (0–4), N. O'Dwyer (0–2), P. Fitzelle (0–2), D. O'Connell (0–1).		G. McInerney (2–0), C. Lyons (0–5), J. Callinan (0–3), E. O'Connor (0–1), C. Honan (0–1), J. Shanahan (0–1).

Semple Stadium, Thurles
Attendance: 18,105
Referee: N. Duggan (Limerick)

15 July
Munster Final
3:45 pm

Tipperary	3–14 – 4–15	Cork
S. Power (1–6), D. O'Connell (1–2), N. English (1–0), N. O'Dwyer (0–2), P. Kennedy (0–2), P. Dooley (0–1), L. Maher (0–1).		J. Fenton (0–7), J. Barry-Murphy (2–0), S. O'Leary (1–1), T. O'Sullivan (1–0), P. Horgan (0–3), K. Hennessy (0–3), P. Hartnett (0–1).

Semple Stadium, Thurles
Attendance: 50,093
Referee: J. Moore (Waterford)

== 1985 ==
9 June
Semi-Final

Clare	1–8 – 1–8	Tipperary
C. Lyons (0–4), T. Guilfoyle (1–0), V. Donnellan (0–2), D. Coote (0–1), A. Nugent (0–1).		M. Doyle (1–0), S. Power (0–2), J. McIntyre (0–1), I. Conroy (0–1), N. English (0–1), D. O'Connell (0–1), L. Maher (0–1), G. O'Neill (0–1).

Cusack Park, Ennis
Attendance: 21,305
Referee: J. Moore (Waterford)

23 June
Semi-Final Replay

Tipperary	3–14 – 4–6	Clare
S. Power (2–5), N. English (2–0), D. O'Connell (1–3), G. O'Neill (0–3), M. Doyle (0–1), M. Scully (0–1), L. Maher (0–1).		C. Lyons (1–4), V. Donnellan (2–0), T. Guilfoyle (0–1), G. McInerney (0–1).

Semple Stadium, Thurles
Attendance: 23,673
Referee: J. Moore (Waterford)

7 July
Final

Cork	4–17 – 4–11	Tipperary
J. Fenton (1–6), J. Barry-Murphy (1–3), D. Walsh (1–2), T. Mulcahy (1–0), T. O'Sullivan (0–3), K. Hennessy (0–1), P. Horgan (0–1), D. Mac Curtain (0–1).		N. English (2–3), G. O'Neill (1–3), L. Maher (1–0), A. Ryan (0–1), S. Power (0–1), B. Ryan (0–1), I. Conroy (0–1), G. Stapleton (0–1).

Páirc Uí Chaoimh, Cork
Attendance: 48,902
Referee: J. Moore (Waterford)

== 1986 ==
22 June
Semi-Final

Clare	2–10 – 1–11	Tipperary
T. Guilfoyle (1–1), G. McInerney (1–0), V. Donnellan (0–3), S. Fitzpatrick (0–2), C. Lyons (0–2), S. Dolan (0–1), A. Cunningham (0–1).		S. Power (0–5), L. Maher (1–1), L. Stokes (0–3), P. Kennedy (0–1), R. Callaghan (0–1).

Cusack Park, Ennis
Attendance: 21,655
Referee: T. Murray (hurler)

== 1987 ==
24 May
Munster Quarter-Final

Kerry	2-6 – 1-21	Tipperary
J. Hennessy (1-1), B. Neenan (1-0), E. Murphy (0-3), S. Sheahan (0-1), C. Nolan (0-1).		P. Fox (1-10), M. Scully (0-3), C. Bonnar (0-2), A. Ryan (0-2), L. Stokes (0-2), M. Doley (0-1), D. O'Connell (0-1).

FitzGerald Stadium, Killarney
Attendance: 1,500
Referee: F. Murphy (Cork)

7 June
Munster Semi-Final

Tipperary	1-13 – 1-13	Clare
P. Fox (0-7), N. English (1-3), A. Ryan (0-2), J. McGrath (0-1).		C. Lyons (0-8), G. McInenrey (1-0), T. Guilfoyle (0-3). M. Guilfoyle (0-1), J. Shanahan (0-1).

FitzGerald Stadium, Killarney
Attendance: 18,000
Referee: T. Murray (Limerick)

21 June
Munster Semi-Final Replay

Tipperary	4-17 – 0-8	Clare
N. English (2-4), P. Fox (0-7), B. Ryan (1-1), D. O'Connell (1-0), A. Ryan (0-3), R. Stakelum (0-1), P. Hayes (0-1).		A. Cunningham (0-2), C. Lyons (0-2), M. Guilfoyle (0-2), G. O'Loughlin (0-1).

FitzGerald Stadium, Killarney
Attendance: 23,000
Referee: T. Murray (Limerick)

12 July
Munster Final

Tipperary	1-18 – 1-18	Cork
P. Fox (0-9), N. English (1-1), D. O'Donnell (0-4), A. Ryan (0-2), R. Stakelum (0-1), J. McGrath (0-1).		J. Fenton (0-12), T. O'Sullivan (0-4), K. Kingston (1-0), K. Hennessy (0-1), T. McCarthy (0-1).

Semple Stadium, Thurles
Attendance: 56,005
Referee: T. Murray (Limerick)

19 July
Munster Final Replay

Tipperary	4-22 – 1-22 (AET)	Cork
P. Fox (0-11), M. Doyle (2-0), N. English (1-1), D. O'Connell (1-1), M. McGrath (0-3), A. Ryan (0-3), P. Delaney (0-2), P. Fitzelle (0-1).		J. Fenton (0-13), T. Mulcahy (1-2), T. McCarthy (0-3), T. O'Sullivan (0-3), G. FitzGerald (0-1).

FitzGerald Stadium, Killarney
Attendance: 45,000
Referee: T. Murray (Limerick)

9 August
All Ireland Semi-Final

Galway	3-20 – 2-17	Tipperary
E. Ryan (1-4), J. Cooney (0-6), M. Naughton (1-0), M. Nale (1-0), A. Cunningha (0-3), S. Mahon (0-3), M. McGrath (0-3), B. Lynskey (0-1).		P. Fox (2-1), N. English (0-6), P. Delaney (0-3), M. McGrath (0-2), D. O'Connell (0-2), A. Ryan (0-2), J. Hayes (0-1).

Croke Park, Dublin
Attendance: 49,410
Referee: G. Kirwan (Offaly)

== 1988 ==
5 June
Munster Semi-Final

Tipperary	0-15 – 0-8	Limerick
P. Fox (0-7), J. Hayes (0-2), P. O'Neill (0-2), D. Ryan (0-1), A. Ryan (0-1), J. Kennedy (0-1), C. Bonnar (0-1).		G. Kirby (0-4), B. Finn (0-2), P. McCarthy (0-1), O. O'Connor (0-1).

Páirc Uí Chaoimh, Cork
Attendance: 32,084
Referee: W. Horgan (Cork)

17 July
Munster Final

Tipperary	2-19 – 1-13	Cork
N. English (0-9), D. Ryan (1-1), Cormac Bonbnar (1-0), P. Delaney (0-3), J. Hayes (0-2), D. O'Connell (0-2), A. Ryan (0-2).		P. Horgan (1-4), T. O'Sullivan (0-5), P. O'Connor (0-2), G. FitzGerald (0-1), T. McCarthy (0-1).

Gaelic Grounds, Limerick
Attendance: 50,000
Referee: T. Murray (Limerick)

7 August
All Ireland Semi-Final

Tipperary	3-15 – 2-10	Antrim
N. English (1-7), P. Fox (2-1), A. Ryan (0-2), P. Delaney (0-2), P. O'Neill (0-1), J. Hayes (0-1), D. Ryan (0-1).	Report	O. McFetridge (1-5), F. McAllister (1-0), B. Donnelly (0-2), D. Donnelly (0-1), B. Laverty (0-1), P. McKillen (0-1).

Croke Park, Dublin
Attendance: 37,954
Referee: J. Denton (Wexford)

4 September
All Ireland Final

Galway	1-15 – 0-14	Tipperary
N. Lane (1-0), P. Malone (0-3), M. Naughton (0-2), M. McGrath (0-2), T. Keady (0-2), G. McInerney (0-2), J. Cooney (0-1), E. Ryan (0-1), B. Lynskey (0-1), C. Hayes (0-1).	Report	N. English (0-6), F. Ryan (0-4), D. O'Connell (0-2), A. Ryan (0-1), P. Delaney (0-1).

Croke Park, Dublin
Attendance: 63,545
Referee: G. Kirwan (Offaly)

== 1989 ==
11 June
Munster Semi-Final

Tipperary	4-18 – 2-11	Limerick
N. English (2-5), P. Fox (1-5), J. Hayes (1-2), J. Leahy (0-1), Conal Bonnar (0-1), P. Delaney (0-1), D. Ryan (0-1), Cormac Bonnar (0-1), J. Cormack (0-1).		S. Fitzgibbon (1-4), G. Kirby (0-4), T. Kenny (1-0), M. Galligan (0-1), M. Nelligan (0-1), M. Reale (0-1).

Páirc Uí Chaoimh, Cork
Attendance: 23,159
Referee: W. Horgan (Cork)

2 July
Munster Final

Tipperary	0-26 – 2-8	Waterford
N. English (0-13), P. Delaney (0-3), M. Cleary (0-3), P. Fox (0-2), J. Cormack (0-1), A. Ryan (0-1), J. Hayes (0-1), J. Leahy (0-1), Conal Bonnar (0-1).		K. Delahunty (1-4), L. O'Connor (1-1), S. Aherne (0-1), B. Sullivan (0-1), P. Prendergast (0-1).

Páirc Uí Chaoimh, Cork
Attendance: 30,241
Referee: W. Horgan (Cork)

6 August
All Ireland Semi-Final

Tipperary	1-17 – 2-11	Galway
N. English (0-8), P. Fox (1-2), P. Delaney (0-3), C. Bonnar (0-2), D. Ryan (0-1), M. Cleary (0-1).	Report	É. Ryan (2-1), M. McGrath (0-3), J. Cooney (0-3), G. Burke (0-2), J. Treacy (0-1), M. Coleman (0-1).

Croke Park, Dublin
Attendance: 64,127
Referee: J. Denton (Wexford)

3 September
All Ireland Final

Tipperary	4-24 – 3-9	Antrim
N. English (2-12), D. Ryan (1-3), P. Fox (1-2), J. Leahy (0-3), D. Carr (0-2), M. Cleary (0-2).	Report	B. Donnelly (1-1), O. McFetridge (0-3), A. McCarry (1-0), D. Armstrong (1-0), T. McNaughton (0-2), P. McKillen (0-1), L. McKeegan (0-1), D. McKillop (0-1).

Croke Park, Dublin
Attendance: 65,496
Referee: P. Delaney (Laois)
