= Clare–Tipperary hurling rivalry =

Sports rivalry in Ireland

Tipperary–Clare
- First meeting: 1887
- Latest meeting: 2026 Munster Senior Hurling Championship
- Next meeting: TBD

Statistics
- Total meetings: 62
- All-time series (Championship only): Tipperary 41–17 Clare (4 draws)
- Largest victory: Tipperary 11-2 : 1- Clare (1923)

The Tipperary–Clare rivalry is a hurling rivalry between Irish county teams Tipperary and Clare.

While both teams play provincial hurling in the Munster Senior Hurling Championship, they have also enjoyed success in the All-Ireland Senior Hurling Championship, with Tipperary winning 26 titles and Clare winning five titles. They played against each other in the 1997 All-Ireland Senior Hurling Championship Final, the first time two Munster teams had played in the final.

Revelry between the two teams was at its peak in the late 1990s to early 2000s when they played each other six times in Páirc Uí Chaoimh between 1999 and 2003.

== Results since 1990 ==
4 July
1993 Munster Final

Tipperary	3-27 – 2-12	Clare
M. Cleary (1-4), J. Leahy (1-4), A. Crosse (1-4), A. Ryan (0-5), P. Fox (0-3), N. English (0-3), D. Ryan (0-3), Colm Bonnar (0-1).	Report	C. Lyons (1-1), J. O'Connor (0-4), J. McInerney (1-0), J. Chaplin (0-2), F. Tuohy (0-2), G. O'Loughlin (0-1), J. O'Connell (0-1), P. Markham (0-1).

Gaelic Grounds, Limerick
Attendance: 41,557
Referee: T. Murray (Limerick)
29 May
1994 Munster Quarter-Final

Clare	2-11 – 0-13	Tipperary
J. O'Connor (0-7), T. Guilfoyle (2-0), J. McInerney (0-1), P. J. O'Connell (0-1), F. Tuohy (0-1), G. O'Loughlin (0-1).	Report	M. Cleary (0-9), D. Ryan (0-1), A. Crosse (0-1), A. Ryan (0-1), P. Fox (0-1).

Gaelic Grounds
Referee: W. Horgan (Cork)
6 July
1997 Munster Final

Clare	1-18 – 0-18	Tipperary
J. O'Connor (0-5), D. Forde (1-1), G. O'Loughlin (0-3), S. McMahon (0-3), P. J. O'Connell (0-2), C. Lynch (0-1), F. Tuohy (0-1), S. McNamara (0-1), B. Murphy (0-1).	Report	T. Dunne (0-7), D. Ryan (0-4), K. Tucker (0-3), J. Leahy (0-3), M. Cleary (0-1).

Páirc Uí Chaoimh, Cork
Attendance: 43,560
Referee: P. O'Connor (Limerick)
14 September
1997 All Ireland Final

Clare	0-20 – 2-13	Tipperary
J. O'Connor (0-7), N. Gilligan (0-3), O. Baker (0-2), C. Lynch (0-2), D. Forde (0-2), S. McMahon (0-1), G. O'Loughlin (0-1), C. Clancy (0-1), L. Doyle (0-1).	Report	T. Dunne (0-5), E. O'Neill (1-1), J. Leahy (0-4), L. Cahill (1-0), M. Cleary (0-1), C. Gleeson (0-1), B. O'Meara (0-1).

Croke Park, Dublin
Attendance: 65,575
Referee: D. Murphy (Wexford)
1999-06-06
1999 Munster Semi-final

Clare	2-12 – 0-18	Tipperary
J. O'Connor 1-2 (0-2 frees); D. Fitzgerald 1-0 penalty; D. Forde 0-3; N. Gilligan 0-2; A. Markham, S. McMahon, C. Lynch, B. Murphy and C. Clancy 0-1 each.	(report)	T. Dunne 0-7 (0-3 frees, 0-2 7 seventies); L. Cahill 0-3; P. Shelley 0-2; J. Leahy, E. Enright, B. O'Meara, E. Tucker, D. Ryan and P. Kelly 0-1 each.

Páirc Uí Chaoimh, Cork
Referee: D. Murphy (Wexford).
1999-06-12
1999 Munster Semi-final
Replay

Clare	1-21 – 1-11	Tipperary
A. Markham 1-3; S. McMahon 0-6 (0-5 frees); C. Lynch 0-4; B. Murphy 0-3; D. Forde 0-2 frees; J. O'Connor (free), O. Baker and E. Flannery 0-1 each.	(report)	T. Dunne 0-10 (0-9 from frees); D. Ryan 1-0 free; E. Enright 0-1.

Páirc Uí Chaoimh, Cork
Referee: D. Murphy (Wexford).
2000-06-11
2000 Munster Semi-Final

Tipperary	2-19 – 1-14	Clare
E. O'Neill (0-7), D. Ryan (1-1), P. Shelly (1-0), J. Leahy (0-3), B. O'Meara (0-3), M. O'Leary (0-3), T. Dunne (0-1), P. O'Brien (0-1).	(Report)	D. Forde (1-1), J. O'Connor (0-3), N. Gilligan (0-2), S. McMahon (0-2), G. Quinn (0-1), B. Quinn (0-1), A. Daly (0-1), E. Flannery (0-1), K. Ralph (0-1), B. Murphy (0-1).

Páirc Uí Chaoimh, Cork
Referee: P. O'Connor (Limerick)
3 June
2001 Munster Semi-Final

Tipperary	0-15 – 0-14	Clare
E. Kelly (0-7), E. Enright (0-2), T. Dunne (0-2), B. O'Meara (0-1), L. Corbett (0-1), D. Ryan (0-1), P. Kelly (0-1).	(Report)	J. O'Connor (0-7), D. Forde (0-4), S. McMahon (0-3).

Páirc Uí Chaoimh, Cork
Attendance: 42,063
Referee: D. Murphy (Wexford)
19 May
2002 Munster Quarter-Final

Tipperary	1-18 - 2-13	Clare
E. Kelly (1-8), C. Gleeson (0-2), N. Morris (0-2), T. Dunne (0-2), B. O'Meara (0-1), J. O'Brien (0-1), E. O'Neill (0-1), B. Dunne (0-1).	Report	D. Forde (2-0), T. Griffin (0-6), J. Reddan (0-3), J. O'Connor (0-2), T. Carmody (0-1), N. Gilligan (0-1).

Páirc Uí Chaoimh, Cork
Referee: M. Healy (Cork))
18 May
2003 Munster Quarter-final

Clare	2-17 - 0-14	Tipperary
N. Gilligan 0-6 (0-3 frees); A. Quinn 1-2; J. O'Connor 1-1; C. Lynch 0-2; A. Markham 0-2; T. Carmody, T. Griffin, D. McMahon, S. McMahon (free), 0-1 each		E. Kelly 0-7 (0-4 frees); B. O'Meara 0-3; T. Dunne, C. Gleeson, L. Cahill, J. Carroll, 0-1 each

Páirc Uí Chaoimh, Cork
Referee: A. Mac Suibhne (Dublin)
5 June
2005 Munster Semi-final

Tipperary	2-14 – 0-14	Clare
E Kelly 0-7 (4f); L Corbett 1-1; M Webster 1-0; E Sweeney, F Devaney 0-2 each; B Dunne, P Kelly 0-1 each.	Report	N Gilligan 0-5 (3f); D McMahon, S McMahon (2f), B Nugent, T Griffin 0-2 each; T Carmody 0-1.

Gaelic Grounds, Limerick
Referee: P O'Connor (Limerick)
13 July
2008 Munster Final

Tipperary	2-21 - 0-19	Clare
J O'Brien 1-4, S Callinan 1-3, E Kelly 0-6 (2f), S McGrath 0-3, L Corbett 0-2, J Woodlock, P Kerwick, H Maloney 0-1 each.		N Gilligan 0-8 (5f), M Flaherty (3f), C Lynch 0-3 each, T Carmody 0-2, J Clancy, G Quinn, D McMahon 0-1 each.

Gaelic Grounds, Limerick
Attendance: 48,077
Referee: D Kirwan (Cork)
21 June
2009 Munster Semi-final

Tipperary	3-18 - 1-22	Clare
N McGrath 0-7, J O'Brien 1-2, L Corbett 1-1, S Callanan 1-0, P Kerwick, E Kelly 0-3 each, D Fanning, J Woodlock 0-1 each	(Report)	C Ryan 0-12, D McMahon 1-2, T Griffin, J Clancy, T Carmody 0-2 each, J Conlon, D Barrett 0-1 each

Gaelic Grounds, Limerick
Referee: J Owens (Wexford)
19 June 2011
4:00pm
2011 Munster Semi-final

Clare	1-19 - 4-19	Tipperary
C McGrath (1-06, 4f), J Conlon (0-03), C McInerney (0-02); D McMahon (0-02), J Clancy (0-02); J McInerney (0-01, f), N O'Connell (0-01), F Lynch (0-01), D Honan (0-01),	Report	S Callanan (1-05), E Kelly (1-03, 2f), L Corbett (1-00), Patrick Maher (1-00), N McGrath (0-03), Padraic Maher (0-02); G Ryan (0-02), S McGrath (0-02), P Bourke (0-02).

Gaelic Grounds, Limerick
Attendance: 16,700
Referee: J Owens (Wexford)
22 July
15:00
2017 All Ireland Quarter Final

Tipperary	0–28 – 3–16	Clare
S. Callanan (0-3 frees)(0-7); J. McGrath (0-6); J. O’Dwyer (0-1 free, N. McGrath (0-4 each); P. Maher, M. Breen (0-2 each); B. Maher (free), S. O’Brien, J. Forde (0-1 each)	Report	A. Cunningham (2-0), T. Kelly (0-4 frees)(0-6); S. O’Donnell (1-2); C. McGrath, D. Reidy (frees)(0-2 each); P. Duggan, C. McInerney, C. Galvin, J. Shanahan (0-1 each)

Páirc Uí Chaoimh
Attendance: 28,567
Referee: Colm Lyons (Cork)
10 June
14:00
2018 Munster Championship Group Stage

Clare	1–23 – 1-21	Tipperary
P Duggan 0-15 (13f). P Collins 0-3, I Galvin 1-0, T Kelly, J Conlon 0-2 each, J Browne 0-1.	Report	J Forde 0-10 (8f, 1'65'), B McCarthy 1-0, J McGrath 0-3, S Callanan, N McGrath 0-2 each, R Maher, Padraic Maher, Patrick Maher, C Barrett 0-1 each.

Semple Stadium, Thurles
Referee: Alan Kelly (Galway)
2 June
16:00
2019 Munster Championship Group Stage

Clare	0–17 – 3–21	Tipperary
P. Duggan (0-9, 8 frees); T. Kelly (0-3, 2 frees); P. Collins; D. Ryan, D. Fitzgerald, S. Golden, J. McCarthy (0-1 each).	Report	J. McGrath (0-6); J. Forde (0-6, frees); S. Callanan (1-3); N. McGrath, Patrick Maher (1-2 each); J. O’Dwyer, B. Maher (0-1 each).

Cusack Park, Ennis
Referee: Alan Kelly (Galway)
4 July
15:45
2021 Munster Semi-Final

Tipperary	3–22 – 2–21	Clare
Jason Forde 1-8 (1-0 pen, 0-3 frees, 0-1 65, 0-1 s-cut); John O’Dwyer 0-4; Michael Breen, Seamus Callanan 1-1 each; Jake Morris 0-3; Dan McCormack, Alan Flynn 0-2 each; Ronan Maher, Willie Connors 0-1 each.	Report	Tony Kelly 1-9 (0-8 frees); Ian Galvin 1-3; Cathal Malone, Ryan Taylor 0-2 each; Aron Shanagher, Aidan McCarthy, David Reidy, Rory Hayes, Colm, Galvin, John Conlon 0-1 each.

Gaelic Grounds, Limerick
Referee: James Owens (Wexford)
24 April
14:00
2022 Munster Championship Group Stage

Tipperary	2–16 – 3–21	Clare
Jason Forde 0-7 (5 frees, 1 65, 1 s-cut); Ger Browne 1-3; Barry Heffernan 1-0; Ronan Maher 0-2 (1 free); Cathal Barrett, Noel McGrath, Michael Breen, Mark Kehoe 0-1 each.	Report; Highlights	Tony Kelly 1-7 (1-0 pen, 0-5 frees); Peter Duggan, Ian Galvin 1-2 each; Ryan Taylor, Shane O’Donnell, Robyn Mounsey 0-2 each; Rory Hayes, Diarmuid Ryan, David McInerney, David Fitzgerald 0-1 each.

Semple Stadium
Referee: James Owens (Wexford)
23 April
16:00
2023 Munster Championship Group Stage

Clare	3–23 – 5–22	Tipperary
Aidan McCarthy 1-13 (7fs, 2’65), Mark Rodgers 2-0, Ryan Taylor, Ian Galvin, Shane Meehan 0-2 each, Diarmuid Ryan, Tony Kelly, John Conlon, Robin Mounsey 0-1 each.	Report; Highlights	Jason Forde 2-6 (1-0 Pen, 5fs, 1-1 sideline), Jake Morris 2-4, Sean Ryan 1-1, Noel McGrath 0-3, Gearoid O’Connor 0-2, Brian McGrath, Alan Tynan, John McGrath, Mark Kehoe, Seamus Kennedy, Conor Bowe 0-1 each.

Cusack Park, Ennis
Referee: Thomas Walsh (Waterford)
26 May
16:00
2024 Munster Championship Group Stage

Tipperary	0–24 – 1–24	Clare
Jake Morris 0-11 (7fs), Seanie Kenneally 0-3, Ronan Maher 0-2 (1f), Eoghan Connolly and Gearoid O’Connor (2fs) 0-2 each, Barry Heffernan, Alan Tynan, Noel McGrath, and Bryan O’Mara 0-1 each.	Report; Highlights	Aidan McCarthy 0-9 (6fs), Diarmuid Ryan 1-1, David Fitzgerald 0-3, Mark Rodgers 0-3 (2fs), Shane O’Donnell and Tony Kelly 0-2 each, Darragh Lohan, Peter Duggan, David Reidy, Ian Galvin 0-1 each.

Semple Stadium, Thurles
Referee: Johnny Murphy (Waterford)
10 May
18:00
2025 Munster Championship Group Stage

Clare	2–21 – 4–18	Tipperary
M Rodgers (1-13, 0-13 frees); T Kelly (1-1, 1-0 pen, 0-1 free); S Rynne (0-3); R Taylor (0-2); C Malone, P Duggan (0-1 each).	Report; Highlights	John McGrath (2-3); J Forde (0-8, 0-6 frees, 0-1 ‘65); A Ormond (2-1); E Connolly (0-3, 0-2 frees); J Morris (0-2); S Kenneally (0-1).

Cusack Park
Referee: J Owens (Wexford).
16 May
19:00
2026 Munster Championship Group Stage

Tipperary	0–17 – 1–25	Clare
Jake Morris 0-4; Eoghan Connolly (2f), Darragh McCarthy (3f), Jason Forde (1s/l) 0-3 each; Willie Connons, Alan Tynan, Conor Stakelum, Stefan Tobin 0-1 each.	Report; Highlights	Diarmuid Stritch 0-6; Ian Galvin 1-2; Tony Kelly 0-5 (4f); Peter Duggan (2s/l, 1f), Seán Rynne 0-4 each; Cathal Malone 0-2; Niall O’Farrell, Ryan Taylor 0-1 each.

Semple Stadium, Thurles
Referee: Thomas Walsh (Waterford)
