= 1993 All-Ireland Senior Hurling Championship =

Championship details
- Dates: 30 May – 5 September 1993
- Teams: 16

All-Ireland champions
- Winning team: Kilkenny (25th win)
- Captain: Eddie O'Connor
- Manager: Ollie Walsh

All-Ireland Finalists
- Losing team: Galway
- Captain: Michael McGrath
- Manager: Cyril Farrell

Provincial champions
- Munster: Tipperary
- Leinster: Kilkenny
- Ulster: Antrim
- Connacht: Not Played

Championship statistics
- No. matches played: 16
- Top Scorer: D. J. Carey (6–23)
- Player of the Year: D. J. Carey
- All-Star Team: See here

The All-Ireland Senior Hurling Championship of 1993 was the 107th staging of Ireland's premier hurling knock-out competition. Kilkenny won the championship, beating Galway 2–17 to 1–15 in the final at Croke Park, Dublin.

== Team changes ==
=== To Championship ===
Promoted from the All-Ireland Senior B Hurling Championship

- Meath (qualified)

=== From Championship ===
Regraded to the All-Ireland Senior B Hurling Championship

- Derry

== Teams ==
=== General information ===
Sixteen counties will compete in the All-Ireland Senior Hurling Championship: one team from the Connacht Senior Hurling Championship, six teams in the Leinster Senior Hurling Championship, six teams in the Munster Senior Hurling Championship, two teams from the Ulster Senior Hurling Championship and one team from the All-Ireland Senior B Hurling Championship.

County	Last provincial title	Last championship title	Position in 1991 Championship	Current championship
Antrim	1991	—		Ulster Senior Hurling Championship
Carlow	—	—		Leinster Senior Hurling Championship
Clare	1932	1914		Munster Senior Hurling Championship
Cork	1992	1990		Munster Senior Hurling Championship
Down	1992	—		Ulster Senior Hurling Championship
Dublin	1961	1938		Leinster Senior Hurling Championship
Galway	1922	1988		Connacht Senior Hurling Championship
Kerry	1891	1891		Munster Senior Hurling Championship
Kilkenny	1992	1992		Leinster Senior Hurling Championship
Laois	1949	1915		Leinster Senior Hurling Championship
Limerick	1981	1973		Munster Senior Hurling Championship
Meath	—	—		All-Ireland Senior B Hurling Championship
Offaly	1990	1985		Leinster Senior Hurling Championship
Tipperary	1991	1991		Munster Senior Hurling Championship
Waterford	1963	1959		Munster Senior Hurling Championship
Wexford	1977	1968		Leinster Senior Hurling Championship

=== Participating counties ===
Province	County	Stadium	Most recent success	
Province	County	Stadium	All-Ireland	Provincial
Leinster	Carlow	Dr. Cullen Park		
	Dublin	Parnell Park	1938	1961
	Kilkenny	Nowlan Park	1992	1992
	Laois	O'Moore Park	1915	1949
	Meath	Páirc Tailteann		
	Offaly	O'Connor Park	1985	1990
	Wexford	Wexford Park	1968	1977
Munster	Clare	Cusack Park	1914	1932
	Cork	Páirc Uí Chaoimh	1990	1992
	Kerry	Austin Stack Park	1891	1891
	Limerick	Gaelic Grounds	1973	1981
	Tipperary	Semple Stadium	1991	1991
	Waterford	Walsh Park	1959	1963
Connacht	Galway	Pearse Stadium	1988	1922
Ulster	Antrim	Casement Park		1991
	Down	Páirc Esler		1992

== Format ==
=== Leinster Championship ===
Quarter-finals: (2 matches) These are two lone matches between the first four teams drawn from the province of Leinster. Two teams are eliminated at this stage, while two teams advance to the semi-finals.

Semi-finals: (2 matches) The winners of the two quarter-finals join the other two Leinster teams to make up the semi-final pairings. Two teams are eliminated at this stage, while two teams advance to the final.

Final: (1 match) The winners of the two semi-finals contest this game. One team is eliminated at this stage, while the winners advance to the All-Ireland semi-final.

=== Ulster Championship ===
Final: (1 match) This is a lone match between the two competing Ulster teams. One team is eliminated at this stage, while the winners advance to the All-Ireland quarter-final.

=== Munster Championship ===
Quarter-finals: (2 matches) These are two lone matches between the first four teams drawn from the province of Munster. Two teams are eliminated at this stage, while two teams advance to the semi-finals.

Semi-finals: (2 matches) The winners of the two quarter-finals join the other two Munster teams to make up the semi-final pairings. Two teams are eliminated at this stage, while two teams advance to the final.

Final: (1 match) The winners of the two semi-finals contest this game. One team is eliminated at this stage, while the winners advance to the All-Ireland semi-final.

=== All-Ireland Championship ===
Quarter-final: (1 match) This is a lone match between the Ulster champions and the All-Ireland 'B' champions. One team is eliminated at this stage, while the winners advance to the All-Ireland semi-final where they play the Leinster champions.

Semi-finals: (2 matches) The Munster and Leinster champions will play the winners of the lone quarter-final and Galway. The Munster and Leinster winners will be in opposite semi-finals. Two teams are eliminated at this stage, while the two winners advance to the All-Ireland final.

Final: (1 match) The two semi-final winners will contest the All-Ireland final.

== Leinster Senior Hurling Championship ==
=== Bracket ===
Quarter-finals
Kilkenny	2–10
Offaly	0–14
Dublin	0–10
Wexford	1–14

Semi-finals
Carlow	0–16
Kilkenny	5–19
Laois	1–09
Wexford	0–15

Leinster final
Kilkenny	2–14, 2–12
Wexford	1–17, 0–11

May 30, 1993
Quarter-Final

Kilkenny	2–10 – 0–14	Offaly
D. J. Carey (2–4), A. Prendergast (0–2), B. Ryan (0–1), A. Ronan (0–1), P. J. Delaney (0–1), J. Power (0–1).		M. Conneely (0–6), J. Pilkington (0–3), J. Dooley (0–3), P. Corrigan (0–1), John Troy (0–1).

Croke Park, Dublin
Attendance: 13,082
Referee: P. Delaney (Laois)

June 6, 1993
Quarter-Final

Dublin	0–10 – 1–14	Wexford
A. O'Grady (0–5), S. Dalton (0–4), C. Barr (0–1).		T. Dempsey (0–6), J. O'Connor (1–0), L. Murphy (0–3), G. O'Connor (0–2), M. Storey (0–1), E. Scallan (0–1), L. Dunne (0–1).

Croke Park, Dublin
Referee: S. O'Meara (Offaly)

June 20, 1993
Semi-Final

Carlow	0–16 – 5–19	Kilkenny
J. Hayden (0–5), J. McDonald (0–4), B. Hayden (0–3), J. Byrne (0–2), D. Doyle (0–1), J. Carey (0–1).		E. Morrissey (2–3), L. McCarthy (1–5), J. Power (1–3), D. J. Carey (1–0), A. Ronan (0–3), R. Heffernan (0–2), L. Keoghan (0–1), B. Ryan (0–1), A. Prendergast (0–1).

Dr. Cullen Park, Carlow
Referee: P. Horan (Offaly)

June 20, 1993
Semi-Final

Wexford	0–15 – 1–9	Laois
T. Dempsey (0–7), M. Storey (0–5), C. McBride (0–1), E. Cleary (0–1), L. Murphy (0–1).		T. Dunne (0–5), P. J. Cuddy (1–0), N. Roe (0–1), J. Bates (0–1), N. Rigney (0–1), N. Delaney (0–1).

Dr. Cullen Park, Carlow
Referee: J. McDonnell (Tipperary)

July 11, 1993
Final

Kilkenny	2–14 – 1–17	Wexford
E. Morrissey (2–3), D. J. Carey (0–5), J. Brennan (0–2), P. O'Neill (0–1), B. Hennessy (0–1), A. Ronan (0–1), M. Phelan (0–1).		T. Dempsey (0–9), M. Storey (0–4), E. Scallan (1–0), L. Murphy (0–2), G. O'Connor (0–2).

Croke Park, Dublin
Attendance: 37,715
Referee: P. Horan (Offaly)

July 18, 1993
Final
Replay

Kilkenny	2–12 – 0–11	Wexford
D. J. Carey (1–5), P. J. Delaney (1–1), E. Morrissey (0–2), M. Phelan (0–1), J. Brennan (0–1), A. Ronan (0–1), J. Power (0–1).		T. Dempsey (0–6), M. Storey (0–3), J. O'Connor (0–1), R. Guiney (0–1).

Croke Park, Dublin
Attendance: 41,833
Referee: P. Horan (Offaly)

== Munster Senior Hurling Championship ==
May 23, 1993
Quarter-Final

Kerry	4–13 – 3–13	Waterford
D. J. Leahy (2–2), C. O'Sullivan (1–2), J. Walsh (1–1), T. Maunsell (0–3), D. O'Sullivan (0–2), J. P. Hickey (0–2), C. Walsh (0–1).		P. Flynn (3–2), L. O'Connor (0–4), P. Prendergast (0–2), N. Crowley (0–2), E. Cullinane (0–1), S. Daly (0–1), D. Byrne (0–1).

Walsh Park, Waterford
Attendance: 4,000
Referee: W. Horgan (Cork)

May 23, 1993
Quarter-Final

Clare	3–16 – 3–12	Limerick
C. Lyons (2–4), G. O'Loughlin (1–5), J. O'Connor (0–2), J. McInerney (0–1), P. Markham (0–1), J. Chaplin (0–1), D. Tobin (0–1), S. Sheedy (0–1).		C. Carey (1–2), P. Heffernan (1–1), F. Carroll (0–4), R. Sampson (1–0), G. Kirby (0–3), M. Reale (0–1), A. Garvey (0–1).

Cusack Park, Ennis
Attendance: 12,800
Referee: W. Barrett (Tipperary)

June 6, 1993
Semi-Final

Tipperary	4–21 – 2–9	Kerry
M. Cleary (3–2), C. Stakelum (1–2), D. Ryan (0–3), J. Leahy (0–3), A. Ryan (0–3), A. Crosse (0–3), T. Dunne (0–2), Colm Bonnar (0–2), D. Carr (0–1).		T. Maunsell (2–0), D. J. Leahy (0–3), B. Mahony (0–3), L. O'Connor (0–1), J. Walsh (0–1), S. Sheehan (0–1).

Semple Stadium, Thurles
Attendance: 11,303
Referee: T. Murray (Limerick)

June 13, 1993
Semi-Final

Clare	2–7 – 0–10	Cork
J. McInerney (1–0), F. Tuohy (1–0), G. O'Loughlin (0–3), C. Lyons (0–1), J. Russell (0–1), J. Chaplin (0–1), D. Tobin (0–1).		B. Egan (0–3), J. Fitzgibbon (0–2), P. Buckley (0–2), M. Mullins (0–1), G. Manley (0–1), C. Casey (0–1).

Gaelic Grounds, Limerick
Attendance: 14,586
Referee: P. Delaney (Laois)

July 4, 1993
Final

Tipperary	3–27 – 2–12	Clare
M. Cleary (1–4), J. Leahy (1–4), A. Crosse (1–4), A. Ryan (0–5), P. Fox (0–3), N. English (0–3), D. Ryan (0–3), Colm Bonnar (0–1).		C. Lyons (1–1), J. O'Connor (0–4), J. McInerney (1–0), J. Chaplin (0–2), F. Tuohy (0–2), G. O'Loughlin (0–1), J. O'Connell (0–1), P. Markham (0–1).

Gaelic Grounds, Limerick
Attendance: 41,557
Referee: T. Murray (Limerick)

== Ulster Senior Hurling Championship ==
July 4, 1993
Final

Antrim	0–24 – 0–11	Down
Greg O'Kane (0–7), P. McKillen (0–6), R. Donnelly (0–2), A. Elliott (0–2), S. P. McKillop (0–2), J. Close (0–2), T. McNaughton (0–2), P. Jennings (0–1).		J. McCrickard (0–6), G. Savage (0–2), D. Hughes (0–1), G. McGrattan (0–1), M. Baillie (0–1).

Casement Park, Belfast
Attendance: 10,000
Referee: D. Murphy (Wexford)

== All-Ireland Senior Hurling Championship ==
=== Bracket ===
Quarter-finals
Antrim	3–27
Meath	4–10

Semi-finals
Kilkenny	4–18
Antrim	1–09
Galway	1–16
Tipperary	1–14

Final
Kilkenny	2–17
Galway	1–15

=== All-Ireland quarter-finals ===
July 25, 1993
Quarter-Final

Antrim	3–27 – 4–10	Meath
O. McFetridge (2–7), Gregory O'Kane (1–4), P. Jennings (0–5), J. Close (0–4), Gary O'Kane (0–2), A. Elliott (0–2), C. McCambridge (0–1), T. McNaughton (0–1), D. McKinley (0–1).		P. Potterton (0–7), M. Massey (2–0), I. McCaffrey (1–0), M. Cole (1–2), P. Kelly (0–1).

Castleblaney
Attendance: 5,000
Referee: K. Walsh (Clare)

=== All-Ireland semi-finals ===
August 8, 1993
Semi-Final

Kilkenny	4–18 – 1–9	Antrim
D. J. Carey (2–5), P. J. Delaney (1–2), E. Morrissey (1–1), A. Ronan (0–3), D. Lawlor (0–2), P. O'Neill (0–1), M. Phelan (0–1), B. Hennessy (0–1), L. McCarthy (0–1), J. Power (0–1).		T. McNaughton (1–0), P. Jennings (0–2), A. Elliott (0–2), Greg O'Kane (0–1), P. McKillen (0–2), O. McFetridge (0–1), J. Close (0–1).

Croke Park, Dublin
Attendance: 43,257
Referee: D. Murphy (Wexford)

August 8, 1993
Semi-Final

Galway	1–16 – 1–14	Tipperary
J. Cooney (0–5), M. McGrath (1–1), J. McGrath (0–4), J. Rabbitte (0–2), L. Burke (0–2), P. Kelly (0–1), B. Keogh (0–1).		M. Cleary (0–8), P. Fox (1–0), D. Carr (0–1), D. Ryan (0–1), J. Leahy (0–1), A. Ryan (0–1), A. Crosse (0–1), N. English (0–1).

Croke Park, Dublin
Attendance: 43,257
Referee: T. Murray (Limerick)

=== All-Ireland final ===
September 5, 1993
Final
15:30 UTC+1

Kilkenny	2–17 – 1–15	Galway
P. J. Delaney (1–4), A. Ronan (1–2), D. J. Carey (0–4), L. McCarthy (0–3), E. Morrissey (0–2), J. Power (0–1), B. Hennessy (0–1).		J. Cooney (0–4), J. Rabbitte (0–4), L. Burke (1–0), P. Malone (0–3), P. Kelly (0–2), M. McGrath (0–2).

Croke Park, Dublin
Attendance: 63,460
Referee: T. Murray (Limerick)

Kilkenny	Galway

== Championship statistics ==
=== Scoring ===
- First goal of the championship: Paul Flynn for Waterford against Kerry (Munster quarter-final)
- Last goal of the championship: P. J. Delaney for Kilkenny against Galway (All-Ireland final)
- Hat-trick heroes:
  - First hat-trick of the championship: Paul Flynn for Waterford against Kerry (Munster quarter-final)
  - Second hat-trick of the championship: Michael Cleary for Tipperary against Kerry (Munster semi-final)
- Widest winning margin: 18 points
  - Kilkenny 5–19 : 0–16 Carlow (Leinster semi-final)
  - Tipperary 4–21 : 2–9 Kerry (Munster semi-final)
  - Tipperary 3–27 : 2–12 Clare (Munster final)
  - Kilkenny 4–18 : 1–9 Antrim (All-Ireland semi-final)
- Most goals in a match: 7
  - Kerry 4–13 : 3–13 Waterford (Munster quarter-final)
  - Antrim 3–27 : 4–10 Meath (All-Ireland quarter-final)
- Most points in a match: 39
  - Tipperary 3–27 : 2–12 Clare (Munster final)
- Most goals by one team in a match: 5
  - Kilkenny 5–19 : 0–16 Carlow (Leinster semi-final)
- Most goals scored by a losing team: 4
  - Meath 4–10 : 3–27 Antrim (All-Ireland quarter-final)
- Most points scored by a losing team: 16
  - Carlow 0–16 : 5–19 Kilkenny (Leinster semi-final)

=== Miscellaneous ===
- At the All-Ireland quarter-final between Antrim and Meath an oversight on the part of officials meant that Amhrán na bhFiann was not played before the match. It was claimed at the time that this was the first occasion that the national anthem was not played before an inter-county game.
- Kerry's defeat of Waterford in the Munster quarter-final was the team's first Munster championship victory since 1926.

== Roll of Honour ==
- Cork – 27 (1990)
- Kilkenny – 25 (1993)
- Tipperary – 24 (1991)
- Limerick – 7 (1973)
- Dublin – 6 (1938)
- Wexford – 5 (1968)
- Galway – 4 (1988)
- Waterford – 2 (1959)
- Offaly – 2 (1985)
- Laois – 1 (1915)
- Clare – 1 (1914)
- London – 1 (1901)
- Kerry – 1 (1891)

== Top scorers ==
=== Season ===
Rank	Player	County	Tally	Total	Matches	Average
1	D. J. Carey	Kilkenny	6–23	41	6	6.83
2	Tom Dempsey	Wexford	0–28	28	4	7.00
3	Michael Cleary	Tipperary	4–14	26	3	8.66
3	Eamon Morrissey	Kilkenny	5–11	26	6	4.33
5	P. J. Delaney	Kilkenny	3–8	17	5	3.40
6	Cyril Lyons	Clare	3–6	15	3	5.00
7	Olcan McFetridge	Antrim	2–8	14	2	7.00
8	Gregory O'Kane	Antrim	1–12	15	3	5.00
9	Adrian Ronan	Kilkenny	1–11	14	6	2.33
10	Martin Storey	Kilkenny	0–13	13	4	3.25

=== Single game ===
Rank	Player	County	Tally	Total	Opposition
1	Olcan McFetridge	Antrim	2–7	13	Meath
2	Paul Flynn	Waterford	3–2	11	Kerry
2	Michael Cleary	Tipperary	3–2	11	Kerry
2	D. J. Carey	Kilkenny	2–5	11	Antrim
5	D. J. Carey	Kilkenny	2–4	10	Offaly
5	Cyril Lyons	Clare	2–4	10	Antrim
7	Eamon Morrissey	Kilkenny	2–3	9	Carlow
7	Eamon Morrissey	Kilkenny	2–3	9	Wexford
7	Tom Dempsey	Wexford	0–9	9	Kilkenny
10	Liam McCarthy	Kilkenny	1–5	8	Carlow
10	D. J. Carey	Kilkenny	1–5	8	Wexford
10	D. J. Leahy	Kerry	2–2	8	Waterford
10	Ger O'Loughlin	Clare	1–5	8	Limerick
10	Michael Cleary	Tipperary	0–8	8	Galway
