= Eamon Morrissey (hurler) =

Irish hurler

Personal information
- Native name: Éamonn Ó Muireasa (Irish)
- Nickname: Yommie
- Born: 22 March 1966 (age 60) Muckalee, County Kilkenny, Ireland
- Occupation: Quantity surveyor
- Height: 6 ft 0 in (183 cm)

Sport
- Sport: Hurling
- Position: Right corner-forward
Clubs
- Years: Club
- 1970 - 1983 1984 - 1995 1996 - 1998: O'Loughlin Gaels; St Martin's; O'Toole's
Club titles
- Kilkenny titles: 1; 2 (Dublin)
- Leinster titles: 1
- All-Ireland Titles: 1
Inter-county
Years	County	Apps (scores)
1989 - 1995 1996 - 1998	Kilkenny; Dublin	19 (10-42); 4 (2-09)
Inter-county titles
- Leinster titles: 3
- All-Irelands: 2
- NHL: 2
- All Stars: 1

Eamon Morrissey (born 22 March 1966) is an Irish former hurler. At club level he played with O'Loughlin Gaels, St Martin's and O'Toole's and was also a member of the Kilkenny and Dublin senior hurling teams. He usually lined out as a forward.

== Career ==
Morrissey first came to prominence at juvenile and underage levels with the St Martin's club while simultaneously lining out with the St Kieran's College team that lost the All-Ireland final in 1984. As a member of the St Martin's senior team he came on as a substitute for their All-Ireland Club Championship success in 1985. Morrissey first appeared on the inter-county scene with the Kilkenny minor team that lost the All-Ireland final to Limerick in 1984, before losing the All-Ireland under-21 final to Tipperary the following year. He was drafted onto the Kilkenny senior hurling team in 1989. Morrissey would go on to line out in three consecutive All-Ireland finals at senior level and, after defeat by Tipperary in 1991, claimed consecutive winners' medals against Cork in 1992 and Galway in 1993. He transferred to the O'Toole's club in Dublin in 1996 and won consecutive County Senior Championship titles before a three-year stint with the Dublin senior hurling team. Morrissey's other honours include two National League titles, three Leinster Championship medals and a Railway Cup medals with Leinster.

== Honours ==
=== Team ===
St Kieran's College

- Leinster Colleges Senior Hurling Championship: 1984

St Martin's

- All-Ireland Senior Club Hurling Championship: 1985
- Leinster Senior Club Hurling Championship: 1985
- Kilkenny Senior Hurling Championship: 1984

O'Toole's

- Dublin Senior Hurling Championship: 1996, 1997

Kilkenny

- All-Ireland Senior Hurling Championship: 1992, 1993
- Leinster Senior Hurling Championship: 1991, 1992, 1993
- National Hurling League: 1989-90, 1994-95
- Leinster Under-21 Hurling Championship: 1985
- Leinster Minor Hurling Championship: 1984

Leinster

- Railway Cup: 1988, 1993

=== Individual ===
Awards

- All-Star Award: 1990
