= 1998 Munster Senior Hurling Championship final =

- Event: 1998 Munster Senior Hurling Championship
Clare	Waterford
1-16	3-10
- Date: 12 July 1998
- Venue: Semple Stadium, Thurles
- Referee: Willie Barrett
- Attendance: 51,417
- Weather: Showers

The 1998 Munster Senior Hurling Championship final (sponsored by Guinness) was a hurling match played on 12 July 1998 at Semple Stadium, Thurles, County Tipperary. It was contested by Clare and Waterford.

The final finished in a draw, with a scoreline of 1-16 for Clare, 3-10 for Waterford. Clare, captained by Anthony Daly and managed by Ger Loughnane, won the replay a week later on a scoreline of 2-16 to 0-10. Both matches were shown live in Ireland as part of The Sunday Game Live on RTÉ Two.

== Drawn match ==
=== Summary ===
In the drawn game on 12 July, Waterford struggled to keep in touch with Clare, who were All-Ireland champions for two of the previous three years. Paul Flynn fired a free to the net with the match entering injury time to level the scores, Waterford had an opportunity to win it from a 100 metre free but Paul Flynn's effort drifted wide.

=== Details ===
12 July
Final

Clare	1-16 – 3-10	Waterford
J. O'Connor (0-7), A. Markham (1-0), P. J. O'Connell (0-2), E. Taaffe (0-2), A. Daly (0-1), O. Baker (0-1), D. Forde (0-1), N. Gilligan (0-1), C. Clancy (0-1).	(Report)	A. Kirwan (2-1), P. Flynn (1-2), T. Browne (0-3), D. Shanahan (0-3), M. White (0-1).

Semple Stadium, Thurles
Attendance: 51,417
Referee: Willie Barrett (Tipperary)

== Replay ==
=== Summary ===
The replay was one of the most controversial games of hurling ever played. Before the sliotar had even been thrown in, Colin Lynch was pulling recklessly across Peter Queally and Tony Browne. A melee ensued two minutes into the game and Lynch punched Browne. Brian Lohan and Michael White were red-carded for also fighting. The rest of the game was played in an extremely bad spirit and Clare emerged the victors by 2–16 to 0–10. The Munster Council later suspended Colin Lynch for three months. He was a huge loss for the subsequent three-game All-Ireland semi-final saga with Offaly, a marathon run of games which Clare eventually lost, thus surrendering an All-Ireland title which they had been hot favourites to retain.

=== Details ===
1998 Munster Senior Hurling Championship final replay
- Event: 1998 Munster Senior Hurling Championship
Clare	Waterford
2-16	0-10
- Date: 19 July 1998
- Venue: Semple Stadium, Thurles
- Referee: Willie Barrett
- Attendance: 51,731
- Weather: Dull

19 July
Final Replay

Clare	2-16 – 0-10	Waterford
N. Gilligan (1-1), S. McMahon (0-4), J. O'Connor (0-4), C. Clancy (1-0), D. Forde (0-2), A. Markham (0-1), F. Hegarty (0-1), G. O'Loughlin (0-1), C. Lynch (0-1), O. Baker (0-1).	(Report)	P. Flynn (0-4), D. Bennett (0-2), K. McGrath (0-1), A. Kirwan (0-1), S. Daly (0-1), P. Queally (0-1).

Semple Stadium, Thurles
Attendance: 51,731
Referee: Willie Barrett (Tipperary)
