= Terence Murray =

Terence Murray may refer to:

- Terence Aubrey Murray (1810–1873), Australian pastoralist and parliamentarian
- Terence Murray (referee), Irish hurling referee
