= Liam McCarthy (hurler) =

Irish hurler

Personal information
- Native name: Liam Mac Cárthaigh (Irish)
- Born: 2 March 1963 (age 63) Piltown, County Kilkenny, Ireland
- Occupation: Technician
- Height: 5 ft 10 in (178 cm)

Sport
- Sport: Hurling
- Position: Left corner-forward
Club
- Years: Club
- Piltown
Club titles
- Kilkenny titles: 0
Inter-county
Years	County	Apps (scores)
1985-1994	Kilkenny	22 (6-31)
Inter-county titles
- Leinster titles: 4
- All-Irelands: 2
- NHL: 2
- All Stars: 0

Liam McCarthy (born 2 March 1963) is an Irish former hurler. At club level he played with Piltown and was also a member of the Kilkenny senior hurling team. He usually lined out in the forwards.

== Career ==
McCarthy first came to prominence at juvenile and underage levels with the Piltown club before quickly joining the club's top adult team. He enjoyed his first success in 1981 when Piltown won the County Junior Championship before claiming a second junior title in 1996. McCarthy first appeared on the inter-county scene as part of the Kilkenny team that won the All-Ireland Minor Championship title in 1981. He later won an All-Ireland Under-21 Championship title in 1984 as well as an All-Ireland Junior Championship title. McCarthy's underage successes saw him drafted onto the Kilkenny senior hurling team in 1985, however, injury kept him off the team the following year. He would go on to line out in four All-Ireland finals in seven seasons at senior level and, after defeat by Galway in 1987 and Tipperary in 1991, claimed consecutive winners' medals against Cork in 1992 and Galway in 1993. McCarthy's other honours include two National League titles, four Leinster Championship medals and a Railway Cup medal with Leinster.

== Honours ==
Piltown

- Kilkenny Junior Hurling Championship: 1981, 1996

Kilkenny

- All-Ireland Senior Hurling Championship: 1992, 1993
- Leinster Senior Hurling Championship: 1987, 1991, 1992, 1993
- National Hurling League: 1985-86, 1989-90
- All-Ireland Junior Hurling Championship: 1986
- Leinster Junior Hurling Championship: 1986
- All-Ireland Under-21 Hurling Championship: 1984
- Leinster Under-21 Hurling Championship: 1982, 1984
- All-Ireland Minor Hurling Championship: 1981
- Leinster Minor Hurling Championship: 1981

Leinster

- Railway Cup: 1993
