= 1993 Munster Senior Hurling Championship final =

Hurling match

- Event: 1993 Munster Senior Hurling Championship
Tipperary	Clare
3-27	2-12
- Date: 4 July 1993
- Venue: Gaelic Grounds, Limerick
- Referee: Terence Murray (Limerick)
- Attendance: 41,557
- Weather: Sunny

The 1993 Munster Senior Hurling Championship final was a hurling match played on Sunday 4 July 1993 at the Gaelic Grounds in Limerick. It was contested by Tipperary and Clare. Tipperary, captained by Michael O'Meara and managed by Babs Keating, won the game by 3-27 to 2-12. Tipperary played the game in yellow jerseys, with Clare wearing blue jerseys.

== Match ==
=== Summary ===
The match has become known for the moment when Nicky English smiled after scoring a point for Tipperary late in the second half. Clare accused him of laughing at them as Tipperary ran out easy winners. English denied that he had laughed and that it was just an innocent smile to Declan Ryan, who had delayed the initial pass to him.

=== Details ===
4 July 1993
Final

Tipperary	3-27 – 2-12	Clare
M. Cleary (1-4), J. Leahy (1-4), A. Crosse (1-4), A. Ryan (0-5), P. Fox (0-3), N. English (0-3), D. Ryan (0-3), Colm Bonnar (0-1).		C. Lyons (1-1), J. O'Connor (0-4), J. McInerney (1-0), J. Chaplin (0-2), F. Tuohy (0-2), G. O'Loughlin (0-1), J. O'Connell (0-1), P. Markham (0-1).

Gaelic Grounds, Limerick
Attendance: 41,557
Referee: Terence Murray (Limerick)

== See also ==
- Clare–Tipperary hurling rivalry
