= 1991 Munster Senior Hurling Championship final =

- Event: 1991 Munster Senior Hurling Championship
Cork	Tipperary
4-10	2-16
- Date: 7 July 1991
- Venue: Páirc Uí Chaoimh, Cork
- Referee: Terence Murray (Limerick)
- Attendance: 46,695
- Weather: Dry

The 1991 Munster Senior Hurling Championship final was a hurling match played on 7 July 1991 at Páirc Uí Chaoimh, Cork. It was contested by Cork and Tipperary.

Highlights of both games were shown as part of The Sunday Game programme on RTÉ 2 on the Sunday night. The programmes were presented by Michael Lyster, with commentary by Ger Canning.

== Drawn match ==
=== Summary ===
The final finished in a draw with a scoreline of 4-10 to 2-16.

=== Details ===
7 July
Final

Cork	4-10 – 2-16	Tipperary
G. FitzGerald (2-0), K. Hennessy (1-2), J. Fitzgibbon (1-2), T. O'Sullivan (0-3), C. Casey (0-2), P. Buckley (0-1).		M. Cleary (0-8), P. Fox (1-3), J. Leahy (1-1), Cormac Bonnar (0-1), N. English (0-1), A. Ryan (0-1), D. Ryan (0-1).

Páirc Uí Chaoimh, Cork
Attendance: 46,695
Referee: Terence Murray (Limerick)

== Replay ==
1991 Munster Senior Hurling Championship final replay
- Event: 1991 Munster Senior Hurling Championship
Tipperary	Cork
4-19	4-15
- Date: 21 July 1991
- Venue: Semple Stadium, Thurles
- Referee: Terence Murray (Limerick)
- Attendance: 55,000
- Weather: Dry

=== Summary ===
Tipperary, captained by Declan Carr and managed by Babs Keating, won the replay by 4-19 to 4-15 on 21 July in Semple Stadium, after coming back from nine points down, Cork had led by 3-13 to 1-10 with just a quarter of the game remaining. Aidan Ryan's late goal into the corner of the net sparked a pitch invasion from the Killinan End. Cork has a 2-8 to 1-7 lead at halftime in the replay.

The replay was described by the Irish Independent in 2014 and 2015 as one of the best games of hurling ever to be played.

=== Details ===
21 July
Final
replay

Tipperary	4-19 – 4-15	Cork
M. Cleary (1-7), P. Fox (1-5), A. Ryan (1-1), D. Carr (1-1), D. Ryan (0-2), J. Leahy (0-2), Cormac Bonnar (0-1).		J. Fitzgibbon (2-1), T. O'Sullivan (0-6), G. FitzGerald (1-2), K. Hennessy (1-0), J. Cashman (0-3), T. Mulcahy (0-1), P. Buckley (0-1), C. Casey (0-1).

Semple Stadium, Thurles
Attendance: 55,000
Referee: Terence Murray (Limerick)
