= 1988 Munster Senior Hurling Championship final =

- Event: 1988 Munster Senior Hurling Championship
Tipperary	Cork
2-19	1-13
- Date: 17 July 1988
- Venue: Gaelic Grounds, Limerick
- Referee: Terence Murray
- Attendance: 50,000

The 1988 Munster Senior Hurling Championship final was a hurling match played on Sunday 17 July 1988 at Gaelic Grounds, Limerick. It was contested by Cork and Tipperary. Tipperary, captained by Pat O'Neill, retained the title, beating Cork on a scoreline of 2–19 to 1–13.

== Match ==
=== Details ===
17 July
Final

Tipperary	2-19 – 1-13	Cork
N. English (0-9), D. Ryan (1-1), Cormac Bonnar (1-0), P. Delaney (0-3), J. Hayes (0-2), D. O'Connell (0-2), A. Ryan (0-2).		P. Horgan (1-4), T. O'Sullivan (0-5), P. O'Connor (0-2), G. FitzGerald (0-1), T. McCarthy (0-1).

Gaelic Grounds, Limerick
Attendance: 50,000
Referee: Terence Murray (Limerick)
