= 1987 Munster Senior Hurling Championship final =

- Event: 1987 Munster Senior Hurling Championship
Tipperary	Cork
1-18	1-18
- Date: 12 July 1987
- Venue: Semple Stadium, Thurles
- Referee: Terence Murray (Limerick)
- Attendance: 56,005
- Weather: Showers

The 1987 Munster Senior Hurling Championship final was a hurling match played on 12 July 1987 at Semple Stadium, Thurles, County Tipperary. It was contested by Tipperary and Cork. The final finished in a draw, with a scoreline of 1-18 each. Tipperary, captained by Richard Stakelum and managed by Babs Keating, won the replay by 4–22 to 1–22 (after extra-time) a week later in Killarney, to claim their first Munster Senior title since 1971.

Highlights of both games were shown as part of The Sunday Game programme on RTÉ 2 on the Sunday night. The programmes were presented by Michael Lyster, with commentary by Ger Canning.

== Drawn match ==
=== Summary ===
The first drawn game is notable as the game that Nicky English kicked the ball to the net soccer style after dropping his hurley.

=== Details ===
12 July
Final

Tipperary	1-18 – 1-18	Cork
P. Fox (0-9), N. English (1-1), D. O'Donnell (0-4), A. Ryan (0-2), R. Stakelum (0-1), J. McGrath (0-1).	Report	J. Fenton (0-12), T. O'Sullivan (0-4), K. Kingston (1-0), K. Hennessy (0-1), T. McCarthy (0-1).

Semple Stadium, Thurles
Attendance: 56,005
Referee: Terence Murray (Limerick)

== Replay ==
=== Summary ===
In the replay Michael Doyle was the hero, coming on as a substitute to score two goals. On accepting the cup at the end of the game, captain Richard Stakelum gave his famous the famine is over speech.

Nicky English, speaking in 2012, still rated the victory as his greatest, saying "The reason it was so special was that a number of us had been on the team for a long time, I was there since 1982. We had already had our disappointments in Munster finals in 1984 and 1985 and that Cork side still had the remnants of the three-in-a-row side and for us to get over Cork was a major thing for us and a major progression really".

=== Details ===
1987 Munster Senior Hurling Championship final replay
- Event: 1987 Munster Senior Hurling Championship
Tipperary	Cork
4-22	1-22
- Date: 19 July 1987
- Venue: Fitzgerald Stadium, Killarney
- Referee: Terence Murray (Limerick)
- Attendance: 45,000
- Weather: Dull

19 July
Final replay

Tipperary	4-22 – 1-22 (AET)	Cork
P. Fox (0-11), M. Doyle (2-0), N. English (1-1), D. O'Connell (1-1), M. McGrath (0-3), A. Ryan (0-3), P. Delaney (0-2), P. Fitzelle (0-1).	Report	J. Fenton (0-13), T. Mulcahy (1-2), T. McCarthy (0-3), T. O'Sullivan (0-3), G. FitzGerald (0-1).

FitzGerald Stadium, Killarney
Attendance: 45,000
Referee: Terence Murray (Limerick)
