= Pat Horan =

Irish hurling referee

Pat Horan is an Irish hurling referee. A native of County Offaly he was one of the sport's top referees throughout the 1990s. Horan officiated at several All-Ireland finals in minor, under-21 and senior levels.

His choice to officiate the 2004 All-Ireland Senior Hurling Championship quarter-final replay between Clare and Kilkenny was controversial.

Horan has also given his opinions during hurling controversies.

Achievements
Preceded by Willie Barrett	All-Ireland MHC Final referee 1991	Succeeded by Terence Murray
Preceded by John McDonnell; Pat O'Connor; Ger Harrington	All-Ireland U-21 HC Final referee 1994; 1997; 2000	Succeeded by Terence Murray; Dickie Murphy; Aodán Mac Suibhne
Preceded by Dickie Murphy	All-Ireland SHC Final referee 1996	Succeeded by Dickie Murphy
