= 1989–90 National Hurling League =

59th season of the National Hurling League

The 1989–90 season was the 59th completed season of the National Hurling League, the top league for inter-county hurling teams, since its establishment in 1925. The fixtures were announced on 19 September 1989. The season began on 14 October 1989 and concluded on 6 May 1990.

== Division 1 ==
National Hurling League Division 1
- Season: 1989–90
- Champions: Kilkenny; 8th National League title Captain: Kevin Fennelly; Manager: Dermot Healy
- Relegated: Antrim; Galway
- Matches played: 35
- Top goalscorer: D. J. Carey (1-52)
- Biggest home win: Limerick 5-12 - 1-6 Antrim (26 November 1989)
- Biggest away win: Cork 6-16 - 2-10 Antrim (18 February 1990)
- Highest scoring: Cork 6-16 - 2-10 Antrim (18 February 1990)

Galway came into the season as defending champions of the 1988-89 season. Dublin and Cork entered Division 1 as the two promoted teams.

On 6 May 1990, Kilkenny won the title after an 0-18 to 0-9 win over New York. It was their first league title since 1986 and their eighth National League title overall.

Antrim were the first team to be relegated after losing all of their group stage games, while Galway suffered the same fate after losing to Wexford in the final round of the group stage.

Kilkenny's D. J. Carey finished the season as top scorer with 1-52.

=== Table ===
Pos	Team	Pld	W	D	L	Pts	Notes
1	Cork	7	5	1	1	11	
2	Kilkenny	7	4	2	1	10	Division 1 champions
3	Dublin	7	5	0	2	10	
4	Wexford	7	5	0	2	10	
5	Limerick	7	3	0	4	6	
6	Tipperary	7	2	1	4	5	
7	Galway	7	2	0	5	4	Relegated to Division 2
8	Antrim	7	0	0	7	0	Relegated to Division 2

=== Group stage ===
14 October 1989 Round 1	Cork	1-12 - 0-13	Galway	Páirc Uí Chaoimh, Cork
	K Hennessy 1-3, T McCarthy 0-2, K McGuckin 0-2, J Cashman 0-1, G O'Connell 0-1, K Kingston 0-1, P O'Connor 0-1, J Fitzgibbon 0-1.		G Burke 0-7, A Cunningham 0-2, P Killilea 0-2, P Dolan 0-1, P Malone 0-1.	Referee: J Moore (Waterford)

15 October 1989 Round 1	Limerick	1-11 - 2-10	Wexford	Gaelic Grounds, Limerick
	G Kirby 0-5, S Fitzgibbon 1-0, C Carey 0-1, P Mulqueen 0-1, D Nash 0-1, G Hegarty 0-1, P Davoren 0-1, M Galligan 0-1.		B Byrne 1-1, M Morrissey 1-0, M Storey 0-3, J Houlihan 0-2, E Sinnott 0-1, G Flood 0-1, G O'Connor 0-1, L O'Gorman 0-1.	Referee: W Horgan (Cork)

15 October 1989 Round 1	Antrim	2-8 - 0-20	Kilkenny	Casement Park, Belfast
	C Barr 1-0, B Donnelly 1-0, O McFetridge 0-3, G Holden 0-1, D Armstrong 0-1, T McNaughton 0-1, P McKillen 0-1, A McCarry 0-1.		DJ Carey 0-10, L Ryan 0-3, A Ronan 0-3, A Prendergast 0-2, R Power 0-1, E Morrison 0-1.	Referee: P Delaney (Laois)

15 October 1989 Round 1	Dublin	1-10 - 1-9	Tipperary	Croke Park, Dublin
	A Doyle 1-0, B McMahon 0-3, MJ Ryan 0-3, K Hetherton 0-2, R Boland 0-1, J Lyng 0-1.		M Cleary 0-5, Cormac Bonnar 1-0, A Ryan 0-1, P Everard 0-1, J Cormack 0-1, P McGrath 0-1.	Referee: P Long (Kilkenny)

29 October 1989 Round 2	Galway	1-15 - 2-16	Dublin	Pearse Stadium, Galway
	J Cooney 0-7, É Ryan 1-1, T Monaghan 0-3, M Kenny 0-3, M McGrath 0-1.		MJ Ryan 1-2, R Boland 1-0, B McMahon 0-3, J Murphy 0-3, K Hetherton 0-3, S McDermott 0-3, S Dalton 0-2.	Referee: G Ryan (Tipperary)

29 October 1989 Round 2	Tipperary	0-15 - 5-8	Cork	Semple Stadium, Thurles
	J Leahy 0-5, J Madden 0-2, D Ryan 0-2, A Ryan 0-2, M Cleary 0-2, Cormac Bonnar 0-1, D Carr 0-1.		K Hennessy 3-1, J Fitzgibbon 2-1, K McGuckin 0-3, T O'Sullivan 0-2, J Buckley 0-1.	Referee: P Delaney (Laois)

29 October 1989 Round 2	Wexford	2-10 - 3-6	Antrim	Wexford Park, Wexford
	J Houlihan 1-5, T Dempsey 1-0, J O'Connor 0-3, L O'Gorman 0-2.		G Holden 1-3, T McNaughton 1-0, D Armstrong 1-0, S Calwell 0-2, C Murphy 0-1.	Referee: J Moore (Waterford)

29 October 1989 Round 2	Kilkenny	2-17 - 2-11	Limerick	Nowlan Park, Kilkenny
	É Morrissey 1-2, L McCarthy 1-2, DJ Carey 0-4, R Power 0-2, T O'Keeffe 0-2, M Cleere 0-2, T Murphy 0-2, L Ryan 0-1.		G Kirby 2-2, D O'Neill 0-3, G Hegarty 0-2, M Reale 0-1, M Holohan 0-1, T Kenny 0-1, L O'Connor 0-1.	Referee: W Horgan (Cork)

12 November 1989 Round 3	Kilkenny	0-11 - 1-9	Dublin	John Locke Park, Callan
	DJ Carey 0-5, J McDonald 0-1, A Ronan 0-1, Morrissey 0-1, M Cleere 0-1, R Power 0-1, T Murphy 0-1.		K Hetherton 1-1, MJ Ryan 0-4, S McDermott 0-3, B McMahon 0-1.	Referee: W Horgan (Cork)

12 November 1989 Round 3	Antrim	1-11 - 0-15	Tipperary	Casement Park, Belfast
	B Donnelly 1-2, A Carry 0-5, J Close 0-2, C Murphy 0-1, S McKillop 0-1.		M Cleary 0-8, A Buckley 0-3, D Ryan 0-1, C Stakelum 0-1, D Carr 0-1, P Everard 0-1.

12 November 1989 Round 3	Cork	2-13 - 0-15	Wexford	Páirc Uí Chaoimh, Cork
	K Hennessy 0-6, T McCarthy 1-1, J Fitzgibbon 1-0, T O'Sullivan 0-3, G Fitzgerald 0-2, D Quirke 0-1.		J O'Connor 0-3, M Storey 0-3, J Houlihan 0-3, M Morrissey 0-2, R Coleman 0-1, T Dempsey 0-1, L O'Gorman 0-1, G O'Connor 0-1.	Referee: W Barrett (Tipperary)

12 November 1989 Round 3	Galway	1-22 - 1-11	Limerick	Dunlo GAA Grounds, Ballinasloe
	J Cooney 0-10, S Dolan 1-1, Michael McGrath 0-4, É Ryan 0-4, G Burke 0-1, M Kenny 0-1, A Cunningham 0-1.		G Kirby 0-6, G Hegarty 1-0, M Nelligan 0-2, S Fitzgibbon 0-1, D Fitzgerald 0-1, C Carey 0-1.	Referee: P Delaney (Laois)

26 November 1989 Round 4	Tipperary	1-14 - 0-11	Galway	Semple Stadium, Thurles
	M Cleary 0-6, Cormac Bonnar 1-0, J Leahy 0-3, D Carr 0-2, N English 0-1, B Ryan 0-1, J Hayes 0-1.		J Cooney 0-9, É Ryan 0-1, S Dolan 0-1.

26 November 1989 Round 4	Dublin	2-10 - 2-8	Cork	Croke Park, Dublin
	MJ Ryan 1-3, B McMahon 1-0, S Dalton 0-3, D Finn 0-2, S Kearns 0-1, J Lyng 0-1.		T Mulcahy 1-1, K Hennessy 1-0, D Quirke 0-3, T O'Sullivan 0-3, A O'Sullivan 0-1.	Referee: J Denton (Wexford)

26 November 1989 Round 4	Wexford	0-11 - 1-11	Kilkenny	Wexford Park, Wexford
	M Storey 0-4, J Houlihan 0-4, M Morrissey 0-1, S Wickham 0-1, J O'Connor 0-1.		É Morrissey 0-5, J McDonald 1-0, M Cleere 0-2, J Power 0-1, L McCarthy 0-1, L Ryan 0-1, R Power 0-1.	Referee: W Barrett (Tipperary)

26 November 1989 Round 4	Limerick	5-12 - 1-6	Antrim	Gaelic Grounds, Limerick
	S Fitzgibbon 2-1, T Kenny 1-2, G Hegarty 0-4, L O'Connor 1-0, G Kirby 1-0, P Davoren 0-3, O O'Connor 0-1, M Houlihan 0-1.		A McCarry 1-0, C Barr 0-2, S Cauldwell 0-2, J Close 0-1, D Armstrong 0-1.	Referee: P Long (Kilkenny)

18 February 1990 Round 5	Kilkenny	5-12 - 0-10	Galway	Nowlan Park, Kilkenny
	É Morrissey 2-2, J McDonald 2-0, G Heffernan 1-2, DJ Carey 0-4, R Power 0-2, L Ryan 0-2.		M McGrath 0-7, J Cooney 0-1, R Duane 0-1, T Mannion 0-1.	Referee: P Delaney (Laois)

18 February 1990 Round 5	Limerick	0-13 - 0-4	Dublin	Gaelic Grounds, Limerick
	G Kirby 0-4, M Galligan 0-2, G Hegarty 0-2, S Fitzgibbon 0-2, P Davoren 0-1, T Kenny 0-1, M Houlihan 0-1.		K Hetherton 0-3, B McMahon 0-1.

18 February 1990 Round 5	Antrim	2-10 - 6-16	Cork	Casement Park, Belfast
	O McFetridge 0-5, T McNaughton 1-1, A McCarry 1-0, P McKillen 0-2, C Barr 0-1, B Donnelly 0-1.		G Fitzgerald 4-2, K Hennessy 2-1, T O'Sullivan 0-5, T Mulcahy 0-3, A O'Sullivan 0-3, T McCarthy 0-1, S McCarthy 0-1.	Referee: P Long (Kilkenny)

18 February 1990 Round 5	Wexford	0-13 - 0-9	Tipperary	St. Patrick's Park, Enniscorthy
	J Holohan 0-4, S Fitzhenry 0-3, T Dempsey 0-1, B Byrne 0-1, J O'Connor 0-1, G O'Connor 0-1, M Storey 0-1, R Coleman 0-1.		M Cleary 0-6, C Stakelum 0-2, J Madden 0-1.

25 February 1990 Round 6	Cork	1-10 - 0-13	Kilkenny	Páirc Uí Chaoimh, Cork
	G Fitzgerald 1-0, A O'Sullivan 0-5, J Fitzgibbon 0-3, T O'Sullivan 0-3,		DJ Carey 0-5, L Ryan 0-2, É Morrissey 0-2, M Phelan 0-2, J McDonald 0-1, M Cleere 0-1.	Referee: T Murray (Limerick)

25 February 1990 Round 6	Dublin	1-10 - 2-10	Wexford	Croke Park, Dublin
	B McMahon 1-3, S Dalton 0-3, R Boland 0-1, D Finn 0-1, K Hetherton 0-1, S Fleming 0-1.		T Dempsey 1-2, B Byrne 1-1, J Houlihan 0-2, J O'Connor 0-2, R Coleman 0-2, S Fitzhenry 0-1.	Referee: P Delaney (Laois)

25 February 1990 Round 6	Tipperary	1-14 - 3-12	Limerick	Semple Stadium, Thurles
	M Cleary 0-9, A Buckley 1-1, D O'Connell 0-2, D Carr 0-1, K Hogan 0-1.		T Kenny 3-0, G Kirby 0-9, P Davoren 0-1, G Hegarty 0-1, M Galligan 0-1.	Referee: D Murphy (Wexford)

25 February 1990 Round 6	Galway	3-9 - 1-3	Antrim	Dunlo GAA Grounds, Ballinasloe
	M McGrath 1-5, G Burke 2-0, J Cooney 0-2, É Ryan 0-1, P Malone 0-1.		T McNaughton 1-1, P McKillen 0-2.	Referee: G Long (Tipperary)

11 March 1990 Round 7	Kilkenny	1-12 - 2-9	Tipperary	Nowlan Park, Kilkenny
	DJ Carey 0-5, J McDonald 1-1, M Cleere 0-3, R Power 0-1, T Murphy 0-1, C Heffernan 0-1.		Cormac Bonnar 1-1, C Stakelum 1-0, M Cleary 0-3, D Carr 0-2, A Ryan 0-1, N English 0-1, P Delaney 0-1.	Referee: T Murray (Limerick)

11 March 1990 Round 7	Antrim	0-9 - 3-10	Dublin	Casement Park, Belfast
	O McFetridge 0-3, C Barr 0-2, SP McKillop 0-2, C Murphy 0-1, G Holden 0-1.		B McMahon 2-2, J Murphy 1-0, S Fleming 0-3, S Dalton 0-2, MJ Ryan 0-1, C Hetherton 0-1, D Finn 0-1.	Referee: P Horan (Offaly)

11 March 1990 Round 7	Wexford	2-11 - 1-13	Galway	O'Kennedy Park, New Ross
	M Storey 1-1, M Reck 1-1, J Holohan 0-4, T Dempsey 0-2, R Coleman 0-1, S Fitzhenry 0-1, G O'Connor 0-1.		M McGrath 0-8, S Dolan 1-1, J Cooney 0-3, P Higgins 0-1.	Referee: W Horgan (Cork)

11 March 1990 Round 7	Limerick	1-16 - 4-9	Cork	FitzGerald Park, Kilmallock
	G Kirby 1-9, S Fitzgibbon 0-3, C Carey 0-2, P Heffernan 0-1, D Flynn 0-1.		T Mulcahy 2-1, K Hennessy 1-1, J Fitzgibbon 1-0, S McCarthy 0-2, M Mullins 0-2, T O'Sullivan 0-2, J Cashman 0-1.	Referee: P Delaney (Laois)

=== Knock-out stage ===
Quarter-finals

25 March 1990 Quarter-final	Dublin	1-15 - 2-7	Waterford	Semple Stadium, Thurles
	B McMahon 1-6, MJ Ryan 0-3, S Dalton 0-2, S Kearns 0-1, S McDermott 0-1, K Hetherton 0-1, D Finn 0-1.		M O'Keeffe 2-0, K Delahunty 0-6, D Byrne 0-1.	Referee: P Delaney (Laois)

25 March 1990 Quarter-final	Wexford	0-17 - 1-10	Clare	Semple Stadium, Thurles
	J Holohan 0-6, R Coleman 0-4, T Dempsey 0-4, G O'Connor 0-1, M Storey 0-1, B Byrne 0-1.		M Guilfoyle 1-1, T Guilfoyle 0-3, F Carrick 0-2, M Nugent 0-2, G McInerney 0-2.	Referee: W Barrett (Tipperary)

Semi-finals

8 April 1990 Semi-final	Wexford	2-12 - 2-12	Cork	Semple Stadium, Thurles
	J Holohan 2-4, M Storey 0-3, T Dempsey 0-2, M Reck 0-1, R Coleman 0-1, S Fitzhenry 0-1.		G Fitzgerald 1-2, K Hennessy 1-1, B Cunningham 0-4, T Mulcahy 0-2, S O'Gorman 0-1, T O'Sullivan 0-1, T McCarthy 0-1.	Referee: P Delaney (Laois)

8 April 1990 Semi-final	Kilkenny	2-16 - 1-9	Dublin	Semple Stadium, Thurles
	É Morrissey 2-2, DJ Carey 0-5, J McDonald 0-3, C Heffernan 0-2, L Fennelly 0-2, R Power 0-1, M Phelan 0-1.		C Hetherton 1-0, B McMahon 0-2, S Dalton 0-2, MJ Ryan 0-2, S Fleming 0-2, J Murphy 0-1.	Referee: T Murray (Limerick)

16 April 1990 Semi-final replay	Wexford	1-9 - 0-6	Cork	Nowlan Park, Kilkenny
	M Storey 1-2, J Holohan 0-3, T Dempsey 0-2, R Coleman 0-1, J O'Connor 0-1.		P Buckley 0-1, T McCarthy 0-1, J Fitzgibbon 0-1, M Foley 0-1, B Cunningham 0-1, S McCarthy 0-1.	Referee: P Delaney (Laois)

Home final

22 April 1990 Home final	Kilkenny	3-12 - 1-10	Wexford	Croke Park, Dublin
	É Morrissey 2-3, DJ Carey 1-4, C Heffernan 0-2, L Fennelly 0-1, J McDonald 0-1, M Cleere 0-1.		T Dempsey 1-0, J Holohan 0-3, M Storey 0-3, M Reck 0-2, L Dunne 0-2,	Referee: W Barrett (Tipperary)

Final

6 May 1990 Final	New York	0-9 - 0-18	Kilkenny	Gaelic Park, New York City
	R Sampson 0-3, H Ryan 0-2, J McInerney 0-1, B Keeshin 0-1, S O'Donoghue 0-1, I Conroy 0-1.		DJ Carey 0-10, L McCarthy 0-3, É Morrissey 0-2, C Heffernan 0-1, J McDonald 0-1, P Dwyer 0-1.	Referee: W Horgan (Cork)

=== Top scorers ===
Top scorer overall

Rank	Player	Team	Tally	Total	Matches	Average
1	D. J. Carey	Kilkenny	1-52	55	9	6.1
2	Jimmy Holohan	Wexford	3-40	49	11	4.45
3	Gary Kirby	Limerick	4-35	47	7	6.7
4	Kevin Hennessy	Cork	9-13	40	7	5.7
5	Éamonn Morrissey	Kilkenny	7-19	40		
6	Michael Cleary	Tipperary	0-39	39	7	5.5
7	Brian McMahon	Dublin	5-21	36	9	4.00
8	Joe Cooney	Galway	0-32	32		
9	Martin Storey	Wexford	2-21	27		
10	Ger FitzGerald	Cork	6-06	24		
10	Michael McGrath	Galway	1-21	24		

Top scorer in a single game

Rank	Player	Team	Tally	Total	Opposition
1	Ger FitzGerald	Cork	4-02	14	Antrim
2	Gary Kirby	Limerick	1-09	12	Cork
3	Kevin Hennessy	Cork	3-01	10	Tipperary
3	Jimmy Holohan	Wexford	2-04	10	Cork
3	D. J. Carey	Kilkenny	0-10	10	Antrim
3	Joe Cooney	Galway	0-10	10	Limerick
3	D. J. Carey	Kilkenny	0-10	10	New York
4	Terence Kenny	Limerick	3-00	9	Tipperary
4	Eamon Morrissey	Kilkenny	2-03	9	Wexford
4	Brian McMahon	Dublin	1-06	9	Waterford
4	Joe Cooney	Galway	0-09	9	Tipperary
4	Michael Cleary	Tipperary	0-09	9	Limerick
4	Gary Kirby	Limerick	0-09	9	Tipperary

== Division 2 ==
Pos	Team	Pld	W	D	L	Pts	Notes
1	Clare	7	6	1	0	13	Promoted to Division 1
2	Waterford	7	6	1	0	13	Promoted to Division 1
3	Offaly	7	4	1	2	9	
4	Meath	7	4	0	3	8	
5	Down	7	3	0	4	6	
6	Laois	7	2	1	4	5	
7	Westmeath	7	1	0	6	2	Relegated to Division 3
7	Carlow	7	0	0	7	0	Relegated to Division 3

15 October 1989 Round 1	Laois	3-7 - 1-19	Waterford	O'Moore Park, Portlaoise

15 October 1989 Round 1	Westmeath	1-5 - 2-18	Clare	Cusack Park, Mullingar

15 October 1989 Round 1	Carlow	1-7 - 1-16	Offaly	Dr. Cullen Park, Carlow

15 October 1989 Round 1	Down	1-13 - 3-9	Meath	Mitchel Park, Ballygalget

29 October 1989 Round 2	Meath	1-9 - 0-10	Laois	St. Loman's Park, Trim

29 October 1989 Round 2	Offaly	4-15 - 1-9	Westmeath	St. Brendan's Park, Birr

29 October 1989 Round 2	Waterford	2-11 - 2-4	Down	Walsh Park, Waterford

29 October 1989 Round 2	Clare	5-15 - 1-2	Carlow	Cusack Park, Ennis

12 November 1989 Round 3	Meath	1-9 - 1-12	Offaly	St. Loman's Park, Trim

12 November 1989 Round 3	Laois	2-13 - 0-6	Westmeath	O'Moore Park, Portlaoise

12 November 1989 Round 3	Waterford	1-14 - 3-8	Clare	Fraher Field, Dungarvan

12 November 1989 Round 3	Down	3-13 - 0-11	Carlow	McKenna Park, Ballycran

26 November 1989 Round 4	Offaly	1-11 - 1-6	Down	St. Brendan's Park, Birr

26 November 1989 Round 4	Clare	4-13 - 1-5	Laois	Cusack Park, Ennis

26 November 1989 Round 4	Westmeath	1-5 - 1-21	Waterford	Castletown Geoghegan

26 November 1989 Round 4	Carlow	2-6 - 3-11	Meath	Dr. Cullen Park, Carlow

19 February 1990 Round 5	Meath	2-11 - 0-12	Westmeath	Páirc Tailteann, Navan

19 February 1990 Round 5	Down	1-11 - 4-10	Clare	Mitchel Park, Ballygalget

19 February 1990 Round 5	Offaly	0-12 - 1-9	Laois	O'Connor Park, Tullamore

19 February 1990 Round 5	Carlow	0-13 - 1-13	Waterford	Dr. Cullen Park, Carlow

26 February 1990 Round 6	Waterford	4-8 - 2-6	Meath	Ardmore Sportsfield, Ardmore

26 February 1990 Round 6	Clare	1-9 - 0-10	Offaly	Cusack Park, Ennis

26 February 1990 Round 6	Laois	0-11 - 0-11	Down	O'Moore Park, Portlaoise

26 February 1990 Round 6	Westmeath	0-9 - 0-2	Carlow	Castletown Geoghegan

11 March 1990 Round 7	Waterford	4-8 - 1-9	Offaly	Walsh Park, Waterford

11 March 1990 Round 7	Down	4-8 - 1-12	Westmeath	McKenna Pqrk, Ballycran

11 March 1990 Round 7	Laois	5-16 - 1-2	Carlow	Kelly Daly Park, Rathdowney

11 March 1990 Round 7	Meath	1-8 - 2-10	Clare	St. Loman's Park, Trim

== Division 3 ==
Pos	Team	Pld	W	D	L	Pts	Notes
1	Kerry	7	6	1	0	13	Promoted to Division 2
2	Derry	7	5	1	1	11	Promoted to Division 2
3	Wicklow	7	5	0	2	10	
4	Kildare	7	4	0	3	8	
5	Roscommon	7	3	0	4	6	
6	Armagh	7	1	1	5	3	
7	Monaghan	7	1	1	5	3	
8	Mayo	7	0	5	7	0	Relegated to Division 4

== Division 4 ==
Pos	Team	Pld	W	D	L	Pts	Notes
1	Sligo	7	6	1	0	13	Promoted to Division 3
2	Fermanagh	7	5	1	1	11	
3	Tyrone	7	5	0	2	10	
4	Louth	7	4	0	3	8	
5	Longford	7	3	0	4	6	
6	Donegal	7	2	0	5	4	
7	Cavan	7	1	0	6	2	
8	Leitrim	7	1	0	6	2	
