= Aodán Mac Suibhne =

Irish hurling referee

Aodán Mac Suibhne is an Irish hurling referee. A member of the St Jude's club in Dublin he is regarded as one of the sport's top referees and has officiated at several All-Ireland finals in minor, under-21 and senior levels.

Achievements
Preceded by Seán McMahon	All-Ireland Minor Hurling Final referee 1994	Succeeded by Pat O'Connor
Preceded by Pat Horan	All-Ireland Under-21 Hurling Final referee 2001	Succeeded by Dickie Murphy
Preceded by Pat O'Connor; Pat O'Connor	All-Ireland Senior Hurling Final referee 2002; 2004	Succeeded by Pat O'Connor; Séamus Roche
