= 1992 All-Ireland Senior Hurling Championship =

Championship details
- Dates: 24 May – 6 September 1992
- Teams: 16

All-Ireland champions
- Winning team: Kilkenny (24th win)
- Captain: Liam Fennelly
- Manager: Ollie Walsh

All-Ireland Finalists
- Losing team: Cork
- Captain: Ger FitzGerald
- Manager: Fr. Michael O'Brien

Provincial champions
- Munster: Cork
- Leinster: Kilkenny
- Ulster: Down
- Connacht: Not Played

Championship statistics
- No. matches played: 16
- Top Scorer: D. J. Carey (3–23)
- Player of the Year: Brian Corcoran
- All-Star Team: See here

The All-Ireland Senior Hurling Championship of 1992 was the 106th staging of Ireland's premier hurling knock-out competition. Kilkenny won the championship, beating Cork 3–10 to 1–12 in the final at Croke Park, Dublin.

== Team changes ==
=== To Championship ===
Promoted from the All-Ireland Senior B Hurling Championship

- Carlow (qualified)

=== From Championship ===
Regraded to the All-Ireland Senior B Hurling Championship

- Westmeath

== Teams ==
=== General information ===
Sixteen counties will compete in the All-Ireland Senior Hurling Championship: one team from the Connacht Senior Hurling Championship, five teams in the Leinster Senior Hurling Championship, six teams in the Munster Senior Hurling Championship, three teams from the Ulster Senior Hurling Championship and one team from the All-Ireland Senior B Hurling Championship.

County	Last provincial title	Last championship title	Position in 1991 Championship	Current championship
Antrim	1991	—		Ulster Senior Hurling Championship
Carlow	—	—		All-Ireland Senior B Hurling Championship
Clare	1932	1914		Munster Senior Hurling Championship
Cork	1990	1990		Munster Senior Hurling Championship
Derry	1908	—		Ulster Senior Hurling Championship
Down	1942	—		Ulster Senior Hurling Championship
Dublin	1961	1938		Leinster Senior Hurling Championship
Galway	1922	1988		Connacht Senior Hurling Championship
Kerry	1891	1891		Munster Senior Hurling Championship
Kilkenny	1991	1983		Leinster Senior Hurling Championship
Laois	1949	1915		Leinster Senior Hurling Championship
Limerick	1981	1973		Munster Senior Hurling Championship
Offaly	1990	1985		Leinster Senior Hurling Championship
Tipperary	1991	1991		Munster Senior Hurling Championship
Waterford	1963	1959		Munster Senior Hurling Championship
Wexford	1977	1968		Leinster Senior Hurling Championship

=== Participating counties ===
County	Stadium
Dublin	Parnell Park
Kilkenny	Nowlan Park
Laois	O'Moore Park
Offaly	O'Connor Park
Wexford	Wexford Park
Clare	Cusack Park
Cork	Páirc Uí Chaoimh
Kerry	Austin Stack Park
Limerick	Gaelic Grounds
Tipperary	Semple Stadium
Waterford	Walsh Park
Galway	Pearse Stadium
Antrim	Casement Park
Derry	Celtic Park
Down	Páirc Esler

== Format ==
=== Leinster Championship ===
Match programme from the Leinster semi-finals

Quarter-final: (1 match) This is a lone match between the first two teams drawn from the province of Leinster. One team is eliminated at this stage, while the winners advance to the semi-finals.

Semi-finals: (2 matches) The winners of the lone quarter-final join three other Leinster teams to make up the semi-final pairings. Two teams are eliminated at this stage, while two teams advance to the final.

Final: (1 match) The winners of the two semi-finals contest this game. One team is eliminated at this stage, while the winners advance to the All-Ireland semi-final.

=== Ulster Championship ===
Semi-final: (1 match) This is a lone match between the first two teams drawn from the province of Ulster. One team is eliminated at this stage, while the winners advance to the final.

Final: (1 match) The winners of the lone quarter-final join another Ulster team to contest this game. One team is eliminated at this stage, while the winners advance to the All-Ireland semi-final.

=== Munster Championship ===
Quarter-final: (2 matches) These are two lone matches between the first four teams drawn from the province of Munster. Two teams are eliminated at this stage, while two teams advance to the semi-finals.

Semi-finals: (2 matches) The winners of the two quarter-finals join the other two Munster teams to make up the semi-final pairings. Two teams are eliminated at this stage, while two teams advance to the final.

Final: (1 match) The winners of the two semi-finals contest this game. One team is eliminated at this stage, while the winners advance to the All-Ireland semi-final.

=== All-Ireland Championship ===
Quarter-final: (1 match) This is a lone match between Galway and the All-Ireland 'B' champions. One team is eliminated at this stage, while the winners advance to the All-Ireland semi-final where they play the Leinster champions.

Semi-finals: (2 matches) The Munster and Leinster champions will play the winners of the lone quarter-final and the Ulster champions. The Munster and Leinster winners will be in opposite semi-finals. Two teams are eliminated at this stage, while the two winners advance to the All-Ireland final.

Final: (1 match) The two semi-final winners will contest the All-Ireland final.

== Provincial championships ==
=== Leinster Senior Hurling Championship ===
==== Bracket ====
Quarter-finals
Wexford	4–08
Laois	1–11

Semi-finals
Dublin	3–08
Wexford	3–16
Kilkenny	2–15
Offaly	1–12

Leinster final
Wexford	2–09
Kilkenny	3–16

==== Quarter-finals ====
May 31
Quarter-Final

Wexford	4–8 – 1–11	Laois
B. Byrne (1–3), M. Storey (1–1), T. Dempsey (1–1), D. Prendergast (1–0), T. Dunne (0–1), J. Holohan (0–1), E. Sinnott (0–1).		N. Delaney (1–1), T. Dunne (0–3), P. Bergin (0–2), D. Rooney (0–1), N. Rigney (0–1).

Dr. Cullen Park, Carlow
Referee: S. O'Meara (Offaly)

==== Semi-finals ====
June 21
Semi-Final

Wexford	3–16 – 3–8	Dublin
J. Holohan (1–5), M. Storey (1–3), B. Byrne (1–1), E. Cleary (0–3), T. Dempsey (0–2), E. Sinnott (0–1), G. O'Connor (0–1).		B. McMahon (1–3), J. Murphy (1–2), S. Kearns (1–0), M. O'Ryan (0–2), S. Dalton (0–1).

Croke Park, Dublin
Attendance: 30,606
Referee: P. Horan (Offaly)

June 21
Semi-Final

Kilkenny	2–15 – 1–12	Offaly
D. J. Carey (1–6), J. Brennan (1–0), L. McCarthy (0–3), M. Phelan (0–2), E. Morrissey (0–2), C. Heffernan (0–1), D. Lawlor (0–1).		Johnny Dooley (0–7), D. Owens (1–0), B. Kelly (0–2), D. Regan (0–2), Joe Dooley (0–1).

Croke Park, Dublin
Attendance: 30,606
Referee: D. Murphy (Wexford)

==== Final ====
July 5
Final

Kilkenny	3–16 – 2–9	Wexford
D. J. Carey (1–6), E. Morrissey (0–6), L. Fennelly (1–1), C. Heffernan (1–1), A. Ronan (0–1), L. McCarthy (0–1).		J. Holohan (1–5), M. Storey (1–0), E. Cleary (0–2), T. Dempsey (0–1), L. O'Gorman (0–1).

Croke Park, Dublin
Attendance: 41,097
Referee: T. Murray (Limerick)

=== Munster Senior Hurling Championship ===
May 24
Quarter-Final

Cork	0–22 – 0–8	Kerry
T. O'Sullivan (0–9), T. Mulcahy (0–4), G. FitzGerald (0–3), K. Hennessy (0–2), B. Corcoran (0–2), C. Casey (0–1), P. Buckley (0–1).		D. Regan (0–5), C. Walsh (0–2), S. Sheehan (0–1).

Páirc Uí Chaoimh, Cork
Referee: J. McDonald (Tipperary)

May 24
Quarter-Final

Waterford	2–13 – 3–10	Clare
C. Delahunty (0–7), S. Aherne (1–1), J. Meaney (1–0), N. Crowley (0–2), P,. Prendergast (0–2), L. O'Connor (0–1).		C. Lyons (2–3), F. Tuohy (1–0), J. O'Connell (0–3), G. O'Loughlin (0–2), M. Daffy (0–1), A. Neville (0–1).

Semple Stadium, Thurles
Referee: T. Murray (Limerick)

May 31
Quarter-Final
Replay

Waterford	0–16 – 0–14	Clare
J. Meaney (0–6), P. Prendergast (0–3), S. Aherne (0–2), S. Daly (0–2), L. O'Connor (0–1), B. Greene (0–1), G. Fitzpatrick (0–1).		C. Lyons (0–9), J. Russell (0–1), A. Neville (0–1), P. J. O'Connell (0–1), M. Daffy (0–1), G. O'Loughlin (0–1).

Semple Stadium, Thurles
Attendance: 8,000
Referee: T. Murray (Limerick)

June 7
Semi-Final

Cork	2–12 – 1–12	Tipperary
T. O'Sullivan (0–7), J. Fitzgibbon (1–1), T. Mulcahy (1–0), B. Corcoran (0–2), G. FitzGerald (0–1), K. Hennessy (0–1).		D. Ryan (1–1), M. Cleary (0–3), C. Stakelum (0–3), P. Fox (0–2), A. Ryan (0–2), D. Carr (0–1).

Páirc Uí Chaoimh, Cork
Attendance: 42,416
Referee: K. Walsh (Clare)

June 14
Semi-Final

Limerick	2–13 – 1–13	Waterford
G. Kirby (1–4), J. O'Connor (1–2), A. Carmody (0–2), G. Hegarty (0–2), M. Houlihan (0–1), S. Fitzgibbon (0–1), A. Garvey (0–1).		J. Meaney (1–5), S. Daly (0–3), P. Prendergast (0–2), B. O'Sullivan (0–2), G. Fitzpatrick (0–1).

Semple Stadium, Thurles
Attendance: 19,228
Referee: W. Barrett (Tipperary)

July 5
Final

Cork	1–22 – 3–11	Limerick
T. O'Sullivan (0–7), B. Egan (0–4), T. Mulcahy (1–0), G. Manley (0–3), C. Casey (0–3), S. McCarthy (0–3), K. Hennessy (0–2).		G. Kirby (1–8), D. Flynn (1–0), M. Reale (1–0), C. Carey (0–1), P. Davoren (0–1), R. Sampson (0–1).

Páirc Uí Chaoimh, Cork
Attendance: 48,036
Referee: W. Barrett (Tipperary)

=== Ulster Senior Hurling Championship ===
July 5
Semi-Final

Down	9–18 – 0–10	Derry
M. Blaney (4–2), N. Sands (3–4), M. Bailie (1–2), G. Blaney (1–1), G. McGrattan (0–2), C. Mageean (0–2), P. Savage (0–2), E. Blaney (0–1), P. Coulter (0–1), D. Hughes (0–1).		R. Stevenson (0–4), O. Collins (0–3), P. Cassidy (0–2), S. O'Neill (0–1).

Casement Park, Belfast
Referee: T. McIntyre (Antrim)

July 12
Final

Antrim	0–11 – 2–16	Down
A. Elliott (0–6), J. Carson (0–3), P. McKillen (0–1), S. P. McKillop (0–1).		M. Baillie (1–3), P. Coulter (1–1), N. Sands (0–4), G. McGrattan (0–4), K. Coulter (0–1), P. Savage (0–1), D. Hughes (0–1), G. Savage (0–1).

Casement Park, Belfast
Attendance: 10,000
Referee: D. Murphy (Wexford)

== Tiered competitions ==
=== All-Ireland Senior B Hurling Championship (Tier 2) ===
==== Bracket ====
Preliminary round
Monaghan	4–06
Meath	1–21
Wicklow	5–07
Kildare	4–09

Quarter-finals
Roscommon	2–13, 1–11
Westmeath	3–10, 3–15
Mayo	4–08
Sligo	1–08
Armagh	0–04
Carlow	3–13
Meath	1–11
Wicklow	2–09

Semi-finals
Westmeath	5–19
Mayo	2–12
Carlow	1–13
Wicklow	0–12

Home final
Westmeath	4–05, 0–17
Carlow	1–14, 3–13
All-Ireland B final
London	3–10
Carlow	2–15

==== Final ====
12 July 1992 Final	London	3–10 — 2–15	Carlow	Emerald GAA Grounds
	P Lynch 1–2, J Murphy 1–2, M McGrath 1–2, D Doyle 0–2, K Morrissey 0–2, S O'Leary 0–1, D McKenna 0–1.		J Hayden 1–3, M Mullins 0–4, B Hayden 1–0, C Jordan 0–3, J Byrne 0–1, P Murphy 0–1, J McDonald 0–1.	Referee: K Walsh (Clare)

== All-Ireland Senior Hurling Championship ==
=== Bracket ===
Quarter-Finals
Carlow	3–09
Galway	4–19

Semi-Finals
Cork	2–17
Down	1–11
Kilkenny	2–13
Galway	1–12

Final
Cork	1–12
Kilkenny	3–10

=== All-Ireland quarter-finals ===
July 26
Quarter-Final

Carlow	3–9 – 4–19	Galway
M. Mullins (0–6), J. McDonald (1–0), P. MUrphy (1–0), C. Jordan (1–0), B. Hayden (0–3).		A. Cunningham (1–4), J. Cooney (1–3), M. Coleman (1–2), E. Burke (1–1), B. Keogh (0–4), J. Campbell (0–2), M. McGrath (0–2), L. Fahy (0–1).

Dr. Cullen Park, Carlow
Attendance: 7,000
Referee: T. Murray (Limerick)

=== All-Ireland semi-finals ===
August 9
Semi-Final

Cork	2–17 – 1–11	Down
K. Hennessy (1–2), T. O'Sullivan (0–5), G. FitzGerald (1–1), T. Mulcahy (0–3), G. Manley (0–2), S. McCarthy (0–2), T. McCarthy (0–1), P. Buckley (0–1).		N. Sands (1–3), G. McGrattan (0–5), K. Coulter (0–1), D. Hughes (0–1).

Croke Park, Dublin
Attendance: 31,066
Referee: D. Murphy (Wexford)

August 9
Semi-Final

Kilkenny	2–13 – 1–12	Galway
D. J. Carey (0–7), L. Fennelly (1–1), L. McCarthy (1–0), E. Morrissey (0–2), C. Heffernan (0–1), J. Brennan (0–1), P. Phelan (0–1).		J. Cooney (0–6), J. Campbell (1–1), L. Burke (0–3), J. Rabbitte (0–1), M. Coleman (0–1).

Croke Park, Dublin
Attendance: 31,066
Referee: W. Barrett (Tipperary)

=== All-Ireland final ===
September 6
Final
15:30 UTC+1

Kilkenny	3–10 – 1–12	Cork
D. J. Carey (1–4), L. McCarthy (1–1), J. Power (1–0), M. Phelan (0–2), L. Fennelly (0–1), C. Heffernan (0–1), A. Ronan (0–1).		G. Manley (1–0), T. O'Sullivan (0–3), S. McCarthy (0–3), T. McCarthy (0–2), K. Hennessy (0–1), T. Mulcahy (0–1), B. Corcoran (0–1), C. Casey (0–1).

Croke Park, Dublin
Attendance: 64,534
Referee: D. Murphy (Wexford)

Kilkenny	Cork

== Top scorers ==
=== Season ===
Rank	Player	County	Tally	Total	Matches	Average
1	D. J. Carey	Kilkenny	3–23	32	4	8.00
2	Tony O'Sullivan	Cork	0–31	31	4	7.75
3	Noel Sands	Down	4–11	23	3	7.66
4	Gary Kirby	Limerick	2–12	18	2	9.00
4	Cyril Lyons	Clare	2–12	18	2	9.00
6	John Holohan	Wexford	2–11	17	3	5.66
7	Michael Blaney	Down	4–2	14	3	4.66
7	Tomás Mulcahy	Cork	2–8	14	5	2.80
9	Joe Cooney	Galway	1–9	12	2	6.00
10	Martin Bailie	Down	2–5	11	3	3.66
10	Liam McCarthy	Kilkenny	2–5	11	4	2.75
10	Kevin Hennessy	Cork	1–8	11	5	2.20
10	Gerard McGrattan	Down	0–11	11	3	3.66

=== Single game ===
Rank	Player	County	Tally	Total	Opposition
1	Michael Blaney	Down	4–2	14	Derry
2	Noel Sands	Down	3–4	13	Derry
3	Gary Kirby	Limerick	1–8	11	Cork
4	D. J. Carey	Kilkenny	1–6	9	Offaly
4	D. J. Carey	Kilkenny	1–6	9	Wexford
4	Tony O'Sullivan	Cork	0–9	9	Kerry
4	Cyril Lyons	Clare	2–3	9	Waterford
4	Cyril Lyons	Clare	0–9	9	Waterford
9	John Holohan	Wexford	1–5	8	Dublin
9	John Holohan	Wexford	1–5	8	Kilkenny
9	Jimmy Meaney	Waterford	1–5	8	Clare
