= Willie Barrett =

Irish hurling referee

Willie Barrett is an Irish former hurling referee. A native of Ardfinnan in County Tipperary, he was one of the sport's top referees and officiated at several All-Ireland finals in minor, under-21 levels, and two senior finals: in 1994 and 2000.

His refereeing career spanned from 1976 until 2018 and he also served as chairman of the national referees development committee.

Achievements
Preceded by Willie Horgan	All-Ireland MHC Final referee 1990	Succeeded by Pat Horan
Preceded by Terence Murray	All-Ireland Under-21 HC Final referee 1992	Succeeded by John McDonnell
Preceded by Terence Murray; Pat O'Connor	All-Ireland SHC Final referee 1994; 2000	Succeeded by Dickie Murphy; Pat O'Connor
