= Willie Horgan =

Irish hurling referee and Gaelic footballer

- Born: 17 May 1944; Dillon's Cross, Cork, Ireland
- Died: 29 May 2015 (aged 71); Wilton, Cork, Ireland
- Resting place: Rathcooney Cemetery
- Occupation: Office clerk
- Known for: Gaelic games referee
- Spouse: Peggy Dorgan
- Children: 4

William Horgan (17 May 1944 – 29 May 2015) was an Irish hurler, Gaelic footballer and referee. At club level he played with Brian Dillons and later served as a referee at club and inter-county levels.

== Career ==
Horgan played hurling and Gaelic football with the Brian Dillons club and was a member of the team that won City JHC titles in 1965 and 1968. He later served as club secretary and was heavily involved in the underage and juvenile section of the club, particularly in running the local street leagues. In retirement from playing, Horgan began his refereeing career in 1974. He began officiating at a number of club games in the Cork SHC before joining the inter-county refereeing scene at minor and under-21 levels. Horgan took charge of his first National League games in 1977 while he also officiated in Railway Cup and All-Ireland SCHC games. Horgan was the referee for the 1991 All-Ireland SHC final between Kilkenny and Tipperary. He retired from inter-county activity in 1995.

== Personal life and death ==
He was married to Peggy Dorgan who won an All-Ireland medal with the Cork senior camogie team in 1970. Horgan died on 29 May 2015, aged 71.

== Honours ==
Brian Dillons

- City Junior A Hurling Championship: 1965, 1968

Achievements
Preceded by John Moore	All-Ireland Senior Hurling Final referee 1991	Succeeded by Dickie Murphy
