= Pat O'Connor (referee) =

Irish hurling referee

- Occupation: Hurling referee

Pat O'Connor is an Irish hurling referee. A native of Limerick he is regarded as one of the sport's top referees and has officiated at several All-Ireland finals in minor, under-21 and senior levels.

Achievements
Preceded by Aodán Mac Suibhne	All-Ireland Minor Hurling Final referee 1995	Succeeded by Joe O'Leary
Preceded by Terence Murray	All-Ireland Under-21 Hurling Final referee 1996	Succeeded by Pat Horan
Preceded by Dickie Murphy; Willie Barrett; Aodán Mac Suibhne	All-Ireland Senior Hurling Final referee 1999; 2001; 2003	Succeeded by Willie Barrett; Aodán Mac Suibhne; Aodán Mac Suibhne
