= Dickie Murphy =

Irish hurler and referee

Personal information
- Native name: Risteard Ó Murchú (Irish)
- Nickname: Dickie
- Born: Enniscorthy, County Wexford

Sport
- Sport: Hurling
- Position: Forward
Club
- Years: Club
- Rapparees
Inter-county
- Years: County
- 1970s-1980s: Wexford
Inter-county titles
- Leinster titles: 0
- All-Irelands: 0

Richard 'Dickie' Murphy (born 1961 in Enniscorthy, County Wexford) is an Irish hurling referee and former player. He played hurling with his local club Rapparees and with the Wexford senior inter-county team in the 1970s and 1980s. Murphy is regarded as one of the best and most popular referees on the inter-county scene. He is married to Jacquie Murphy (née Doyle) and has three sons Cathal, Brian and Ruairi.

== Playing career ==
=== Club ===
Murphy played his club hurling with his local Rapparees club in Enniscorthy. A talented player, he was a substitute on the team which won its only senior county title in 1978. During this time he was heavily involved in the burgeoning Ska and Two-Tone music scenes. As bassist in the band Trojan Undefeated he supported The Specials when they played Dublin's Stardust ballroom in January 1981. Murphy was still a member of the Rapparees team that reached the county senior final in 1993, however, they lost to Cloughbawn on that occasion. He continued to line out for the club at Junior 'B' level until 2000.

=== Inter-county ===
Murphy first came to prominence on the inter-county scene as a member of the Wexford minor hurling team in the late 1970s. He enjoyed little success in this grade as Kilkenny dominated the provincial championship. In 1979 Murphy was also a member of the Wexford under-21 team and he helped the Slaneysiders to victory over arch rivals Kilkenny in the Leinster decider. He later played senior hurling for Wexford, winning Walsh Cup and Oireachtas winners' medals, however, he was unable to establish himself in the championship team.

== Refereeing career ==
Murphy's career as a referee began when he was just twenty-four years-old. In 1985 he took charge of his first major game when he officiated at the Wexford Senior Hurling Championship final between Buffer's Alley and Faythe Harriers. Murphy went on to referee further Wexford county finals in 1987, 1988, 1989 and 1997.

Murphy joined the inter-county panel of referees in 1987, firstly taking charge of National Hurling League Division 2 games before progressing to Division 1 fixtures the following year. His first big game came in early 1988 when he refereed the Division 1 clash of Tipperary and Limerick in Semple Stadium, Thurles.

In 1989 Murphy took charge of his first Leinster senior championship game when Dublin played Laois. He was also the referee for that year's Leinster minor final between Offaly and Kilkenny.

By 1992 Murphy established himself as one of hurling's leading officials. That year's All-Ireland club semi-final between Kiltormer and Cashel King Cormac's was the game that propelled him to the top. He was appointed to referee the subsequent All-Ireland club final between Kiltormer and Birr before later taking charge of the National League final between Limerick and Tipperary. The ultimate honour came his way later that summer when he was appointed to referee the All-Ireland senior hurling final between Cork and Kilkenny. Since then Murphy has officiated at three further All-Ireland finals. In 1995 he was the man in the middle for the historic match Clare and Offaly which saw the Clare men take their first championship title for 81 years. Murphy also refereed the 1997 All-Ireland final between Clare and Tipperary, the first involving two teams from the same province. He was reappointed to take charge of the 1998 final between Kilkenny and Offaly, the first involving two teams from Leinster.

As of 2008 Murphy is still very active as an inter-county referee. As well as taking charge of four All-Ireland finals he has officiated at All-Ireland semi-final and quarter-final stages and at provincial finals in Leinster, Munster and Ulster.

Achievements
Preceded by Willie Horgan; Willie Barrett; Pat Horan; Incumbent	All-Ireland Senior Hurling Final referee 1992; 1995; 1997; 1998	Succeeded by Terence Murray; Pat Horan; Retained; Pat O'Connor
Preceded by Pat Horan; Aodán Mac Suibhne	All-Ireland Under-21 Hurling Final referee 1998; 2002	Succeeded by Ger Harrington; Michael Wadding
