= Terence Murray (referee) =

Irish hurling referee

Terence Murray is an Irish hurling referee. A native of Patrickswell, County Limerick he was one of the sport's top referees throughout the 1980s and 1990s. Murray officiated at several All-Ireland finals in minor, under-21 and senior levels. His son, Brian Murray, is the current goalkeeper of the Patrickswell senior team.

Achievements
Preceded by Pat Horan	All-Ireland Minor Hurling Final referee 1992	Succeeded by Seán McMahon
Preceded by Pat Delaney; Pat Horan	All-Ireland Under-21 Hurling Final referee 1991; 1995	Succeeded by Willie Barrett; Pat O'Connor
Preceded by J.F. Bailey; Dickie Murphy	All-Ireland Senior Hurling Final referee 1987; 1993	Succeeded by Gerry Kirwan; Willie Barrett
