= List of people with given name Liam =

This is a list of people named Liam.

== People with the name "Liam" include ==
=== A ===
- Liam Abernethy (1929–1980), Irish hurler
- Liam Adams (disambiguation), multiple people
- Liam Adcock (born 1996), Australian long jumper
- Liam Agnew (born 1995), English footballer
- Liam Ahern (1916–1974), Irish politician
- Liam Aiken (born 1990), American actor
- Liam Allen, New Zealand rugby union footballer
- Liam Anderson (American football) (born 2000), American football player
- Liam Angel (born 1999), Welsh footballer
- Liam Ansell (born 1993), English field hockey player
- Liam Anthony (born 1987), Australian rules footballer
- Liam Ayad (born 1998), Ivorian footballer
- Liam Aylward (born 1952), Irish politician

=== B ===
- Liam Bailey, English singer-songwriter
- Liam Baker (born 1998), Australian rules footballer
- Liam Ball (1951–1984), Irish swimmer
- Liam Banks (born 1999), English cricketer
- Liam Barry (born 1971), New Zealand rugby union footballer
- Liam Bartlett (born 1961), Australian journalist
- Liam Bates (born 1988), Swiss television personality
- Liam Beckett (born 1951), Northern Irish footballer
- Liam Bekric (born 2001), Australian Paralympic swimmer
- Liam Belcher (born 1996), Welsh rugby union footballer
- Liam Bennett (disambiguation), multiple people
- Liam Benzvi, American singer-songwriter
- Liam Bergin (born 1985), British actor
- Liam Bern (born 2003), South African soccer player
- Liam Bertazzo (born 1992), Italian cyclist
- Liam Blanchfield (born 1996), Irish hurler
- Liam Blyde (born 1997), New Zealand rugby union footballer
- Liam Bond (born 1970), Welsh golfer
- Liam Bonner (born 1981), American singer
- Liam Booth-Smith (born 1987), British political advisor
- Liam Bossin (born 1996), Belgian footballer
- Liam Botham (born 1977), English footballer
- Liam Bowe (born 1997), Australian cricketer
- Liam Bowen, American baseball coach
- Liam Bowron (born 2003), Australian rugby union footballer
- Liam Boyce (born 1991), Northern Irish footballer
- Liam Boyle (disambiguation), multiple people
- Liam Bradley (disambiguation), multiple people
- Liam Brady (born 1956), Irish footballer
- Liam Brannan (born 1982), English footballer
- Liam Brazier (born 2007), English footballer
- Liam Brennan, English physician
- Liam Bretherton (born 1979), Irish rugby league footballer
- Liam Bridcutt (born 1989), English footballer
- Liam Kofi Bright, British philosopher
- Liam Broady (born 1994), British tennis player
- Liam Brown (footballer) (born 1999), Scottish footballer
- Liam Brown (novelist) (born 1983), British novelist
- Liam Browne, Irish racehorse trainer
- Liam Buchanan (born 1985), Scottish footballer
- Liam Buchanan (cricketer) (born 1969), Australian cricketer
- Liam Buckley (born 1960), Irish footballer
- Liam Burke (1928–2005), Irish politician
- Liam Burke (hurler) (born 1972), Irish hurler
- Liam Burns (born 1978), Northern Irish footballer
- Liam Burns (NUS president) (born 1984), English trade unionist
- Liam Burrows (born 1994), Australian musician
- Liam Burt (born 1999), Scottish footballer
- Liam Byrne (disambiguation), multiple people

=== C ===
- Liam Caddis (born 1993), Scottish footballer
- Liam Cahill (born 1977), Irish hurler
- Liam Cahill (journalist) (1950–2022), Irish journalist
- Liam Callanan, American author
- Liam Cameron (born 1990), English boxer
- Liam Campbell (disambiguation), multiple people
- Liam Carey, Irish priest
- Liam Carroll (disambiguation), multiple people
- Liam Caruana (born 1998), American tennis player
- Liam Cary (born 1947), American bishop
- Liam Casey (born 1995), Irish Gaelic footballer
- Liam Chambers, Irish historian
- Liam Charles (born 1997), British baker
- Liam Chilvers (born 1981), English footballer
- Liam Chipperfield (born 2004), Swiss footballer
- Liam Chisholm (born 1991), Canadian rugby union footballer
- Liam Clancy (1935–2009), Irish singer
- Liam Cleere (born 1935), Irish hurler
- Liam Clifford (1876–1949), Irish sports administrator
- Liam Coen (born 1985), American football coach
- Liam Colahan (born 1990), Zimbabwean rower
- Liam Colbon (born 1984), English rugby league footballer
- Liam Coleman (born 1986), English footballer
- Liam Coleman (banker) (born 1966), British banker
- Liam Coll (born 1929), Irish footballer
- Liam Collins (born 2003), Irish hurler
- Liam Coltman (born 1990), New Zealand rugby union footballer
- Liam Connolly (1936–2007), Irish hurler
- Liam Connor (disambiguation), multiple people
- Liam Conroy (born 1992), British boxer
- Liam Coogans (born 1996), Scottish footballer
- Liam Coombes (born 1997), Irish rugby union footballer
- Liam Coombes-Fabling (born 1998), New Zealand rugby union footballer
- Liam Cooper (born 1991), Scottish footballer
- Liam Cooper (rugby league) (born 1996), English rugby league footballer
- Liam Corcoran (born 1984), Canadian singer-songwriter
- Liam Cormier (born 1980), Canadian musician
- Liam Corr (born 1990), Scottish footballer
- Liam Corrigan (born 1997), American rower
- Liam Cort (born 1989), English basketball player
- Liam Cosgrave (1920–2017), Irish politician
- Liam T. Cosgrave (born 1956), Irish politician
- Liam Coyle (disambiguation), multiple people
- Liam Craig (born 1986), Scottish footballer
- Liam Creagh (born 1959), Northern Irish journalist
- Liam Cronin (born 1968), Irish Gaelic footballer
- Liam Cross (born 2003), English footballer
- Liam Cullen (born 1999), Welsh footballer
- Liam Cunningham (disambiguation), multiple people
- Liam Currams (born 1961), Irish hurler

=== D ===
- Liam D'Arcy-Brown (born 1970), British travel writer
- Liam Daish (born 1968), English footballer
- Liam Darville (born 1990), English footballer
- Liam Davie (born 1993), British artistic gymnast
- Liam Davies (disambiguation), multiple people
- Liam Davis (disambiguation), multiple people
- Liam Davison (1957–2014), Australian author
- Liam Dawson (born 1990), English cricketer
- Liam Dawson (footballer) (born 1996), Australian rules footballer
- Liam de Róiste (1882–1959), Irish politician
- Liam De Smet (born 2004), Belgian footballer
- Liam de Young, Australian field hockey player
- Liam Deasy (1896–1074), Irish army officer
- Liam Delap (born 2002), English footballer
- Liam Deois, Irish criminal
- Liam Devally (1933–2018), Irish radio host
- Liam Devaney (1935–2017), Irish hurler
- Liam Diaz, Canadian actor
- Liam Dick (born 1995), Scottish footballer
- Liam Dickinson (born 1999), English footballer
- Liam Dillon (born 1996), English professional boxer
- Liam Dixon (born 1993), English cricketer
- Liam Dobson (born 1994), Canadian football player
- Liam Dolan, English biologist
- Liam Dolman (born 1987), English footballer
- Liam Donald (born 1995), Australian rower
- Liam Donaldson (born 1949), British physician
- Liam Donnelly (disambiguation), multiple people
- Liam Donoghue (born 1974), Irish sportsperson
- Liam Doran (born 1987), British driver
- Liam Dowling (1931–1996), Irish hurler
- Liam Doyle (disambiguation), multiple people
- Liam Draxl (born 2001), Canadian tennis player
- Liam Dudding (born 1994), New Zealand cricketer
- Liam Duggan (born 1996), Australian rules footballer
- Liam Dulson, English footballer
- Liam Dunn (1916–1976), American actor
- Liam Dunne (born 1968), Irish hurler
- Liam Dunne (footballer) (born 1971), Irish footballer
- Liam Durcan, Canadian neurologist

=== E ===
- Liam Edwards (born 1996), English footballer
- Liam Eichenberg (born 1998), American football player
- Liam Engström (born 2004), Swedish ice hockey player
- Liam Evans (disambiguation), multiple people
- Liam Everett (born 1973), American painter
- Liam Everts (born 2004), Belgian motocross racer
- Liam Ezekiel (born 1982), American football player

=== F ===
- Liam Fahy (born 1984), Zimbabwean shoe designer
- Liam Fairhurst (1995–2009), British activist
- Liam Farrell (born 1990), English rugby league footballer
- Liam Feeney (born 1987), English footballer
- Liam Fennelly (born 1958), Irish sportsperson
- Liam Ferguson (born 1940), Irish hurler
- Liam Finn (born 1983), New Zealand musician
- Liam Finn (rugby league) (born 1983), English rugby league footballer
- Liam Firus (born 1992), Canadian figure skater
- Liam Fitzgerald (born 1949), Irish politician
- Liam Fitzpatrick (disambiguation), multiple people
- Liam Flood (1943–2014), Irish bookmaker
- Liam Fontaine (born 1986), English footballer
- Liam Foran (born 1988), New Zealand rugby league footballer
- Liam Fornadel (born 1999), American football player
- Liam Forsyth (born 1996), English rugby league footballer
- Liam Foudy (born 2000), Canadian ice hockey player
- Liam Fox (disambiguation), multiple people
- Liam Fraser (born 1988), Canadian soccer player
- Liam Fray (born 1985), English musician
- Liam Frost, English musician
- Liam Fulton (born 1984), Australian rugby league footballer

=== G ===
- Liam Gaffney (1911–1994), Irish actor
- Liam Gallagher (born 1972), English singer-songwriter
- Liam Garrigan (born 1981), English actor
- Liam Garvo, English film producer
- Liam Genockey (born 1948), Irish musician
- Liam George (born 1979), English footballer
- Liam Georgetown (born 1985), Australian rugby league footballer
- Liam Gerrard, British-Irish actor
- Liam Gibbs (born 2002), English footballer
- Liam Gibson (born 1997), English footballer
- Liam Gill (disambiguation), multiple people
- Liam Gillick (born 1964), English artist
- Liam Gilmartin (1921–2019), Irish Gaelic footballer
- Liam Given (born 2010), American musician
- Liam Gordon (disambiguation), multiple people
- Liam Gormley (born 1993), Scottish footballer
- Liam Graham (disambiguation), multiple people
- Liam Grainger (1913–1985), Irish Gaelic footballer
- Liam Green (born 1988), English footballer
- Liam Greentree (born 2006), Canadian ice hockey player
- Liam Griffin (disambiguation), multiple people
- Liam Grimshaw (born 1995), English footballer
- Liam Grimwood, English archer
- Liam Guthrie (born 1997), Australian cricketer

=== H ===
- Liam Hackett (born 1991), British activist
- Liam Hallam-Eames (born 1995), New Zealand rugby union footballer
- Liam Halligan (born 1969), English economist
- Liam Hamilton (1928–2000), Irish judge
- Liam P. Hardy (born 1973), American judge
- Liam Harnan, Irish Gaelic footballer
- Liam Harris (born 1997), English rugby league footballer
- Liam Harrison (disambiguation), multiple people
- Liam Hartnett (born 1963), Irish Gaelic footballer
- Liam Harvey (born 2005), Scottish footballer
- Liam Haskett (born 2001), Australian cricketer
- Liam Hassett (born 1975), Irish Gaelic footballer
- Liam Hatch (born 1982), English footballer
- Liam Hatcher (born 1996), Australian cricketer
- Liam Hayes (disambiguation), multiple people
- Liam Hearn (born 1985), English footballer
- Liam Heath (born 1984), British canoeist
- Liam Heffernan, Irish actor
- Liam Hemsworth (born 1990), Australian actor
- Liam Henderson (born 1996), Scottish footballer
- Liam Henderson (English footballer) (born 1989), English footballer
- Liam Hendricks (born 1994), South African rugby union footballer
- Liam Hendriks (born 1989), Australian baseball player
- Liam Hennessy (disambiguation), multiple people
- Liam Henry (born 2001), Australian rules footballer
- Liam Henry (rugby league) (born 2001), Australian rugby league footballer
- Liam Hickey (born 1998), Canadian hockey player
- Liam Hicks (born 1999), American baseball player
- Liam Higgins (disambiguation), multiple people
- Liam Highfield (born 1990), English snooker player
- Liam Hill (born 1993), Australian cyclist
- Liam Hinphey (born 1984), Northern Irish Gaelic footballer
- Liam Hodgins, Irish hurler
- Liam Hogan (born 1989), English footballer
- Liam Hogan (hurler) (1939–2014), Irish hurler
- Liam Holden (1953–2022), Northern Irish criminal
- Liam Holohan (born 1988), British cyclist
- Liam Holowesko (born 2000), American cyclist
- Liam Honohan (born 1969), Irish Gaelic footballer
- Liam Hood (born 1992), Scottish rugby league footballer
- Liam Horne (born 1998), Papua New Guinean rugby league footballer
- Liam Horner (1943–2003), Irish cyclist
- Liam Horrigan, Irish rugby league footballer
- Liam Horsted (born 1985), English footballer
- Liam Hourican, Irish actor
- Liam Howe (born 1974), English record producer
- Liam Howlett (born 1971), English record producer
- Liam Hudson (1933–2005), British psychologist
- Liam Hughes (disambiguation), multiple people
- Liam Humbles (born 2003), English footballer
- Liam Hurst (born 1994), English footballer
- Liam Hurt (born 1994), English cricketer
- Liam Hutchinson (born 1991), Welsh footballer
- Liam Hutt, English footballer
- Liam Hyland (born 1933), Irish politician

=== I ===
- Liam Inglis (1709–1778), Irish poet
- Liam Ingram (born c.1985), former international badminton player from Wales
- Liam Irwin, Irish Gaelic footballer
- Liam Isherwood (born 2002), English footballer
- Liam Ison (born 2004), Australian rugby league player

=== J ===
- Liam James (born 1996), Canadian actor
- Liam Jacobs (born 2001), South African politician
- Liam Jegou (born 1996), Irish slalom canoeist
- Liam Jessop (born 2005), Gibraltarian footballer
- Liam Jewell (born 1968), Canadian canoeist
- Liam Johnson (born 1997), English rugby league footballer
- Liam Johnson (rugby league, born 1977) (born 1977), Australian rugby league footballer
- Liam Johnston (born 1993), Scottish golfer
- Liam Jones (born 1991), Australian rules footballer
- Liam Jordan (born 1998), South African footballer
- Liam Jurrah (born 1988), Australian rules footballer

=== K ===
- Liam Kapeikis (born 2004), American figure skater
- Liam Kavanagh (1935–2021), Irish politician
- Liam Kay (born 1991), Irish rugby league footballer
- Liam Kearney (born 1983), Irish footballer
- Liam Kearns (1962–2023), Irish Gaelic footballer
- Liam Kelley (born 1966), American historian
- Liam Kelly (disambiguation), multiple people
- Liam Kennedy (disambiguation), multiple people
- Liam Kenny (born 1977), Australian-Irish squash player
- Liam Kent (born 1991), English rugby league footballer
- Liam Keogh (born 1981), Scottish footballer
- Liam Keoghan (born 1967), Irish hurler
- Liam Kerr (born 1975), Scottish politician
- Liam Kerrigan (born 2000), Irish footballer
- Liam Killeen (born 1982), British mountain biker
- Liam King (disambiguation), multiple people
- Liam Kinsella (born 1996), English footballer
- Liam Kirk (born 1997), English rugby league footballer
- Liam Kirk (ice hockey) (born 2000), British ice hockey player
- Liam Kitching (born 1999), English footballer
- Liam Knight (born 1995), Australian rugby league footballer
- Liam Krall (born 2002), American tennis player

=== L ===
- Liam Langridge-Barker (born 1999), British basketball player
- Liam Langton (born 1997), Irish hurler
- Liam Lawlor (1944–2005), Irish politician
- Liam Lawlor (hurler) (born 1985), Irish footballer and hurler
- Liam Lawrence (born 1981), English-Irish footballer
- Liam Lawson (born 2002), New Zealand racing driver
- Liam Lawton, Irish singer-songwriter
- Liam Lebherz (born 2007), Awesome guy
- Liam Lewis (born 1986), English cricketer
- Liam Lindsay (born 1995), Scottish footballer
- Liam Lindström (born 1985), Canadian-Swedish ice hockey player
- Liam Lis (born 2001), American singer-songwriter
- Liam Livingstone (born 1993), English cricketer
- Liam Loughlan (born 2002), English footballer
- Liam Lynch (disambiguation), multiple people

=== M ===
- Liam Mac Cóil (born 1952), Irish writer
- Liam Rua Mac Coitir (??–1738), Irish poet
- Liam Mac Con Iomaire (1937–2019), Irish journalist
- Liam Mac Curtain an Dúna (1668–1724), Irish poet
- Liam MacCarthy (1853–1928), Irish businessman
- Liam MacDaid (1945–2023), Irish prelate
- Liam MacDevitt (born 1994), English television presenter
- Liam Macdonald (born 1989), Australian actor
- Liam MacGabhann (1908–1979), Irish journalist
- Liam MacIntyre (born 1983), Scottish shinty player
- Liam Madden (born 1983/1984), American veteran and politician
- Liam Mahoney (born 1987), Canadian football player
- Liam Malone (born 1993), New Zealand Paralympic runner
- Liam Mandeville (born 1997), English footballer
- Liam Manning (born 1985), English footballer
- Liam Marsden (born 1994), English footballer
- Liam Marshall (born 1996), English rugby league footballer
- Liam Martin (born 1997), Australian rugby league footballer
- Liam Massaubi, Canadian entrepreneur
- Liam Maxwell (born 1968), British public servant
- Liam McAlinden (born 1993), Irish footballer
- Liam McArthur (born 1967), Scottish politician
- Liam McBean (born 1994), Australian rules footballer
- Liam McCabe (born 1999), Ecuadorian footballer
- Liam McCarron (born 2001), English footballer
- Liam McCarthy (disambiguation), multiple people
- Liam McCormick (1916–1996), Irish architect
- Liam McCullough (born 1997), American football player
- Liam McFarlane (born 1985), Canadian speed skater
- Liam McGeary (born 1982), English mixed martial artist
- Liam McGing (born 1998), Australian soccer player
- Liam Óg McGovern (born 1991), Irish hurler
- Liam McGrath (disambiguation), multiple people
- Liam McHale (born 1965), Irish Gaelic football coach
- Liam McHugh (born 1977), American television presenter
- Liam McIlvanney, Scottish writer
- Liam McIntyre (born 1982), Australian actor
- Liam McKechnie (born 1951), Irish judge
- Liam McLaughlin (born 1968), American politician
- Liam McLinskey (born 2001), American ice hockey player
- Liam McMahon (born 1976), Irish actor
- Liam McMillan (born 1990), British racing driver
- Liam McMorrow (born 1987), Canadian basketball player
- Liam McNamara (born 1997), Australian rugby union footballer
- Liam McNeeley (born 2005), American basketball player
- Liam McStravick (born 2004), Northern Irish footballer
- Liam Meaney (born 1972), Irish hurler
- Liam Mellows (1892–1922), Irish politician
- Liam Messam (born 1984), New Zealand rugby union footballer
- Liam Middleton (born 1977), Zimbabwean rugby union coach
- Liam Millar (born 1999), Canadian soccer player
- Liam Miller (1981–2018), Irish footballer
- Liam Mitchell (disambiguation), multiple people
- Liam Moffatt (born 1997), Canadian snowboarder
- Liam Möller (born 2004), Finnish footballer
- Liam Mooney (born 1972), English rugby union footballer
- Liam Moore (born 1993), Jamaican footballer
- Liam Morrison (born 2003), Scottish footballer
- Liam Mower (born 1992), English actor
- Liam Mulvihill (born 1946), Irish Gaelic footballer
- Liam Munroe (1933–2024), Irish footballer
- Liam Murphy (disambiguation), multiple people
- Liam Murray (born 1997), Canadian rugby union footballer

=== N ===
- Liam Nash (born 1996), English footballer
- Liam Naughten (1944–1996), Irish politician
- Liam Neale (born 1989), English rugby union footballer
- Liam Needham (born 1985), English footballer
- Liam Neeson (born 1952), Northern Irish actor
- Liam Neill (born 1997), South African water polo player
- Liam Nevin (born 1951), Irish writer
- Liam Dower Nilsson (born 2003), Swedish ice hockey player
- Liam Nimmo (born 1984), English footballer
- Liam Noble (disambiguation), multiple people
- Liam Nolan (disambiguation), multiple people
- Liam Norberg (born 1969), Swedish actor
- Liam Norwell (born 1991), English cricketer

=== O ===
- Liam Ó Briain (1888–1974), Irish political activist
- Liam O'Brien (disambiguation), multiple people
- Liam Ó Buachalla (1899–1970), Irish politician
- Liam Ó Buachalla (historian) (??–1966), Irish historian
- Liam O'Connor (disambiguation), multiple people
- Liam Ó Cuinneagáin, Irish linguist
- Liam O'Donoghue (born 1952), Irish hurler
- Liam O'Donovan (disambiguation), multiple people
- Liam O'Driscoll (born 1987), English cricketer
- Liam Ó Dúgáin, Irish scribe
- Liam O'Flaherty (1896–1984), Irish novelist
- Liam O'Flaherty (footballer), Irish footballer
- Liam O'Flynn (1945–2018), Irish musician
- Liam O'Gallagher (1917–2007), American painter
- Liam O'Grady (born 1950), American judge
- Liam Ó hAnluain (1910–1992), Irish educator
- Liam Óg Ó hÉineacháin, Irish Gaelic footballer
- Liam Öhgren (born 2004), Swedish ice hockey player
- Liam Ó hOisín (1825–1871), Irish translator
- Liam O'Kane (born 1948), Northern Irish footballer
- Liam Ó Maonlaí (born 1964), Irish musician
- Liam Ó Muirthile (1950–2018), Irish poet
- Liam Ó Murchú (1929–2015), Irish television presenter
- Liam O'Neill (disambiguation), multiple people
- Liam Ó Rinn (1886–1943), Irish civil servant
- Liam Ó Seachnasaigh (??–1579), Irish statesman
- Liam O'Sullivan (1981–2002), Scottish footballer
- Liam Ó Tuama (1931–2019), Irish hurler

=== P ===
- Liam Paisley (born 1997), English rugby league footballer
- Liam Palmer (born 1991), English footballer
- Liam Paninski (born 1978), American neuroscientist
- Liam Paro (born 1996), Australian boxer
- Liam Parsons (born 1977), Canadian rower
- Liam Patrick (born 1988), Australian rules footballer
- Liam Patterson-White (born 1998), English cricketer
- Liam Payne (1993–2024), English singer
- Liam Peters (born 1997), South African cricketer
- Liam Phillips (born 1989), British cyclist
- Liam Picken (born 1986), Australian rules footballer
- Liam Pickering (born 1968), Australian rules footballer
- Liam Pilkington (1894–1977), Irish revolutionary
- Liam Pitchford (born 1993), British table tennis player
- Liam Plunkett (born 1985), English cricketer
- Liam Polwart (born 1995), New Zealand rugby union footballer
- Liam Polworth (born 1994), Scottish footballer
- Liam Power (1934–1998), Irish Gaelic footballer
- Liam Price (1891–1967), Irish judge
- Liam Pullen (born 2005), English snooker player
- Liam Putnam (born 2008), American chess grandmaster

=== Q ===
- Liam Quaide (born 1979), Irish politician
- Liam Quinn (born 1949), American-Irish revolutionary

=== R ===
- Liam Raul (??–1945), Irish politician
- Liam Ravenhill (born 2002), English footballer
- Liam Reale (born 1983), Irish runner
- Liam Rector (1949–2007), American poet
- Liam Reddox (born 1986), Canadian ice hockey player
- Liam Reddy (born 1981), Australian footballer
- Liam Redmond (1913–1989), Irish actor
- Liam Redmond (rowing) (born 1953), Irish rower
- Liam Reidy (hurler) (1924–2007), Irish hurler
- Liam Reilly (1955–2021), Irish singer
- Liam Renton (born 1976), Australian radio presenter
- Liam Ridehalgh (born 1991), English footballer
- Liam Ridgewell (born 1984), English footballer
- Liam Robbins (born 1999), American basketball player
- Liam Roberts (born 1994), English footballer
- Liam Robinson (disambiguation), multiple people
- Liam Roche (born 1999), Zimbabwean cricketer
- Liam Rose (born 1997), Australian soccer player
- Liam Rosenior (born 1984), English footballer
- Liam Rowe, Australian rules football umpire
- Liam Rush (born 1982), Australian basketball player
- Liam Rushe (born 1990), Irish hurler
- Liam Ryan (disambiguation), multiple people

=== S ===
- Liam Salter (born 1993), English rugby league footballer
- Liam Sammon (born 1946), Irish Gaelic footballer
- Liam Sanders, New Zealand Paralympic boccia player
- Liam Sanford (born 1996), English field hockey player
- Liam Santamaria, Australian basketball player
- Liam Scales (born 1998), Irish footballer
- Liam Scarlett (1986–2021), British choreographer
- Liam Sceats (born 2005), New Zealand racing driver
- Liam Schluter (born 1999), Australian Paralympic swimmer
- Liam Scott (born 2000), Australian cricketer
- Liam Scullion (born 2001), Scottish footballer
- Liam Sebastien (born 1985), West Indian cricketer
- Liam Sercombe (born 1990), English footballer
- Liam Sharp (born 1968), British comic book artist
- Liam Shaw (born 2001), English footballer
- Liam Sheedy (born 1969), Irish hurler
- Liam Shephard (born 1994), Welsh footballer
- Liam Shiels (born 1991), Australian rules footballer
- Liam Shotton (born 1987), English footballer
- Liam Silke (born 1994), Irish Gaelic footballer
- Liam Simmons (born 1983), Australian basketball coach
- Liam Simpson (born 1966), Irish hurler
- Liam Skelly (born 1941), Irish businessman
- Liam Slade (born 1995), English footballer
- Liam Slater (born 1993), British professional wrestler
- Liam Slock (born 2000), Belgian cyclist
- Liam Smith (disambiguation), multiple people
- Liam Smyth (born 2001), English footballer
- Liam Sole (born 1999), English footballer
- Liam Spence (born 1998), Australian baseball player
- Liam Spencer (born 1964), British artist
- Liam Squire (born 1991), New Zealand rugby union footballer
- Liam Stanley (born 1997), Canadian athlete
- Liam Stapleton (born 1996), Australian radio presenter
- Liam Steel (born 1991), New Zealand rugby union footballer
- Liam Sternberg (born 1949), American songwriter
- Liam Stevenson, Scottish activist
- Liam Stocker (born 2000), Australian rules footballer
- Liam Sue-Tin (born 1992), Greek footballer
- Liam Sullivan (1923–1998), American actor
- Liam Kyle Sullivan (born 1973), American comedian
- Liam Sumner (born 1993), Australian rules footballer
- Liam Sutcliffe (born 1994), English rugby league footballer

=== T ===
- Liam Talbot (born 1981), Australian racing driver
- Liam Tallon (born 1976), Australian rugby league footballer
- Liam Tancock (born 1985), English swimmer
- Liam Teague (born 1974), Trinidadian composer
- Liam Thomas (born 1994), Australian basketball player
- Liam Thompson (disambiguation), multiple people
- Liam Tindall (born 2001), English rugby league footballer
- Liam Titcomb (born 1987), Canadian musician
- Liam Tobin (1895–1963), Irish army general
- Liam Toland (born 1972), Irish rugby union footballer
- Liam Tomsett (born 1992), English footballer
- Liam Tourki (born 1999), French snowboarder
- Liam Treadwell (1986–2020), English jockey
- Liam Trevaskis (born 1999), English cricketer
- Liam Trotter (born 1988), English footballer
- Liam Tuohy (disambiguation), multiple people
- Liam Turner (born 1999), Irish rugby union footballer
- Liam Twomey (born 1967), Irish politician
- Liam Twomey (triathlete) (born 1994), Australian Paralympic triathlete
- Liam Tyson (born 1969), English guitarist

=== U ===
- Liam Underwood (born 1991), Canadian rugby union footballer

=== V ===
- Liam van Gelderen (born 2001), Dutch footballer
- Liam Voice (born 1998), Ugandian musician
- Liam Vrolijk (born 2002), Dutch chess grandmaster

=== W ===
- Liam Wakefield (born 1994), English footballer
- Liam Waldock (born 2000), English footballer
- Liam Walker (born 1988), Gibraltarian footballer
- Liam Walsh (disambiguation), multiple people
- Liam Ward (1930–2022), Irish jockey
- Liam Watkinson (born 1991), English cricketer
- Liam Watson (disambiguation), multiple people
- Liam Watt (born 1994), Scottish footballer
- Liam Watts (born 1990), English rugby league footballer
- Liam Weldon (1933–1995), Irish singer-songwriter
- Liam Whyte (1907–1998), Irish politician
- Liam Williams (disambiguation), multiple people
- Liam Willis (born 1993), English footballer
- Liam Wilson (born 1979), American musician
- Liam Wong, Scottish photographer
- Liam Wood (born 1998), New Zealand footballer
- Liam Wooding (born 1993), Australian footballer
- Liam Wright (born 1997), Australian rugby player

=== Y ===
- Liam Youlley (born 1997), Australian soccer player
- Liam Young (born 1979), Australian director

=== Z ===
- Liam Zamel-Paez (born 1988), Australian high jumper
- Liam Zammit (born 1981), Australian cricketer

== Fictional characters ==
- Liam Butcher, a character in the English soap opera EastEnders
- Liam Devlin, a character in the novels of Jack Higgins
- Liam Donovan, a character from Hollyoaks.
- Liam Hunnicutt, a character in the American animated television series The Loud House
- Liam Berish, a character from Degrassi: The Next Generation.
- Liam Ridley, a character in the American television series Dynasty
- Liam Spencer The Bold and the Beautiful, a character in the American soap opera The Bold and the Beautiful.

== See also ==
- List of people with given name William
