= Bemidji State Beavers men's ice hockey statistical leaders =

The Bemidji State Beavers men's ice hockey statistical leaders are individual statistical leaders of the Bemidji State Beavers men's ice hockey program in various categories, including goals, assists, points, and saves. Within those areas, the lists identify single-game, single-season, and career leaders. The Beavers represent Bemidji State University in the NCAA's Central Collegiate Hockey Association.

Bemidji State began competing in intercollegiate ice hockey in 1947. These lists are updated through the end of the 2020–21 season.

== Goals ==
Career
Rk	Player	Goals	Seasons
1	Mark Eagles	100	1972–73 1973–74 1974–75 1975–76
	Rod Heisler	100	1975–76 1976–77 1977–78 1978–79
3	Mike Alexander	98	1982–83 1983–84 1984–85 1985–86
4	Scott Johnson	96	1987–88 1988–89 1989–90 1990–91
5	Dale Baldwin	93	1976–77 1977–78 1978–79 1979–80
6	Joel Otto	89	1980–81 1981–82 1982–83 1983–84
7	Dan Richards	87	1985–86 1986–87 1987–88 1988–89
8	Wendal Jellison	86	1981–82 1982–83 1983–84 1984–85
	Jamie Erb	86	1989–90 1990–91 1991–92 1992–93
10	Jim Tyler	83	1985–86 1986–87 1987–88 1988–89

Season
Rk	Player	Goals	Season
1	Dale Baldwin	43	1979–80
2	Glen Beckett	41	1969–70
3	Dan Richards	37	1987–88
	Jim Tyler	37	1987–88
5	Mark Kristo	35	1975–76
	Scott Monsrud	35	1983–84
	Tim Lescarbeau	35	1985–86
8	Mark Eagles	34	1973–74
9	Joel Otto	33	1982–83
10	Mike Alexander	32	1985–86
	Denny Lemieux	32	1970–71
	Mark Eagles	32	1972–73
	Joel Otto	32	1983–84

Single Game
Rk	Player	Goals	Season	Opponent
1	Glen Beckett	6	1969–70	Wis. St.-Superior
	Denny Lemieux	6	1970–71	Wis. St-Superior
3	Jim Thompson	5	1964–65	Moorhead State
	Dale Baldwin	5	1979–80	Wis. St-Superior
	Mike Alexander	5	1985–86	Eau Claire
	Dan Richards	5	1987–88	St. Scholastica
	Jamie Erb	5	1991–92	St. Scholastica

== Assists ==
Career
Rk	Player	Assists	Seasons
1	Mike Alexander	154	1982–83 1983–84 1984–85 1985–86
2	Mark Eagles	125	1972–73 1973–74 1974–75 1975–76
3	Joel Otto	115	1980–81 1981–82 1982–83 1983–84
4	Bryan Grand	112	1967–68 1968–69 1969–70
5	Brian Carleton	111	1976–77 1977–78 1978–79 1979–80
6	Wendal Jellison	99	1981–82 1982–83 1983–84 1984–85
	Todd Lescarbeau	99	1983–84 1984–85 1985–86 1986–87
8	John Murphy	98	1975–76 1976–77 1977–78 1978–79
9	Scott Johnson	95	1987–88 1988–89 1989–90 1990–91
10	Jamie Erb	94	1989–90 1990–91 1991–92 1992–93
	Ian Resch	94	1984–85 1985–86 1986–87 1987–88

Season
Rk	Player	Assists	Season
1	Mike Alexander	58	1985–86
2	Ian Resch	54	1987–88
3	Bryan Grand	53	1968–69
4	Mark Eagles	44	1975–76
5	Joel Otto	43	1983–84
6	Brian Carleton	41	1977–78
	Todd Lescarbeau	41	1986–87
8	Bryan Grand	40	1969–70
	Drey Bradley	40	1983–84
	Todd Lescarbeau	40	1985–86
	Jude Boulianne Jr	40	1994–95

Single Game
Rk	Player	Assists	Season	Opponent
1	Bryan Grand	7	1969–70	

== Points ==
Career
Rk	Player	Points	Seasons
1	Mike Alexander	252	1982–83 1983–84 1984–85 1985–86
2	Mark Eagles	225	1972–73 1973–74 1974–75 1975–76
3	Joel Otto	204	1980–81 1981–82 1982–83 1983–84
4	Scott Johnson	191	1987–88 1988–89 1989–90 1990–91
5	Rod Heisler	190	1975–76 1976–77 1977–78 1978–79
6	Wendal Jellison	185	1981–82 1982–83 1983–84 1984–85
7	Dan Richards	180	1985–86 1986–87 1987–88 1988–89
	Jamie Erb	180	1989–90 1990–91 1991–92 1992–93
9	John Murphy	169	1975–76 1976–77 1977–78 1978–79
10	Scott Currie	165	1975–76 1976–77 1977–78 1978–79

Season
Rk	Player	Points	Season
1	Mike Alexander	90	1985–86
2	Joel Otto	75	1983–84
3	Dale Baldwin	71	1979–80
4	Mark Eagles	70	1973–74
5	Todd Lescarbeau	70	1985–86

Single Game
Rk	Player	Points	Season	Opponent
1	Paul Lafond	8	1959–60	Northland (Wis.)

== Saves ==
Career
Rk	Player	Saves	Seasons
1	Michael Bitzer	3,165	2014–15 2015–16 2016–17 2017–18
2	Steve O'Shea	3,065	1985–86 1986–87 1987–88 1988–89
3	Mattias Sholl	2,775	2021–22 2022–23 2023–24 2024–25
4	Grady Hunt	2,717	2000–01 2001–02 2002–03 2003–04
5	Chuck Scanlon	2,657	1971–72 1972–73 1973–74 1974–75
6	Dan Bakala	2,379	2008–09 2009–10 2010–11 2011–12
7	Adam Pavlatos	2,214	1996–97 1997–98 1998–99 1999–00
8	Jim Scanlan	2,211	1978–79 1979–80 1980–81 1981–82
9	Matt Climie	2,201	2004–05 2005–06 2006–07 2007–08
10	Zach Driscoll	2,157	2018–19 2019–20 2020–21

Season
Rk	Player	Saves	Season
1	Steve O'Shea	1,066	1986–87
2	Michael Bitzer	912	2016–17
3	Steve O'Shea	891	1988–89
4	Mattias Sholl	890	2024–25
5	Steve O'Shea	879	1987–88
6	Dan Bakala	875	2010–11
7	Michael Bitzer	819	2017–18
8	Zach Driscoll	808	2019–20

Single Game
Rk	Player	Saves	Season	Opponent
1	Mattias Sholl	57	2023–24	Wisconsin
2	Steve O'Shea	54	1988–89	
