= Lee Smith =

Lee Smith is the name of:

== Arts, entertainment and media ==
- Lee Smith (fiction author) (born 1944), American author of fiction
- Lee Smith (film editor) (born 1960), Australian film editor
- Lee Smith (musician) (born 1983), American drummer
- Lee Smith (journalist) (born 1962), American journalist, editor and author
- Lee Smith, a fictional American photojournalist in the 2024 film Civil War

== Sports ==
- Lee Smith (American football) (born 1987), American football player
- Lee Smith (baseball) (born 1957), American baseball pitcher
- Lee Smith (rugby) (born 1986), English rugby league player
- A. Lee Smith (1915–1985), American football coach and college athletics administrator

== See also ==
- Leigh Smith (disambiguation)
- Leon Smith (disambiguation)
- Liam Smith (disambiguation)
