= Liam Campbell (disambiguation) =

Liam Campbell is an alleged volunteer in the Real Irish Republican Army.

Liam Campbell may also refer to:

- Liam Campbell (rugby league), English rugby league footballer
- Liam Campbell (photographer), photographer and magazine editor

== See also ==
- List of people with given name Liam
