= Liam Lynch =

Liam Lynch may refer to:

- Liam Lynch (Irish republican) (1893–1923), general in the Irish Republican Army
- Liam Lynch (writer) (1937–1989), Irish playwright and novelist
- Liam Lynch (musician) (born 1970), American musician, writer, and movie director

== See also ==
- List of people with given name Liam
