= Liam O'Connor =

Liam O'Connor may refer to:

- Liam O'Connor (architect) (born 1961), British architect
- Liam O'Connor (cricketer) (born 1993), Australian cricketer
- Liam O'Connor (Danish rapper), rapper, known as L.O.C.
- Liam O'Connor (fiddler) (born 1984), Irish fiddle player
- Liam O'Connor (Gaelic footballer) (1955–2013), Irish Gaelic footballer
- Liam O'Connor (Irish musician), multi-instrumentalist and accordion player
- Liam O'Connor (rugby union) (born 1995), Irish rugby union player

== See also ==
- Liam Connor (disambiguation)
- List of people with given name Liam
