= Amon Buchanan =

Australian rules footballer, born 1982

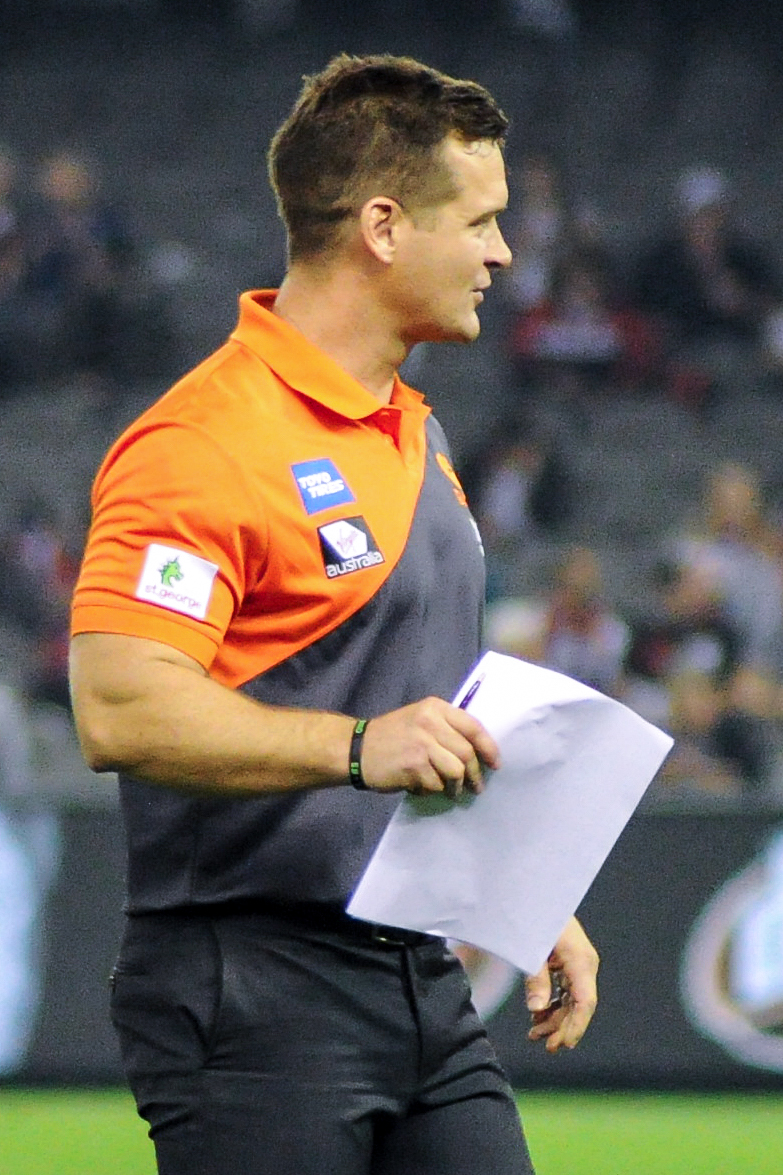
- Buchanan in April 2018

Personal information
- Full name: Amon Buchanan
- Born: 10 October 1982 (age 44)
- Original team: Geelong Falcons (TAC Cup)
- Draft: No. 52, 2000 Rookie Draft, Sydney; No. 45, 2003 National Draft, Sydney
- Height: 179 cm (5 ft 10 in)
- Weight: 83 kg (183 lb)
- Position: Midfielder

Playing career^{1}
Years	Club	Games (Goals)
2002–2009	Sydney	116 (57)
2010–2012	Brisbane Lions	18 (9)
Total		134 (66)

International team honours
Years	Team	Games (Goals)
2005	Australia	2
- ^{1} Playing statistics correct to the end of 2012.

Career highlights
- AFL premiership player: 2005; NEAFL premiership player: 2012

Amon Buchanan (born 10 October 1982) is a former Australian rules football who played for the Brisbane Lions and the Sydney Swans in the AFL. He is currently serving as a development coach of the Sydney Swans.

== AFL career ==
=== Sydney ===
Buchanan grew up in the Victorian town of Colac, west of Melbourne. He played football for Colac and the Geelong Falcons Under 18's team, winning a premiership with the Falcons in 2000 and subsequently being selected by the Sydney Swans in the post-season National Draft. He made his senior debut in Round 11 of the 2002 season against West Coast. By the end of 2002, he had played six matches, but had a disappointing season the next year, suffering knee and ankle injuries, not playing a single senior game and being delisted. However, he was redrafted by the Swans, and had established himself as a regular member of the team by the second half of 2004. During Sydney's 2005 premiership-winning season, Buchanan played in every match, making useful contributions in the midfield and kicking the go-ahead goal with 15 minutes remaining in Sydney's four point grand final win against West Coast.

In 2007, Buchanan became the first Swan to be suspended since early 2005. He was also suspended for four matches in Round 15, 2008 for reckless conduct against Hawthorn's Luke Hodge.

=== Brisbane Lions ===
At the end of the 2009 season, Buchanan was traded to the Brisbane Lions as part of a three-way deal with West Coast and Sydney. He was given the number 33 guernsey, vacated by Rhan Hooper and made famous by Darryl White. He made his debut for the Lions in their Round 1, 2010 clash against West Coast at the Gabba. He retired from AFL football at the end of the 2012 season.

== Post-playing career ==
In 2023 Buchanan rejoined the Sydney Swans as a development coach.

== Personal life ==
Sporting blood runs in Amon's family with brothers Liam Buchanan, a state cricketer for the Victorian Bushrangers, and Meyrick Buchanan, representing Melbourne Renegades in the 2011–12 Big Bash League.

== Statistics ==
Legend
G	Goals	K	Kicks	D	Disposals	T	Tackles
B	Behinds	H	Handballs	M	Marks

Season	Team	No.	Games	Totals							Averages (per game)						
Season	Team	No.	Games	G	B	K	H	D	M	T	G	B	K	H	D	M	T
2002	Sydney	32	6	1	2	15	20	35	11	3	0.2	0.3	2.5	3.3	5.8	1.8	0.5
2003	Sydney	32	0	—	—	—	—	—	—	—	—	—	—	—	—	—	—
2004	Sydney	32	16	6	6	78	98	176	29	49	0.4	0.4	4.9	6.1	11.0	1.8	3.1
2005	Sydney	32	26	14	18	231	199	430	83	80	0.5	0.7	8.9	7.7	16.5	3.2	3.1
2006	Sydney	32	24	13	8	249	183	432	104	96	0.5	0.3	10.4	7.6	18.0	4.3	4.0
2007	Sydney	32	16	6	8	149	146	295	81	45	0.4	0.5	9.3	9.1	18.4	5.1	2.8
2008	Sydney	32	20	14	11	156	181	337	98	64	0.8	0.6	7.8	9.1	16.9	4.9	3.2
2009	Sydney	32	8	2	3	45	90	135	27	37	0.3	0.4	5.6	11.3	16.9	3.4	4.6
2010	Brisbane Lions	33	12	9	3	67	89	156	48	37	0.8	0.3	5.6	7.4	13.0	4.0	3.1
2011	Brisbane Lions	33	5	0	1	26	48	74	15	18	0.0	0.2	5.2	9.6	14.8	3.0	3.6
2012	Brisbane Lions	33	1	0	1	7	12	19	2	2	0.0	1.0	7.0	12.0	19.0	2.0	2.0
Career			134	66	61	1023	1066	2089	498	431	0.5	0.5	7.6	8.0	15.6	3.7	3.2
