= Liam Connor (disambiguation) =

Liam Connor was a character in Coronation Street.

Liam Connor may also refer to:

- Liam Connor Jr., Coronation Street character
- Liam Connor (Gaelic footballer)

== See also ==
- Liam O'Connor (disambiguation)
- List of people with given name Liam
