= Liam Williams =

Liam Williams may refer to:

- Liam Williams (comedian) (born 1988), English comedian
- Liam Williams (rugby union) (born 1991), Welsh rugby union player
- Liam Williams (boxer) (born 1992), Welsh boxer
- Liam Williams (rowing) (born 1960), Irish Olympic rower

== See also ==
- List of people with given name Liam
