= Andrea Guatelli =

Italian footballer (born 1984)

Personal information
- Date of birth: 5 May 1984 (age 42)
- Place of birth: Parma, Italy
- Height: 1.97 m (6 ft 5 1/2 in)
- Position: Goalkeeper

Youth career
- –2005: Parma

Senior career*
| Years | Team | Apps | (Gls) |
| 2005–2006 | Portsmouth | 0 | (0) |
| 2006 | → Oxford United (loan) | 4 | (0) |
| 2007–2013 | FC Zürich | 36 | (0) |
| 2014–2017 | FC Chiasso | 94 | (0) |
| 2018–2019 | Rapperswil-Jona | 6 | (0) |
- * Club domestic league appearances and goals

Andrea Guatelli (born 5 May 1984) is an Italian former professional footballer who played goalkeeper.

== Career ==
Born in Parma, Guatelli has played for Parma, Portsmouth, Oxford United, FC Zürich and FC Chiasso.

He signed a two-year contract with Portsmouth in August 2004 following a trial with the club. He moved on loan to Oxford United in March 2006, along with fellow Portsmouth player Liam Horsted. He was one of 7 player released by Portsmouth in May 2006 following the expiry of their contracts.
