= Liam Boyle =

Liam Boyle may refer to:

- Liam Boyle (2000s hurler), Irish hurler who plays with Ballyduff and Kerry
- Liam Boyle (Senior), Irish hurler who played with Ballyduff
- Liam Boyle (actor) (born 1985), British actor

== See also ==
- List of people with given name Liam
