= Liam Fox (disambiguation) =

Liam Fox (born 1961) is a British politician.

Liam Fox may also refer to:

- Liam Fox (footballer) (born 1984), Scottish football player and coach
- Liam Fox (actor) (born 1970), British actor

== See also ==
- List of people with given name Liam
