= Liam Adams =

Liam Adams may refer to:

- Liam Adams (runner) (born 1986), Australian runner
- an Irish rapist, see Public Prosecution Service of Northern Ireland v. Liam Adams
- a comic book character, see Freshmen (comics)
- a fictional footballer from the film Goal III: Taking on the World

== See also ==
- List of people with given name Liam
