= Liam Carroll =

Liam Carroll may refer to:

- Liam Carroll (businessman), Irish real estate developer
- Liam Carroll (hurler), Irish hurler
- Liam Carroll (judoka) (born 1946), Irish judoka

== See also ==
- List of people with given name Liam
