= Liam Hughes =

Liam Hughes may refer to:

- Liam Hughes (footballer, born 1988), English footballer
- Liam Hughes (footballer, born 1992), English footballer
- Liam Hughes (footballer, born 2001), Northern Irish footballer

== See also ==
- List of people with given name Liam
