= Liam Smith =

Liam Smith may also refer to:

- Liam Smith (boxer), English boxer
- Liam Smith (cricketer) (born 1997), English cricketer
- Liam Smith (footballer, born 1995), English footballer
- Liam Smith (footballer, born 1996), Scottish footballer
- Liam Smith, character in The Clinic

== See also ==
- Leon Smith (disambiguation)
- Lee Smith (disambiguation)
- List of people with given name Liam
