= Liam Hayes (disambiguation) =

Liam Hayes may refer to:

- Liam Hayes (Gaelic footballer) (born 1974), Irish Gaelic footballer
- Liam Hayes (hurler), Irish hurler
- Liam Hayes, also known as Plush, is an American musician.

== See also ==
- Hayes (disambiguation)
- List of people with given name Liam
