= Meyrick Buchanan =

Australian cricketer (born 1993)

Personal information
- Born: 15 September 1993 (age 33); Victoria, Australia
- Batting: Right-handed
- Source: ESPNcricinfo, 9 July 2020

Meyrick Buchanan (born 15 September 1993) is an Australian cricketer. After being considered a strong junior prospect in both cricket & Australian rules football, Buchanan withdrew from the 2011 AFL draft to pursue his cricketing opportunities.

He played one Twenty20 match for the Melbourne Renegades in the 2011–12 Big Bash. After losing his Cricket Victoria rookie contract after 2012/13 season, Buchanan switched his focus from cricket to football.

Buchanan represented Geelong Falcons in the 2013 TAC Cup competition. He then played in the VFL for Werribee Tigers in 2014 then Footscray Bulldogs in 2015.

He is the brother of former Victorian Bushrangers cricketer Liam Buchanan and AFL player Amon Buchanan.
