= Lava Records =

American record label

- Parent company: Lava Music, LLC
- Founded: 1995; 31 years ago
- Founder: Jason Flom
- Distributors: Republic Records (United States); Universal Music Group (international); Rhino Entertainment (reissues of pre-2005 catalog)
- Genre: Various
- Country of origin: United States
- Official website: www.lavarecords.com

Lava Records is an American record label owned by Jason Flom, in partnership with Universal Music Group.

== Company history ==
In 1995, Flom launched Lava Records in partnership with Atlantic Records. For the next decade, he continued to discover and champion artists under the Lava label who went on to sell over 100 million records globally, including Matchbox Twenty, Kid Rock, The Corrs, Simple Plan, Blue Man Group, Edwin McCain, Sugar Ray, and Trans-Siberian Orchestra. Flom also signed his first black artist, David Josias, known for his hit single “Mindblowin”.

In 2004, Flom sold Lava Records to Atlantic Records Group, where he was named chairman and CEO of the Atlantic Records Group. In this role, he oversaw a resurgence of the label and continued to sign and break major artists, most notably Paramore.

Following 15 years of success at Atlantic and Lava, Flom was tapped in 2005 as chairman and CEO of Virgin Records. In 2007, he led a merger with Capitol Records to create the Capitol Music Group, where he was named chairman and CEO. During Flom's tenure, he oversaw releases from artists including Lenny Kravitz, Coldplay, and the Rolling Stones. In keeping with his track record of identifying and supporting new talent, under Flom's leadership eleven new artists rose to gold, platinum and multi-platinum status, which included Thirty Seconds to Mars. In 2007 he signed Katy Perry and personally A&R'd her debut album, One of the Boys.

In 2008, Flom departed from Capitol Music Group to re-launch his own Lava Records label, this time in partnership with Universal Music Group's industry-leading Republic Records. There he signed Jessie J, whose 2011 singles under the Lava banner "Do It Like a Dude" and "Price Tag" featuring B.o.B, topped the singles charts in the UK and 17 other countries. Her multi-platinum debut album Who You Are sold over three million copies worldwide.

In 2013, Flom identified Lorde, a then-unknown artist from New Zealand, and Lava released her debut single, "Royals", which stayed at number one on the Billboard Hot 100 for eight weeks, becoming the biggest alternative radio hit by a female artist. Lorde went on to win two Grammy Awards including Song of the Year for "Royals" at the 56th Annual Grammy Awards.

Following successful Lava rock releases from Black Veil Brides and their frontman Andy Black, Flom signed breakthrough rock band Greta Van Fleet to Lava in 2017, who revitalized the global rock scene with multiple number one rock hits and over 1 million albums sold, all while touring over the last several years. When Robert Plant was asked about Greta Van Fleet in an interview with Australia's Network Ten, he proclaimed, "They are Led Zeppelin I," and described 21-year-old Josh Kiszka as "...a beautiful little singer. I hate him." Elton John lauded the band in The Los Angeles Times: "Whoever says rock music is dead is completely wrong. When I first saw them, they knocked me out...They are going to be one of the biggest bands of the year." The band picked up four nominations at the 2018 Grammy Awards and won the Grammy Award for Best Rock Album for their double-EP From the Fires.

Flom founded Lava Publishing in 2014, which includes among its roster of writers break-out alternative rocker Evan Konrad, writer/performer Maty Noyes, and all four members of Greta Van Fleet.

Flom also founded the podcast company Lava for Good, which has produced critically-acclaimed podcasts Bone Valley and Earwitness (about the case of Alabama death row prisoner Toforest Johnson), both of which were named to Entertainment Weekly's list of Top 30 True Crime Podcasts of All Time.

== Label roster ==
=== Current artists ===
- Greta Van Fleet
- The Warning
- Jxdn
- somegirlnamedanna
- Trans-Siberian Orchestra
- Yonaka
- The Wrecks

=== Past artists ===
- David Josias
- Tony C. and the Truth
- Black Veil Brides
- Maty Noyes
- The Royal Concept
- Travis Mills
- Carah Faye
- Clairity
- G4SHI
- Liam Lis
- Jetta
- Jessie J
- Katy Tiz
- Lorde
- The Atomic Fireballs
- Liquid Gang
- Authority Zero
- Bel Canto
- Bif Naked
- The Boondock Saints
- CIV
- Course of Nature
- Cold
- The Corrs
- The Cult
- Egypt Central
- Willa Ford
- Grade 8
- Hot Action Cop
- Little-T And One Track Mike
- Matchbox Twenty
- Edwin McCain
- Nonpoint
- Needtobreathe
- Franky Perez
- Poppy
- Porcupine Tree
- Smile Empty Soul
- Jill Sobule
- Sugar Ray
- Unwritten Law
- Vanessa Williams
- Antigone Rising
- Blue Man Group
- Joe Brooks
- John Butler Trio
- Cherie
- The Click Five
- Embrace
- Kid Rock
- Toby Lightman
- O.A.R.
- Simple Plan
- Skillet
- Skindred
- Uncle Kracker
- Vaux
- Andy Black
- Evan Konrad
- Stanaj
- Hero the Band
- South of Eden
- JunkBunny
- Leo The Kind
- Kat Cunning
