= Liam Gill =

Liam Gill may refer to

- Liam Gill (rugby union) (born 1992), Australian international rugby union player.
- Liam Gill (snowboarder) (born 2003), Canadian Olympic snowboarder.

== See also ==
- List of people with given name Liam
