= Liam O'Brien (disambiguation) =

Liam O'Brien (born 1976) is an American voice actor and voice director.

Liam O'Brien may also refer to:

- Liam O'Brien (Irish actor), Irish actor
- Liam O'Brien (athlete) (born 1954), Irish Olympic athlete
- Liam O'Brien (footballer, born 1964), Irish international football player
- Liam O'Brien (footballer, born 1991), English football player
- Liam O'Brien (hurler) (born 1950), former Irish hurler
- Liam O'Brien (ice hockey) (born 1994), Canadian ice hockey player
- Liam O'Brien (screenwriter) (1913–1996), American screenwriter and television producer

== See also ==
- Liam Ó Briain (1888–1974), Irish language expert and political activist
- List of people with given name Liam
