= Liam Davis =

Liam Davis may refer to:

- Liam Davis (footballer, born 1986), English footballer for Torquay United F.C.
- Liam Davis (footballer, born 1990), English footballer for Cleethorpes Town F.C.
- Liam Davis (cricketer) (born 1984), Australian cricketer
- Liam Davis (swimmer) (born 2000), Zimbabwean swimmer

== See also ==
- Liam Davies (disambiguation)
- Leon Davis (disambiguation)
- List of people with given name Liam
