= Liam McCarthy =

Liam McCarthy may refer to:

- Liam McCarthy (hurler) (born 1963), Irish retired hurler
- Liam McCarthy (cricketer) South African-born Irish cricketer
- Half of the duo of Liam McCarthy and John D. O'Callaghan, Irish school students who won a science award
- Liam MacCarthy (1853–1928), Gaelic Athletic Association patron

== See also ==
- Liam MacCarthy Cup, for winning the All-Ireland Senior Hurling Championship
- List of people with given name Liam
