= Liam Cunningham (disambiguation) =

Liam Cunningham is an actor.

Liam Cunningham may also refer to:

- Liam Cunningham (politician)
- Liam Cunningham (sledge hockey)

== See also ==
- List of people with given name Liam
