= Liam Mitchell =

Liam Mitchell may refer to:

- Liam Mitchell (footballer)
- Liam Mitchell (rugby union)
- Liam Mitchell (voice actor)

== See also ==
- List of people with given name Liam
