= Leon Smith =

Leon Smith may refer to:

- Leon Smith (basketball) (born 1980), American former basketball player
- Leon Smith (naval commander) (died 1869), Texas Marine Department during American Civil War
- Leon Smith (politician) (born 1937), Idaho House of Representatives
- Leon Smith (tennis) (born 1976), Scottish tennis coach
- Leon Kristopher Smith (1978–2011), New Zealand soldier
- Leon Polk Smith (1906–1996), American painter

== See also ==
- Lee Smith (disambiguation)
- Liam Smith (disambiguation)
