= Liam McGrath =

Liam McGrath may refer to:

- Liam McGrath (hurler, born 1974), Irish hurler for Tipperary
- Liam McGrath (hurler, born 1993), Irish hurler for Tipperary

== See also ==
- List of people with given name Liam
