= Oideas Gael =

Oideas Gael (Irish pronunciation: [ˈɪdʲəsˠ ˈɡeːl̪ˠ], meaning "Instruction of the Irish") is an Irish language cultural centre in Glencolmcille, Co. Donegal. It was founded in 1984. One of the founders and a former language director of Oideas Gael is Liam Ó Cuinneagáin, the previous chairman (2002-2012) of Údarás na Gaeltachta.

== See also ==
- Gaeltacht
- Irish language
