= Liam Evans =

Liam Evans may refer to:

- Liam Evans (footballer) (born 1997), Bermudian footballer
- Liam Evans (Holby City), a fictional character on British medical drama television series Holby City
- Liam Evans, a pseudonym used by Andrew Doyle (comedian)

== See also ==
- List of people with given name Liam
