= Liam King =

Liam King may refer to:

- Liam King (footballer) (born 1987), English footballer
- Liam King (hurler) (1940–2026), Irish hurler

== See also ==
- List of people with given name Liam
