= Liam Nolan =

Liam Nolan may refer to:

- Liam Nolan (writer), Irish writer and broadcast journalist
- Liam Nolan (footballer) (born 1994), English footballer
- Liam Nolan (Muay Thai), British Muay Thai fighter

== See also ==
- List of people with given name Liam
