= Liam Kelly =

Liam Kelly may refer to:

- Liam Kelly (footballer, born 1975), Irish former football player
- Liam Kelly (footballer, born 1990), English-born Scottish international footballer, for Rotherham United FC
- Liam Kelly (footballer, born 1995), Irish football player, for Milton Keynes Dons FC
- Liam Kelly (footballer, born 1996), Scottish football goalkeeper
- Liam Kelly (Irish republican) (1922–2011), Irish republican and politician
- Liam Kelly, Irish musician, member of Dervish (band)

== See also ==
- Liam Kelley, American historian of Vietnamese history
- List of people with given name Liam
