= Liam O'Neill (disambiguation) =

Liam O'Neill (1955–2026) was an Irish Gaelic games administrator.

Liam O'Neil(l) or O'Neal may refer to:

== Sportspeople ==
- Liam O'Neill (Gaelic footballer) (born 1947), Irish former Gaelic footballer
- Liam O'Neil (footballer) (born 1993), English footballer for Boreham Wood

== Fictional characters ==
- Liam O'Neal, a Forever Knight character played by Cedric Smith
- Liam O'Neill, a Sons of Anarchy character played by Arie Verveen

== Others ==
- Liam O'Neil (musician) (born 1980), Canadian musician
- Liam O'Neill, Canadian drummer for the band Suuns
- Liam O'Neill (artist) from The Folks on the Hill
- Liam O'Neil, Irish Folk Singer

== See also ==
- List of people with given name Liam
