= Liam Harrison =

Liam Harrison may refer to:

- Liam Harrison (kickboxer) (born 1985), English Muay Thai kickboxer
- Liam Harrison (musician) (born 1953), Irish musician and songwriter
- Liam Harrison (rugby league) (born 1983), Irish rugby league player

== See also ==
- List of people with given name Liam
