= 2023–24 Bemidji State Beavers men's ice hockey season =

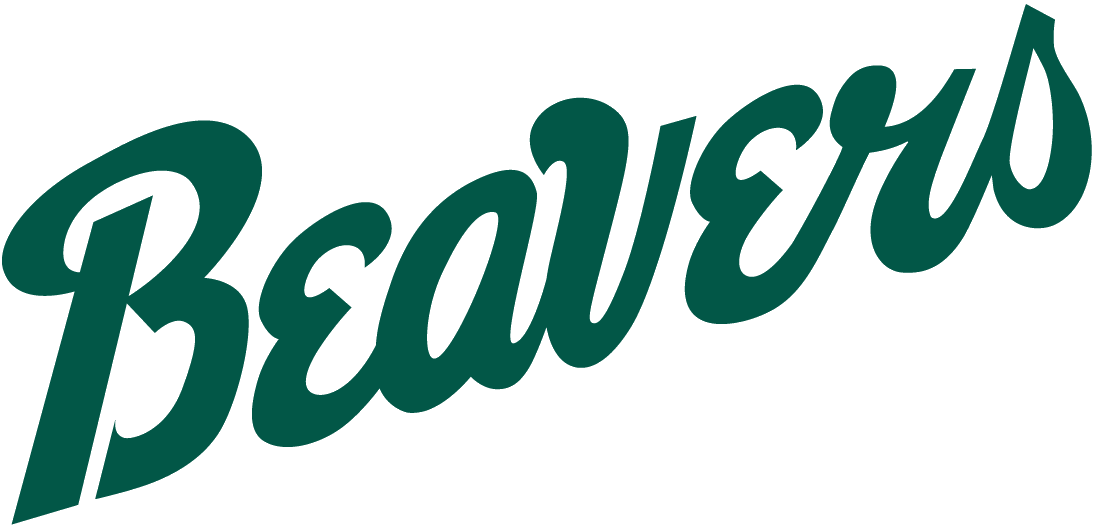

CCHA, champion
- Conference: 1st CCHA
- Home ice: Sanford Center

Rankings
- USCHO: NR
- USA Hockey: NR

Record
- Overall: 20–16–2
- Conference: 15–7–2
- Home: 15–7–0
- Road: 5–9–2

Coaches and captains
- Head coach: Tom Serratore
- Assistant coaches: Travis Winter; Andrew Magera; Brock Kautz
- Captain: Kyle Looft
- Alternate captain(s): Carter Jones; Jackson Jutting; Eric Martin

The 2023–24 Bemidji State Beavers men's ice hockey season was the 68th season of play for the program, the 24th at the Division I level and 3rd in the CCHA. The Beavers represented Bemidji State University, played their home games at Sanford Center and were coached by Tom Serratore in his 23rd season.

== Season ==
Bemidji State's primary concern entering the season was how to replace four of their top five scorers from 2023. Though the leading scorer, Lleyton Roed, was back for his sophomore season, the Beavers would need the rest of the team to step up as well. With the offense still a work in progress, the team had trouble winning early in the season. The team was competitive in most of their games, playing three overtime matches in the first two weeks, but they were only able to win once. Once the team began its conference schedule, Bemidji's hopes were diminished when starting goaltender, Matias Scholl, suffered a lower body injury and was forced to miss several weeks. Though Gavin Enright stepped up against St. Thomas, he wasn't able to sustain that level of play and the team's goals against ballooned.

During that time the offense began to figure itself out. Though they also lost Jackson Jutting for over 2 months due to injury, Bemidji State started seeing major contributions from new quarters. Several returning players posted new career highs and the Beavers were buoyed by the addition of Eric Pohlkamp. When Scholl returned The team was treading water but remained in the hunt for the conference title. He helped the team post a weekend sweep but because of the winter break, the Beavers weren't able to build on that momentum. Instead, Bemidji State lost four of five to kick off the second half of their season.

At the beginning of February, the team was 4 games under .500, however, because many of their losses were in non-conference games, the Beavers still had a good chance to get home ice in the first round of the conference tournament. However, over the final four weeks of the regular season, Bemidji State tore through its opposition. Scholl finally looked to have recovered from his injury while the offense found a consistency that had eluded them all season. The Beavers won eight games in a row (one in a shootout) and missed only two points in the standings. The streak sent BSU rocketing up the rankings and after they shutout Minnesota State in back-to-back games, the Beavers found themselves 9 points ahead of second place.

Bemidji State entered the postseason with much notoriety. Even though Ferris State defeated them in the first game, the Beavers swept their quarterfinal contest and then dispatched Lake Superior State in the semifinals. With a conference championship their only path to the NCAA tournament, Bemidji State had even more to play for against Michigan Tech. Kasper Magnussen gave the team the lead in the first but after that the offense was unable to find the net. Despite firing 28 shots in the final two periods, no more scoring came from the Beavers. Tech was able to summon just enough scoring to take the lead and then hold it in large part due to the performance of their goaltender.

== Departures ==
Player	Position	Nationality	Cause
Ross Armour	Forward	Canada	Graduation (signed with Savannah Ghost Pirates)
Brad Belisle	Forward	Canada	Graduation (signed with Éléphants de Chambéry)
Mike Carr	Goaltender	United States	Graduation (retired)
Mitchell Martan	Forward	Canada	Graduation (signed with Manchester Storm)
Aaron Myers	Forward	United States	Left Program (retired)
Kaden Pickering	Forward	United States	Graduation (signed with Iowa Heartlanders)
Elias Rosén	Defenseman	Sweden	Graduation (signed with Kansas City Mavericks)
Will Zmolek	Defenseman	United States	Graduation (signed with Philadelphia Flyers)

== Recruiting ==
Player	Position	Nationality	Age	Notes
Rhys Chiddenton	Forward	Canada	20	Campbellville, ON
Liam Engström	Forward	Sweden	19	Surahammar, SWE
Kasper Magnussen	Forward	Norway	19	Fredrikstad, NOR
Jake McLean	Forward	Canada	21	North Vancouver, BC
Eric Pohlkamp	Defenseman	United States	19	Brainerd, MN; selected 132nd overall in 2023
Noah Quinn	Forward	Canada	20	Nelson, BC
Raythan Robbins	Goaltender	United States	21	Anchorage, AK

== Roster ==
As of September 15, 2023.

No.	Nat.	Player	Class	Pos	Height	Weight	DoB	Hometown	Previous team	NHL rights
1	(United States)	Gavin Enright	Senior	G	6' 2" (1.88 m)	170 lb (77 kg)	1999-08-26	Farmington, Minnesota	Green Bay Gamblers (USHL)	—
2	(United States)	Tony Follmer	Junior	D	6' 3" (1.91 m)	191 lb (87 kg)	2000-10-26	O'Fallon, Missouri	Lincoln Stars (USHL)	—
3	(United States)	Jack Powell	Senior	D	5' 11" (1.8 m)	176 lb (80 kg)	1999-09-11	Alexandria, Minnesota	Aberdeen Wings (NAHL)	—
5	(United States)	Will Magnuson	Junior	D	5' 10" (1.78 m)	178 lb (81 kg)	2001-10-16	Chaska, Minnesota	Bismarck Bobcats (NAHL)	—
6	(United States)	Mitch Wolfe	Sophomore	D	6' 0" (1.83 m)	183 lb (83 kg)	2002-07-19	Andover, Minnesota	Des Moines Buccaneers (USHL)	—
7	(United States)	Kyle Looft (C)	Graduate	D	6' 4" (1.93 m)	215 lb (98 kg)	1998-06-27	Mankato, Minnesota	Cedar Rapids RoughRiders (USHL)	—
8	(United States)	Adam Flammang	Sophomore	F	6' 0" (1.83 m)	187 lb (85 kg)	2001-11-09	St. Michael, Minnesota	Cedar Rapids RoughRiders (USHL)	—
9	(United States)	Carter Jones (A)	Graduate	F	5' 10" (1.78 m)	174 lb (79 kg)	1999-05-15	Hillyard, Washington	Trail Smoke Eaters (BCHL)	—
11	(Canada)	Eric Martin (A)	Senior	F	5' 11" (1.8 m)	166 lb (75 kg)	2000-06-05	Calgary, Alberta	Drumheller Dragons (AJHL)	—
12	(Finland)	Patrik Satosaari	Sophomore	D	6' 0" (1.83 m)	180 lb (82 kg)	2001-06-18	Jyväskylä, Finland	Lahti Pelicans U20 (U20 SM-sarja)	—
13	(United States)	Donte Lawson	Junior	F	5' 11" (1.8 m)	170 lb (77 kg)	2000-11-03	Taconite, Minnesota	Minnesota Wilderness (NAHL)	—
14	(Sweden)	Liam Engström	Freshman	F	5' 8" (1.73 m)	155 lb (70 kg)	2004-09-17	Surahammar, Sweden	Örebro HK (SHL)	—
15	(Canada)	Logan Acheson	Sophomore	D	5' 11" (1.8 m)	173 lb (78 kg)	2002-04-24	Edmonton, Alberta	Spruce Grove Saints (AJHL)	—
16	(Finland)	Jere Väisänen	Junior	F	6' 0" (1.83 m)	175 lb (79 kg)	2000-07-10	Espoo, Finland	Amarillo Bulls (NAHL)	—
17	(Canada)	Noah Quinn	Freshman	F	6' 1" (1.85 m)	173 lb (78 kg)	2003-06-02	Nelson, British Columbia	Cranbrook Bucks (BCHL)	—
18	(Canada)	Rhys Chiddenton	Freshman	F	6' 0" (1.83 m)	182 lb (83 kg)	2003-05-23	Campbellville, Ontario	Cranbrook Bucks (BCHL)	—
19	(United States)	Jackson Jutting (A)	Senior	F	5' 10" (1.78 m)	196 lb (89 kg)	2001-02-27	Savage, Minnesota	Colorado College (NCHC)	—
20	(United States)	Kirklan Irey	Sophomore	F	5' 11" (1.8 m)	172 lb (78 kg)	2001-01-08	Bismarck, North Dakota	Sioux City Musketeers (USHL)	—
21	(Sweden)	Alexander Lundman	Junior	F	6' 1" (1.85 m)	187 lb (85 kg)	2001-06-17	Norrköping, Sweden	HV71 J20 (J20 Nationell)	—
22	(United States)	Austin Jouppi	Senior	F	5' 11" (1.8 m)	177 lb (80 kg)	2000-04-18	Duluth, Minnesota	Bismarck Bobcats (NAHL)	—
23	(United States)	Eric Pohlkamp	Freshman	D	5' 11" (1.8 m)	205 lb (93 kg)	2004-03-23	Brainerd, Minnesota	Cedar Rapids RoughRiders (USHL)	SJS, 132nd overall 2023
25	(United States)	Vince Corcoran	Sophomore	F	5' 8" (1.73 m)	165 lb (75 kg)	2001-09-21	Plainfield, Illinois	Wichita Falls Warriors (NAHL)	—
26	(Poland)	Jakub Lewandowski	Junior	F	6' 4" (1.93 m)	203 lb (92 kg)	2001-10-25	Toruń, Poland	HC Vítkovice Ridera U20 (Extraliga juniorů)	—
27	(Canada)	Jake McLean	Freshman	F	6' 0" (1.83 m)	183 lb (83 kg)	2002-07-27	North Vancouver, British Columbia	Bismarck Bobcats (NAHL)	—
28	(Norway)	Kasper Magnussen	Freshman	F	6' 1" (1.85 m)	196 lb (89 kg)	2004-02-19	Fredrikstad, Norway	Leksands IF J20 (J20 Nationell)	—
29	(United States)	Lleyton Roed	Sophomore	F	5' 11" (1.8 m)	174 lb (79 kg)	2002-08-08	White Bear Lake, Minnesota	Tri-City Storm (USHL)	—
30	(United States)	Mattias Sholl	Junior	G	5' 10" (1.78 m)	175 lb (79 kg)	2000-09-30	Hermosa Beach, California	Youngstown Phantoms (USHL)	—
35	(United States)	Raythan Robbins	Freshman	G	5' 11" (1.8 m)	187 lb (85 kg)	2002-06-05	Anchorage, Alaska	Muskegon Lumberjacks (USHL)	—

== Standings ==
2023–24 Central Collegiate Hockey Association Standings
	Conference record										Overall record					
	GP	W	L	T	OTW	OTL	SW	PTS	GF	GA	GP	W	L	T	GF	GA
Bemidji State †	24	15	7	2	2	1	2	48	82	64	38	20	16	2	117	111
St. Thomas	24	12	11	1	0	2	0	39	68	62	37	15	20	2	97	105
#19 Michigan Tech*	24	12	10	2	1	2	0	39	63	54	40	19	15	6	109	102
Minnesota State	24	12	10	2	2	1	1	38	73	62	37	18	15	4	111	96
Northern Michigan	24	10	10	4	1	1	2	36	57	67	34	12	16	6	83	105
Bowling Green	24	11	12	1	1	1	1	35	60	69	36	13	22	1	86	116
Lake Superior State	24	11	12	1	2	2	0	34	79	73	38	17	20	1	114	113
Ferris State	24	6	17	1	3	2	1	19	49	80	36	10	24	2	83	125
Augustana ^	0	0	0	0	0	0	0	0	0	0	34	12	18	4	90	105
Championship: March 22, 2024 † indicates conference regular season champion (MacNaughton Cup) * indicates conference tournament champion (Mason Cup)^ Augustana is playing a transition schedule of 16 games against conference opponents that are not counted in the standings Rankings: USCHO.com Top 20 Poll

== Schedule and results ==
Date	Time	Opponent^{#}	Rank^{#}	Site	TV	Decision	Result	Attendance	Record
Exhibition
October 8	6:00 pm	at #3 Minnesota*		3M Arena at Mariucci • Minneapolis, Minnesota (Exhibition)	BTN+	Robbins	L 2–5	8,289	
Ice Breaker Tournament
October 13	7:07 pm	Wisconsin*		Sanford Center • Bemidji, Minnesota (Ice Breaker Game 1)		Sholl	L 3–4 ^{OT}	2,008	0–1–0
October 14	6:07 pm	Army*		Sanford Center • Bemidji, Minnesota (Ice Breaker Game 2)		Enright	W 3–2 ^{OT}	1,986	1–1–0
Regular Season
October 20	7:07 pm	at #14 Minnesota Duluth*		AMSOIL Arena • Duluth, Minnesota		Sholl	L 0–4	5,866	1–2–0
October 21	6:07 pm	#14 Minnesota Duluth*		Sanford Center • Bemidji, Minnesota	FloHockey	Enright	L 4–5 ^{OT}	2,451	1–3–0
October 27	7:07 pm	St. Thomas		Sanford Center • Bemidji, Minnesota	FloHockey	Enright	W 3–2	1,686	2–3–0 (1–0–0)
October 28	6:07 pm	St. Thomas		Sanford Center • Bemidji, Minnesota	FloHockey	Enright	W 2–0	1,643	3–3–0 (2–0–0)
November 3	6:07 pm	at Lake Superior State		Taffy Abel Arena • Sault Ste. Marie, Michigan	FloHockey	Enright	L 3–4 ^{OT}	1,231	3–4–0 (2–1–0)
November 4	5:07 pm	at Lake Superior State		Taffy Abel Arena • Sault Ste. Marie, Michigan	FloHockey	Enright	L 1–5	1,313	3–5–0 (2–2–0)
November 10	7:07 pm	Michigan Tech		Sanford Center • Bemidji, Minnesota	FloHockey	Enright	L 2–4	1,632	3–6–0 (2–3–0)
November 11	6:07 pm	Michigan Tech		Sanford Center • Bemidji, Minnesota	FloHockey	Enright	W 6–4	1,740	4–6–0 (3–3–0)
November 17	7:07 pm	at Minnesota State		Mayo Clinic Health System Event Center • Mankato, Minnesota	KEYC	Enright	L 1–5	4,941	4–7–0 (3–4–0)
November 18	6:07 pm	at Minnesota State		Mayo Clinic Health System Event Center • Mankato, Minnesota	KEYC	Enright	W 7–6	5,008	5–7–0 (4–4–0)
November 24	7:07 pm	at #1 North Dakota*		Ralph Engelstad Arena • Grand Forks, North Dakota	Midco	Enright	L 2–3 ^{OT}	11,631	5–8–0
November 25	6:07 pm	at #1 North Dakota*		Ralph Engelstad Arena • Grand Forks, North Dakota	Midco	Enright	L 0–5	11,690	5–9–0
December 8	7:07 pm	Lake Superior State		Sanford Center • Bemidji, Minnesota	FloHockey	Enright	W 7–1	1,687	6–9–0 (5–4–0)
December 9	6:07 pm	Lake Superior State		Sanford Center • Bemidji, Minnesota	FloHockey	Enright	L 1–6	1,536	6–10–0 (5–5–0)
December 14	7:07 pm	Bowling Green		Sanford Center • Bemidji, Minnesota	FloHockey	Sholl	W 3–1	1,019	7–10–0 (6–5–0)
December 15	7:07 pm	Bowling Green		Sanford Center • Bemidji, Minnesota	FloHockey	Sholl	W 5–2	1,539	8–10–0 (7–5–0)
December 29	7:07 pm	#14 St. Cloud State*		Sanford Center • Bemidji, Minnesota	FloHockey	Sholl	L 1–6	3,998	8–11–0
December 31	6:00 pm	at #14 St. Cloud State*		Herb Brooks National Hockey Center • St. Cloud, Minnesota	Fox 9+	Sholl	L 1–6	4,789	8–12–0
January 5	6:07 pm	at Ferris State		Ewigleben Arena • Big Rapids, Michigan	FloHockey	Sholl	W 4–1	1,504	9–12–0 (8–5–0)
January 6	5:07 pm	at Ferris State		Ewigleben Arena • Big Rapids, Michigan	FloHockey	Sholl	L 3–5	1,734	9–13–0 (8–6–0)
January 19	6:07 pm	at Michigan Tech		MacInnes Student Ice Arena • Houghton, Michigan	FloHockey	Sholl	L 1–2	2,864	9–14–0 (8–7–0)
January 20	6:07 pm	at Michigan Tech		MacInnes Student Ice Arena • Houghton, Michigan	FloHockey	Sholl	T 2–2 ^{SOW}	2,769	9–14–1 (8–7–1)
February 2	7:07 pm	Augustana*		Sanford Center • Bemidji, Minnesota	FloHockey	Sholl	W 5–0	2,050	10–14–1
February 3	6:07 pm	Augustana*		Sanford Center • Bemidji, Minnesota	FloHockey	Sholl	L 2–5	2,435	10–15–1
February 9	6:07 pm	at Northern Michigan		Berry Events Center • Marquette, Michigan	FloHockey	Sholl	W 4–2	2,645	11–15–1 (9–7–1)
February 10	6:07 pm	at Northern Michigan		Berry Events Center • Marquette, Michigan	FloHockey	Sholl	T 3–3 ^{SOW}	3,011	11–15–2 (9–7–2)
February 15	7:07 pm	Ferris State		Sanford Center • Bemidji, Minnesota	FloHockey	Sholl	W 3–2 ^{OT}	1,256	12–15–2 (10–7–2)
February 16	7:07 pm	Ferris State		Sanford Center • Bemidji, Minnesota	FloHockey	Sholl	W 4–1	2,153	13–15–2 (11–7–2)
February 23	7:07 pm	at St. Thomas		St. Thomas Ice Arena • Mendota Heights, Minnesota	FloHockey	Sholl	W 6–5	1,014	14–15–2 (12–7–2)
February 24	6:07 pm	at St. Thomas		St. Thomas Ice Arena • Mendota Heights, Minnesota	FloHockey	Sholl	W 3–1	1,008	15–15–2 (13–7–2)
March 1	7:07 pm	Minnesota State		Sanford Center • Bemidji, Minnesota	FloHockey	Sholl	W 6–0	2,522	16–15–2 (14–7–2)
March 2	7:07 pm	Minnesota State		Sanford Center • Bemidji, Minnesota	FloHockey	Enright	W 2–0	2,402	17–15–2 (15–7–2)
CCHA Tournament
March 8	7:07 pm	Ferris State*		Sanford Center • Bemidji, Minnesota (Quarterfinal Game 1)	FloHockey	Sholl	W 5–4 ^{OT}	1,725	18–15–2
March 9	6:07 pm	Ferris State*		Sanford Center • Bemidji, Minnesota (Quarterfinal Game 2)	FloHockey	Sholl	W 4–0	2,176	19–15–2
March 16	7:07 pm	Lake Superior State*	#20т	Sanford Center • Bemidji, Minnesota (Semifinal)	FloHockey	Sholl	W 4–1	3,048	20–15–2
March 22	7:07 pm	Michigan Tech*	#20	Sanford Center • Bemidji, Minnesota (Championship)	FloHockey	Sholl	L 1–2	4,373	20–16–2
*Non-conference game. ^{#}Rankings from USCHO.com Poll. All times are in Central Time. Source:

== Scoring statistics ==
Name	Position	Games	Goals	Assists	Points	PIM
Lleyton Roed	LW	38	14	16	30	16
Kyle Looft	D	32	6	22	28	14
Eric Martin	F	38	8	18	26	6
Eric Pohlkamp	D	32	11	13	24	18
Carter Jones	F	37	6	18	24	12
Jackson Jutting	F	27	10	12	22	2
Adam Flammang	RW	38	9	10	19	24
Austin Jouppi	F	37	2	17	19	16
Jere Väisänen	F	37	9	8	17	4
Kirklan Irey	F	37	8	7	15	22
Mitch Wolfe	D	38	1	12	13	14
Kasper Magnussen	LW	29	7	4	11	6
Vince Corcoran	D	34	2	9	11	14
Jake McLean	F	38	6	4	10	2
Alexander Lundman	LW/RW	20	3	5	8	4
Rhys Chiddenton	LW	23	2	6	8	4
Donte Lawson	F	17	4	3	7	0
Patrik Satosaari	D	31	1	5	6	8
Liam Engström	F	17	3	2	5	4
Tony Follmer	D	28	1	4	5	4
Will Magnuson	D	32	0	5	5	16
Logan Acheson	D	28	2	2	4	4
Jakub Lewandowski	F	9	1	1	2	4
Noah Quinn	F	18	1	0	1	10
Raythan Robbins	G	3	0	0	0	0
Jack Powell	D	4	0	0	0	0
Gavin Enright	G	15	0	0	0	0
Mattias Sholl	G	24	0	0	0	0
Total			117	203	320	257

== Goaltending statistics ==
Name	Games	Minutes	Wins	Losses	Ties	Goals Against	Saves	Shut Outs	SV %	GAA
Mattias Sholl	24	1428:42	14	8	2	59	595	3	.910	2.48
Gavin Enright	15	792:03	6	8	0	42	285	2	.872	3.18
Raythan Robbins	3	66:55	0	0	0	6	24	0	.800	5.38
Empty Net	-	15:40	-	-	-	4	-	-	-	-
Total	38	2303:20	20	16	2	111	904	5	.891	2.89

== Rankings ==
Poll	Week																										
Poll	Pre	1	2	3	4	5	6	7	8	9	10	11	12	13	14	15	16	17	18	19	20	21	22	23	24	25	26 (Final)
USCHO.com	NR	NR	NR	NR	NR	NR	NR	NR	NR	NR	NR	–	NR	NR	NR	NR	NR	NR	NR	NR	NR	NR	20т	20	NR	–	NR
USA Hockey	NR	NR	NR	NR	NR	NR	NR	NR	NR	NR	NR	NR	–	NR	NR	NR	NR	NR	NR	NR	NR	NR	NR	20	NR	NR	NR

Note: USCHO did not release a poll in weeks 11 and 25.
Note: USA Hockey did not release a poll in week 12.

== Awards and honors ==
Player	Award	Ref
Kyle Looft	CCHA Defenseman of the Year	
Mattias Sholl	CCHA Goaltender of the Year	
Kyle Looft	CCHA Best Defensive Defenseman	
Jackson Jutting	CCHA Best Defensive Forward	
Tom Serratore	CCHA Coach of the Year	
Mattias Sholl	CCHA First Team	
Kyle Looft	CCHA First Team	
Eric Pohlkamp	CCHA First Team	
Lleyton Roed	CCHA First Team	
Eric Pohlkamp	CCHA Rookie Team	
