= Liam Murphy =

Liam Murphy may also refer to:

- Liam Murphy (Gaelic footballer), Irish Gaelic footballer for Kerry
- Liam Murphy (Home and Away), fictional character played by Axle Whitehead
- Liam Murphy (rugby union) (born 1988), Irish-American rugby union player
- Liam Murphy (athlete), Australian racewalker
- Liam Murphy (runner), American middle-distance runner

== See also ==
- List of people with given name Liam
