= Liam Bennett =

Liam Bennett may refer to:

- Liam Bennett (hurler) (1950–2006), Irish hurler
- Liam Bennett (footballer) (born 2001), English footballer

== See also ==
- List of people with given name Liam
