= Leon Davis =

Leon Davis may refer to:

- Leon J. Davis (1906–1992), Polish-born labor leader
- Leon S. Davis (1895–1968), American politician in Oregon
- Leon Davis (footballer) (born 1981), Australian rules footballer
- Leon Davis Jr. (born 1977), American spree killer

== See also ==
- Leeon D. Davis (1930–2007, American aircraft designer
- Liam Davis (disambiguation)
