= Liam Higgins =

Liam Higgins may refer to:

- Liam Higgins (golfer) (born 1942), Irish golfer
- Liam Higgins (Irish footballer), Kerry Gaelic footballer in Ireland
- Liam Higgins (rugby league), English rugby league player
- Liam Higgins (New Zealand footballer), New Zealand association footballer.
- Liam Higgins, a character in the TV series The Chase, played by Christian Cooke

== See also ==
- List of people with given name Liam
