= Liam O'Donovan =

Liam O'Donovan may refer to:

- Liam O'Donovan (Gaelic footballer)
- Liam O'Donovan (Tracy Beaker Returns)

== See also ==
- List of people with given name Liam
