= Liam Griffin =

Liam Griffin may refer to:

- Liam Griffin (hurler) (born 1945/7), retired Irish hurling manager and former player
- Liam Griffin (racing driver) (born 1974), British auto racing driver and

== See also ==
- List of people with given name Liam
