= Liam Fitzpatrick =

Liam Fitzpatrick may refer to:

- Liam Fitzpatrick (Suite Life of Zack & Cody)
- Liam Fitzpatrick (Veronica Mars)

== See also ==
- List of people with given name Liam
