= 2024–25 Bemidji State Beavers men's ice hockey season =

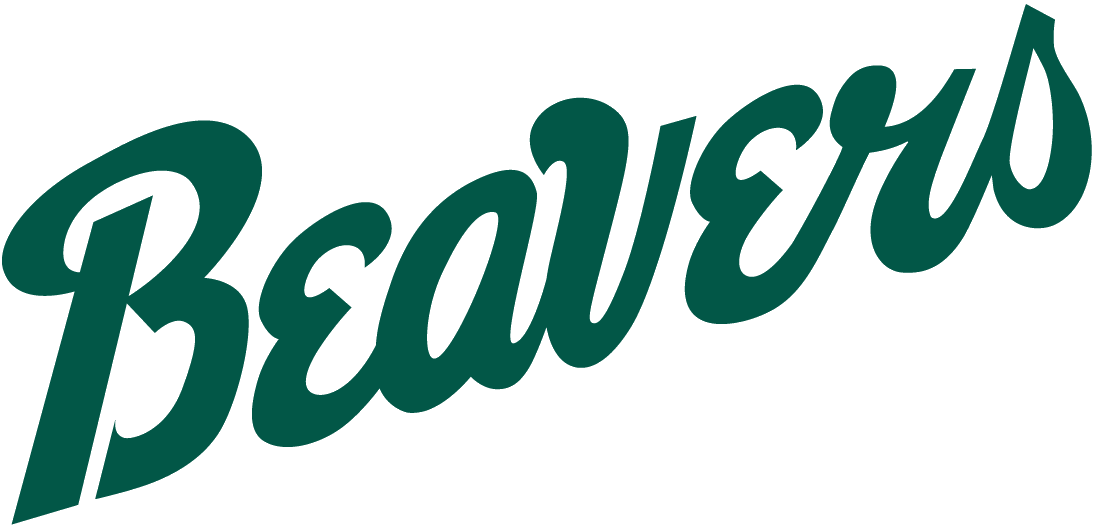
- Conference: T–6th CCHA
- Home ice: Sanford Center

Rankings
- USCHO: NR
- USA Hockey: NR

Record
- Overall: 15–18–5
- Conference: 10–12–4
- Home: 6–8–2
- Road: 9–10–3

Coaches and captains
- Head coach: Tom Serratore
- Assistant coaches: Travis Winter; Andrew Magera; Joe Wegwerth
- Captain: Jackson Jutting
- Alternate captain(s): Austin Jouppi; Eric Martin; Jere Väisänen

The 2024–25 Bemidji State Beavers men's ice hockey season was the 69th season of play for the program, the 25th at the Division I level and 4th in the CCHA. The Beavers represented Bemidji State University, played their home games at Sanford Center and were coached by Tom Serratore in his 24th season.

== Season ==
Bemidji State began the year with a bit of up-and-down play before the team seemed to stabilize in mid-November. While the offense wasn't particularly explosive, it was consistent and the Beavers were able to post a decent record thanks to the efforts of Mattias Sholl in goal. Unfortunately, the senior netminder had a poor stretch in the middle of the season. Despite the defense providing him with a light workload, Sholl began allowing an extra goal or two a game in December and January. That slight increase sent the team into a tailspin by going 2–8–2 in those months.

By the time the club was able to pull out of it, their season was in tatters and Bemidji State was hovering near the bottom of the standings. They finished tied for sixth in the standings, however, had fewer wins than Ferris State so they lost the tie-breaker. Entering the postseason, the Beavers were pitted against one of the season's surprise teams in Augustana. The first game began well for Bemidji and the club carried a narrow lead into the third but the wheels fell off in the final 20 minutes. Sholl surrendered three goals in under 4 minutes while the offense was unable to get a single shot on goal.

After the embarrassing end of the game, the team redoubled its efforts in the rematch. Four different scorers helped the club build two 2-goal leads and they were able to just hold onto the second to even the series. In the deciding match, BSU opened the scoring for the third consecutive game but found themselves trailing as they entered the third. After Noah Quinn tied the match in the back half of the period, the game went into overtime. The back-and-forth action saw both teams trying to score quickly and it was Adam Flammang who became the hero of the evening, scoring the winner from inside the left circle.

The team met Minnesota State in the semifinal but nothing the Beavers did seemed to work. While the managed to outshoot the Mavericks in the match, none of Bemidji State's attempts found the back of the cage and the team was shoutout to end their season.

== Departures ==
Player	Position	Nationality	Cause
Logan Acheson	Defenseman	Canada	Transferred to Alaska
Liam Engström	Forward	Sweden	Signed professional contract (Karlskrona HK)
Gavin Enright	Goaltender	United States	Graduate transfer to St. Cloud State
Carter Jones	Forward	United States	Graduation (signed with Norfolk Admirals)
Jakub Lewandowski	Forward	Poland	Transferred to Northern Michigan
Kyle Looft	Defenseman	United States	Graduation (signed with Texas Stars)
Alexander Lundman	Forward	Sweden	Transferred to Lindenwood
Eric Pohlkamp	Defenseman	United States	Transferred to Denver
Jack Powell	Defenseman	United States	Graduation (retired)
Lleyton Roed	Forward	United States	Signed professional contract (Seattle Kraken)

== Recruiting ==
Player	Position	Nationality	Age	Notes
Reilly Funk	Forward	Canada	23	Portage la Prairie, MB; transfer from Northern Michigan
Ryan Henderson	Defenseman	Canada	20	Lethbridge, AB
Tory Lund	Forward	United States	20	Sartell, MN
A. J. Macaulay	Defenseman	Canada	22	Bonnyville, AB; transfer from Alaska
Jaksen Panzer	Forward	United States	20	Grand Forks, ND
Isa Parekh	Defenseman	Canada	21	Toronto, ON
Carter Randklev	Forward	United States	24	Moorhead, MN; graduate transfer from Niagara
Luke Roelofs	Defenseman	United States	21	Minnetrista, MN
Alexi Sylvestre	Forward	Canada	20	Sainte-Martine, QC
Trent Wiemken	Goaltender	United States	20	Fargo, ND

== Roster ==
As of August 5, 2024.

No.	Nat.	Player	Class	Pos	Height	Weight	DoB	Hometown	Previous team	NHL rights
2	(United States)	Tony Follmer	Senior	D	6' 3" (1.91 m)	191 lb (87 kg)	2000-10-26	O'Fallon, Missouri	Lincoln Stars (USHL)	—
4	(Finland)	Patrik Satosaari	Junior	D	6' 0" (1.83 m)	180 lb (82 kg)	2001-06-18	Jyväskylä, Finland	Lahti Pelicans U20 (U20 SM-sarja)	—
5	(United States)	Will Magnuson	Senior	D	5' 10" (1.78 m)	178 lb (81 kg)	2001-10-16	Chaska, Minnesota	Bismarck Bobcats (NAHL)	—
6	(United States)	Mitch Wolfe	Junior	D	6' 0" (1.83 m)	183 lb (83 kg)	2002-07-19	Andover, Minnesota	Des Moines Buccaneers (USHL)	—
7	(Canada)	Isa Parekh	Freshman	D	6' 0" (1.83 m)	157 lb (71 kg)	2003-09-27	Toronto, Ontario	Nanaimo Clippers (BCHL)	—
8	(United States)	Adam Flammang	Junior	F	6' 0" (1.83 m)	187 lb (85 kg)	2001-11-09	St. Michael, Minnesota	Cedar Rapids RoughRiders (USHL)	—
9	(United States)	Carter Randklev	Graduate	F	5' 8" (1.73 m)	163 lb (74 kg)	1999-11-05	Moorhead, Minnesota	Niagara (AHA)	—
11	(Canada)	Eric Martin (A)	Graduate	F	5' 11" (1.8 m)	166 lb (75 kg)	2000-06-05	Calgary, Alberta	Drumheller Dragons (AJHL)	—
12	(Canada)	A. J. Macaulay	Junior	D	5' 9" (1.75 m)	175 lb (79 kg)	2002-04-12	Bonnyville, Alberta	Alaska (NCAA)	—
13	(United States)	Donte Lawson	Senior	F	5' 11" (1.8 m)	170 lb (77 kg)	2000-11-03	Taconite, Minnesota	Minnesota Wilderness (NAHL)	—
14	(Canada)	Alexi Sylvestre	Freshman	F	6' 2" (1.88 m)	194 lb (88 kg)	2004-08-27	Sainte-Martine, Quebec	Flin Flon Bombers (SJHL)	—
15	(United States)	Jaksen Panzer	Freshman	F	5' 10" (1.78 m)	170 lb (77 kg)	2004-04-08	Grand Forks, North Dakota	Sioux Falls Stampede (USHL)	—
16	(Finland)	Jere Väisänen (A)	Senior	F	6' 0" (1.83 m)	175 lb (79 kg)	2000-07-10	Espoo, Finland	Amarillo Bulls (NAHL)	—
17	(Canada)	Noah Quinn	Sophomore	F	6' 1" (1.85 m)	173 lb (78 kg)	2003-06-02	Nelson, British Columbia	Cranbrook Bucks (BCHL)	—
18	(Canada)	Rhys Chiddenton	Sophomore	F	6' 0" (1.83 m)	182 lb (83 kg)	2003-05-23	Campbellville, Ontario	Cranbrook Bucks (BCHL)	—
19	(United States)	Jackson Jutting (C)	Graduate	F	5' 10" (1.78 m)	196 lb (89 kg)	2001-02-27	Savage, Minnesota	Colorado College (NCHC)	—
20	(United States)	Kirklan Irey	Junior	F	5' 11" (1.8 m)	172 lb (78 kg)	2001-01-08	Bismarck, North Dakota	Sioux City Musketeers (USHL)	—
21	(United States)	Vince Corcoran	Junior	F	5' 8" (1.73 m)	165 lb (75 kg)	2001-09-21	Plainfield, Illinois	Wichita Falls Warriors (NAHL)	—
22	(United States)	Austin Jouppi (A)	Graduate	F	5' 11" (1.8 m)	177 lb (80 kg)	2000-04-18	Duluth, Minnesota	Bismarck Bobcats (NAHL)	—
23	(United States)	Luke Roelofs	Freshman	D	6' 2" (1.88 m)	192 lb (87 kg)	2003-03-17	Minnetrista, Minnesota	Bismarck Bobcats (NAHL)	—
25	(United States)	Tory Lund	Freshman	F	5' 10" (1.78 m)	185 lb (84 kg)	2004-07-30	Sartell, Minnesota	El Paso Rhinos (NAHL)	—
26	(Canada)	Reilly Funk	Junior (RS)	F	6' 3" (1.91 m)	194 lb (88 kg)	2000-12-23	Portage, Manitoba	Northern Michigan (CCHA)	—
27	(Canada)	Jake McLean	Sophomore	F	6' 0" (1.83 m)	183 lb (83 kg)	2002-07-27	North Vancouver, British Columbia	Bismarck Bobcats (NAHL)	—
28	(Norway)	Kasper Magnussen	Sophomore	F	6' 1" (1.85 m)	196 lb (89 kg)	2004-02-19	Fredrikstad, Norway	Leksands IF J20 (J20 Nationell)	—
29	(Canada)	Ryan Henderson	Freshman	D	6' 2" (1.88 m)	170 lb (77 kg)	2004-06-10	Lethbridge, Alberta	Drumheller Dragons (USHL)	—
30	(United States)	Mattias Sholl	Senior	G	5' 10" (1.78 m)	175 lb (79 kg)	2000-09-30	Hermosa Beach, California	Youngstown Phantoms (USHL)	—
33	(United States)	Trent Wiemken	Freshman	G	6' 0" (1.83 m)	170 lb (77 kg)	2004-03-23	Fargo, North Dakota	Austin Bruins (NAHL)	—
35	(United States)	Raythan Robbins	Sophomore	G	5' 11" (1.8 m)	187 lb (85 kg)	2002-06-05	Anchorage, Alaska	Muskegon Lumberjacks (USHL)	—

== Standings ==
2024–25 Central Collegiate Hockey Association standings
	Conference record											Overall record					
	GP	W	L	T	OTW	OTL	SW	PTS	PCT ^	GF	GA	GP	W	L	T	GF	GA
#14 Minnesota State †*	26	18	5	3	3	1	1	56	.718	77	37	39	27	9	3	113	58
Augustana	16	9	5	2	1	1	1	30	.625	48	37	35	18	13	4	97	75
St. Thomas	26	13	9	4	1	1	1	42	.564	76	66	38	19	14	5	111	101
Bowling Green	26	12	10	4	2	3	2	43	.551	69	63	36	18	14	4	90	85
Michigan Tech	26	12	11	3	1	1	1	40	.513	75	69	36	16	17	3	95	96
Ferris State	26	12	13	1	1	0	0	36	.462	74	81	36	13	20	3	89	128
Bemidji State	26	10	12	4	3	1	4	36	.462	63	78	38	15	18	5	93	114
Lake Superior State	26	10	15	1	0	4	0	35	.449	71	76	36	12	22	2	93	115
Northern Michigan	26	4	20	2	1	1	2	16	.205	42	88	34	5	27	2	55	115
Championship: March 21, 2025 † indicates conference regular-season champion (MacNaughton Cup) * indicates conference tournament champion (Mason Cup)^ Because Augustana played a transition schedule of 16 games against conference opponents, winning percentage was used to determine conference position. Rankings: USCHO.com Top 20 Poll

== Schedule and results ==
Date	Time	Opponent^{#}	Rank^{#}	Site	TV	Decision	Result	Attendance	Record
Regular Season
October 5	5:07 pm	at #18 Minnesota Duluth*		AMSOIL Arena • Duluth, Minnesota		Robbins	W 4–3 ^{OT}	6,587	1–0–0
October 11	7:07 pm	at #16 St. Cloud State*		Herb Brooks National Hockey Center • St. Cloud, Minnesota	Fox 9+	Sholl	L 3–4	–	1–1–0
October 12	6:07 pm	#16 St. Cloud State*		Sanford Center • Bemidji, Minnesota	Midco Sports+	Sholl	L 2–3	2,279	1–2–0
October 25	6:07 pm	at Ferris State		Ewigleben Arena • Big Rapids, Michigan	Midco Sports+	Sholl	L 2–4	1,059	1–3–0 (0–1–0)
October 26	5:07 pm	at Ferris State		Ewigleben Arena • Big Rapids, Michigan	Midco Sports+	Sholl	W 3–0	1,011	2–3–0 (1–1–0)
November 1	7:07 pm	#16 Minnesota State		Sanford Center • Bemidji, Minnesota	Midco Sports+	Sholl	W 1–0	1,671	3–3–0 (2–1–0)
November 2	6:07 pm	#16 Minnesota State		Sanford Center • Bemidji, Minnesota	Midco Sports+	Sholl	L 1–2	2,064	3–4–0 (2–2–0)
November 8	7:07 pm	at Augustana		Midco Arena • Sioux Falls, South Dakota	Midco Sports+	Sholl	W 4–3 ^{OT}	2,798	4–4–0 (3–2–0)
November 9	6:07 pm	at Augustana		Midco Arena • Sioux Falls, South Dakota	Midco Sports+	Sholl	L 1–5	2,997	4–5–0 (3–3–0)
November 14	7:07 pm	at #3 Minnesota*		3M Arena at Mariucci • Minneapolis, Minnesota	Fox 9+	Sholl	L 3–5	8,673	4–6–0
November 16	6:07 pm	#3 Minnesota*		Sanford Center • Bemidji, Minnesota	Fox 9+, Midco Sports+	Sholl	W 3–1	3,691	5–6–0
November 22	7:07 pm	St. Thomas		Sanford Center • Bemidji, Minnesota	Midco Sports+	Sholl	T 2–2 ^{SOW}	2,097	5–6–1 (3–3–1)
November 23	6:07 pm	St. Thomas		Sanford Center • Bemidji, Minnesota	Midco Sports+	Sholl	W 2–1	2,082	6–6–1 (4–3–1)
November 29	7:07 pm	#14 North Dakota*		Sanford Center • Bemidji, Minnesota	Midco Sports+	Sholl	W 2–1	4,373	7–6–1
November 30	6:07 pm	at #14 North Dakota*		Ralph Engelstad Arena • Grand Forks, North Dakota	Midco	Sholl	T 3–3 ^{OT}	11,587	7–6–2
December 6	6:07 pm	at Lake Superior State		Taffy Abel Arena • Sault Ste. Marie, Michigan	Midco Sports+	Sholl	W 4–2	678	8–6–2 (5–3–1)
December 7	5:07 pm	at Lake Superior State		Taffy Abel Arena • Sault Ste. Marie, Michigan	Midco Sports+	Sholl	L 3–4	768	8–7–2 (5–4–1)
December 13	7:07 pm	Michigan Tech		Sanford Center • Bemidji, Minnesota	Midco Sports+	Sholl	T 2–2 ^{SOW}	1,926	8–7–3 (5–4–2)
December 14	7:07 pm	Michigan Tech		Sanford Center • Bemidji, Minnesota	Midco Sports+	Sholl	L 5–9	1,856	8–8–3 (5–5–2)
December 31	7:07 pm	Minnesota Duluth*		Sanford Center • Bemidji, Minnesota	Midco Sports+	Sholl	L 2–4	3,142	8–9–3
January 3	7:07 pm	Manitoba*		Sanford Center • Bemidji, Minnesota (Exhibition)	Midco Sports+	Robbins	W 5–0	1,796	
January 10	6:07 pm	at Bowling Green		Slater Family Ice Arena • Bowling Green, Ohio	Midco Sports+	Sholl	L 3–4 ^{OT}	1,059	8–10–3 (5–6–3)
January 11	5:07 pm	at Bowling Green		Slater Family Ice Arena • Bowling Green, Ohio	Midco Sports+	Sholl	T 4–4 ^{SOW}	2,553	8–10–4 (5–6–4)
January 17	7:07 pm	Northern Michigan		Sanford Center • Bemidji, Minnesota	Midco Sports+	Sholl	L 1–4	2,142	8–11–4 (5–7–4)
January 18	6:07 pm	Northern Michigan		Sanford Center • Bemidji, Minnesota	Midco Sports+	Sholl	L 1–3	1,599	8–12–4 (5–8–4)
January 25	6:07 pm	at St. Thomas		St. Thomas Ice Arena • Mendota Heights, Minnesota	Midco Sports+	Sholl	L 2–3	987	8–13–4 (5–9–4)
January 26	3:07 pm	at St. Thomas		St. Thomas Ice Arena • Mendota Heights, Minnesota	Midco Sports+	Sholl	W 2–1	954	9–13–4 (6–9–4)
January 31	7:07 pm	Ferris State		Sanford Center • Bemidji, Minnesota	Midco Sports+	Sholl	L 1–5	1,829	9–14–4 (6–10–4)
February 1	6:07 pm	Ferris State		Sanford Center • Bemidji, Minnesota	Midco Sports+	Robbins	L 1–3	1,692	9–15–4 (6–11–4)
February 7	6:07 pm	at Michigan Tech		MacInnes Student Ice Arena • Houghton, Michigan	Midco Sports+	Sholl	W 5–3	3,856	10–15–4 (7–11–4)
February 8	4:07 pm	at Michigan Tech		MacInnes Student Ice Arena • Houghton, Michigan	Midco Sports+	Sholl	W 6–5 ^{OT}	3,821	11–15–4 (8–11–4)
February 21	7:07 pm	Bowling Green		Sanford Center • Bemidji, Minnesota	Midco Sports+	Sholl	W 3–2	1,896	12–15–4 (9–11–4)
February 22	6:07 pm	Bowling Green		Sanford Center • Bemidji, Minnesota	Midco Sports+	Sholl	W 2–1 ^{OT}	1,796	13–15–4 (10–11–4)
February 28	7:07 pm	at #14 Minnesota State		Mayo Clinic Health System Event Center • Mankato, Minnesota	Midco Sports+	Sholl	T 1–1 ^{SOW}	4,497	13–15–5 (10–11–5)
March 1	6:07 pm	at #14 Minnesota State		Mayo Clinic Health System Event Center • Mankato, Minnesota	Midco Sports+	Sholl	L 1–5	4,908	13–16–5 (10–12–5)
CCHA Tournament
March 7	7:07 pm	at Augustana*		Midco Arena • Sioux Falls, South Dakota (CCHA Quarterfinal Game 1)	Midco Sports+	Sholl	L 1–3	3,116	13–17–5
March 8	6:07 pm	at Augustana*		Midco Arena • Sioux Falls, South Dakota (CCHA Quarterfinal Game 2)	Midco Sports+	Sholl	W 4–3	3,085	14–17–5
March 9	5:07 pm	at Augustana*		Midco Arena • Sioux Falls, South Dakota (CCHA Quarterfinal Game 3)	Midco Sports+	Sholl	W 3–2 ^{OT}	2,895	15–17–5
March 15	7:07 pm	at #15 Minnesota State*		Mayo Clinic Health System Event Center • Mankato, Minnesota (CCHA Semifinal)	Midco Sports+	Sholl	L 0–4	3,557	15–18–5
*Non-conference game. ^{#}Rankings from USCHO.com Poll. All times are in Central Time. Source:

== Scoring statistics ==
Name	Position	Games	Goals	Assists	Points	PIM
Kirklan Irey	F	38	11	13	24	14
Eric Martin	F	37	10	13	23	8
Reilly Funk	C	36	7	16	23	21
Jackson Jutting	F	38	14	8	22	4
Jere Väisänen	F	38	7	12	19	16
Adam Flammang	RW	38	5	13	18	27
Isa Parekh	D	35	3	15	18	18
Kasper Magnussen	LW	37	7	9	16	44
Patrik Satosaari	D	30	3	7	10	4
Vince Corcoran	D	30	1	8	9	8
Noah Quinn	F	21	6	2	8	12
Mitch Wolfe	D	38	2	6	8	12
Donte Lawson	F	36	3	4	7	2
Jake McLean	F	33	2	5	7	2
Austin Jouppi	LW	33	2	5	7	12
Tony Follmer	D	38	2	5	7	16
Carter Randklev	F	18	4	2	6	6
Jaksen Panzer	F	26	2	3	5	2
Will Magnuson	D	35	1	4	5	21
Rhys Chiddenton	LW	17	0	4	4	4
Tory Lund	F	8	0	3	3	0
A. J. Macaulay	D	28	0	2	2	4
Alexi Sylvestre	C/RW	9	1	0	1	0
Luke Roelofs	D	18	0	1	1	6
Mattias Sholl	G	37	0	1	1	0
Trent Wiemken	G	1	0	0	0	0
Raythan Robbins	G	3	0	0	0	0
Ryan Henderson	D	7	0	0	0	2
Total			93	161	254	277

== Goaltending statistics ==
Name	Games	Minutes	Wins	Losses	Ties	Goals Against	Saves	Shut Outs	SV %	GAA
Raythan Robbins	4	104:25	1	1	0	4	31	0	.886	2.30
Mattias Sholl	37	2181:22	14	17	5	102	890	2	.897	2.81
Empty Net	-	35:44	-	-	-	8	-	-	-	-
Total	38	2321:31	15	18	5	114	921	2	.890	2.95

== Rankings ==
Poll	Week																											
Poll	Pre	1	2	3	4	5	6	7	8	9	10	11	12	13	14	15	16	17	18	19	20	21	22	23	24	25	26	27 (Final)
USCHO.com	NR	NR	NR	NR	NR	NR	NR	NR	NR	NR	NR	NR	–	NR	NR	NR	NR	NR	NR	NR	NR	NR	NR	NR	NR	NR	–	NR
USA Hockey	NR	NR	NR	NR	NR	NR	NR	NR	NR	NR	NR	NR	–	NR	NR	NR	NR	NR	NR	NR	NR	NR	NR	NR	NR	NR	NR	NR

Note: USCHO did not release a poll in week 12 or 26.
Note: USA Hockey did not release a poll in week 12.

== Awards and honors ==
Player	Award	Ref
Jackson Jutting	CCHA Best Defensive Forward	
Isa Parekh	CCHA All-Rookie Team	

== Players drafted into the NHL ==
Round	Pick	Player	NHL team
7	209	Maxon Vig ^{†}	Montreal Canadiens

† incoming freshman
