= Liam Coyle =

Liam Coyle is the name of:

- Liam Coyle (footballer, born 1968), Northern Irish footballer
- Liam Coyle (footballer, born 1999), English footballer

== See also ==
- List of people with given name Liam
