= Liam Kennedy =

Liam Kennedy may refer to:

- Liam Kennedy (academic), Irish academic, professor and director of the Clinton Institute for American Studies at University College Dublin
- Liam Kennedy (historian), Irish historian, emeritus professor of history at Queen's University Belfast

== See also ==
- List of people with given name Liam
