= Liam Doyle =

Liam Doyle may refer to:

- Liam Doyle (hurler) (born 1969), Irish hurler
- Liam Doyle (Gaelic footballer), Gaelic football player from County Down, Northern Ireland
- Liam Doyle (footballer) (born 1992), Manx footballer
- Liam Doyle (baseball) (born 2004), baseball player

== See also ==
- List of people with given name Liam
