= Liam Watson =

Liam Watson may refer to:

- Liam Watson (footballer) (born 1970), English football manager and former footballer
- Liam Watson (hurler) (born 1983), Irish hurler
- Liam Watson (record producer), British record producer and owner of Toe Rag Studios

== See also ==
- List of people with given name Liam
