= Liam Donnelly =

Liam Donnelly may refer to:

- Liam Donnelly (footballer) (born 1996), Northern Irish footballer
- Liam Donnelly (hurler) (born 1928), Dublin hurler
- Liam Donnelly (swim coach), Canadian competitive swimmer and coach

== See also ==
- List of people with given name Liam
