= Liam Gordon =

Liam Gordon might refer to:

- Liam Gordon (footballer, born 1996), Scottish footballer
- Liam Gordon (footballer, born 1999), English-Guyanese footballer

== See also ==
- List of people with given name Liam
