= Liam Tuohy =

Liam Tuohy may refer to:

- Liam Tuohy (actor), Irish actor
- Liam Tuohy (footballer) (1933–2016), Irish footballer and manager

== See also ==
- List of people with given name Liam
