= Liam Walsh =

Liam Walsh may refer to:

- Liam Walsh (boxer) (born 1986), English boxer
- Liam Walsh (footballer) (born 1997), English footballer
- Liam Walsh (cyclist) (born 2001), Australian cyclist
- Liam Walsh (hurler) (born 1963), Irish former hurler
- Liam Walsh (rugby league) (1998–2021), rugby league footballer

== See also ==
- List of people with given name Liam
