= Liam Hennessy =

Liam Hennessy may refer to:

- Liam Hennessy (footballer) (born 1932), former Irish football player
- Liam Hennessy (coach) (born 1958), coach and former international pole vaulting athlete

== See also ==
- List of people with given name Liam
