= Liam Noble =

Liam Noble may refer to:

- Liam Noble (footballer) (born 1991), English professional footballer
- Liam Noble (musician) (born 1968), British jazz pianist, composer, arranger and educator

== See also ==
- List of people with given name Liam
