= Liam Ayad =

Ivorian footballer (born 1998)

Personal information
- Full name: Bile Bi Bah Liam Ayad
- Date of birth: 27 June 1998 (age 28)
- Place of birth: Vavoua, Ivory Coast
- Height: 1.87 m (6 ft 2 in)
- Position: Midfielder

Team information
- Current team: Moralo

Senior career*
Years	Team	Apps	(Gls)
2018–2021	Extremadura	4	(0)
2018–2019	→ Extremadura B	28	(0)
2019–2020	→ Ebro (loan)	21	(1)
2021	Atlético Baleares	5	(0)
2021–2022	Salamanca	21	(0)
2022–2023	St. Lucia	23	(1)
2023–2024	Radnički Niš	2	(0)
2025	Conquense	4	(1)
2025–	Moralo	1	(1)
- * Club domestic league appearances and goals as of 21 September 2025

Bile Bi Bah Liam Ayad (born 27 June 1998) is an Ivorian footballer who plays as a midfielder for Spanish Tercera Federación club Moralo.

== Career ==
Born in Vavoua, Ivory Coast, he began his career with in Spain with Extremadura UD in 2020. He made four appearances for the senior team but spent time on loan with CD Ebro and CD Atlético Baleares over the next year. In summer 2021 he joined Salamanca CF UDS, playing in the Spanish Segunda División, before moving to Malta to play with St. Lucia F.C. in summer 2022. A year later, he moved to Serbia and signed with FK Radnički Niš.
