= Liam Coleman (banker) =

British banker (born 1966)

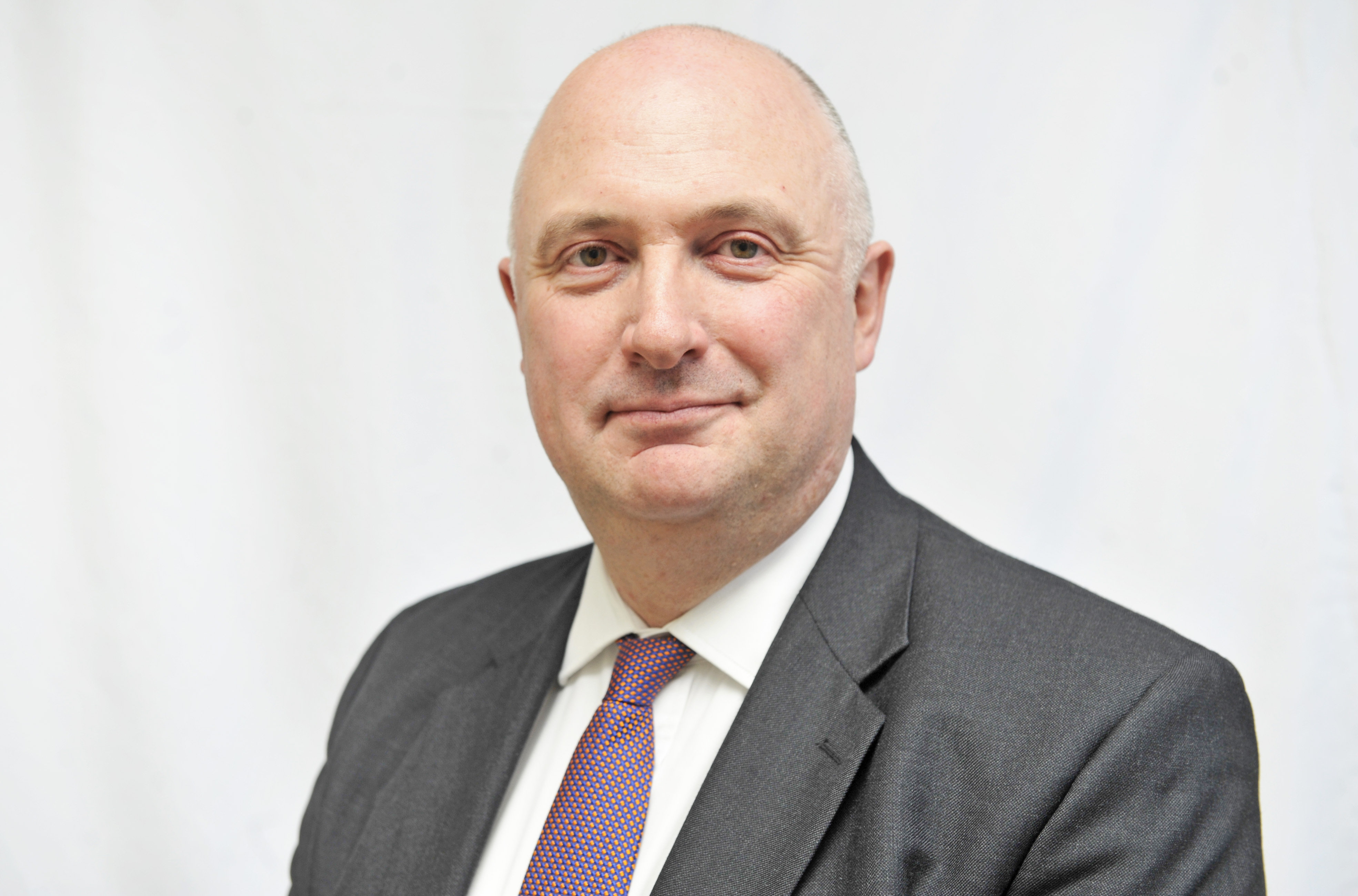

Liam John Coleman (born October 1966) is the former chief executive officer of The Co-operative Bank. He replaced Niall Booker at the end of 2016. He was formerly deputy chief executive at the bank and before that a director of Nationwide Building Society. Coleman has a BA in geography from the University of Manchester and an MBA from the University of Warwick.
