= Liam Lynch (writer) =

Irish playwright (1937–1989)

- Born: 1937; Dublin, Ireland
- Died: 1989 (aged 51–52)
- Writing career
- Language: English
- Years active: 1962–89
- Subjects: Irish diaspora, mental illness
- Notable works: Do Thrushes Sing in Birmingham? Krieg

Liam Lynch (1937 – 1989) was an Irish playwright and novelist of the 20th century, best known for his 1962 play Do Thrushes Sing in Birmingham? and 1982 play Krieg.

== Early life ==
Lynch was born in 1937 in Dublin; his father was a sergeant in the Garda Síochána. Lynch later lived in County Cork and County Limerick, Birmingham and Manchester before returning to Dublin.

== Career ==
Lynch's play Do Thrushes Sing in Birmingham? was shown at the Abbey Theatre in 1963, while Soldier was shown in the Peacock in 1969. Strange Dreams Unending was broadcast by RTÉ in 1973. He also wrote three novels.

Lynch received bursaries from the Arts Council in 1983 and in 1986. He was elected to the elite artistic institution Aosdána.

== Personal life ==
Lynch died in 1989, reputedly of AIDS.

== Works ==
=== Plays ===
- Do Thrushes Sing in Birmingham? (1962)
- Soldier (1969)
- Strange Dreams Unending (1974)
- Krieg (1982)
- Voids (1982)

=== Novels ===
- Shell, Sea Shell (1983)
- Tenebrae: A Passion (1985)
- The Pale Moon of Morning (1995, posthumous)
