= Liam Horsted =

English footballer (born 1985)

Personal information
- Full name: Liam Anthony Horsted
- Date of birth: 29 October 1985 (age 41)
- Place of birth: Portsmouth, England
- Position: Winger

Youth career
- Portsmouth

Senior career*
Years	Team	Apps	(Gls)
2005–2006	Portsmouth	0	(0)
2005–2006	→ Dunfermline Athletic (loan)	11	(0)
2006	→ Oxford United (loan)	4	(0)
2006–2007	Bognor Regis Town		
- Cirencester Town
- Havant & Waterlooville
- Paulsgrove
2013	AFC Portchester		
Total		15	(0)
- * Club domestic league appearances and goals

Liam Anthony Horsted (born 29 October 1985) is an English former professional footballer who played as a winger.

== Career ==
Horsted moved from Portsmouth to Dunfermline Athletic in August 2005 on a six-month loan deal. He moved on loan to Oxford United in March 2006, along with fellow Portsmouth player Andrea Guatelli. He was one of seven players released by Portsmouth in May 2006 following the expiry of their contracts.

Horsted later played non-league football - he spent the 2006–07 season with Bognor Regis Town, and he later played for Cirencester Town, Havant & Waterlooville, Paulsgrove and AFC Portchester.
