= Liam Rowe =

Australian rules football umpire

Personal information
- Full name: Liam Rowe
- Nickname: Rowey
- Height: 188 cm (6 ft 2 in)

Umpiring career
Years	League	Role	Games
2014–2017	AFL	Field umpire	1

Liam Rowe is an Australian rules football umpire who has officiated in the Australian Football League.

Before umpiring in the AFL, he umpired in the North East Australian Football League, officiating in the 2013 Grand Final. He was appointed to the AFL rookie list in 2014, and made his debut, as an emergency umpire replacing an injured Scott Jeffery, in a match between Greater Western Sydney and Fremantle in Round 22, 2016. He left the AFL rookie list at the end of the 2017 season.
