= Liam Forsyth =

English rugby league footballer (born 1996)

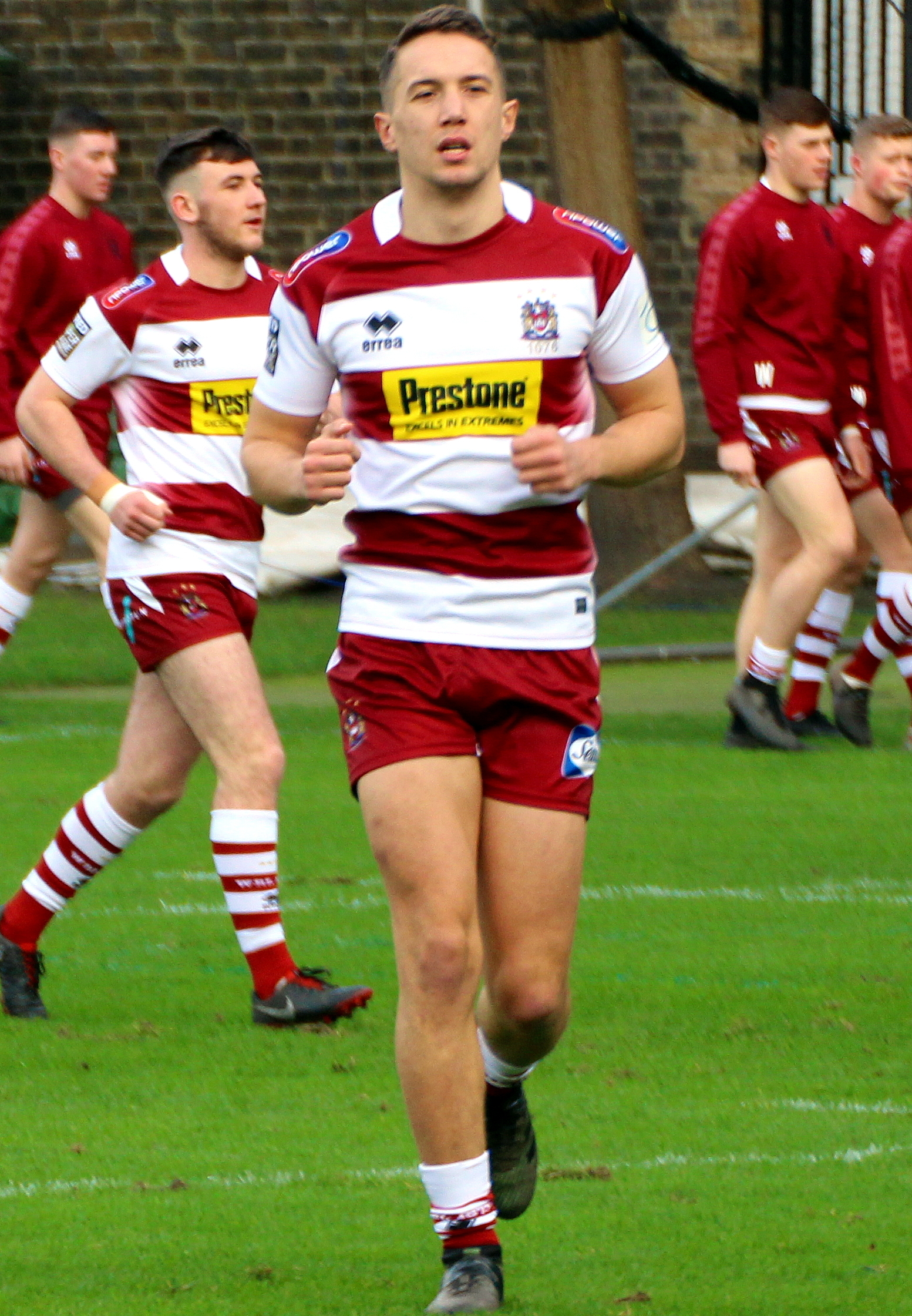

Personal information
- Born: 23 March 1996 (age 30) England
- Height: 6 ft 4 in (1.93 m)
- Weight: 15 st 12 lb (101 kg)

Playing information
- Position: Wing, Centre
Club
Years	Team	Pld	T	G	FG	P
2017–19	Wigan Warriors	14	3	0	0	12
2017(loan)	→ Swinton Lions	6	5	0	0	20
2018(loan)	→ Swinton Lions	5	1	0	0	4
2019(loan)	→ Swinton Lions	13	6	0	0	24
2019–20	Leigh Centurions	11	12	0	0	48
2021–22	Swinton Lions	2	2	0	0	8
	Total	51	29	0	0	116
- Source: As of 8 January 2023

Liam Forsyth (born 23 March 1996) is a former professional rugby league footballer who last played as a winger or centre for the Swinton Lions in the Championship. He retired from playing in July 2022 due to injury.

He has played for the Wigan Warriors in the Super League, and on loan from Wigan at Swinton in the Championship. Forsyth has also played for the Leigh Centurions in the Championship.

== Playing career ==
He made his professional début in 2015 for Bath rugby union team, signing for Bath Rugby Academy.

=== Wigan Warriors ===
In 2017 he made his Wigan Warriors Super League début against the Warrington Wolves.

=== Swinton Lions ===
On 1 September 2020 it was announced that Forsyth would move to the Swinton Lions on a permanent basis.
