= Liam Nevin =

Irish writer (born 1951)

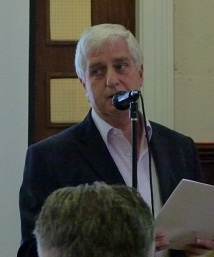
- Nevin speaking in Donaghpatrick in 2013
- Born: Liam Nevin; 1 March 1951 (age 74); Maynooth, Ireland

Liam Nevin is an Irish writer (born 1951), known for his books touching on tobacco-growing in Ireland and on Irish rural childhood.

== Early life ==
Nevin was born in 1951 and grew up in Maynooth, County Kildare, the second youngest of eight children. He moved to London in 1972, where he now lives and works.

== Publications ==
While researching a family tree, Nevin came across papers detailing the growing of tobacco at Randlestown House outside Navan, County Meath, which was the family seat of Sir Nugent Everard. Nevin compiled the documents to produce The Tobacco Fields of Meath which details the difficulties and challenges faced by Sir Nugent and the estate's under-steward, Liam's grandfather John Nevin, in their tobacco experiment. The book also mentions the history of tobacco-growing in Ireland and country life in the early 20th century.

Nevin's second book was published in September 2016 and is a fictionalised version of childhood in rural Ireland in the 1960s.

== Publications ==
- The Tobacco Fields of Meath, 2012. ISBN 978-1907522260.
- Brightening Over Dillon's: Memories of days gone by, 2016. ISBN 978-0957672994
