= Liam Meaney =

Irish hurler

Personal information
- Native name: Liam Ó Maonaigh (Irish)
- Born: 1972 (age 53–54) Bishopstown, Cork, Ireland
- Occupations: Owner at Traders; Mortgage Services Limited

Sport
- Sport: Hurling
- Position: Midfield
Clubs
- Years: Club
- Bishopstown; Blackrock; St Michael's
Club titles
- Cork titles: 3
Inter-county*
Years	County	Apps (scores)
1992-1997	Cork	0 (0-00)
Inter-county titles
- Munster titles: 0
- All-Irelands: 0
- NHL: 1
- All Stars: 0
- *Inter County team apps and scores correct as of 13:16, 8 August 2014.

Liam Meaney (born 1972) is an Irish retired hurler who played as a midfielder for the Cork senior team.

Born in Bishopstown, Meaney first played competitive hurling during his schooling at St Flannan's College. He arrived on the inter-county scene at the age of seventeen when he first linked up with the Cork minor teams as a dual player, before later joining the under-21 sides. He joined the senior panel during the 1992-93 National League. Meaney won one National Hurling League medal as a non-playing substitute.

At club level Meaney is a three-time championship medallist with Blackrock. He also played Gaelic football with St Michael's while he began his career with Bishopstown.

Meaney was later appointed general manager of Cork City F. C.

== Honours ==
=== Team ===
St Flannan's college

- Dr. Harty Cup (2): 1989, 1990

Bishopstown

- Cork Intermediate Hurling Championship (1): 1992

Blackrock

- Cork Senior Hurling Championship (3): 1999, 2000, 2001

Cork

- National Hurling League (1): 1992-93
- Munster Under-21 Hurling Championship (1): 1993
- Munster Minor Hurling Championship (1): 1990
