= Liam Robinson =

Liam Robinson may refer to:

- Liam Robinson (footballer) (born 1965), English footballer
- Liam Robinson (politician) (born 1983), British Labour and Co-operative Party politician

== See also ==
- Robinson (name)
