= Liam Garvo =

American film director

Liam Garvo is producer who has worked across multiple mediums producing music promos, adverts, short films and features.

== Early career ==
Liam began his film career in 2007 when he directed and entered a 30-second teaser trailer for a new book (The Missing) into a competition being held by Penguin Books. Liam's entry went on to win the competition and was consequently screened before Spider-Man 3 at the Odeon, Leicester Square, London UK.

== Later work ==
Liam co-founded Dresden Pictures with producing partner James Heath. Their first feature film, The Fitzroy, has just been completed and is due for release early 2017.

The Fitzroy won the Special Jury Recognition and Audience awards for Excellence in Title Design at the 2015 South by Southwest (SXSW) film festival.
