= Liam Bradley =

Liam Bradley may refer to:

- Liam Bradley (Gaelic footballer), commonly known by his nickname Baker, Irish former Gaelic football manager and player
- Liam Bradley (musician) (born 1943), Australian musician and composer
- Liam Bradley, Irish musician member of the Irish band Beoga
