= Liam Byrne (disambiguation) =

Liam Byrne is a British politician.

Liam Byrne may also refer to:

- Liam Byrne (rugby league), Ireland international rugby league footballer
- Liam Byrne (Irish criminal), Irish criminal
