= Liam O'Connor (Irish musician) =

- Born: Newmarket, Ireland
- Genre: Irish traditional music
- Occupation: Musician
- Instrument: Accordion

Liam O'Connor is a multi-instrumentalist musician, once referred to as "the Jimi Hendrix of the accordion".

== Early life ==
Liam O'Connor was born in Newmarket, County Cork, Ireland, to a musical family. At the age of 10 he joined his family's band, The O'Connor Family. The band was composed of O'Connor, his three brothers and his three sisters. They travelled the country playing with Comhaltas Ceoltóirí Éireann. He now lives in Killarney, County Kerry.

== Music career ==
O'Connor signed a contract with MCA Universal Music in 1993 and released his debut album The Awakening with vocalist Lisa Aherne. The album was nominated for an IRMA award and caught the attention of Michael Flatley and Lord of the Dance. O'Connor toured with Lord of the Dance for two and a half years.

He is the only Irish musician to be asked to perform at the Ryder Cup twice and performed at the All-Ireland Football and Hurling Finals in Ireland's National Stadium Croke Pairc seven times.

In 2006, O'Connor recorded the official anthem for the Gaelic Athletic Association (GAA) "Morning Dew" with GAA broadcasting legend Mícheál Ó Muircheartaigh and topped the Irish charts for six weeks.

O'Connor was listed in the Guinness Book of Records in 2008 as having the fastest fingers in the world on the accordion. He has appeared on numerous television programs including Gay Byrne's The Late Late Show, Kenny Live, RTÉ's Live at 3, Open House, Michael Aspel's This Is Your Life, Seoige and O'Shea, Vodafone Allstars, Michael Flatley's tribute on The Late Late Show, Christie Hennessy's TV documentary, RTÉ News, Pat Kenny's Late Late Show, and Ryan Tubridy's Late Late Show.

In 2010, O'Connor released the album Tico Mystico, produced by John Themis.

O'Connor frequently performs at the Killarney Avenue Hotel from May to October in Killarney as the Liam O'Connor Show.

O'Connor also frequently collaborates with local secondary school St. Brendan's College, Killarney.

== Personal life ==
O'Connor has 3 children.

== Discography ==
Album	Performers	Date
The Awakening	Liam O'Connor and Lisa Aherne	1996
Live at City West Hotel	Liam O'Connor and Lisa Aherne	2001
Reel Spirit	Liam O'Connor and Lisa Aherne	2003
The Morning Dew	Liam O'Connor	2006
Tico Mystico	Liam O'Connor	2010
Live at Ronnie Scott's	Liam O'Connor	2013

== Credits ==
Album	Performers	Role	Date
Lord of the Dance	Original Cast	Accordion	1997
Feet of Flames	Lord of the Dance Cast	Accordion	1999
The Two of Us	Christie Hennessy	Accordion	2008
The Day of My Return	Mike Denver	Accordion	2009

== Recognition ==
Award	Date
1st Ambassador of Killarney, Ireland	2010
IRMA Nomination	1996
Beamish & Crawford Award	
Guinness World Record- Fastest Fingers	2008
