= Liam Ó Buachalla (historian) =

Irish historian, educator and Irish language activist

Liam Ó Buachalla (died 1 November 1966) was a historian from Cork county. Between 1938 and 1966 he published a number of articles concerning the early medieval history of Ireland and the local history of Cork in the Journal of the Cork Historical and Archaeological Society (JCHAS). His works were a considerable contribution to the field of early medieval history of Ireland. Most of them, especially his long article "Contributions towards the political history of Munster, 450–800 A.D." are still widely quoted and discussed by major scholars, including F.J. Byrne, T.M. Charles-Edwards, P. Ó Riain. A compendium of his articles was published locally in 1988.
