= Liam Ó Cuinneagáin =

Liam Ó Cuinneagáin served ten years as chairperson of Údarás na Gaeltachta (2002-2012). He is also an educationalist in the Irish language.

Ó Cuinneagáin trained as a teacher in St. Patrick's College in Drumcondra, Dublin. He was School Principal and teacher in Dublin's inner-city from 1972–1994. He also studied BA and HDip in University College Dublin, where he took Psychology and Modern Irish.

He was one of the founders of Oideas Gael in 1984 in Glencolmcille, Co. Donegal, which organises language classes for adults in the Irish language, and is its current language director. His co-founder was Dr Seosamh Watson, a Gaelic scholar from the Presbyterian tradition in Belfast and later to become Professor of Modern Irish at University College Dublin. Liam was a recipient the annual "Gradam an Phiarsaigh" trophy for services to education and the Irish language (2011). He was also selected as Donegal Person of the Year in 2013 in recognition of his work as Oideas Gael director. Oideas Gael is internationally known as a destination for Irish language learners worldwide. It is also the chosen school where President Mary McAleese came to study Irish and continues to do so as former Uachtarán na hÉireann.

Liam was also involved in the prominent campaign of the Emigrant Vote and was a member of 'Feachtas Náisiúnta Teilifíse' the successful campaign for an Irish Language Television station.
