= Liam MacIntyre =

Scottish shinty player (born 1983)

Liam MacIntyre (born 1983) is a shinty player from Oban, Scotland. He currently plays for Fort William Shinty Club

== Playing career ==
MacIntyre started out his career with Oban Camanachd, a club which his family has a long connection with. He then transferred to Fort William in 2006 and made an immediate impact, having been involved in that club's Camanachd Cup wins.

He then re-signed for Oban in 2008, but his second spell at the club was marred by major discipline problems, including several lengthy bans.

He then re-signed for Fort in the midst of the 2010 season and was instrumental in man-marking Kingussie's Ronald Ross out of the 2010 Camanachd Cup Final victory by Fort.

MacIntyre works as a mathematics teacher in South Lanarkshire at Calderside Academy, Glasgow.
