= Elska =

Bi-monthly magazine dedicated to male photography and culture

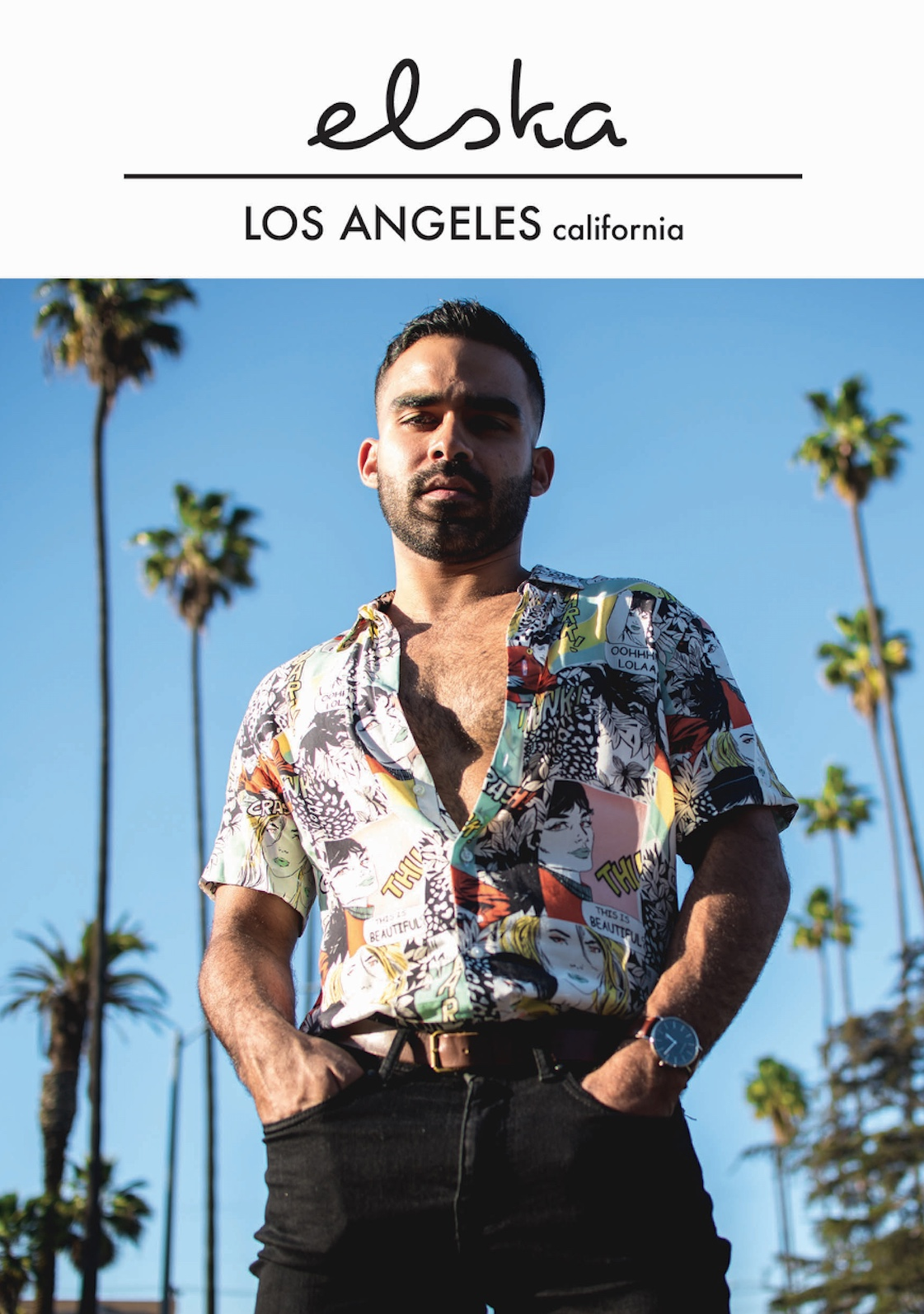
- Cover of Elska Los Angeles edition
- Editor: Liam Campbell
- Categories: Photography, LGBT culture, lifestyle
- Frequency: Bi-monthly
- First issue: September 2015
- Country: United Kingdom
- Language: English
- Website: www.elskamagazine.com

Elska is a bi-monthly magazine, dedicated to male photography and culture. The magazine is based in the United Kingdom.

== History ==
Elska was created by Liam Campbell, and its first edition was released in September, 2015. Its name means "love" in Icelandic. Liam Campbell, editor-in-chief of Elska was named as one of 100 LGBT trailblazers In February 2021 issue of Attitude magazine.

== Overview ==
Elska is published six times a year. It features photographs by its chief photographer Liam Campbell as well as guest features by established and emerging photographers. Each issue is dedicated to and shot in a different city, featuring photospreads of local men, each accompanied by stories which are mostly written by the men themselves and allow the participants to candidly open up about their lives.

Elska has been defined as "part intellectual queer pin-up mag and part sexy anthropology journal". One of the main ideas which separates Elska from other gay photography related publications is that it does not feature perfect models, but instead focuses on real people with their imperfections, presenting real life people and stories, and providing a kaleidoscope glimpse at queer men and community around the globe. It is a multicultural magazine, with issues themed on cities around the world and on all continents.

Elska has become known for its diversity, profiling people of various races, ages, and body types. It has also been described as having a message of body positivity, and was described by The Advocate as "probably the nicest, most sincere magazine to have ever been created". The magazine assumes the idea that it does not matter what shape, size, colour, or race a person has, he is beautiful. In addition to print issues, all the issues are also available in electronic magazine format.

=== Issues ===
- 1 Lviv, Ukraine
- 2 Berlin, Germany
- 3 Reykjavík, Iceland
- 4 Lisbon, Portugal
- 5 Taipei, Taiwan
- 6 Istanbul, Turkey
- 7 Cardiff, Wales, UK
- 8 Toronto, Canada
- 9 Yokohama, Japan
- 10 Mumbai, India
- 11 Providence, Rhode Island, US
- 12 Brussels, Belgium
- 13 Helsinki, Finland
- 14 Haifa, Israel
- 15 Bogotá, Colombia
- 16 Cape Town, South Africa
- 17 Perth, Australia
- 18 Los Angeles, California, US
- 19 London, England, UK
- 20 Lyon, France
- 21 Seoul, South Korea
- 22 Stockholm, Sweden
- 23 Dhaka, Bangladesh
- 24 Guadalajara, Mexico
- 25 Manila, Philippines
- 26 Pittsburgh, Pennsylvania, US
- 27 Warsaw, Poland
- 28 Amsterdam, Netherlands
- 29 Kuala Lumpur, Malaysia
- 30 Sydney, Australia
- 31 Belfast, Northern Ireland, UK
- 32 Dublin, Ireland
- 33 São Paulo, Brazil
- 34 Atlanta, Georgia, US
- 35 Casablanca, Morocco
- 36 Montréal, Québec
- 37 Bern, Switzerland
- 38 Athens, Greece
- 39 Singapore
- 40 Paris, France
- 41 San Francisco, California, US
- 42 Almaty, Kazakhstan
- 43 Bangkok, Thailand
- 44 Tbilisi, Georgia
- 45 Glasgow, Scotland
- 46 Madrid, Spain
- 47 Munich, Germany
- 48 Melbourne, Australia
- 49 Salt Lake City, Utah, US
- 50 Odesa, Ukraine
- 51 Buenos Aires, Argentina
- 52 Chișinău, Moldova
- 53 Mexico City, Mexico
- 54 Rome, Italy
- 55 Akureyri, Iceland
- 56 Pristina, Kosovo
- 57 Ho Chi Minh City, Vietnam
- 58 Regina, Saskatchewan, Canada
- 59 Krung Thep Maha Nakhon, Thailand
- 60 Chicago, Illinois, US

Reissues

- Lviv, Ukraine (with additional materials and new cover)
- Berlin, Germany (with additional materials and new cover)
- Reykjavík, Iceland (with additional materials and new cover)
- Lisbon, Portugal (with additional materials and new cover)
- Taipei, Taiwan (with additional materials and new cover)
- Istanbul, Turkey (with additional materials and new cover)
- Toronto, Canada (with additional materials and new cover)
- Yokohama, Japan (with additional materials and new cover)
- Mumbai, India (with additional materials and new cover)
- Haifa (with additional materials and new cover)
- Los Angeles, California, US (with additional materials and new cover)
- San Francisco, California, US (with additional materials and new cover)

Special editions

- 15 Icelandic Swimming Pools

== Elska Ekstra ==
The magazine also publishes the e-zine Ekstra. This publication contains hundreds of outtake images, behind the scenes tales, and other bonus features.
