= Liam McCabe =

Ecuadorian footballer (born 1999)

Personal information
- Full name: Liam Patrick McCabe Soriano
- Date of birth: 8 July 1999 (age 27)
- Place of birth: Ecuador
- Height: 1.72 m (5 ft 8 in)
- Positions: Defender; midfielder

Senior career*
Years	Team	Apps	(Gls)
2020–	Deportivo Cuenca	2	(0)
- * Club domestic league appearances and goals

Liam Patrick McCabe Soriano (born 8 July 1999) is an Ecuadorian footballer who plays as a defender or midfielder. His last club was Deportivo Cuenca and he is currently a free player.

== Career ==
=== Club career ===
McCabe started his career with Ecuadorian side Deportivo Cuenca after training with St Pat's in the Republic of Ireland. On 19 December 2020, he debuted for Deportivo Cuenca during a 1–2 loss to Guayaquil City.

=== International career ===
McCabe is eligible to represent the Republic of Ireland internationally.
