= Liam Buchanan (cricketer) =

Australian cricketer (born 1980)

Personal information
- Full name: Liam Buchanan
- Born: 22 November 1980 (age 45); Lorne, Victoria, Australia
- Batting: Right-handed
- Bowling: Right-arm fast medium
- Relatives: Amon Buchanan (brother); Meyrick Buchanan (brother)

Domestic team information
- Years: Team
- 2005/06: Victoria
- LA debut: 3 December 2005 Victoria v South Australia
- Last LA: 18 February 2006 Victoria v Tasmania
- T20 debut: 6 January 2006 Victoria v Western Australia
- Last T20: 21 January 2006 Victoria v New South Wales

Career statistics
Competition	List A	T20
Matches	9	3
Runs scored	86	86
Batting average	14.33	28.66
100s/50s	0/1	0/0
Top score	51	47
Catches/stumpings	4/0	0/0
- Source: CricketArchive, 30 December 2013

Liam Buchanan is an Australian cricketer who represented Victoria in 2005 and 2006.

He is a brother of former Melbourne Renegades cricketer Meyrick Buchanan, and former Australian rules footballer, Amon Buchanan.

== Playing career ==
In 2002 Buchanan was a member of the Australian Cricket Academy.

Buchanan played for Melbourne Cricket Club and Geelong Cricket Club in Victorian Premier Cricket.
