= Liam Lis =

American singer-songwriter (born 2001)

- Birth name: Liam Lis
- Born: October 10, 2001 (age 23); New York City, United States
- Genres: Pop
- Occupation(s): singer, songwriter
- Years active: 2007–present
- Labels: Republic Records; Lava Records
- Website: www.liamlis.com

Liam Lis is a pop singer-songwriter from New York City. He is signed to Lava / Republic Records.

== Biography ==
Liam Lis is a pop singer-songwriter from New York City. He was born on October 10, 2001, in New York City, NY. At five years old, Lis learned how to play the ukulele and drums and started to sing. His grandparents helped feed this musical passion by giving him a special birthday gift, a bongo drum.

Some of Liam's musical influences are Maroon 5, Bruno Mars, and Taylor Swift. With those influences, he started covering songs on YouTube, gaining a huge following over the years with over two million views.

Lis is currently signed to Lava / Republic Records.

== Tour ==
Liam's first tour was as support for Fifth Harmony. He's also opened for Disney's Zendaya at famed venues: Best Buy Theater in New York, Philadelphia's Keswick Theater, and New Jersey's iPlay America. While touring with Fifth Harmony, Silentó, Alessia Cara, K Camp, Lis has built a fan base, LL Crew.

Liam joined headliner Fetty Wap, Post Malone, and Monty during the 2016 Welcome to the Zoo Tour. It began February 4 at Wellmont Theatre in Montclair, NJ, played in major cities across the US and concluded March 19 at House of Blues in Myrtle Beach, SC.

== Musical career ==
In 2016, Liam Lis released a new single, "4 The Love" with GRAMMY award winner Nile Rodgers and later in the year, he will release "Number One Girl," a song featuring fellow rapper, Fetty Wap.
