= Leigh Smith =

Leigh Smith may refer to:

- Alice Leigh-Smith (1907–1987), Croatian-born nuclear physicist
- Blake Leigh-Smith (born 1990), Australian motorcycle racer
- Leigh Smith (javelin thrower) (born 1981), American athlete
- Benjamin Smith (Whig politician) (Benjamin Leigh Smith, 1783–1860)
- Barbara Bodichon (born Barbara Leigh Smith, 1827–1891), English educationalist and feminist, daughter of Benjamin Smith
- Benjamin Leigh Smith (1828–1913), British yachtsman and explorer, son of Benjamin Smith

== See also ==
- Mindy Smith (Melinda Leigh Smith, born 1972), American singer-songwriter
- Susan Smith (Susan Leigh Smith, born 1971), American woman convicted of murdering her two sons
