= Liam Graham =

Liam Graham may refer to:

- Liam Graham (cricketer) (born 1976), South African cricketer
- Liam Graham (footballer) (born 1992), New Zealand footballer
- Liam Graham (snooker player) (born 2004), Scottish snooker player
