= Liam Davies =

Liam Davies may refer to:

- Liam Davies (boxer)
- Liam Davies (snooker player)
- Liam Davies (rugby union)

== See also ==
- Liam Davis (disambiguation)
