= Liam Engström =

Swedish ice hockey player (born 2004)

- Born: September 17, 2004 (age 22) Surahammar, Sweden
- Height: 5 ft 9 in (175 cm)
- Weight: 175 lb (79 kg; 12 st 7 lb)
- Position: Right Wing
- Shoots: Left
- HockeyEttan team Former teams: Karlskrona HK; Örebro HK
- Playing career: 2022–present

Liam Engström is a Swedish ice hockey right wing currently playing for Karlskrona HK.

== Playing career ==
Engström began his junior hockey career in the Västerås IK system, spending two years with the program. Entering the truncated COVID-19 season, he moved on to Örebro HK and posted solid numbers in 2021. The following year his offensive output exploded and Engström averaged over 2 points per game in the J18 Region. Before season's end he was promoted to the U20 squad and spent mote of the following season with that team as well. During the '23 season, he spent 3 games with the parent club, going scoreless, and also spent time with the national junior team.

== Career statistics ==
=== Regular season and playoffs ===
			Regular season					Playoffs
Season	Team	League	GP	G	A	Pts	PIM	GP	G	A	Pts	PIM
2021–22	Örebro HK J20	J20 Nationell	10	3	2	5	27	—	—	—	—	—
2022–23	Örebro HK J20	J20 Nationell	47	21	11	32	12	2	0	0	0	0
2022–23	Örebro HK	SHL	3	0	0	0	0	—	—	—	—	—

=== International ===
Year	Team	Event	Result	GP	G	A	Pts	PIM
2022–23	Sweden U19	International	—	4	0	1	1	0
2022–23	Sweden U20	International	—	4	1	2	3	0
Junior totals				8	1	3	4	0
