= 1995 All-Ireland Senior Hurling Championship final =

1995 All-Ireland Senior Hurling Final
- Event: 1995 All-Ireland Senior Hurling Championship
Clare	Offaly
1-13	2-8
- Date: 3 September 1995
- Venue: Croke Park, Dublin
- Man of the Match: Seánie McMahon
- Referee: Dickie Murphy (Wexford)
- Attendance: 65,092
- Weather: Cloudy

The 1995 All-Ireland Senior Hurling Championship Final (sponsored by Guinness) was the 108th All-Ireland Final and the culmination of the 1995 All-Ireland Senior Hurling Championship, an inter-county hurling tournament for the top teams in Ireland. The match was held at Croke Park, Dublin, on 3 September 1995, between Clare and Offaly. The Leinster champions lost to their Munster opponents on a score line of 1-13 to 2-8. It was Clare's first All-Ireland title since 1914. The match was shown live in Ireland on Network 2 with match commentary by Ger Canning with analysis by Tomás Mulcahy.

== Match details ==
=== Summary ===
Offaly's Daithí Regan opened the scoring in the game with a long range point into the canal end of the stadium. Billy Dooley then got a second point for Offaly after a high ball broke to him on the right. Seánie McMahon got Clare's opening score with a long range point to make the score 0-2 to 0-1 in Offaly's favor. Ollie Baker scored from a side line ball on the right to put Clare ahead by a point. Johnny Pilkington got a goal in the second half when he pulled on a loose ball in front of goals that went low and rolled into the net past Clare goalkeeper Davy Fitzgerald. Clare's goal in the second half came when a long range free from Anthony Daly was patted back into play by Offaly goalkeeper David Hughes where it was hit high to the net from the edge of the square by Éamonn Taaffe.

3 September
Final
15:30 BST

Clare	1-13 – 2-8	Offaly
F. Tuohy (0-4), E. Taffe (1-0), S. McMahon (0-3), J. O'Connor (0-2), F. Hegarty (0-1), G. O'Loughlin (0-1), O. Baker (0-1), A. Daly (0-1).	Report	Johnny Dooley (0-5), J. Pilkington (1-0), M. Duignan (1-0), J. Troy (0-1), D. Regan (0-1), B. Dooley (0-1).

Croke Park, Dublin
Attendance: 65,092
Referee: D. Murphy (Wexford)

Clare	Offaly

CLARE GAA:
1	Davy Fitzgerald
2	Michael O'Halloran
3	Brian Lohan
4	Frank Lohan
5	Liam Doyle
6	Seánie McMahon
7	Anthony Daly (c)
8	Jamesie O'Connor
9	Ollie Baker
10	Fergus Tuohy
11	P.J. O'Connell
12	Fergal Hegarty
13	Stephen McNamara
14	Conor Clancy
15	Ger O'Loughlin
Substitutes Used:
16	Éamonn Taaffe for S. McNamara
17	Cyril Lyons for C. Clancy
18	Alan Neville for É. Taaffe
Manager:
Ger Loughnane

OFFALY GAA:
1	David Hughes
2	Shane McGuckin
3	Kevin Kinahan
4	Martin Hanamy
5	Brian Whelahan
6	Hubert Rigney
7	Kevin Martin
8	Johnny Pilkington (c)
9	Daithí Regan
10	Johnny Dooley
11	John Troy
12	Michael Duignan
13	Billy Dooley
14	Pat O'Connor
15	Joe Dooley
Substitutes Used:
16	Declan Pilkington for P. O'Connor
17	Brendan Kelly for Joe Dooley
Manager:
Éamonn Cregan

== Aftermath ==
Clare captain Anthony Daly received the Liam MacCarthy Cup from GAA President Jack Boothman in the Hogan Stand and gave a famous speech saying "'There's been a missing person in Clare for 81 long years. Well today that person has been found alive and well, and that person's name is Liam McCarthy".

The Sunday Game (which was broadcast that night) crossed over to the winners hotel in Dublin, with Ger Canning and Marty Morrissey interviewing the winning manager Ger Loughnane and some of the players.
