= Davy Fitzgerald =

Hurling manager, former Clare goalkeeper

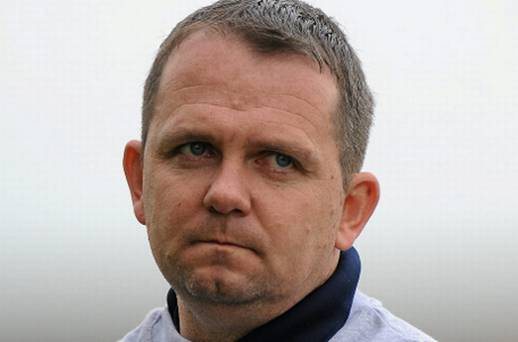

Personal information
- Native name: Daithí Mac Gearailt (Irish)
- Born: 2 August 1971 (age 55) Sixmilebridge, County Clare, Ireland

Sport
- Sport: Hurling
- Position: Goalkeeper
Club
Years	Club	Apps (scores)
1989–2011	Sixmilebridge	100 (4–9)
Club titles
- Clare titles: 6
- Munster titles: 2
- All-Ireland Titles: 1
Inter-county*
Years	County	Apps (scores)
1990–2008	Clare	60 (2–0)
Inter-county titles
- Munster titles: 3
- All-Irelands: 2
- NHL: 0
- All Stars: 3
- *Inter County team apps and scores correct as of 20:42, 27 June 2013.

David Fitzgerald (born 2 August 1971) is an Irish hurling manager and former player.

He was the manager of the Waterford county team from 2022 until 2024, having previously managed the team between 2008 and 2011. As a player, he played as a goalkeeper winning, two All-Irelands with Clare.

Fitzgerald began his hurling career at club level with Sixmilebridge. He broke onto the club's top adult team as a 17-year-old in 1989 and had his greatest success in 1996 when Sixmilebridge won the All-Ireland Club Championship. Fitzgerald's club career ended in 2011, by which time he had also won two Munster Club Championship titles and six Clare Senior Championship titles.

At inter-county level, Fitzgerald was part of a Clare minor team that won the Munster Championship in 1989, before he later lined out with the Clare under-21 team. He joined the Clare senior team in 1990. From his debut, Fitzgerald was ever-present as a goalkeeper and made a combined total of 148 National League and Championship appearances in a career that ended with his last game in 2006. During that time he was part of two All-Ireland Championship-winning teams – in 1995 and 1997. Fitzgerald also secured three Munster Championship medals. He announced his retirement from inter-county hurling on 31 March 2008.

Fitzgerald won his first All-Star in 1995, before claiming a further two All-Stars in 2002 and 2005. He is currently Clare's record championship appearer, having played in 60 championship games. At inter-provincial level, Fitzgerald was selected to play in seven championship campaigns with Munster and won Railway Cup medals in 1995, 1996, 1997 and 2005.

Even as a player, Fitzgerald became involved in team management and coaching. In 1999 Fitzgerald was part of u21 Clare coaching team. Fitzgerald received a GAA 8-week suspension, after an on the field alteration with a Tipperary hurling player, following Clare u21 munster final loss. After coaching every grade of Sixmilebridge team from juvenile to senior, he later had an unsuccessful tenure in charge of Nenagh Éire Óg. Fitzgerald subsequently became director of hurling at the Limerick Institute of Technology with whom he won two Fitzgibbon Cup titles.

Fitzgerald's first managerial role at inter-county level was with Waterford in 2008. In his four seasons in charge he guided the team to a first All-Ireland final appearance in 45 years as well as the Munster Championship title in 2010. Fitzgerald later spent five seasons as manager of the Clare senior team who he guided to the All-Ireland title in 2013 and a first National League title in 38 years. After stepping down as Clare manager he took charge of the Wexford senior team, winning the Leinster Championship in 2019.

On 26 September 2019, Fitzgerald confirmed that he would be staying on with the Wexford senior hurlers for another two seasons. He had been linked to vacant Galway hurling managerial position but said that he never spoke to anyone other than the Wexford County Board. He announced his departure from Wexford on 30 July 2021. In 2022 Davy was part of Cork caomgies back room team assisting manager Matthew Twomey. Fitzgerald was sent off by the referee in Corks opening league match of 2022 Davy began a second term as Deise manager in August 2022 until 2024. In 2025 Fitzgerald managed Antrim senior hurling team.

== Early life ==
Fitzgerald's father Pat served as secretary of the Clare County Board from June 1990. In June 2022, Pat Fitzgerald announced his intention to resign from the role after 32 years.

== Playing career ==
=== Club ===
Fitzgerald played his club hurling with his local team in Sixmilebridge and enjoyed much success in a career that spanned four decades and 100 senior championship games.

After making his debut as a substitute in Sixmilebridge's opening championship game in 1989, Fitzgerald subsequently took over from Brendan Flynn as first-choice goalkeeper. It was a successful debut season as he captured his first county championship medal following a 3–14 to 1–11 defeat of Clarecastle.

In 1992 Sixmilebridge were back in the championship decider. A narrow 1–11 to 1–10 defeat of Éire Óg gave victory to "the Bridge" and gave Fitzgerald a second county championship medal.

For only the second time in the history of the club, Sixmilebridge retained their championship title in 1993 following a 3–8 to 2–6 defeat of O'Callaghan's Mills. It was Fitzgerald's third county championship medal.

Three-in-a-row proved beyond Sixmilebridge, however, the team bounced back to reach the championship decider again in 1995. Scariff provided the opposition on that occasion, however, Sixmilebridge secured the victory by just a single point on a score line of 2–10 to 0–15. The win gave Fitzgerald a fourth county championship medal. "The Bridge" later qualified for the provincial decider against Tipp champions Nenagh Éire Óg. A converted penalty by Fitzgerald helped the team to a 2–18 to 1–7 victory and the Munster title. Sixmilebridge later qualified for the All-Ireland final where Dunloy were the opponents. The Ulstermen provided little opposition as the Clare champions surged to a 5–10 to 2–6 victory. It was Fitzgerald's first All-Ireland medal.

After losing the championship decider in 1999, Sixmilebridge bounced back the following year to reach the county showpiece once again. Éire Óg were the opponents, however, Fitzgerald won a fifth championship medal following a 4–9 to 1–8 defeat of Éire Óg. He later added a second Munster medal to his collection following a 2–17 to 3–8 defeat of Mount Sion in the provincial final.

After surrendering their title in 2001, Sixmilebridge returned to the county final the following year. Clarecastle provided the opposition, however, a 3–10 to 2–8 victory gave Fitzgerald his sixth championship medal. This win also proved to be his last major victory with the club.

Fitzgerald continued with Sixmilebridge until he decided to retire after the 2008 championship. He came out of retirement in 2011 to make his 100th appearance and help the club to qualify for the county final once again.

=== Clare ===
==== Minor and under-21 ====
Fitzgerald first played for Clare as a member of the minor team during the 1989 Munster Championship. He made his first appearance for the team on 19 April 1989 when he lined out in goal in a 7–08 to 0–07 defeat of Cork. On 2 July 1989, Fitzgerald won a Munster Championship medal after Clare's 2–13 to 2–12 defeat of Limerick in the final. On 3 September 1989, he again lined out in goal when Clare suffered a 2–16 to 1–12 defeat by Offaly in the All-Ireland final.

Fitzgerald was drafted onto the Clare under-21 team in advance of the 1990 Munster Championship. He made his debut in the grade on 20 June 1990 when he lined out in goal in a 2–11 to 2–05 defeat of Cork.

On 15 July 1992, Fitzgerald lined out in goal when Clare faced Waterford in the Munster final. He ended the game on the losing side after a 0–17 to 1–12 defeat. It was Fitzgerald's last game n the grade.

==== Senior ====
Fitzgerald was just out of the minor grade when he was added to the Clare senior team during the 1989-90 National League. He made his first appearance for the team on 19 February 1990 when he lined out in goal in Clare's 4–10 to 1–11 defeat of Down. After impressing in goal over the remainder of the league and finishing top of Division 2, Fitzgerald became first-choice goalkeeper for the 1990 Munster Championship. He made his debut on 13 May 1990 in a 2–16 to 1–05 defeat by Limerick.

On 4 July 1993, Fitzgerald lined out in goal when Clare qualified for their first Munster final appearance since 1986. Fitzgerald ended the game on the losing side following the 3–27 to 2–12 defeat by Tipperary.

After winning a second National League Division 2 title, Fitzgerald lined out in a second successive Munster final on 10 July 1994. He ended on the losing side after suffering 0–25 to 2–10 defeat by Limerick.

On 7 May 1995, Fitzgerald lined out in his first National League final. He conceded two goals in the 2–12 to 0–09 defeat by Kilkenny. Fitzgerald lined out in a third successive Munster final on 9 July 1995 with Limerick providing the opposition for the second year in-a-row. One of the most enduring moments in the decade was of Fitzgerald scampering back the length of Semple Stadium’s pitch after scoring a first-half penalty. He ended the game with a winners' medal following the 1–17 to 0–11 victory. On 3 September 1995, Fitzgerald lined out in goal when Clare qualified for the All-Ireland final for the first time since 1932. He conceded two goals but ended the game with an All-Ireland medal following a 1–13 to 2–08 victory. Fitzgerald ended the season by being named in the goalkeeping position on the All-Star team.

Fitzgerald lined out in the fourth Munster final of his career on 6 July 1997. He ended the game with a second winners' medal after the 1–18 to 0–18 defeat of Tipperary. On 14 September 1997, Fitzgerald was once again in goal when Clare renewed their rivalry with Tipperary in the All-Ireland final. He conceded two goals but collected a second All-Ireland medal following the 0–20 to 2–13 victory.

On 12 July 1998, Fitzgerald lined out in goal when Clare drew 1–16 to 3–10 with Waterford in the Munster final. He retained his position for the replay a week later and made an important save from a Paul Flynn free in the 60th minute. Fitzgerald ended the game with a third winners' medal in four years after the 2–16 to 0–10 victory.

After a number of disappointing championship seasons, Clare surprised the hurling world by qualifying for the All-Ireland final again in 2002. Fitzgerald's side put up a good fight against Kilkenny, however, a combined tally of 2–13 for both Henry Shefflin and D. J. Carey gave 'the Cats' a seven-point victory.

After a number of disappointing seasons and some near misses, Clare bounced back in 2005. In spite of an early exit from the provincial campaign Fitzgerald's side subsequently qualified for an All-Ireland semi-final meeting with Cork. In that game Clare had the reigning All-Ireland champions on the ropes. Clare led by six points at one stage, however, Cork fought back to defeat Clare by just one point.

In 2006 Clare were comprehensively defeated by Cork in their opening game in the championship. After topping group B of the qualifier series for the second consecutive year Clare subsequently defeated Wexford to set up an All-Ireland semi-final meeting with Kilkenny. Clare, however, were defeated once again.

In early 2007 speculation was rife that Fitzgerald was on the cusp of retiring due to his unhappiness with certain aspects of the county set-up and a difference of opinion with new manager Tony Considine. He was later omitted from Clare's National League panel in spite of a crisis meeting between Fitzgerald and Considine. As a result of the disagreement between the two men, Fitzgerald also remained sidelined for the championship campaign. At the end of the year Fitzgerald contemplated a return to inter-county hurling once again. In early 2008 he returned to the Clare senior hurling team under new manager Mike McNamara. He played a challenge match against Kilkenny, however, a serious finger injury hampered his style of play. After this unsuccessful return he eventually decided to retire from inter-county hurling on 31 March 2008.

=== Inter-provincial ===
Fitzgerald also lined out with Munster in the inter-provincial hurling championship where he played alongside his championship rivals from other Munster hurling counties. He first played for his province in 1993 as Munster were surprisingly defeated by Ulster in the semi-final.

By 1996 Fitzgerald was the first-choice 'keeper on the Munster team. A 2–20 to 0–10 defeat of Leinster gave him his first Railway Cup medal on the field of play. He added a second successive Railway Cup medal to his collection in 1997 following another defeat of Leinster.

After an absence of a number of years, Fitzgerald was recalled to the Munster team in 2005. A 1–21 to 2–14 defeat of Leinster gave him his third Railway Cup winners' medal.

=== Poc Fada ===
Fitzgerald has also enjoyed success in the famous Poc Fada competition held annually in the Cooley Mountains Winning the men's senior event in 1999 and 2002. Fitzgerald has also been a winner in the pairs competition on 5 occasions winning in 1993 with Michael Shaughnessy of Galway, in 1998 with Seamus McMullan of Antrim, in 2002 with Graham Clarke of Down, in 2005 with Damien Fitzhenry of Wexford and in 2007 with Albert Shanahan of Limerick.

== Managerial career ==
Davy Fitzgerald
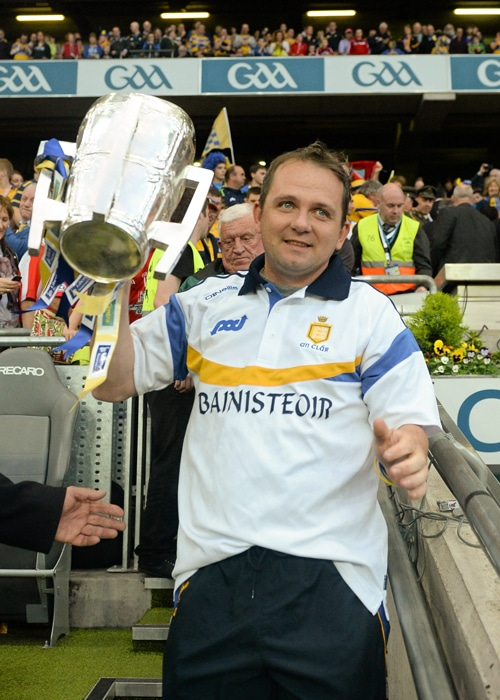

Sport
Club management
- Years: Club
- 2005 - 2008 2008: Sixmilebridge; Nenagh Éire Óg
Inter-county management
- Years: Team
- 2008–2011 2011–2016 2016–2021 2022–2024 2025-: Waterford; Clare; Wexford; Waterford Antrim
Inter-county titles as manager
County	League	Province	All-Ireland
Waterford Clare Wexford Antrim	0; 1; 0; 0	1; 0; 1; 0	0; 1; 0; 0

=== Limerick Institute of Technology ===
Fitzgerald was manager of the Limerick Institute of Technology hurling team.

In March 2004, Fitzgerald was hit with an eight week ban, for branding referee Pat Horan a "disgrace" during LIT college semi-final defeat to UCC in Fitzgibbon Cup.

In 2005 Fitzgerald's side won the final of the Fitzgibbon Cup, defeating near rivals University of Limerick in the process.

Two years later the Limerick Institute of Technology team was back in the Fitzgibbon decider once again. A 2–15 to 0–13 defeat of the National University of Ireland, Galway gave them the title and gave Fitzgerald a second Fitzgibbon Cup as manager.

=== Sixmilebridge ===
Even during his playing days Fitzgerald became heavily involved in coaching and managing teams. Since the early 1990s he has coached virtually every team from juvenile to senior with his own native Sixmilebridge club. In 2005 he was appointed manager of the club's senior hurling team. His tenure was an unsuccessful one as a number of new clubs emerged to shake up the championship.

=== Nenagh Éire Óg ===
In 2008 Fitzgerald took over as manager of the Nenagh Éire Óg club team in Tipperary. After two successive losses to Borris-Ileigh and Toomevara in the North Tipperary championship, his tenure was in doubt, however, he eventually walked away due to his commitments as an inter-county manager.

=== Waterford manager ===
Following Justin McCarthy's resignation as manager of the Waterford senior hurling team following a defeat by Clare, Fitzgerald was ratified as his successor for the duration of the 2008 championship. Waterford defeated Antrim, Offaly, Wexford. Waterford team having recently lost the previous semi finals 2002, 2004, 2006 & 2007. Davy guided waterford to victory over Tipperary saw Waterford reach the 2008 All-Ireland final for the first time in forty-five years. Kilkenny provided the opposition and went on to trounce Waterford by 3–30 to 1–13 to claim a third All-Ireland title in-a-row.

After a disappointing National League campaign in 2009, Waterford still qualified for the All-Ireland semi-final against Kilkenny. Despite a far better performance than the previous encounter, Waterford lost 2–23 to 3–15.

In 2010 Fitzgerald guided Waterford back to the Munster final for a second consecutive year. Cork provided the opposition, however, a 2–15 apiece draw was the result. The subsequent replay saw Waterford win the provincial title by 1–16 to 1–13.

Fitzgerald's final season in charge featured some high points as well as a lot of negative criticism. Fitzgerald was handed a four-week suspension by Central Hearing Committee for "abusive language towards a referee" in wake of Waterford NHL game against Tipperary in Semple Stadium.

After a 7–19 to 0–19 trouncing at the hands of Tipperary in the 2011 Munster final, Waterford still reached a fourth successive All-Ireland semi-final. Kilkenny once again put a halt to Waterford's All-Ireland hopes with a six-point defeat.

Following this defeat Fitzgerald informed the Waterford county board that he would not be seeking another term as manager of the senior hurling team bringing an end to his four years in charge.

=== Clare manager ===
On 11 October 2011, Fitzgerald was confirmed as the Clare senior hurling manager on a three-year term. With renowned hurling coach Paul Kinnerk a part of the backroom team, Clare had strong underage players, winning the U21 All-Ireland in 2009 and the Munster Minor championships in 2010 and 2011.

Fitzgerald's first season in charge saw Clare gain promotion from Division 1B following a defeat of Limerick in the final.

On 18 August 2013, Clare got to the All-Ireland Senior Hurling Championship Final after a 1–22 to 0–18 win against Limerick at Croke Park. On 28 September Fitzgerald managed Clare to win the All Ireland senior title, beating Cork 5–16 to 3–16 in a replay. In October 2013, Fitzgerald was handed a further three-year extension in charge of the Clare team which will bring him up to the end of 2016. Clare failed to defend their All-Ireland title in 2014, eventually losing to Wexford by 2–25 to 2–22 in a round 1 qualifier replay in Wexford.

In March 2015, Clare were relegated from Division 1A of the National Hurling League after a 1–17 to 1–18 defeat to Kilkenny. On 11 July 2015, Clare lost to Cork on a 0–17 to 0–20 scoreline to exit the 2015 All-Ireland Senior Hurling Championship after previously losing to Limerick and beating Offaly during the championship. It was confirmed on 14 July 2015 that Fitzgerald would remain as manager for the next two years of his term. On 8 May 2016, Clare won the 2016 National Hurling League, their first National Hurling League title since 1978 after a 1–23 to 2–19 win against Waterford in a replay.

Clare were knocked out of the 2016 Championship by Galway in the quarter-finals on 24 July, losing by six points. On 21 September 2016, Fitzgerald stepped down as Clare Senior Hurling manager, informing the Clare County Board that he would not be seeking reappointment for 2017. In a statement issued by Clare Hurlers, Fitzgerald said, "One of the greatest privileges of my life has been to manage the Clare Senior Hurling team and I am immensely proud of the success achieved during my time at the helm, in light of the ensuing meeting and the divided opinions expressed by the players, I have decided that it would be in the best interests of Clare hurling that I step down from the role of manager.”

=== Wexford manager ===
On 7 October 2016, Fitzgerald was appointed as manager of the Wexford senior hurling team for a three-year term.

Wexford had good underage hurling players coming through, Wexford having won 3 Leinster U21 titles in a row between 2013-2015.

On 19 February, Wexford defeated Galway by 1–21 to 3–13 in the 2017 National Hurling League at Pearse Stadium to record their second win out of two games. On 12 March 2017, Wexford achieved promotion to Division 1A of the National Hurling League with a game to spare after a 1–17 to 0–15 win against Offaly. On 2 April 2017, Wexford defeated Kilkenny by 2–18 to 0–19 at Nowlan Park in the quarter-finals of the National Hurling league, it was only the third victory from the last 21 meetings with Kilkenny.

On 16 April 2017, during the league semi-final defeat against Tipperary, Fitzgerald entered the field to challenge referee Diarmuid Kirwan thinking that it should have been a free to Wexford before the second Tipperary goal. He confronted Tipperary's Niall O’Meara and shoved Jason Forde before leaving the field of play. Four days later Fitzgerald was handed an eight-week suspension by the GAA's Central Competitions Control Committee. On 10 June 2017, Wexford defeated Kilkenny by 1–20 to 3–11 in the 2017 Leinster Championship semi-final to qualify for their first Leinster final in nine years. It was also their first summer win against Kilkenny in thirteen years. In 2018, Wexford recorded wins over Waterford, Clare and Cork in Division 1A of the National Hurling League, staying up with a game to spare. They bet Galway in the league quarter final and lost to Kilkenny in the semi-final, who went on to win the competition. In the Leinster championship, they beat Dublin by 2 points in the second round, having had a bye in the first round. They then annihilated Offaly on a scoreline of 5–24 to 2-9, but lost to Galway by 9 points in Wexford Park the week after. It all came down to Nowlan park the following week against Kilkenny. The winners of this game would determine who would join Galway in the Leinster final. Wexford put on a great first half display and were winning by 9 points at one stage, but faded and lost by a single point. This led Wexford to a preliminary quarter final against Westmeath, the Joe Mcdonagh cup losers. Having won this game, a date with Clare was set up in Páirc Ui Chaoimh in the All Ireland quarter final. They lost this game on a scoreline of 1–17 to 0-28, with Fitzgerald's future with Wexford being undetermined. Weeks later, the Wexford players took the bus to Clare and travelled to his house and managed to convince him to stay. Wexford Weekly reported that the possibility of him managing the u20 team also was not unlikely. At the Hurling For Cancer game in Newbridge, he stated that he aims to take Wexford to "another level" in 2019. On 2 July 2017, Wexford lost to Galway in the Leinster Final by 1–17 to 0-29 and went on to play Waterford in the All-Ireland quarter-finals on 23 July 2017. In the quarter-final, Wexford lost by 1–19 to 1-23.

In June 2019, Fitzgerald guided Wexford to the Leinster Senior Hurling Championship Final after drawing with Dublin, Galway and Kilkenny whilst beating Carlow in round 4. Wexford advanced to the final on scoring difference after a dramatic round 5 draw with Kilkenny left four teams; Kilkenny, Wexford, Dublin and Galway level on 5 points. On 30 June 2019, Wexford won their first Leinster Senior Hurling title since 2004 after an impressive 1–23 to 0–23 win over Kilkenny. It was Wexford's first win over Kilkenny in eight attempts and was played in front of a crowd of 51,842 in Croke Park.

On 8 June 2021, Fitzgerald was handed a two-match sideline ban after he was sent to the stand in League Division 1 draw with Antrim in Belfast. After getting into a war of words with Antrim boss Darren Gleeson on the sidelines

On 30 July 2021, Fitzgerald stepped down as Wexford manager after five years in charge.

Under Fitzgerald, Wexford won one knockout match in GAA Hurling All-Ireland Senior Championship in 5 years, against Westmeath in 2018.

=== Waterford manager ===
On 11 August 2022, Fitzgerald was appointed Waterford Senior hurling manager for a second time on a two-year term with an option for a third term.

Under Fitzgerald, Waterford failed to get out of the Munster Championship in 2023 and 2024.

Waterford got relegated from 2024 Division 1 Hurling League.

In June 2024, Fitzgerald was suspended for four weeks "abusive language towards a match official or disruptive conduct" after his conduct after approaching referee after Waterford MHC defeat against Clare in Cusack Park.

After an unsuccessful, 2 years in charge, Fitzgerald stepped down as manager on 2 July 2024.

=== Antrim manager ===
On 12 August 2024, Fitzgerald was appointed Antrim Senior hurling manager on a two-year term with an option for a third year.

On 25 May 2025, Antrim where relegated from the Leinster Championship, after losing all five matches.

On May 30 2025, Fitzgerald was handed an eight-week suspension for comments he made in the wake of side's Leinster SHC defeat to Galway.

In the 2026 National Hurling League Division 1B, Antrim avoided relegation by virtue of scoring difference. Following loss to Down, Fitzgeralds team fifth defeat in six league matches.

In May 2026, Fitzgerald stepped down as manager after disappointing two years in charge.

== Personal life ==
Fitzgerald was married to Ciara Flynn and they have a son, Colm. In 2019 he married Sharon O'Loughlin with whom he has a son, born in 2022.

== Career statistics ==
=== Player ===
Team	Year	National League			Munster		All-Ireland		Total	
Team	Year	Division	Apps	Score	Apps	Score	Apps	Score	Apps	Score
Clare	1989-90	Division 2	3	0-00	1	0-00	—		4	0-00
Clare	1990-91	Division 1	7	0-00	1	0-00	—		8	0-00
Clare	1991-92	Division 1B	4	0-00	2	0-00	—		6	0-00
Clare	1992-93	Division 1B	5	0-00	3	0-00	—		8	0-00
Clare	1993-94	Division 2	8	0-00	3	0-00	—		11	0-00
Clare	1994-95	Division 1	9	0-00	2	1-00	2	0-00	13	1-00
Clare	1995-96	Division 1	5	0-01	1	0-00	—		6	0-01
Clare	1997	Division 1	4	0-01	3	0-00	2	0-00	9	0-01
Clare	1998	Division 1A	6	0-01	3	0-00	3	0-00	12	0-01
Clare	1999	Division 1A	5	0-00	3	1-00	3	0-00	11	1-00
Clare	2000	Division 1A	3	0-00	1	0-00	—		4	0-00
Clare	2001	Division 1A	4	0-00	1	0-00	—		5	0-00
Clare	2002	Division 1A	6	0-00	1	0-00	5	0-00	12	0-00
Clare	2003	Division 1A	5	0-00	2	0-00	1	0-00	8	0-00
Clare	2004	Division 1A	2	0-00	1	0-00	4	0-00	7	0-00
Clare	2005	Division 1A	7	0-00	1	0-00	5	0-00	13	0-00
Clare	2006	Division 1A	5	0-00	1	0-00	5	0-00	11	0-00
Clare	2007	Division 1A	—		—		—		—	
Clare	2008	Division 1B	—		—		—		—	
Total			88	0-03	30	2-00	30	0-00	148	2-03

=== Manager ===
As of match played 25 Apr 2026.

Managerial league-championship record by team and tenure
Team	From	To	Record				
Team	From	To	P	W	D	L	Win %
Waterford	11 June 2008	6 September 2011	39	20	5	14	51.3
Clare	11 October 2011	21 September 2016	55	31	4	20	56.4
Wexford	7 October 2016	30 July 2021	36	20	3	13	55.6
Waterford	11 August 2022	3 July 2024	18	5	2	11	27.8
Antrim	12 August 2024	25 April 2026	19	3	1	15	15.8

== Honours ==
=== Playing honours ===
Sixmilebridge

- All-Ireland Senior Club Hurling Championship (1): 1996
- Munster Senior Club Hurling Championship (2): 1995, 2000
- Clare Senior Hurling Championship (6): 1989, 1992, 1993, 1995, 2000, 2002

Clare

- All-Ireland Senior Hurling Championship (2): 1995, 1997
- Munster Senior Hurling Championship (3) 1995, 1997, 1998
- National Hurling League (Division 2) (1): 1989–90
- Munster Minor Hurling Championship (1) 1989

Munster

- Railway Cup (3): 1996, 1997, 2005

=== Managerial honours ===
Limerick Institute of Technology

- Fitzgibbon Cup (2): 2005, 2007

Waterford

- Munster Senior Hurling Championship (1): 2010

Clare

- All-Ireland Senior Hurling Championship (1): 2013
- National Hurling League Division 1 (1): 2016
- National Hurling League Division 1B (1): 2012
- Munster Senior Hurling League (1): 2016
- Waterford Crystal Cup (1): 2013

Wexford

- Walsh Cup (1): 2018
- Leinster Senior Hurling Championship (1): 2019

=== Awards and achievements ===
- All-Stars (3): 1995, 2002, 2005
- RTÉ Sports Manager of the Year (1): 2013

Sporting positions
Preceded by Justin McCarthy	Waterford Senior Hurling Manager; 2008–2011	Succeeded by Michael Ryan
Preceded by Ger O'Loughlin	Clare Senior Hurling Manager; 2011–2016	Succeeded by Donal Moloney; Gerry O'Connor
Preceded by Liam Dunne	Wexford Senior Hurling Manager; 2016–2021	Succeeded by Darragh Egan
Preceded by Liam Cahill	Waterford Senior Hurling Manager; 2022–	Succeeded by Incumbent
Achievements
Preceded by Richie Bennis	All-Ireland SHC runner-up manager 2008	Succeeded by Liam Sheedy
Preceded by Brian Cody	All-Ireland SHC winning manager 2013	Succeeded by Brian Cody
