= Brian Lohan =

Irish hurler and manager

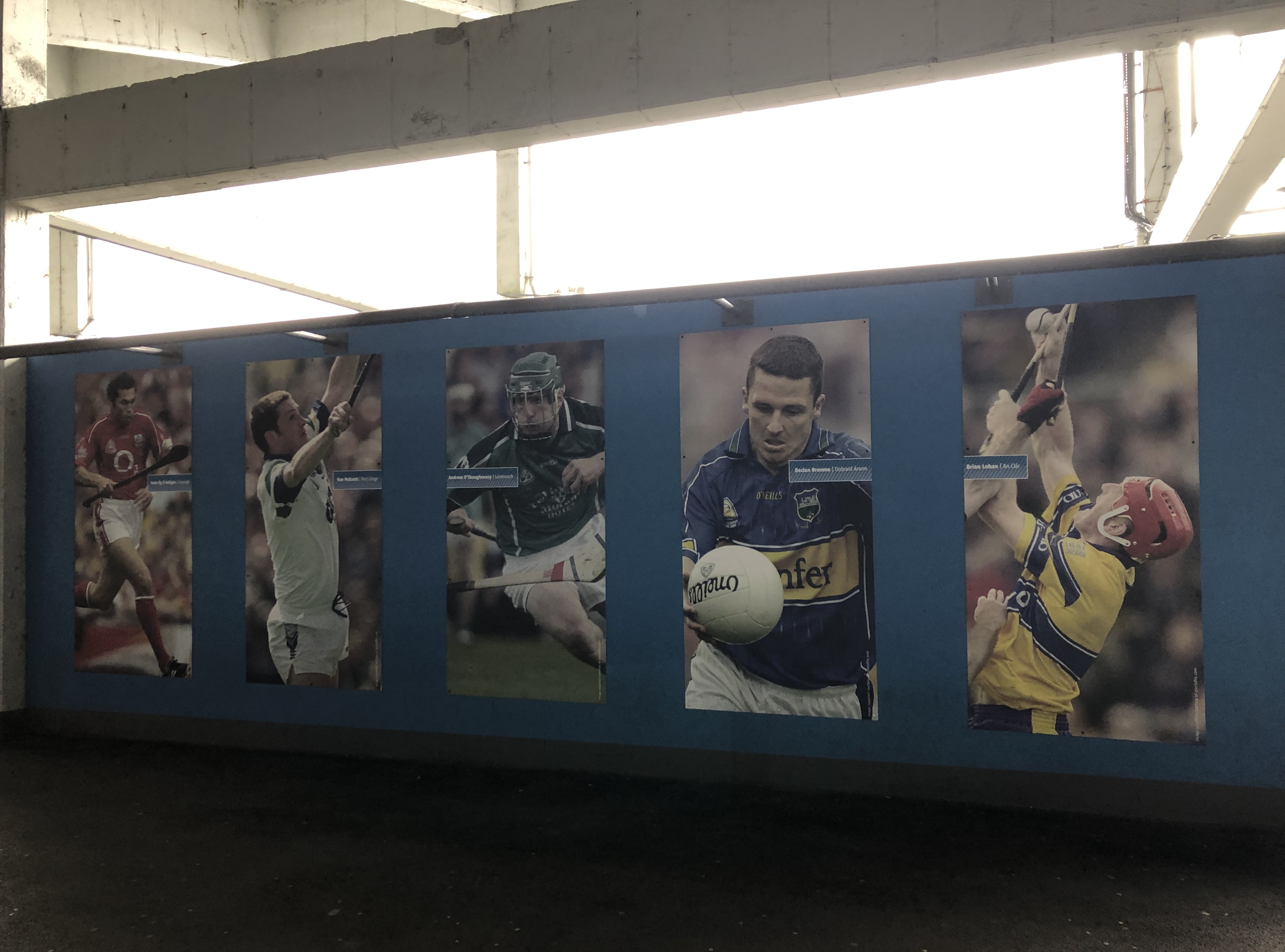

Personal information
- Native name: Brían Ó Leocháin (Irish)
- Born: 14 November 1971 (age 54) Shannon, County Clare, Ireland
- Occupation: Director of Hurling at UL
- Height: 1.85 m (6 ft 1 in)

Sport
- Sport: Hurling
- Position: Full-back
Club
- Years: Club
- Wolfe Tones na Sionna
Club titles
- Clare titles: 2
- Munster titles: 1
- All-Ireland Titles: 0
College
- Years: College
- University of Limerick
College titles
- Fitzgibbon titles: 1
Inter-county
Years	County	Apps (scores)
1993–2006	Clare	54 (0–0)
Inter-county titles
- Munster titles: 3
- All-Irelands: 2
- NHL: 0
- All Stars: 4

Brian Lohan (born 14 November 1971) is an Irish hurling manager and former player who is the manager of the Clare senior hurling team. As a player, he is widely considered to be one of the greatest full-backs of all time.

Born and raised in Shannon, County Clare, Lohan began his hurling career at club level with Wolfe Tones. After much success at underage levels, he eventually broke onto the club's senior team and had his greatest success in 1996 when he captained the team to the Munster Senior Club Hurling Championship (SHC). Lohan also won two Clare Club Championship titles during his career.

Lohan lined out for Clare in two different grades of hurling over a 14-year period. After making his first appearance for the under-21 team in May 1992, he made his competitive debut for the senior team aged 21 in 1993. During a golden age for the team, Lohan won All-Ireland Senior Hurling Championship (SHC) medals in 1995 and 1997, as well as three Munster Senior Hurling Championship (SHC) medals in a four-year period.

At inter-provincial level, Lohan was selected to play in four championship campaigns with Munster. He never lost a game for his province and ended his career with four Railway Cup medals, including as captain in 1996.

Lohan is one of only five Clare players to have made more than 50 championship appearances. During his career, he collected four All-Stars and was named Hurler of the Year. In September 2000, was selected in the full-back position on the Munster Hurling Team of the Millennium.

After retiring, Lohan began his coaching career at club level with Wolfe Tones and Patrickwell, before guiding the University of Limerick to the Fitzgibbon Cup title in 2015. He was appointed Clare manager in October 2019.

== Playing career ==
=== University of Limerick ===
During his studies at the University of Limerick (UL), Lohan lined out with the senior hurling team. In 1994 he captained the UL team to the Fitzgibbon Cup as UL defeated Waterford Regional Technical College by 2–12 to 1–11 in the final. In doing so he was also named player of the tournament. In 2012 Lohan was shortlisted for the Fitzgibbon Cup Team of the Century.

=== Wolfe Tones ===
Lohan joined the Wolfe Tones club at a young age and enjoyed some championship success at juvenile and underage levels before eventually joining the club's top adult team at senior level.

On 6 October 1996, Lohan captained Wolfe Tones to their first ever appearance in a Clare Senior Championship final. Lining out at full-back against Clarecastle, he ended the game with a winners' medal following the 1–11 to 1–8 victory. Lohan again captained the team from full-back when Wolfe Tones faced Ballygunner in the Munster Club SHC final. Described as "the dominant figure in the first half", he ended the game with a winners' medal after the 4–9 to 4–8 victory. On 17 March 1997, Wolfe Tones faced Athenry in the All-Ireland Club SHC final; however, Lohan ended the game on the losing side following a 0–14 to 1–8 defeat.

On 23 October 2005, Lohan lined out at full-back when Wolfe Tones faced Clarecastle in the Clare Senior Championship final. He was switched to the forwards for the final stage of the game which Wolfe Tones lost by 0–9 to 0–7.

Lohan lined out in his third Clare Senior Championship final on 22 October 2006. Playing at full-back he collected a second winners' medal following the 2–11 to 0–13 defeat of Newmarket-on-Fergus.

=== Clare ===
==== Under-21 ====
Lohan first played for Clare as a member of the under-21 team during the 1992 Munster U21HC. He made his first appearance for the team on 8 May 1992 when he lined out at full-back in a 0–20 to 1–3 defeat of Limerick. On 15 July 1992, Lohan was again at full-back when Clare suffered a 0–17 to 1–12 defeat by Waterford in the Munster U21HC final. It was Fitzgerald's last game in the grade.

==== Senior ====
Lohan was added to the Clare senior team during the 1992–93 National League. He made his first appearance for the team on 7 March 1993 when he lined out at right corner-back in Clare's 1–9 to 1–6 defeat by Galway. Lohan made his Munster SHC debut on 23 May 1993 when he again lined out at right corner-back for Clare in a 3–16 to 3–12 defeat of Limerick. On 4 July 1993, he lined out in his first Munster SHC final, however, Clare suffered a 3–27 to 2–12 defeat by Tipperary.

Lohan experienced his first success with Clare when the team secured the National League Division 2 title on 20 March 1994. He later lined out in a second successive Munster SHC final on 10 July 1994; however, Clare again ended on the losing side following a 0–25 to 2–10 defeat by Limerick.

On 7 May 1995, Lohan lined out in his first National League final. He ended on the losing side after a 2–12 to 0–9 defeat by Kilkenny. Lohan lined out in a third successive Munster SHC final on 9 July 1995, with Limerick providing the opposition for the second year in-a-row. He ended the game with a winners' medal following the 1–17 to 0–11 victory. On 3 September 1995, Lohane lined out at full-back when Clare qualified for the All-Ireland SHC final for the first time since 1932. He claimed an All-Ireland SHC medal following a 1–13 to 2–8 victory. Fitzgerald ended the season by being named in the full-back position on the All-Star team, while he was also named Hurler of the Year.

Lohan won a second successive All-Star in the full-back position at the end of the 1996 season.

Lohan lined out in the fourth Munster SHC final of his career on 6 July 1997. He ended the game with a second winners' medal after the 1–18 to 0–18 defeat of Tipperary. On 14 September 1997, Lohan was once again at full-back when Clare renewed their rivalry with Tipperary in the All-Ireland SHC final. He collected a second All-Ireland SHC medal following the 0–20 to 2–13 victory. Lohan ended the season with a third successive All-Star award at full-back.

On 12 July 1998, Lohan lined out at full-back when Clare drew 1–16 to 3–10 with Waterford in the Munster SHC final. He retained his position for the replay a week later, but was sent off after just a few minutes. In spite of this, Lohan ended the game with a third winners' medal in four years after the 2–16 to 0–10 victory. He subsequently received a one-month suspension.

On 4 July 1999, Lohan was at full-back when Clare qualified for a sixth Munster SHC final in seven seasons. He ended the game on the losing side following a 1–15 to 0–14 defeat by Cork.

Lohan was appointed captain of the team at the start of the 2000 season, a role he held for three seasons. On 8 September 2002, he captained the team from full-back when Clare qualified to play Kilkenny in the All-Ireland SHC final. He ended the game on the losing side following a 2–20 to 0–19 defeat. Lohan completed his season by winning a fourth All-Star award at full-back.

On 12 September 2006, Lohan announced his retirement from inter-county hurling. His final championship game had been the 2006 All-Ireland SHC semi-final loss to Kilkenny on 13 August.

=== Munster ===
Lohan also lined out with Munster in the inter-provincial series of games and enjoyed much success.

After being an unused substitute in Munster's successful 1995 campaign, Lohan made it on to the starting fifteen in 1996. A 2–20 to 0–10 trouncing of Leinster gave him his first Railway Cup medal on the field of play.

Munster made it three-in-a-row in 1997, with Lohan winning a second Railway Cup medal following another defeat of Leinster.

After leaving the team for two seasons, Lohan returned to the fill-back position in 2000. A narrow 3–15 to 2–15 defeat of Leinster gave him his third Railway Cup medal.

== Managerial career ==
=== Patrickswell ===
In retirement from playing Lohan has become involved in team management and coaching. After working with various juvenile teams in his own Wolfe Tones club, he joined Gary Kirby's Patrickswell management team in 2010. Just over a year later he took over as manager of the club's senior team.

=== University of Limerick ===
In 2012 Lohan took charge of the University of Limerick hurling team and won the Fitzgibbon Cup competition in 2015.

=== Clare ===
On 31 October 2019, Lohan was ratified as manager of the Clare senior hurling team. His first game as manager was on 15 December 2019, where Clare defeated Tipperary by one point in the opening group game of the 2020 Munster Senior Hurling League.

On 9 May 2021, Antrim defeated Clare by 1–21 to 0–22 in the opening round of the 2021 National Hurling League.

On 21 July 2024, Clare won the All-Ireland SHC final against Cork by 3–29 to 1–34 after extra-time, claiming a fifth All-Ireland SHC title and a first in 11 years.

Having been appointed as Clare manager on a two-year term (with an optional third year) in October 2019, Lohan's term was extended in 2023, and then extended by a further three years in July 2025.

== Honours ==
=== Team ===
Wolfe Tones

- Munster Senior Club Hurling Championship (1): 1996
- Clare Senior Club Hurling Championship (2): 1996, 2006

Clare

- All-Ireland Senior Hurling Championship (2): 1995, 1997
- Munster Senior Hurling Championship (3): 1995, 1997, 1998

Munster

- Railway Cup (3): 1996, 1997, 2000

University of Limerick

- Fitzgibbon Cup (1): 1994 (c)

=== Individual ===
- All-Stars (4): 1995, 1996, 1997, 2002
- All Stars Hurler of the Year (1): 1995
- Munster – Hurling Team of the Millennium (2000)
- Munster Hurling Team of the Last 25 Years (1984–2009)
- In May 2020, a public poll conducted by RTÉ.ie named Lohan in the full-back line alongside Brian Corcoran and Diarmuid O'Sullivan in a team of hurlers who had won All Stars during the era of The Sunday Game.
- Also in May 2020, the Irish Independent named Lohan at number fourteen in its "Top 20 hurlers in Ireland over the past 50 years".

=== Manager ===
University of Limerick

- Fitzgibbon Cup (1): 2015

Clare

- All-Ireland Senior Hurling Championship (1): 2024
- National Hurling League (1): 2024

Awards
Preceded by Newly created award	All-Stars Hurler of the Year; 1995	Succeeded by Larry O'Gorman
Sporting positions
Preceded by Anthony Daly	Clare Senior Hurling Team Captain; 2000–2002	Succeeded by Seánie McMahon
Preceded by Gerry O'Connor; Donal Moloney	Clare Senior Hurling Team Manager; 2019–	Succeeded by Incumbent
