= Anthony Daly (hurler) =

Irish hurler (born 1969)

Personal information
- Nickname: Dalo
- Born: 22 October 1969 (age 57) Clarecastle, County Clare, Ireland
- Occupation: Publican
- Height: 6 ft 0 in (183 cm)

Sport
- Sport: Hurling
- Position: Left wing-back
Club
- Years: Club
- 1987–2003: Clarecastle
Club titles
- Clare titles: 5
- Munster titles: 1
Inter-county*
| Years | County | Apps (scores) |
| 1989–2002 | Clare | 33 (0–9) |
Inter-county titles
- Munster titles: 3
- All-Irelands: 2
- NHL: 2 (Div 2)
- All Stars: 3
- *Inter County team apps and scores correct as of 19:19, 2 September 2014.

Anthony Daly (born 22 October 1969) is an Irish former hurler who played as a left wing-back for the Clare senior hurling team.

Born in Clarecastle, County Clare, Daly first played competitive hurling during his schooling at St. Flannan's College. He arrived on the inter-county scene when he first linked up with the Clare minor team before later joining the under-21 side. He made his senior debut during the 1989–90 National League. Daly subsequently became a regular member of the starting fifteen and won two All-Ireland medals and three Munster medals. He captained the team to the All-Ireland title in 1995 and 1997.

As a member of the Munster inter-provincial team on a number of occasions, Daly won two Railway Cup medals. At club level he is a one-time Munster medallist with Clarecastle. In addition to this he also won five championship medals.

Throughout his career Daly made 30 championship appearances. He announced his retirement from inter-county hurling on 21 February 2002.

His uncles, Haulie and John Daly, also played hurling with Clare.

Daly is widely regarded as one of Clare's all-time greatest and most popular players. During his playing days he won three All-Star awards, while he was later chosen as one of the 125 greatest hurlers of all time in a 2009 poll.

In retirement from playing Daly became involved in team management and coaching. After guiding Clarecastle, Kilmoyley and Kilmihil to club titles in their respective counties, he had an unsuccessful three-year spell as manager of the Clare senior team. During a six-year tenure as Dublin manager Daly guided the team to their first provincial and national successes in over fifty years.

== Biography ==
Anthony Daly was born in Clarecastle, County Clare in 1969. He was educated at the local national school and showed great skill at the game of hurling in his youth. He later attended St. Flannan's College in Ennis, a virtual nursery for young hurling talent. It was here that Daly first tasted hurling success when he won both Dr. Harty Cup and All-Ireland colleges' titles with the college in 1987. Daly later worked as a bank official, before leaving this job to open his own pub. He owned a sports shop in O'Connell Street, Ennis, before it closed in 2012. He also owns Murty Brownes pub in Tullycrine, Co Clare, which he ran from 1999 before leasing out in 2009. He married Eilish Murphy in 1997, they have three daughters.

On 28 February 2008 Daly was profiled on the TG4 television programme Laochra Gael. In October 2014, Dalo, his autobiography was released. It was nominated for the 2014 Irish Sports Book of the Year award.

== Playing career ==
=== Clarecastle ===
Daly began his hurling career at club level with Clarecastle. After coming to prominence at juvenile and underage levels, he joined the club's senior team in 1987 and claimed his first counth senior championship medal as a substitute that year after a 0-15 to 0-11 defeat of Feakle in the final. Daly subsequently became a member of the starting fifteen and was at left wing-back when Clarecastle suffered a 3-14 to 1-11 defeat by Sixmilebridge in the 1989 final.

Daly claimed his second winners' medal, his first on the field of play, when Clarecastle beat Scariff by 0-14 to 1-05 in the 1991 final. By the time Clarecastle reached the 1994 final, Daly had been appointed team captain. He claimed a third winners' medal and had the honour of collecting the cup after the 1-08 to 0-08 victory over St. Joseph's Doora-Barefield. After defeat to Wolfe Tones in the 1996 final, Daly won a fourth championship medal the following year after a 2-11 to 0-11 win over St. Joseph's Doora-Barefield. He later added a Munster Club Championship medal to his collection after Clarecastle defeated Patrickswell in the 1997 Munster final.

Having suffered a five-point defeat by Sixmilebridge in the 2002 final, Daly lined out in an eighth and final championship decider in 2003. In what was his last senior game for Clarecastle, he ended his career with a fifth winners' medal following the 3-14 to 1-11 defeat of Ballyea.

He also played football with the club. He won two Clare Intermediate Football Championship titles in 1993 and 1998. He came close to be a double county championship winner when the club made it to the Clare Senior Football Championship semi-finals in the early 90's.

=== Inter-county ===
By the late 1980s Daly had come to the attention of the Clare inter-county selectors. He quickly joined the Clare minor team hurling team; however, he narrowly missed out on a Munster medal in 1989 as he was overage by one year. Daly subsequently moved onto the inter-county under-21 team but had little success in this grade either.

In late 1989 Daly played with the Clare senior team for the first time in a National Hurling League game against Waterford. It was a successful campaign as he subsequently won a Division 2 winners' medal in his debut season. Daly made his first Munster Championship appearance in 1990 when Clare took on Limerick, however, it wasn't a happy period for Clare, then regarded as the minnows of Munster hurling. Two years later in 1992 Daly was appointed captain of the Clare senior hurling team, a position he held until 2000.

In 1993 Clare were trounced in the Munster decider by Tipperary in 1993, having already being relegated from the top flight of the National League.

After winning a second Division 2 title in the National League in 1994, Daly's side went on to lose another Munster decider, this time to Limerick. In spite of these setbacks, Daly won a first All-Star award that year.

In 1995 Ger Loughnane took over as manager of the Clare senior hurling team and made sweeping changes. New fitness regimes and new personalised diets and, above all, a new psychological approach, resulted in the fittest and most prepared Clare team ever taking to the field for a third consecutive Munster final in 1995. Limerick were the opponents for a second consecutive year and took an early lead. Clare never surrendered and, thanks to an inspirational penalty by goalkeeper Davy FitzGerald, fought back to win by 1–17 to 0–11. It was Daly's first Munster title and Clare's first since 1932. Daly's side later qualified for the All-Ireland final and were the underdogs against reigning champions Offaly. Although trailing at half-time, substitute Éamonn Taaffe scored a crucial goal to propel Clare to a 1–13 to 2–8 victory. It was their first championship title in eighty-one years. As well as collecting an All-Ireland medal as captain, Daly was later honoured with his second All-Star award.

After surrendering their provincial and All-Ireland crowns in 1996, Clare bounced back the following year. A 1–18 to 0–18 defeat of Tipperary gave Daly a second Munster medal in three years. Clare subsequently qualified for the All-Ireland decider. Due to the introduction of the "back-door" system Tipperary provided the opposition in the first all-Munster All-Ireland final. The game itself was one of the best of the decade. Clare were well on top for much of the game, however, Liam Cahill and Eugene O'Neill scored twice for Tipp in the last ten minutes. John Leahy missed a goal chance in the last minute while another Tipp point was controversially ruled wide. At the full-time whistle Clare won by a single point – 0–20 to 2–13. It was a second All-Ireland medal for Daly as captain.

Daly won his third and final Munster medal in 1998 following a tense draw and a replay with Waterford. While Clare were installed as the favourites to retain their All-Ireland crown, a series of bizarre events led to one of the most controversial championship summers ever. Clare drew with Offaly in the All-Ireland semi-final, however, in the replay Clare were winning by two points when the referee, Jimmy Cooney, blew the whistle with two minutes of normal time left to be played. The Offaly fans were outraged and staged a sit-down protest on the Croke Park pitch. The result wasn't allowed to stand and Clare were forced to meet Offaly for a third time that year. They lost the second replay. Daly later won a third All-Star award.

A defeat by Cork in the Munster decider in 1999 brought an end to the golden age of Clare hurling.

In early 2001 there was much speculation that Daly was going to retire from inter-county hurling. After initially returning to the training panel he opted out again prior to the championship. After contemplating a return to the inter-county scene again in 2002, Daly finally confirmed his retirement in 2002.

=== Inter-provincial ===
Daly also lined out with Munster in the inter-provincial hurling championship where he played alongside his championship rivals from other Munster hurling counties. He first played for his province in 1993 as Munster were surprisingly defeated by Ulster in the semi-final. Defeat was Munster's lot again in 1994; however, Daly won his first Railway Cup title following a defeat of Ulster in 1995.

Daly was provincial captain in 1996 as he collected a second Railway Cup title after Munster's victory over Leinster.

== Managerial career ==
Anthony Daly
Sport
Club management
- Years: Club
- 2007–2010: Kilmoyley
| | 2 | 0 | 0 |
Inter-county management
- Years: Team
- 2003–2006 2008–2014: Clare; Dublin
Inter-county titles as manager
| County | League | Province | All-Ireland |
| Dublin | 0 | 1 | 1 |

=== Clarecastle ===
In 2002 Daly had just retired from club hurling when he took over as trainer of the Clarecastle senior hurling team. In his debut year he guided the club to the county championship final, however, Sixmilebridge were the winners on that occasion.

=== Clare ===
Daly was appointed manager of the Clare senior hurling team on 22 October 2003. After a relatively unsuccessful National League campaign Daly's side were trounced by Waterford in their first championship outing. After successfully completing the qualifiers system Clare were eventually defeated by reigning champions Kilkenny following an exciting draw and a replay.

In 2005 Daly's side exited the provincial championship at an early stage once again. After topping group B of the qualifier series Clare subsequently defeated Wexford to set up an All-Ireland semi-final meeting with Cork. In that game Daly's side had the reigning All-Ireland champions on the ropes. Clare led by six points at one stage, however, Cork fought back to defeat Clare by just one point. The defeat was a massive blow for Clare, however, Daly was offered another year as manager thanks to his performance.

In 2006 Clare were comprehensively defeated by Cork in their opening game in the championship. After topping group B of the qualifier series for the second consecutive year Clare subsequently defeated Wexford to set up an All-Ireland semi-final meeting with Kilkenny. Clare, however, were defeated once again. Following this defeat Daly resigned as manager.

=== Kilmihil ===
Between 2001 and 2005 Daly was involved in bringing hurling to West Clare. He managed underage Kilmihil teams from u-14 to minor over a period of 5 years. He enjoyed relative success capturing the 2003 u-16C Clare hurling championship and the 2004 Minor C Clare hurling championship.

=== Kilmoyley ===
Daly returned to club management in 2007 when he took over from John Meyler as manager of the Kilmoyley senior hurling team in Kerry. His first season in charge saw the club reach the championship decider for the first time in three years, however, Lixnaw were the winners by six points.

Kilmoyley returned to the championship decider again in 2008, this time with Causeway as the opposition. A comfortable 1–18 to 0–8 victory gave Daly his first championship title in Kerry.

Daly guided Kilmoyley to a third successive final appearance in 2009. St. Brendan's, Ardfert were the opponents, however, they proved no match for Kilmoyley who recorded a 1–19 to 2–8 victory.

Three-in-a-row proved beyond Daly's Kilmoyley team, as the side were defeated by Lixnaw in the championship semi-final in 2010. Daly stepped down as manager following the defeat.

=== Dublin ===
Daly was ratified as manager of the Dublin senior hurling team on 24 November 2008. Daly chose Vincent Teehan, Richard Stakelum and Ciarán Hetherton as his selectors with the Dublin team for 2009.

Daly guided Dublin to the Walsh cup shield on Sunday 1 February following a 1–20 to 2–15 defeat of Leinster rivals Offaly in Banagher. Previously Dublin overcame Laois comfortably on a 0–18 to 1–8 scoreline to qualify for the final. It was an impressive recovery after the Dubs were trounced 6–12 to 0–12 in the Walsh cup first round by all-Ireland champions Kilkenny at Parnell park on 18 January 2009. Alan McCrabbe impressed for Daly's team scoring twenty six points in the early season competition as the Dubs warmed up for the national league.

The Clare native was on familiar territory on Sunday 8 February as he led Dublin into their opening national hurling league division one encounter against Cork at Páirc Uí Chaoimh. The game was played under the backdrop of the impasse in Cork GAA where the 2008 panel have refused to play under current manager Gerald McCarthy.

The Dubs overcame a determined Cork, who included fifteen debutants, by 4–14 to 1–14. The young Dublin team secured three early first half goals from John Kelly and two from teenager Liam Rushe to lay down the foundations of victory. Alan McCrabbe top scored again for the Dubs with 1–9 as Daly's team garnered two points from their first game of the league campaign.

One week later on 15 February 2009 the Clare native saw a vastly improved performance from his team as Dublin overwhelmed John McIntyre's Galway 2–21 to 0–15 at Parnell Park in round two of the national league division one campaign. Dublin topped Division one following their bright start to the league with two wins from two matches. Dublin finished the league campaign in third position, one place before qualification for the NHL finals. The final game was a loss to Kilkenny by 2 points at Nowlan Park.

Daly's 2009 All-Ireland Senior Hurling Championship began with a Leinster Senior Hurling Championship clash against Antrim. It proved to be a relatively comfortable win for Dublin with McCrabbe dominating with 1-09 in a game that finished 2–16 to 0–12 at Croke Park. This victory set up a semi-final clash against the 2008 leinster finalists Wexford. The semi-final proved to be a hard-fought game at Croke Park. Dublin defeated Wexford by 0–18 to 1–13 with Alan McCrabbe once again dominating the scores with 0–10 which secured Dublins place in the Leinster final for the first time since 1991 which was a loss to Kilkenny. Kilkenny retained the Leinster title with a hard-fought victory against Dublin with Martin Comerfords two goals proving the difference between the sides.

Dublin were drawn in their first ever All-Ireland hurling quarter final against Limerick which could have taken Dublin to their first All-Ireland semi-final since 1948. The game finished with the Treatymen winning 2–18 to 1–17 at Semple Stadium thus ending Dublin and Daly's 2009 campaign.

After a good League campaign in 2009, 2010 didn't go as well Dublin just staying up ahead of Limerick. Dublin started there Leinster Senior Hurling Championship with a Quarter-final win over Laois with set up a semi-final with Kilkenny the side they had been unlucky to lose to the year before in the final. The game turned out to be a very onesided affair with Kilkenny running out easy winners on a scoreline of 4–19 to 0–12.

Dublin entered the All-Ireland Qualifiers at Phase 3 but suffered a shock 1–17 to 0–19 loss to Antrim ended there championship for the year.

2011 started well for Daly and Dublin they won the Walsh Cup beating Kilkenny in the final. He later led Dublin to a first National Hurling League Div 1 final in sixty-five years. In the final they over came Kilkenny by 0–22 to 1–07 to win a first league title since 1939.

In July 2013, Daly managed Dublin to win the 2013 Leinster hurling final against Galway by 2–25 to 2–13, their first title in 52 years. Their hopes of an All Ireland final appearance were dashed as Cork defeated a highly competitive Dublin side by 1:24 to 1:19.

In September 2014, Daly stepped down as Dublin manager after six years in charge.

=== Kilmacud Crokes ===
On the 21 November 2017, Daly was confirmed as the new senior hurling manager of Kilmacud Crokes, succeeding his former Clare team-mate Ollie Baker who had been in the role since 2013.

=== Antrim ===
On 4 December 2018, Daly was named as an advisor to newly appointed Antrim senior hurling team manager Neal Peden in 2019.

== Honours ==
=== Team ===
St Flannan's College

- Dr Croke Cup: 1987
- Dr Harty Cup: 1987

Clarecastle

- Munster Senior Club Hurling Championship (1): 1997
- Clare Senior Club Hurling Championship (5): 1987, 1991, 1994, 1997, 2003
- Clare Intermediate Football Championship (2): 1993, 1998

Clare

- All-Ireland Senior Hurling Championship (2): 1995 (c), 1997 (c)
- Munster Senior Hurling Championship (3): 1995 (c), 1997 (c), 1998 (c)
- National Hurling League (Division 2) (2): 1989–90, 1993–94 (c)

Munster

- Railway Cup (2): 1995, 1996 (c)

=== Individual ===
- All-Stars (3): 1994, 1995, 1998

=== Manager ===
Kilmoyley

- Kerry Senior Club Hurling Championship (2): 2008, 2009

Dublin

- National Hurling League (Division 1) (1): 2011
- Leinster Senior Hurling Championship (1): 2013

Munster

- Railway Cup (1): 2016

== Quotes ==
- "There's been a missing person in Clare for eighty-one long years. Today, that person has been found alive and well. And that person's name is Liam McCarthy." – Daly's speech after accepting the Liam MacCarthy Cup in 1995.

Achievements
| Preceded by Martin Hanamy (Offaly) | All-Ireland Senior Hurling winning captain 1995 | Succeeded by Martin Storey (Wexford) |
| Preceded by Gary Kirby (Munster) | Railway Cup Hurling Final winning captain 1996 | Succeeded by Brian Lohan (Munster) |
| Preceded by Martin Storey (Wexford) | All-Ireland Senior Hurling winning captain 1997 | Succeeded by Hubert Rigney (Offaly) |
Sporting positions
| Preceded by Tommy Guilfoyle | Clare Senior Hurling Captain; 1993–1999 | Succeeded by Brian Lohan |
| Preceded by Cyril Lyons | Clare Senior Hurling Manager; 2003–2006 | Succeeded by Tony Considine |
| Preceded by Tommy Naughton | Dublin Senior Hurling Manager; 2008–2014 | Succeeded by Ger Cunningham |
