= Michael O'Halloran (Clare hurler) =

Irish hurler

Personal information
- Native name: Mícheál Ó hAllúráin (Irish)
- Nickname: Holla
- Born: 1971 (age 54–55) Sixmilebridge, County Clare, Ireland
- Occupation: Sales rep
- Height: 5 ft 11 in (180 cm)

Sport
- Sport: Hurling
- Position: Right corner-back
Clubs
- Years: Club
- Sixmilebridge; Mallow
Club titles
- Clare titles: 3
- Munster titles: 1
- All-Ireland Titles: 1
Inter-county
- Years: County
- 1994-1999: Clare
Inter-county titles
- Munster titles: 3
- All-Irelands: 2
- NHL: 0
- All Stars: 0

Michael O'Halloran (born 1971) is an Irish former hurler who played for Clare SHC club Sixmilebridge and at inter-county level with the Clare senior hurling team. He usually lined out as a corner-back.

== Career ==
O'Halloran first came to hurling prominence as a schoolboy with St. Patrick's Comprehensive School in Shannon. He was a substitute on the school team that was beaten by St. Flannan's College in the final of the Harty Cup in 1989. O'Halloran simultaneously progressed through the various grades at club level with Sixmilebridge before eventually joining the senior team. He was at right corner-back when the club won the All-Ireland Club Championship in 1996. O'Halloran first appeared on the inter-county scene when he earned a call-up to the Clare under-21 hurling team in 1992, however, he left the panel before the start of the championship. He returned to inter-county activity as a member of the senior team under Ger Loughnane in 1994. Over the following four seasons he was part of two All-Ireland Championship-winning teams and also claimed three Munster Championship medals. O'Halloran left the Clare panel during the 1999 National League.

== Honours ==
Sixmilebridge

- All-Ireland Senior Club Hurling Championship: 1996
- Munster Senior Club Hurling Championship: 1995, 2000
- Clare Senior Hurling Championship: 1992, 1993, 1995

Clare

- All-Ireland Senior Hurling Championship: 1995, 1997
- Munster Senior Hurling Championship: 1995, 1997, 1998
