= Alan Neville =

Irish hurler (born 1969)

Personal information
- Native name: Ailéin Ó Nia (Irish)
- Born: 1969 (age 56–57) Clarecastle, County Clare, Ireland

Sport
- Sport: Hurling
- Position: Left corner-forward
Club
- Years: Club
- Clarecastle
Club titles
- Clare titles: 4
- Munster titles: 1
Inter-county
Years	County	Apps (scores)
1992-1995	Clare	7 (0-2)
Inter-county titles
- Munster titles: 0
- All-Irelands: 1
- NHL: 0
- All Stars: 0

Alan Neville (born 1969) is an Irish former hurler who played as a left corner-forward for the Clare senior hurling team.

Neville made his first appearance for the team during the 1992 championship and became a regular member of the starting fifteen over the next few seasons. During that time he won one All-Ireland medal on the field of play and one Munster medal as a non-playing substitute.

At club level Neville is a Munster medalist with Clarecstle. In addition to this he also won four county club championship medals.

In retirement from plays Neville as become involved in team management as a selector with Cratloe.

== Playing career ==
=== Club ===
Neville played his club hurling with his local team in Clarecastle and enjoyed much success during a golden age for the club.

After playing for the club's minor and under-21 teams, Neville made his championship debut in 1987. That year Clarecastle qualified for a second consecutive county championship final. Feakle were the opponents on this occasion, however, Clarecastle made history by retaining the title for the first time. A 0-15 to 0-11 score line gave Neville his first championship medal.

Three-in-a-row proved beyond Neville's side, while Clarecastle were beaten by Sixmilebridge in the county final of 1989.

In 1991 Neville lined out in a third county championship decider. Scariff were the opponents, however, the title went to Clarecastle, giving Neville a second championship medal.

Three years later in 1994 Clarecastle were back in yet another county final. Up-and-coming club side St. Joseph's Doora-Barefield provided the opposition, however, they were no match for Clarecastle. Neville added a third championship medal to his collection.

Defeat in the county final of 1996 gave Clarecasle the impetus to make amends in 1997. St. Joseph's Doora-Barefield lined out in opposition, however, Clarecastle had too much and won the game. It was Neville's fourth county championship winners' medal. Clarecastle subsequently represented the county in the provincial club series of games and even reached the final. Limerick champions Patrickswell provided the opposition, however, a 2–11 to 0–15 score line gave Clarecastle the title and gave O'Loughlin a Munster medal. A defeat of St. Gabriel's of London in the All-Ireland quarter-final saw Neville's side advance to a semi-final meeting with Birr. A thrilling 1–15 to 3–9 draw was followed by an even more exciting replay with extra-time. A narrow 0–12 to 0–11 score line gave Birr the win and saw Clarecastle exit the championship.

=== Inter-county ===
Neville made his senior debut for Clare when he came on as a substitute in a drawn Munster quarter-final game against Waterford. He became a regular substitute over the following three seasons.

In 1995 Ger Loughnane took over as manager and guided Clare to the All-Ireland final. The Bannermen were the underdogs against reigning champions Offaly. Although trailing at half-time, substitute Éamonn Taaffe scored a crucial goal to propel Clare to a 1-13 to 2-8 victory. Neville was introduced as a substitute to collect an All-Ireland medal on the field of play. It was their first championship title in eighty-one years.

== Honours ==
=== Team ===
St Flannan's College

- Dr Croke Cup: 1987
- Dr Harty Cup: 1987

Clarecastle

- Munster Senior Club Hurling Championship (1): 1997
- Clare Senior Club Hurling Championship (4): 1987, 1991, 1994, 1997

Clare

- All-Ireland Senior Hurling Championship (1): 1995
