= 1995 Munster Senior Hurling Championship final =

- Event: 1995 Munster Senior Hurling Championship
Clare	Limerick
1-17	0-11
- Date: 9 July 1995
- Venue: Semple Stadium, Thurles
- Man of the Match: P. J. O'Connell
- Referee: J. McDonnell (Tipperary)
- Weather: Sunny

The 1995 Munster Senior Hurling Championship final was a hurling match played on 9 July 1995 at Semple Stadium, Thurles, County Tipperary. It was contested by Clare and Limerick. Clare claimed their first Munster Championship since 1932 and fourth ever, after beating Limerick on a scoreline of 1–17 to 0–11. Clare were leading the game by 1–5 to 0–7 at half-time.

With the scores at 0–5 to 0–3 in Clare's favour in the first half, Davy Fitzgerald scored from a penalty five minutes before the break, crashing the ball high into the net at the town end before sprinting back to his goal-line. In 2005, this penalty goal came fifth in the Top 20 GAA Moments poll by the Irish public. Clare were captained by Anthony Daly and managed by Ger Loughnane in his first year.

Clare had defeated Cork in the semi-final by 2–13 to 3–09 to reach the final, while Limerick had defeated Tipperary by 0–16 to 0–15 in their semi-final.

The match was screened live by RTÉ as part of The Sunday Game programme, with commentary by Ger Canning and analysis by Éamonn Cregan.

== Match ==
=== Details ===
9 July
Final

Clare	1-17 – 0-11	Limerick
J. O'Connor (0-6), P. J. Connell (0-4), D. FitzGerald (1-0), C. Clancy (0-2), S. McMahon (0-1), F. Tuohy (0-1), F. Hegarty (0-1), S. McNamara (0-1), G. O'Loughlin (0-1).	Report	G. Kirby (0-6), M. Galligan (0-3), P. Heffernan (0-1), F. Carroll (0-1).

Semple Stadium, Thurles
Referee: J. McDonnell (Tipperary)
