= 1997 Munster Senior Hurling Championship final =

- Event: 1997 Munster Senior Hurling Championship
Clare	Tipperary
1-18	0-18
- Date: 6 July 1997
- Venue: Páirc Uí Chaoimh, Cork
- Referee: Pat O'Connor (Limerick)
- Attendance: 43,560
- Weather: Sunny

The 1997 Munster Senior Hurling Championship final (sponsored by Guinness) was a hurling match played on Sunday 6 July 1997 at Páirc Uí Chaoimh, Cork. It was contested by Clare and Tipperary. Clare, captained by Anthony Daly and managed by Ger Loughnane, claimed the title, beating Tipperary on a scoreline of 1-18 to 0-18. The match was shown live in Ireland as part of The Sunday Game Live on RTÉ Two.

The win was the first for Clare over Tipperary in a Munster final. Both teams would go on to contest the 1997 All-Ireland final, two months later, a game which was also won by Clare on a 2-13 to 0-20 scoreline.

== Match ==
=== Details ===
6 July
Final

Clare	1-18 – 0-18	Tipperary
J. O'Connor (0-5), D. Forde (1-1), G. O'Loughlin (0-3), S. McMahon (0-3), P. J. O'Connell (0-2), C. Lynch (0-1), F. Tuohy (0-1), S. McNamara (0-1), B. Murphy (0-1).	Report; Full Match	T. Dunne (0-7), D. Ryan (0-4), K. Tucker (0-3), J. Leahy (0-3), M. Cleary (0-1).

Páirc Uí Chaoimh, Cork
Attendance: 43,560
Referee: Pat O'Connor (Limerick)

== See also ==
- Clare–Tipperary hurling rivalry
