= 1995 All-Ireland Senior Hurling Championship =

Championship details
- Dates: 30 April – 3 September 1995
- Teams: 19

All-Ireland champions
- Winning team: Clare (2nd win)
- Captain: Anthony Daly
- Manager: Ger Loughnane

All-Ireland Finalists
- Losing team: Offaly
- Captain: Johnny Pilkington
- Manager: Éamonn Cregan

Provincial champions
- Munster: Clare
- Leinster: Offaly
- Ulster: Down
- Connacht: Galway

Championship statistics
- No. matches played: 19
- Top Scorer: Johnny Dooley (0–27)
- Player of the Year: Seánie McMahon; Brian Lohan
- All-Star Team: See here

The All-Ireland Senior Hurling Championship of 1995 (known for the first time for sponsorship reasons as the Guinness Hurling Championship 1995) was the 109th staging of Ireland's premier hurling knock-out competition. Clare won the championship, beating Offaly 1–13 to 2–8 in the final at Croke Park, Dublin, it was their first All-Ireland win since 1914.

== Pre-championship ==
=== Sponsorship ===
In 1994 Bank of Ireland became the first ever sponsor of the All-Ireland Senior Football Championship. Following the success of this deal it was decided that the hurling championship could also benefit from sponsorship. The decision, however, to award the sponsorship deal to Guinness was a controversial one, as there were concerns over the Gaelic Athletic Association's association with an alcoholic drinks company. Former President of the GAA, Dr. Mick Loftus, was one of the most vocal critics of the proposed sponsorship deal. At a meeting of the Gaelic Athletic Association (GAA) Central Council on 6 May, the decision to make Guinness the sponsor was accepted almost unanimously. The sponsorship deal involved Guinness providing £3 million to the GAA over three years. £500,000 of this money would go to funding the championship, while a similar amount would go to the marketing and promotion of the game.

=== Betting ===
Prior to the opening of the championship former All-Ireland-winning journalists Seán Moran and Tom Humphries gave their predictions for the upcoming championship in The Irish Times. Kilkenny were regarded as the strongest contenders for All-Ireland glory in 1995. They were the reigning National Hurling League champions and had won back-to-back championship titles from three successive final appearances between 1991 and 1993. Offaly, in spite of being reigning All-Ireland champions, were placed second to Kilkenny in the championship stakes. They faced a more difficult passage through the provincial series, however, an anticipated Leinster final meeting with Kilkenny was the only thing stopping the team from making it two-in-a-row. Following the trauma of their All-Ireland defeat the previous year, Limerick were still regarded as the brightest prospect in Munster. They were given the nod to retain their provincial crown and challenge, once again, for the All-Ireland title.

== Team changes ==
=== To Championship ===
Promoted from the All-Ireland Senior B Hurling Championship

- London (qualified)

=== From Championship ===
Regraded to the All-Ireland Senior B Hurling Championship

- Wicklow

== Teams ==
=== Participating counties ===
Province	County	Stadium	Manager	Most recent success			
Province	County	Stadium	Manager	All-Ireland	Provincial	NHL	Position in 1994
Leinster	Dublin	Parnell Park	Jimmy Gray	1938	1961	1938–39	Beaten by Wexford in Leinster quarter-final replay
	Carlow	Dr. Cullen Park	Martin Fitzpatrick				Beaten by Meath in Leinster second-round
	Kilkenny	Nowlan Park	Ollie Walsh	1993	1993	1994–95	Beaten by Offaly in Leinster semi-final
	Laois	O'Moore Park	Pat Critchley	1915	1949		Beaten by Laois in Leinster semi-final
	Meath	Páirc Tailteann	John Davis				Beaten by Kilkenny in Leinster quarter-final
	Offaly	O'Connor Park	Éamonn Cregan	1994	1994	1990–91	Beat Limerick in All-Ireland final
	Westmeath	Cusack Park	Georgie Leahy				Beaten by Westmeath in Leinster first round
	Wexford	Wexford Park	Liam Griffin	1968	1977	1972–73	Beaten by Offaly in Leinster final
Munster	Clare	Cusack Park	Ger Loughnane	1914	1932	1977–78	Beaten by Limerick in Munster final
	Cork	Páirc Uí Chaoimh	Johnny Clifford	1990	1992	1992–93	Beaten by Limerick in Munster quarter-final
	Kerry	Austin Stack Park	John Meyler	1891	1891		Beaten by Clare in Munster semi-final
	Limerick	Gaelic Grounds	Tom Ryan	1973	1994	1991–92	Beaten by Offaly in All-Ireland final
	Tipperary	Semple Stadium	Tom Fogarty	1991	1993	1993–94	Beaten by Clare in Munster quarter-final
	Waterford	Walsh Park	Joe Carton	1959	1963	1962–63	Beaten by Limerick in Munster semi-final
Connacht	Galway	Pearse Stadium	Mattie Murphy	1988	1922	1988–89	Beaten by Offaly in All-Ireland semi-final
	Roscommon	Dr. Hyde Park	Michael Kelly		1913		Beaten by Galway in All-Ireland quarter-final
Ulster	Antrim	Casement Park	Dominic McKinley		1994		Beaten by Limerick in All-Ireland semi-final
	Down	Páirc Esler	Seán McGuinness		1992		Beaten by Antrim in Ulster final
Britain	London	Emerald Grounds		1901			Did not take part

=== Format ===
==== Munster Championship ====
Quarter-final: (2 matches) These are two lone matches between the first four teams drawn from the province of Munster. Two teams are eliminated at this stage, while two teams advance to the next round.

Semi-finals: (2 matches) The winners of the two quarter-finals join the other two Munster teams to make up the semi-final pairings. Two teams are eliminated at this stage, while two teams advance to the next round.

Final: (1 match) The winners of the two semi-finals contest this game. One team is eliminated at this stage, while the winners advance to the All-Ireland semi-final.

==== Leinster Championship ====
First round: (1 match) This is a single match between two 'weaker' teams drawn from the province of Leinster. One team is eliminated at this stage, while the winners advance to the second round.

Second Round: (1 match) The winner of the first round play another 'weaker' team. One team is eliminated at this stage, while the winners advance to the Leinster quarter-final.

Quarter-finals: (2 matches) The winner of the second-round game joins three other Leinster teams to make up the two quarter-final pairings. Two teams are eliminated at this stage, while two teams advance to the Leinster semi-finals.

Semi-finals: (2 matches) The winners of the two quarter-finals join two other Leinster teams to make up the semi-final pairings. Two teams are eliminated at this stage, while two teams advance to the Leinster final.

Final: (1 match) The winner of the two semi-finals contest this game. One team is eliminated at this stage, while the winners advance to the All-Ireland semi-final.

==== Ulster Championship ====
Final: (1 match) This is a lone match between the two competing Ulster teams. One team is eliminated at this stage, while the winners advance to the All-Ireland quarter-final.

==== Connacht Championship ====
Final: (1 match) This is a lone match between the two competing Connacht teams. One team is eliminated at this stage, while the winners advance to the All-Ireland semi-final where the play the Munster champions.

==== All-Ireland Championship ====
Quarter-final: (1 match) This is a lone match between the Ulster champions and the All-Ireland 'B' champions. One team is eliminated at this stage, while the winners advance to the All-Ireland semi-final where they play the Leinster champions.

Semi-finals: (2 matches) The Munster and Leinster champions will play the winners of the lone quarter-final and the Connacht champions. Two teams are eliminated at this stage, while the two winners advance to the All-Ireland final.

Final: (1 match) The two semi-final winners will contest the final.

== Managerial changes ==
=== Pre-championship ===
Team	1995 Manager	1994 Manager	Reason for leaving	Story/Accomplishments
Clare	Ger Loughnane, double National League-winner with Clare.	Len Gaynor	Resigned	Gaynor guided Clare to back-to-back Munster finals, however, they were defeated on both occasions.

== Provincial championships ==
=== Connacht Senior Hurling Championship ===
July 16
Final

Roscommon	2–12 – 2–21	Galway
P. Feeney (1–1), T. Killian (1–0), C. Kelly (0–3), N. Cunniffe (0–2), J. Mannion (0–2), B. Boyle (0–1), R. Dooley (0–1), L. Murray (0–1), A. Kelly (0–1).		J. Cooney (1–4), J. Campbell (1–1), F. Forde (0–4), P. Kelly (0–3), M. McGrath (0–2), C. Moran (0–2), J. Rabbitte (0–2), O. Fahy (0–1), B. Keogh (0–1), M. Coleman (0–1),

Dr. Hyde Park, Roscommon
Referee: P. Delaney (Laois)

=== Leinster Senior Hurling Championship ===
Semifinal		Final
		Carlow	3–14
Meath	1–13	Westmeath	6–06
Carlow	2–11

Quarter-finals
Wexford	6–23
Westmeath	1–07
Kilkenny	2–14
Laois	2–12

Semi-finals
Offaly	2–14
Wexford	1–10
Kilkenny	4–13
Dublin	2–10

Final
Offaly	2–16
Kilkenny	2–05

April 30
First Round

Meath	1–13 – 2–11	Carlow
P. Potterton (0–7), D. Martin (1–3), J. Andrews (0–1), B. Murray (0–1), M. Cole (0–1).		M. Slye (1–4), J. Byrne (1–0), M. Farrell (0–3), D. Doyle (0–2), B. Hayden (0–1), N. English (0–1).

Athboy
Referee: P. Horan (Offaly)

May 14
Second Round

Carlow	3–14 – 6–6	Westmeath
D. Murphy (1–4), D. Doyle (1–1), J. Byrne (1–1), M. Slye (0–4), T. Murphy (0–1), M. Farrell (0–1), J. English (0–1), B. Hayden (0–1).		S. McLoughlin (3–1), B. Kennedy (1–2), D. Kilcoyne (1–1), R. Galvin (1–1), P. Galvin (0–1).

Dr. Cullen Park, Carlow
Referee: J. Guinan (Kilkenny)

June 4
Quarter-Final

Wexford	6–23 – 1–7	Westmeath
B. Byrne (3–0), L. Murphy (2–2), T. Dempsey (1–3), R. McCarthy (0–5), E. Scallan (0–2), P. Codd (0–2), I. Hassey (0–2), L. Dunne (0–2), M. Storey (0–2), G. O'Connor (0–1).		S. Qualter (1–0), R. Galvin (0–3), McLoughlin (0–3), N. Kennedy (0–1).

Dr. Cullen Park, Carlow
Attendance: 12,000
Referee: P. Aherne (Carlow)

June 4
Quarter-Final

Kilkenny	2–14 – 2–12	Laois
D. Byrne (2–2), A. Ronan (0–4), D. J. Carey (0–3), C. Brennan (0–2), C. Carter (0–1), E. Morrissey (0–1), P. O'Neill (0–1).		F. Lalor (1–6), D. Conroy (1–1), F. O'Sullivan (0–2), O. Dowling (0–1), N. Rigney (0–1), J. Dollard (0–1).

Dr. Cullen Park, Carlow
Attendance: 12,000
Referee: W. Barrett (Tipperary)

June 25
Semi-Final

Offaly	2–14 – 1–10	Wexford
Johnny Dooley (0–8), J. Troy (1–2), Joe Dooley (1–1), M. Duignan (0–2), J. Pilkington (0–1).		L. Dunne (0–5), B. Byrne (1–1), M. Dempsey (0–3), M. Storey (0–1).

Croke Park, Dublin
Referee: A. Mac Suibhne (Dublin)

June 25
Semi-Final

Kilkenny	4–13 – 2–10	Dublin
E. Morrissey (3–3), D. Byrne (1–2), A. Ronan (0–4), D. J. Carey (0–1), C. Brennan (0–1), P. O'Neill (0–1), D. Gaffney (0–1).		J. Twomey (1–4), V. Murphy (0–4), S. Cooke (1–0), G. Harrigton (0–1), S. McDermott (0–1).

Croke Park, Dublin
Referee: P. Delaney (Laois)

July 16
Final

Offaly	2–16 – 2–5	Kilkenny
B. Dooley (0–5), P. O'Connor (1–1), D. Regan (1–0), M. Duignan (0–3), Johnny Dooley (0–3), J. Troy (0–2), B. Whelehan (0–1), J. Pilkington (0–1).		D. J. Carey (2–0), A. Ronan (0–3), P. J. Delaney (0–1), P. O'Neill (0–1).

Croke Park, Dublin
Attendance: 25,000
Referee: D. Murphy (Wexford)

=== Munster Senior Hurling Championship ===
Quarter-finals
Kerry	0–12
Cork	1–22
Tipperary	4–23
Waterford	1–11

Semi-finals
Clare	2–13
Cork	3–09
Limerick	0–16
Tipperary	0–15

Final
Clare	1–17
Limerick	0–11

May 20
Quarter-Final

Kerry	0–12 – 1–22	Cork
P. O'Connell (0–4), M. Hennessy (0–3), C. Walsh (0–2), P. O'Rourke (0–1), B. O'Mahony (0–1), B. O'Sullivan (0–1).		B. Egan (0–7), A. Browne (1–1), D. O'Donoghue (0–4), T. O'Sullivan (0–4), K. Murray (0–3), K. Morrisson (0–2), C. Casey (0–1).

Austin Stack Park, Tralee
Attendance: 6,000
Referee: J. McDonnell (Tipperary)

May 21
Quarter-Final

Tipperary	4–23 – 1–11	Waterford
P. Fox (2–4), M. Cleary (1–4), A. Ryan (1–2), N. English (0–4), D. Ryan (0–4), T. Dunne (0–3), J. Leahy (0–2).		G. Harris (1–1), P. Flynn (0–3), G. Gater (0–3), T. Browne (0–1), T. Fives (0–1), B. O'Sullivan (0–1), P. Queally (0–1).

Páirc Uí Chaoimh, Cork
Referee: T. Murray (Limerick)

June 4
Semi-Final

Clare	2–13 – 3–9	Cork
G. O'Loughlin (1–3), O. Baker (1–1), J. O'Connor (0–4), P. J. O'Connell (0–2), F. Hegarty (0–1), C. Clancy (0–1), S. McMahon (0–1).		K. Murray (1–2), A. Browne (1–2), G. Manley (1–0), M. Mullins (0–2), B. Egan (0–1), D. O'Donoghue (0–1), K. Morrisson (0–1).

Gaelic Grounds, Limerick
Referee: P. O'Connor (Limerick)

June 18
Semi-Final

Limerick	0–16 – 0–15	Tipperary
G. Kirby (0–12), M. Galligan (0–1), T. J. Ryan (0–1), D. Quigley (0–1), S. O'Neill (0–1).		M. Cleary (0–4), B. Ryan (0–2), A. Ryan (0–2), N. English (0–2), J. Leahy (0–2), P. Fox (0–1), A. Crosse (0–1), D. Ryan (0–1).

Páirc Uí Chaoimh, Cork
Attendance: 32,134
Referee: D. Murphy (Wexford)

July 9
Final

Clare	1–17 – 0–11	Limerick
J. O'Connor (0–6), P. J. Connell (0–4), D. FitzGerald (1–0), C. Clancy (0–2), S. McMahon (0–1), F. Tuohy (0–1), F. Hegarty (0–1), S. McNamara (0–1), G. O'Loughlin (0–1).		G. Kirby (0–6), M. Galligan (0–3), P. Heffernan (0–1), F. Carroll (0–1).

Semple Stadium, Thurles
Referee: J. McDonnell (Tipperary)

=== Ulster Senior Hurling Championship ===
July 9
Final

Antrim	1–13 – 3–7	Down
G. O'Kane (0–6), J. Boyle (1–0), T. McNaughton (0–2), J. Carson (0–2), P. Donnelly (0–2), S. P. McKillop (0–1).		K. Coulter (2–1), H. Gilmore (0–4), D. O'Prey (1–0), M. Blaney (0–1), P. Coulter (0–1).

Casement Park, Belfast
Attendance: 7,000
Referee: A. Mac Suibhne (Dublin)

July 16
Final
Replay

Antrim	2–10 – 1–19	Down
G. O'Kane (1–5), J. Carson (1–0), T. McNaughton (0–1), A. Elliot (0–1), S. McMullan (0–1), S. P. McKillop (0–1), C. McCambridge (0–1).		N. Sands (1–2), J. McCarthy (0–4), H. Gilmore (0–4), K. Coulter (0–3), D. Hughes (0–2), P. Coulter (0–1), C. Arthurs (0–1), M. Mallon (0–1), D. Woods (0–1).

Casement Park, Belfast
Referee: A. Mac Suibhne (Dublin)

== All-Ireland Senior Hurling Championship ==
=== Bracket ===
Quarter-finals
London	0–09
Down	0–16

Semi-finals
Offaly	2–19
Down	2–08
Clare	3–12
Galway	1–13

Final
Offaly	2–08
Clare	1–13

=== All-Ireland quarter-finals ===
July 23
Quarter-Final

London	0–9 – 0–16	Down
T. Galway (0–4), M. Cunningham (0–2), D. McKenna (0–1), T. Corbett (0–1), J. Kennedy (0–1).	Report	K. Coulter (0–4), C. Arthurs (0–3), H. Gilmore (0–3), N. Sands (0–2), M. Mallon (0–1), J. McCarthy (0–1), B. Coulter (0–1), M. Blaney (0–1).

Emerald GAA Grounds, Ruislip
Attendance: 2,000
Referee: J. O'Leary (Cork)

=== All-Ireland semi-finals ===
August 6
Semi-Final

Offaly	2–19 – 2–8	Down
Johnny Dooley (0–11), B. Dooley (1–2), M. Duignan (1–1), P. O'Connor (0–1), J. Troy (0–1), Joe Dooley (0–1), B. Whelehan (0–1), J. Pilkington (0–1).	Report	P. Coulter (1–0), N. Sands (1–0), H. Gilmore (0–3), K. Coulter (0–1), D. Hughes (0–1), J. McCarthy (0–1).

Croke Park, Dublin
Referee: W. Barrett (Tipperary)

August 6
Semi-Final

Clare	3–12 – 1–13	Galway
G. O'Loughlin (2–1), J. O'Connor (0–7), S. McNamara (1–1), L. Doyle (0–1), F. Tuohy (0–1), P. J. O'Connell (0–1).	Report	J. Cooney (0–6), F. Forde (1–1), J. Campbell (0–2), O. Fahy (0–2), L. Burke (0–1), M. Coleman (0–1).

Croke Park, Dublin
Attendance: 54,512
Referee: D. Murphy (Wexford)

=== All-Ireland final ===
September 3
Final
15:30 BST

Clare	1–13 – 2–8	Offaly
F. Tuohy (0–4), E. Taffe (1–0), S. McMahon (0–3), J. O'Connor (0–2), F. Hegarty (0–1), G. O'Loughlin (0–1), O. Baker (0–1), A. Daly (0–1).	Report	Johnny Dooley (0–5), J. Pilkington (1–0), M. Duignan (1–0), J. Troy (0–1), D. Regan (0–1), B. Dooley (0–1).

Croke Park, Dublin
Attendance: 65,092
Referee: D. Murphy (Wexford)

== Championship statistics ==
=== Scoring ===
- First goal of the championship: John Byrne for Carlow against Meath (Leinster first round)
- Last goal of the championship: Éamonn Taaffe for Clare against Offaly (All-Ireland final)
- Hat-trick heroes:
  - First hat-trick of the championship: Seán McLoughlin for Westmeath against Carlow (Leinster first round)
  - Second hat-trick of the championship: Billy Byrne for Wexford against Westmeath (Leinster quarter-final)
  - Third hat-trick of the championship: Eamon Morrissey for Kilkenny against Dublin (Leinster semi-final)
- Widest winning margin: 31 points
  - Wexford 6–23 : 1–7 Westmeath (Leinster quarter-final)
- Most goals in a match: 9
  - Carlow 3–14 : 6–6 Westmeath (Leinster first round)
- Most points in a match: 34
  - Kerry 0–12 : 1–22 Cork (Munster semi-final)
  - Tipperary 4–23 : 1–11 Waterford (Munster semi-final)
- Most goals by one team in a match: 6
  - Westmeath 6–6 : 3–14 Carlow (Leinster first round)
- Most goals scored by a losing team: 3
  - Carlow 3–14 : 6–6 Westmeath (Leinster first round)
  - Cork 3–9 : 2–13 Clare (Munster semi-final)
- Most points scored by a losing team: 14
  - Carlow 3–14 : 6–6 Westmeath (Leinster second round)

=== Overall ===
- Most goals scored – Kilkenny (8)
- Most goals conceded – Carlow (7)
- Fewest goals conceded – Tipperary (1)
- Fewest points conceded – Meath (11)
- Fewest goals scored – Meath, Limerick, London (0)
- Fewest points scored – London (9)

=== Discipline ===
- First red card of the championship: Johnny Kavanagh for Carlow against Meath (Leinster first round)

=== Top scorers ===
==== Season ====
Rank	Player	County	Tally	Total	Matches	Average
1	Johnny Dooley	Offaly	0–27	27	4	6.75
2	Jamesie O'Connor	Clare	0–19	19	4	4.75
3	Gary Kirby	Limerick	0–18	18	2	9.00
4	Tom Galway	London	1–15	18	3	6.00
5	Ger O'Loughlin	Clare	3–6	15	4	3.75
5	Kevin Coulter	Down	2–9	15	4	3.75
7	Greg O'Kane	Antrim	1–11	14	2	7.00
7	Hugh Gilmore	Down	0–14	14	4	3.50
9	Billy Byrne	Wexford	4–1	13	2	6.50
9	Denis Byrne	Kilkenny	3–4	13	3	4.33
9	Eamon Morrissey	Kilkenny	3–4	13	3	4.33
9	Seán McLoughlin	Westmeath	3–4	13	2	6.50

==== Single game ====
Rank	Player	County	Tally	Total	Opposition
1	Eamon Morrissey	Kilkenny	3–3	12	Dublin
1	Gary Kirby	Limerick	0–12	12	Tipperary
3	Johnny Dooley	Offaly	0–11	11	Down
4	Seán McLoughlin	Westmeath	3–1	10	Carlow
4	Pat Fox	Tipperary	2–4	10	Waterford
6	Tom Galway	London	1-06	9	New York
6	Billy Byrne	Wexford	3–0	9	Westmeath
6	Fintan Lalor	Laois	1–6	9	Kilkenny
9	Larry Murphy	Wexford	2–2	8	Westmeath
9	Denis Byrne	Kilkenny	2–2	8	Laois
9	Johnny Dooley	Offaly	0–8	8	Wexford
9	Gary O'Kane	Antrim	1–5	8	Down

== Miscellaneous ==
- Down win the Ulster title for the third time in their history. It is their second provincial title in three years.
- The All-Ireland semi-final meeting of Clare and Galway is their first championship clash since the 1967 championship.
- Clare win the Munster title for the first time since the 1932 championship. They later claim the All-Ireland title for the first time since 1914.
- The meeting of Down and Offaly in the All-Ireland semi-final was their first-ever clash in the history of the championship.
- The meeting of Clare and Offaly in the All-Ireland final was their first-ever clash in the history of the championship.

=== Debutantes ===
The following players made their début in the 1995 championship:

Player	Team	Date	Opposition	Game
Alan Browne	Cork	May 20	Kerry	Munster quarter-final
Pat Kenneally	Cork	May 20	Kerry	Munster quarter-final
Fergal McCormack	Cork	May 20	Kerry	Munster quarter-final
Kieran Morrison	Cork	May 20	Kerry	Munster quarter-final
John O'Driscoll	Cork	May 20	Kerry	Munster quarter-final
Darren Ronan	Cork	May 20	Kerry	Munster quarter-final
Peter Smith	Cork	May 20	Kerry	Munster quarter-final
Brendan Cummins	Tipperary	May 21	Waterford	Munster quarter-final
Tom Feeney	Waterford	May 21	Tipperary	Munster quarter-final
Fergal Ryan	Cork	June 4	Clare	Munster semi-final
Ollie Baker	Clare	June 4	Cork	Munster semi-final
Conor Clancy	Clare	June 4	Cork	Munster semi-final
Fergal Hegarty	Clare	June 4	Cork	Munster semi-final
Frank Lohan	Clare	June 4	Cork	Munster semi-final
Stephen McNamara	Clare	June 4	Cork	Munster semi-final
Michael O'Halloran	Clare	June 4	Cork	Munster semi-final
Éamonn Taaffe	Clare	September 3	Offaly	All-Ireland final

=== Retirees ===
The following players played their last game in the 1995 championship:

Player	Team	Date	Opposition	Game	Début
Tony O'Sullivan	Cork	May 20	Kerry	Munster quarter-final	1982
John Chaplin	Clare	June 4	Cork	Munster semi-final	1991
Stephen Sheedy	Clare	June 4	Cork	Munster semi-final	1993
P. J. Martin	Offaly	June 22	Wexford	Leinster semi-final	1988
Jim McInerney	Clare	August 6	Galway	All-Ireland semi-final	1985
Cyril Lyons	Clare	September 3	Offaly	All-Ireland final	1983
Alan Neville	Clare	September 3	Offaly	All-Ireland final	1992
Brendan Kelly	Offaly	September 3	Clare	All-Ireland final	1990

== See also ==
- 1995 All-Ireland Senior B Hurling Championship
