= Billy Byrne (hurler) =

Irish hurler (born 1960)

Personal information
- Native name: Liam Ó Broin (Irish)
- Born: January 1960 (age 66) Gorey, County Wexford, Ireland
- Occupation: Sales rep

Sport
- Sport: Hurling
- Position: Full-forward
Club
- Years: Club
- Naomh Éanna
Club titles
- Wexford titles: 0
Inter-county
Years	County	Apps (scores)
1983-1998	Wexford	35 (12-26)
Inter-county titles
- Leinster titles: 2
- All-Irelands: 1
- NHL: 0
- All Stars: 0

William Byrne (born January 1960) is an Irish hurling coach and former player. At the club level, he played with Naomh Éanna and at the inter-county level, he was a member of the Wexford senior hurling team.

== Playing career ==
At club level, Byrne first played for Naomh Éanna in Gorey at juvenile and underage levels, before progressing to adult level. He won his first Wexford IHC title in 1990 following a defeat of Shelmaliers in the final. Byrne claimed a second IHC medal in 2001 when Rathgarogue-Cushinstown was beaten by 1-14 to 3-07. He brought his club career to an end in 2005.

Byrne first appeared on the inter-county scene with Wexford as a member of the minor team in 1978. He later had an unsuccessful stint with the under-21 team. Byrne joined the senior team in 1992 and quickly became a regular member of the starting fifteen. He won a Leinster SHC medal in 1996, before coming on as a substitute for Larry Murphy when Wexford beat Limerick in the 1996 All-Ireland final.

A second Leinster SHC medal followed for Byrne in 1997, when Wexford retained the title after a defeat of Kilkenny. He also earned selection for the Leinster team and won a Railway Cup medal in 1988. Byrne's inter-county involvement came to an end in 1998.

== Coaching career ==
Byrne has also been involved in underage coaching at club level with Naomh Éanna.

== Honours ==
Naomh Éanna

- Wexford Intermediate Hurling Championship: 1990, 2001

Wexford

- All-Ireland Senior Hurling Championship: 1996
- Leinster Senior Hurling Championship: 1996, 1997

Leinster

- Railway Cup: 1988
