= P. J. Martin =

Irish hurler (born 1965)

Personal information
- Native name: P. S. Ó Máirtín (Irish)
- Born: 1965 (age 60–61) Tullamore, County Offaly, Ireland

Sport
- Sport: Hurling
- Position: Centre-back
Club
- Years: Club
- Tullamore
Club titles
	Football	Hurling
Offaly titles	2	0
Inter-county
Years	County	Apps (scores)
1988-1995	Offaly	3 (0-00)
Inter-county titles
- Leinster titles: 2
- All-Irelands: 0
- NHL: 0
- All Stars: 0

P. J. Martin (born 1965) is an Irish former hurler. At club level, he played with Tullamore and at inter-county level with the Offaly senior hurling team.

== Career ==
Martin played hurling and Gaelic football at all levels with the Tullamore club. He was part of the Tullamore team that beat Kinnitty by 2–15 to 0–08 to win the Offaly IHC title in 1989. As a Gaelic footballer, Martin won Offaly SFC titles in 2000 and 2002.

At inter-county level, Martin first appeared for Offaly as part of the under-21 team in 1985 and 1986. He made his senior team debut in a National Hurling League game against Roscommon in November 1987. Martin later won his first Leinster SHC medal in 1988. After a number of years away from the team, Martin claimed a second Leinster SHC medal, alongside his brother Kevin, in 1995. He was an unused substitute for Offaly's defeat by Clare in the 1995 All-Ireland SHC final.

== Honours ==
Tullamore

- Offaly Senior Football Championship (2): 2000, 2002
- Offaly Intermediate Hurling Championship (1): 1989

Offaly

- Leinster Senior Hurling Championship (2): 1988, 1994
