= P. J. O'Connell =

Irish hurler (born 1970)

Personal information
- Native name: P. S. Ó Conaill (Irish)
- Nickname: Fingers
- Born: 1970 (age 55–56) O'Callaghan's Mills, County Clare, Ireland
- Occupation: Roofing contractor

Sport
- Sport: Hurling
- Position: Centre-forward
Club
- Years: Club
- 1980s-2000s: O'Callaghan's Mills
Club titles
- Clare titles: 0
Inter-county
Years	County	Apps (scores)
1992-2001	Clare	? (3-22)
Inter-county titles
- Munster titles: 3
- All-Irelands: 2
- NHL: 0
- All Stars: 0

P. J. O'Connell (born 1970 in O'Callaghan's Mills, County Clare) is a former Irish sportsperson. He played hurling with his local club O'Callaghan's Mills and was a member of the Clare senior inter-county team in the 1980s and 1990s. O'Connell won two All-Ireland titles with Clare in 1995 and 1997 and three Munster titles.

== Honours ==
Clare

- All-Ireland Senior Hurling Championship (2): 1995, 1997
- Munster Senior Hurling Championship (3): 1995, 1997, 1998
