= Stephen McNamara =

Irish hurler and manager

Personal information
- Native name: Stiofán Mac Conmara (Irish)
- Born: 1973 (age 52–53) Ennis, County Clare, Ireland
- Occupation: AIB Bank

Sport
- Sport: Hurling
- Position: Right corner-forward
Club
- Years: Club
- 1990-2000s: Éire Óg, Ennis
Club titles
	Football	Hurling
Clare titles	3	1
Inter-county
Years	County	Apps (scores)
1995-1999	Clare	8 (4-4)
Inter-county titles
- Munster titles: 3
- All-Irelands: 2
- NHL: 0
- All Stars: 0

Stephen McNamara (born 1973) is an Irish former hurler and manager who played as a right corner-forward for the Clare senior team.

McNamara made his first appearance for the team during the 1995 championship and was a regular member of the starting fifteen until his retirement after the 1999 championship. During that time he won two All-Ireland medals and three Munster medals.

At club level McNamara played with Éire Óg.

In retirement from playing McNamara has become involved in coaching, most notably with Faughs and Ballinteer St. John's in Dublin.

McNamara is the third generation of his family to enjoy All-Ireland success. His grandfather Jackie Power won two All-Ireland medals with Limerick in 1936 and 1940, while his uncle, Ger Power, won eight All-Ireland football medals with Kerry between 1975 and 1986.
