= 1996 Railway Cup Hurling Championship =

Irish hurling competition

- Dates: 25 February 1996 - 18 March 1996
- Teams: 4
- Champions: Munster (40th title); Anthony Daly (captain)
- Runners-up: Leinster; Brian Whelehan (captain)

Tournament statistics
- Matches played: 3
- Goals scored: 9 (3 per match)
- Points scored: 84 (28 per match)
- Top scorer(s): Gary Kirby (4-08)

The 1996 Railway Cup Hurling Championship was the 68th staging of the Railway Cup since its establishment by the Gaelic Athletic Association in 1927. The cup began on 25 February 1996 and ended on 18 March 1996.

Munster were the defending champions.

On 18 March 1996, Munster won the cup after a 2-20 to 0–10 defeat of Leinster in the final at Cusack Park. This was their 40th Railway Cup title overall and their second title in succession.

== Results ==
=== Semi-finals ===
25 February 1996 Semi-final	Connacht	0-18 - 2-16 (aet)	Leinster	Duggan Park, Ballinasloe
	F Forde 0-6, L Burke 0-3, M Coleman 0-3, K Broderick 0-2, N Shaughnessy 0-2, C Moore 0-1, J Rabbitte 0-1.		DJ Carey 1-5, J Troy 1-3, D Byrne 0-3, N Rigney 0-2, J Dooley 0-1, E Morrissey 0-1, M Duignan 0-1.	Referee: J McDonnell (Tipperary)

25 February 1996 Semi-final	Munster	5-13 - 0-07	Ulster	Cusack Park, Ennis
	G Kirby 3-4, G Manley 1-1, J O'Connor 1-1, M Cleary 0-4, D Quigley 0-2, O Baker 0-1.		O Collins 0-1, M Mallon 0-1, O McShea 0-1, J Carson 0-1, G McGrattan 0-1, SP McKillop 0-1, C McCambridge 0-1.	Referee: P Dunphy (Kilkenny)

=== Final ===
18 March 1996 Final	Munster	2-20 - 0-10	Leinster	Cusack Park, Ennis
	G Kirby 1-4, B Corcoran 1-1, M Cleary 0-4, D Quigley 0-3, D Ryan 0-3, J O'Connor 0-2, S McMahon 0-1, C Carey 0-1, O Baker 0-1.		N Rigney 0-3, E Morrissey 0-2, J Troy 0-2, DJ Carey 0-1, J Dooley 0-1, D Byrne 0-1.

== Bibliography ==
- Donegan, Des, The Complete Handbook of Gaelic Games (DBA Publications Limited, 2005).
