= Brendan Kelly (hurler) =

Irish hurler (born 1968)

Personal information
- Native name: Breandán Ó Ceallaigh (Irish)
- Born: 1968 (age 57–58) Lusmagh, County Offaly, Ireland
- Height: 5 ft 10 in (178 cm)

Sport
- Sport: Hurling
- Position: Midfield
Club
- Years: Club
- Lusmagh
Club titles
- Offaly titles: 1
Inter-county
Years	County	Apps (scores)
1986-1997	Offaly	12 (0-3)
Inter-county titles
- Leinster titles: 3
- All-Irelands: 1
- NHL: 1
- All Stars: 0

Brendan Kelly (born 1968) is an Irish retired hurler who played as a midfielder for the Offaly senior team.

Kelly joined the team during the 1986-87 National League and was a regular member of the starting fifteen for over a decade. During that time he won one All-Ireland winners' medal, three Leinster winners' medals and one National Hurling League winners' medal.

At club level Kelly is a one-time county club championship medalist with Lusmagh.

== Honours ==
Lusmagh

- Offaly Senior Hurling Championship (1): 1989

Offaly

- All-Ireland Senior Hurling Championship (1): 1994
- Leinster Senior Hurling Championship (5): 1988, 1989, 1990, 1994, 1995
- National Hurling League (1): 1990–91
- Leinster Under-21 Hurling Championship (1): 1989
- All-Ireland Minor Hurling Championship (1): 1986
- Leinster Minor Hurling Championship (1): 1986
