= Fergal Hegarty =

Irish hurler and manager

Personal information
- Native name: Fearghal Ó hÉigeartaigh (Irish)
- Born: 1975 (age 50–51) Kilnamona, County Clare, Ireland

Sport
- Sport: Hurling
- Position: Left wing-forward
Club
- Years: Club
- Kilnamona
Club titles
- Clare titles: 0
Inter-county
Years	County	Apps (scores)
1994-1999	Clare	12 (0-5)
Inter-county titles
- Munster titles: 2
- All-Irelands: 2
- NHL: 0
- All Stars: 0

Fergal Hegarty (born 1975) is an Irish former hurler and manager who played as a left wing-forward for the Clare senior team.

Hegarty made his first appearance for the team during the 1995 championship and was a regular member of the starting fifteen until his retirement after the 1999 championship. During that time he won two All-Ireland medals and two Munster medals.

In retirement from playing Hegarty has become involved in coaching, most notably with St. Joseph's Doora Barefield. Fergal was involved in the Ballyea Management team in 2016 where they won a historic first County and Munster Title, while in March of that season they contested all Ireland final losing to Cuala.
