= 1986 Munster Senior Hurling Championship final =

- Event: 1986 Munster Senior Hurling Championship
Cork	Clare
2-18	3-12
- Date: 20 July 1986
- Venue: FitzGerald Stadium, Killarney
- Referee: Terence Murray (Limerick)
- Attendance: 39,975

The 1986 Munster Senior Hurling Championship final was a hurling match played on Sunday 20 July 1986 at FitzGerald Stadium, Killarney. It was contested by Cork and Clare. Cork, captained by Tom Cashman, claimed the title, beating Clare on a scoreline of 2–18 to 3–12.

== Match ==
=== Details ===
20 July
Final

Cork	2–18 – 3–12	Clare
J. Fenton (0–8), J. Fitzgibbon (1–1), J. Barry-Murphy (1–1), T. O'Sullivan (0–4), K. Hennessy (0–2), J. Cashmna (0–1), P. Hartnett (0–1).	Report	T. Guilfoyle (2–2), G. McInerney (1–1), C. Lyons (0–4), S. Dolan (0–2), V. Donnellan (0–1), D. Coote (0–1), J. Shanahan (0–1).

FitzGerald Stadium, Killarney
Attendance: 39,975
Referee: Terence Murray (Limerick)
