= Cyril Lyons =

Irish hurler and manager

Personal information
- Native name: Coireall Ó Laighin (Irish)
- Born: Toonagh, County Clare, Ireland
- Occupation: National school principal

Sport
- Sport: Hurling
- Position: Full-forward
Club
- Years: Club
- Ruan
Club titles
- Clare titles: 0
Inter-county
| Years | County | Apps (scores) |
| 1983-1996 | Clare | 24 (7-75) |
Inter-county titles
- Munster titles: 1
- All-Irelands: 1
- NHL: 0
- All Stars: 0

Cyril Lyons (born 1959) is an Irish former hurler and manager who played as a full-forward for the Clare senior team.

Lyons made his first appearance for the team during the 1983 championship and was a regular member of the starting fifteen until his retirement after the 1996 championship. During that time he won one All-Ireland winner's medal and one Munster winners' medal.

At club level Lyons played with Ruan.

In retirement Lyons became involved in coaching. He served one stint as manager of the Clare senior hurling team from 2000 to 2003 where he guided Clare to the 2002 All-Ireland Final, before later training the Clare under-21 team to an All-Ireland title in 2009.

Sporting positions
| Preceded by Ger Loughnane | Clare Senior Hurling Manager; 2000-2003 | Succeeded by Anthony Daly |
