= 1994 Munster Senior Hurling Championship final =

- Event: 1994 Munster Senior Hurling Championship
Limerick	Clare
0-25	2-10
- Date: 10 July 1994
- Venue: Semple Stadium, Thurles
- Referee: Willie Barrett (Tipperary)
- Attendance: 43,638
- Weather: Dry

The 1994 Munster Senior Hurling Championship final was a hurling match played on 10 July 1994 at Semple Stadium, Thurles, County Tipperary. It was contested by Limerick and Clare. Limerick, captained by Gary Kirby, won the game 0-25 to 2-10 to claim their first Munster title since 1981.

== Match ==
=== Details ===
10 July
Final

Limerick	0-25 – 2-10	Clare
G. Kirby (0-9), M. Galligan (0-7), C. Carey (0-2), F. Carroll (0-2), P. Heffernan (0-2), D. Quigley (0-2), T. J. Ryan (0-1).		T. Guilfoyle (1-0), C. Lyons (1-0), G. O;Loughlin (0-3), J. O'Connor (0-3), J. McInerney (0-1), S. Sheedy (0-1), C. Chaplin (0-1), A. Whelan (0-1).

Semple Stadium, Thurles
Attendance: 43,368
Referee: Willie Barrett (Tipperary)
