= Éamonn Taaffe =

Clare hurler

Personal information
- Native name: Éamonn Táth (Irish)
- Born: 18 February 1975 (age 51) Tubber, County Clare, Ireland
- Occupation: Farmer
- Height: 5 ft 11 in (180 cm)

Sport
- Sport: Hurling
- Position: Full-forward
Club
- Years: Club
- Tubber
Club titles
- Clare titles: 0
Inter-county*
Years	County	Apps (scores)
1993–2000	Clare	8 (1–7)
Inter-county titles
- Munster titles: 1
- All-Irelands: 1
- NHL: 0
- All Stars: 0
- *Inter County team apps and scores correct as of 14:30, 16 February 2015.

Éamonn Taaffe (born 18 February 1975) is an Irish former hurler who played as a full-forward for the Clare senior team.

Born in Tubber, County Clare, Taaffe first played competitive hurling during his schooling at Our Lady's College. He arrived on the inter-county scene at the age of seventeen when he first linked up with the Clare minor team, before later joining the under-21 side. He joined the senior panel during the 1993-94 league. Taaffe was a regular member of the team for much of the rest of the decade and won one All-Ireland medal and one Munster medal.

At club level Taaffe played with Tubber

Throughout his career Taaffe made 8 championship appearances. He retired from inter-county hurling following the conclusion of the 2000 championship.

== Playing career ==
=== Colleges ===
During his schooling at Our Lady's College in Gort, Taaffe established himself as a key member of the senior hurling team. In 1993 he a Connacht medal, a first provincial title for the school in almost a decade. St Kieran's College provided the opposition in the subsequent All-Ireland decider. Taaffe's side were somewhat overawed by the occasion and were defeated by 3–15 to 1–10.

=== Club ===
Taaffe played both hurling and Gaelic football with Tubber. After winning an under-16 championship medal he added a senior B championship medal to his collection during the early stage of his club career.

=== Inter-county ===
Taaffe's underage career with the Clare minor and under-21 teams yielded little success.

During the 1993–94 league campaign Taaffe was added to the Clare senior panel by manager Len Gaynor. He played in a number of games but was best known as a player on the fringes of the team.

In 1995, a hamstring injury kept Taaffe off the starting fifteen; however, he collected a Munster SHC medal as an unused substitute, with Clare defeating reigning provincial champions Limerick by 1-17 to 0-11. On 3 September 1995, Clare faced reigning champions Offaly in the All-Ireland decider. Taaffe was not even named on the official list of substitutes, but was introduced in the second half. After a long range speculative shot was sent towards the goalmouth Taaffe was at hand to send the sliotar to the net for the key goal for Clare. He was later substituted; however, Clare went on to win by 1–13 to 2–8, giving him an All-Ireland SHC medal.

Taaffe remained on the bench for the next few years, only starting one championship match. He won a second set of Munster and All-Ireland SHC medals in 1997 as Clare defeated Tipperary in both deciders.

In 1998, Taaffe won his first Munster SHC medal on the field of play following a 2–16 to 0–10 defeat of Waterford in a tense provincial decider replay.

After leaving the panel in 1999, Taaffe returned the following year and made a few cameo appearances as a substitute. His late championship game was a 2–19 to 1–14 Munster SHC semi-final defeat by Tipperary that year.

== Honours ==
=== Player ===
Our Lady's College, Gort

- Connacht Senior Colleges Hurling Championship (1): 1993

Clare

- All-Ireland Senior Hurling Championship (2): 1995, 1997 (sub)
- Munster Senior Hurling Championship (3): 1995 (sub), 1997 (sub), 1998
