= Ger Loughnane =

Irish championship hurler, coach and team manager

Personal information
- Native name: Gearóid Ó Lachtnáin (Irish)
- Born: 1953 (age 72–73) Feakle, County Clare, Ireland
- Height: 6 ft 0 in (183 cm)

Sport
- Sport: Hurling
- Position: Right wing-back
Club
- Years: Club
- Feakle
Club titles
- Clare titles: 1
Inter-county*
Years	County	Apps (scores)
1972-1987	Clare	26 (0-1)
Inter-county titles
- Munster titles: 0
- All-Irelands: 0
- NHL: 2
- All Stars: 2
- *Inter County team apps and scores correct as of 23:40, 19 February 2014.

Gerard "Ger" Loughnane (born 27 January 1953) is an Irish retired hurler who played as a right wing-back for the Clare senior team.

Born in Feakle, County Clare, Loughnane first played competitive hurling whilst at school in St. Flannan's College. He arrived on the inter-county scene at the age of seventeen when he first joined the Clare minor team, before later moving on to the under-21 side. He made his senior debut during the 1972-73 National Hurling League. Loughnane immediately became a regular member of the starting fifteen, and won two National Hurling League medals. He was a Munster runner-up on five occasions.

As a member of the Munster inter-provincial team at various times throughout his career, Loughnane won three Railway Cup medals. At club level he is a one-time championship medallist with Feakle.

Throughout his career Loughnane made 26 championship appearances. His retirement came following the conclusion of the 1987 championship.

In retirement from playing, Loughnane became involved in team management and coaching. During a six-year term as manager of the Clare senior hurlers, he guided the team to two All-Ireland and three Munster titles. His two-year term in charge of Galway ended without success.

== Biography ==
Ger Loughnane was born in Feakle, County Clare. He was educated at his local national school where he was first introduced to the game of hurling, before later attending St. Flannan's College in Ennis, a virtual academy for young and gifted hurlers. During his tenure at St. Flannan's, Loughnane won a Munster Colleges Under-15 medal, as well as playing on the college teams that lost Dean Ryan Cup and Dr Harty Cup finals. He also played hurling with St. Patrick's College in Dublin, where he trained as a primary school teacher. One of his contemporaries at St. Patrick's was Brian Cody, a future hurling star with Kilkenny and the current manager of the team. Following his graduation, Loughnane returned to County Clare, becoming the principal at St. Aidan's primary school in Shannon from its foundation in 1986 until 2011.

== Playing career ==
=== Colleges ===
As a boarder at St. Flannan's College in Ennis for five years, an experience he detested and described as being "like a jail", Loughnane excelled as a hurler. His sole success was the winning of a Munster under-15 championship medal. He was a Dean Ryan Cup and Harty Cup runner-up.

=== Club ===
Loughnane was in the twilight of his career when he captained the Feakle senior team to their most successful season. Having lost their first championship decider in almost thirty years in 1987, Feakle reached a second successive final the following year. Ruan provided the opposition, however, a 1–17 to 1–10 victory gave Loughnane a championship medal.

He also played with Wolfe Tones, Shannon.

=== Inter-county ===
Loughnane arrived on the inter-county scene as a member of the Clare minor hurling team in 1970. The following year he lined out in his sole Munster decider in that grade, however, Clare endured a 6–13 to 3-5 walloping from Cork.

After progressing onto the under-21 team he faced narrow Munster defeats at the hands of Tipperary in 1972 and Waterford in 1974.

Loughnane made his senior championship debut on 24 June 1973 in a 3–11 to 3-9 Munster semi-final defeat by Limerick.

In 1974 Loughnane lined out in his first Munster decider in the senior grade. A 6–14 to 3-9 trouncing by Limerick was the result on that occasion. In spite of that defeat Loughnane later had the honour of being Clare's very first All-Star recipient.

After facing a fifteen-point defeat by Kilkenny in the league final in 1976, both sides faced each other again at the same stage the following year. A 2–8 to 0–9 victory gave Clare the title and gave Loughnane a National Hurling League medal. Clare later faced Cork in the provincial decider, on a day when armed robbers made away with the takings from the gate of £24,579 during the second half of the game. Clare conceded an early penalty but they fought back to take the lead until a contentious red card for full back Jim Power turned the tide for Cork and they fought on win by 4–15 to 4–10.

Clare retained their league title in 1978, with Loughnane collecting a second winners' medal following a 3–10 to 1–10 defeat of Kilkenny once again. In a repeat of the previous year Clare faced Cork in the subsequent Munster decider. In one of the worst ever provincial deciders and only the second one ever not to produce a goal, Clare were narrowly defeated by 0–13 to 0–11. As the final whistle sounded Loughnane, who had scored the last point of the game, slumped to the ground in frustration and thumped his hurley off the pitch. Once again he was later honoured with a second All-Star.

This defeat demoralized Clare, however, Loughnane lined out in a fourth Munster decider in 1981. A 3–12 to 2–9 defeat by Limerick was the result on that occasion.

In 1986 Loughnane's played in a fifth and final provincial decider. Victory eluded him for the fifth time, as Cork secured a 2–18 to 3–12 victory.

Loughnane retired from inter-county hurling following Clare's exit from the 1988 championship.

=== Inter-provincial ===
In 1975, Loughnane was chosen on the Munster inter-provincial team for the very first time. In spite of a narrow one-point defeat by Leinster in the decider, it was the first of seven successive seasons of Loughnane being picked for inter-provincial duty.

The following year, Loughnane was dropped from the starting fifteen, however he was introduced as a substitute in the decider against Leinster. A narrow 4–9 to 4–8 victory gave Munster the title, and gave Loughnane a first Railway Cup medal.

Munster lost the following year; however, Loughnane was back on the starting fifteen in 1978. A 0–20 to 1–11 defeat of Connacht secured a second Railway Cup medal for Loughnane.

Munster faced defeat at the hands of a resurgent Connacht over the next two years; however, the team bounced back in 1981. Loughnane was at right corner-back as Munster trounced archrivals Leinster by 2–16 to 2–6.

== Management career ==
Ger Loughnane
Sport
Inter-county management
- Years: Team
- 1994-2000 2006-2008: Clare; Galway
Inter-county titles as manager
County	League	Province	All-Ireland
Clare Galway	2; 0	3; 0	3; 0

=== Managing Clare ===
Although Loughnane was noted as a great hurler in a county that was starved of success, it is for his exploits as manager of the Clare senior hurlers in the 1990s that he is best known. His managerial career began in the early 1990s when he became a selector on the Clare senior hurling team under Len Gaynor. He was later dropped after a heavy defeat, serving as manager of the Clare under-21 team in the intervening period, but returned as a senior selector in 1993. When Gaynor stepped down in 1994 Loughnane immediately became manager and was charged with preparing the team for the 1995 championship. His training sessions became infamous among players for their intensity and he made sweeping changes throughout the team.

After a winter of intense training, Loughnane's side reached the final of the National Hurling League. Kilkenny hammered Clare on that occasion. Loughnane was particularly annoyed when he saw one of the Kilkenny players putting the winning trophy into the boot of his car. In spite of this Loughnane still predicted that his side would win the provincial championship. Clare defeated Cork in the Munster semi-final and qualified for a final appearance against Limerick. Clare had lost the last two Munster finals, however, on this occasion Loughnane's side hurled Limerick off their feet and captured a 1–17 to 0–11 victory. It was the county's first provincial title since 1932. Clare celebrated and even took the provincial trophy on a tour of the county, however, they were given little chance against Galway in the All-Ireland semi-final. In the end the 3–12 to 1–13 victory was an easy one and Clare qualified to play reigning champions Offaly in the 1995 All-Ireland final. At half-time, in spite of conceding a goal, an animated Loughnane did a brief interview in which he confidently predicted "We're going to do it," before rushing off. His prediction came through and Clare were the All-Ireland champions for the first time in 81 years.

Clare surrendered their Munster and All-Ireland titles in their opening game in 1996. In a game against Limerick, Ciarán Carey scored the winning point after soloing the sliothar for 70 yards.

After an early defeat in 1996, Clare were out for victory in 1997. Once again they defeated Cork in a Munster semi-final before taking the scalp of Tipperary in the Munster final. The score line of 1–18 to 0-18 made them firm favourites to capture a second All-Ireland title. The subsequent All-Ireland semi-final saw Loughnane's side take on Kilkenny. Clare were on top for the entire game and ended up winning on a score line of 1–17 to 1–13. In the first year of the so-called 'back-door system' Tipperary had qualified for an historic All-Ireland final against Clare. It was the first all-Munster All-Ireland final. In what has been described as one of the games of the decade Clare came from behind at half-time to defeat Tipp for the second time that year with a score of 0–20 to 2–13. It was Loughnane's second All-Ireland title as manager. Furthermore, Clare had defeated the big three of Cork, Kilkenny and Tipperary on the way to the All-Ireland title. Only Waterford in 1959 had achieved that feat before.

The 1998 championship was to prove controversial for Loughnane and his Clare team. The replayed Munster final against Waterford was played in an extremely poor spirit with Colin Lynch of Clare and Michael White of Waterford being sent-off after a huge melee. Lynch received a three-month ban for his part in the game and Loughnane was disgusted at the decision. In spite of that Clare captured a third Munster title in four years. The subsequent All-Ireland semi-final saw Clare draw with Offaly. More controversy was to follow when Clare played Offaly in the semi-final replay. Clare were winning by two points when the referee, Jimmy Cooney, blew the whistle with two minutes of normal time left to be played. The Offaly fans were outraged and staged a sit-down protest on the pitch. The result wasn't allowed to stand and Clare were forced to meet Offaly for a third time that year. They lost the second replay, however, it has been said that if they won they would have captured a second All-Ireland title in-a-row. 1998 marked the end of the success for Loughnane's Clare side.

In 1999 Clare reached a sixth Munster final in seven years, however, in spite of aiming to retain their title a young Cork team caught Loughnane's side off guard and defeated the most dominant team in the provincial championship. Clare later drew with Galway in the All-Ireland quarter-final, however, they overcame the men from the West in the replay. Kilkenny provided the opposition in the subsequent All-Ireland semi-final, however, 'the Cats', under new manager Brian Cody, defeated Clare by 0–19 to 0–16.

Loughnane decided to remain in charge for one more season to see if he could gain revenge. The plan came unstuck in the Munster semi-final when Clare suffered a particularly heavy defeat by Tipperary. Loughnane resigned as manager of Clare shortly afterwards.

=== Managing Galway ===
In September 2006, the Galway senior hurling team, devoid of a manager after the resignation of Conor Hayes, issued a press release indicating their desire for Loughnane to take the vacant managerial position. Although he had already stated his disinterest in the position, he remained the favourite candidate to succeed Hayes, before Loughnane himself withdrew for the contest. In true Loughnane fashion, however, he re-entered the managerial race again and was named successor to Hayes. After stating in 2000 that he would never take charge of an inter-county team again Loughnane was back.

Loughnane's first game in charge saw Galway take on Laois in the first-round of the qualifiers on 30 June 2007. A comprehensive 3–20 to 1–14 victory gave Loughnane hope for his next game against his own-native county of Clare. The game, which took on a derby-type feel to it, was an exciting and close one, however, victory went to the Claremen. The final whistle saw scenes resembling that of an All-Ireland final win with hundreds of Clare supporters bursting onto the pitch. A huge victory over Antrim allowed Loughnnane's team advance to an All-Ireland quarter-final meeting with Kilkenny. This would be the first meeting of Loughnane and Brian Cody, two of the greatest managers of the modern era. For sixty minutes both sides were neck and neck with no team taking too much of a lead. On several occasion it looked as if Galway might pull away and win the game, however, Kilkenny's Eddie Brennan scored two goals in the last ten minutes to give Kilkenny a 3–22 to 1–18 victory. Following the game Loughnane entered into a war of words with Brian Cody after the former accused Kilkenny of striking late with the hurley and then referees letting them away with it.

When Loughnane took the Galway job he famously promised to quit if he failed to deliver the All-Ireland within two years. Galway had gone unbeaten in the National Hurling League and pipped Tipperary to a semi-final spot. Galway defeated Cork in this game, resulting in a league final showdown with Tipperary. The team has been a lot more settled compared to this time last year especially in the area of defence which is considered Galway's greatest weakness. Loughnane himself has adopted a much lower media profile with less of his trademark outbursts and wasn't even present for the launch of the National Hurling League. His side went out of the All-Ireland in the qualifiers after failing to beat Cork in July 2008. Following a county board meeting on 19 August 2008 Loughnane agreed to stay on for one more year as Galway manager. This decision resulted in some players expressing unease about his style and tactics. Amid accusations of 'player power', Loughnane was voted out of the job in October 2008.

=== Managing St Aidan's National School ===
Loughnane enjoyed considerable success as manager of St Aidan's hurling team. In 2004 Loughnane lead the team to their first Division one Cumann na mBunscol title.

== Media involvement ==
Loughnane spent a number of years as a hurling analyst in the media. He wrote a column in The Star newspaper and regularly appeared as a pundit on RTÉ's The Sunday Game. In this capacity he earned a reputation as an outspoken critic of many hurling teams, including Clare.

== Personal life and health ==
In June 2011 Loughnane was diagnosed with leukemia. It was falsely reported on 28 July 2011 that Loughnane had died. The news had spread over a number of social networking sites although it was quickly exposed as a hoax.

== Honours ==
=== Player ===
St. Flannan's College

- Munster Colleges Under-15 Hurling Championship (1): 1968

Feakle

- Clare Senior Hurling Championship (1): 1988 (c)
- Clare Intermediate Hurling Championship (1): 1973

Clare

- National Hurling League (2): 1976-77, 1977-78

Munster

- Railway Cup (1): 1976, 1978, 1981

=== Individual ===
Honours

- All-Star (2): 1974, 1978

=== Manager ===
Clare

- All-Ireland Senior Hurling Championship (2): 1995, 1997
- Munster Senior Hurling Championship (3): 1995, 1997, 1998

Sporting positions
Preceded by John Minogue	Clare Senior Hurling Captain; 1984	Succeeded by Seán Stack
Preceded by Len Gaynor	Clare Senior Hurling Manager; 1994–2000	Succeeded by Cyril Lyons
Preceded by Conor Hayes	Galway Senior Hurling Manager; 2006–2008	Succeeded by John McIntyre
Achievements
Preceded by Éamonn Cregan (Offaly)	All-Ireland Senior Hurling Final winning manager 1995	Succeeded by Liam Griffin (Wexford)
Preceded by Liam Griffin (Wexford)	All-Ireland Senior Hurling Final winning manager 1997	Succeeded by Michael Bond (Offaly)
