= 1997 All-Ireland Senior Hurling Championship =

Championship details
- Dates: 18 May – 14 September 1997
- Teams: 18

All-Ireland champions
- Winning team: Clare (3rd win)
- Captain: Anthony Daly
- Manager: Ger Loughnane

All-Ireland Finalists
- Losing team: Tipperary
- Captain: Conor Gleeson
- Manager: Len Gaynor

Provincial champions
- Munster: Clare
- Leinster: Wexford
- Ulster: Down
- Connacht: Galway

Championship statistics
- No. matches played: 19
- Top Scorer: D. J. Carey (4–22)
- Player of the Year: Jamesie O'Connor
- All-Star Team: See here

The All-Ireland Senior Hurling Championship of 1997 (known for sponsorship reasons as the Guinness Hurling Championship 1997) was the 111th staging of Ireland's premier hurling competition. Clare won the championship, beating Tipperary 0–20 to 2–13 in the final at Croke Park, Dublin.

== Pre-championship ==
=== The 'back-door' system ===
Since its inception in 1887 the championship had been played on a straight knock-out basis. If any team was defeated at any stage of the provincial or All-Ireland competitions it meant automatic elimination. This system was deemed the fairest as the All-Ireland champions would always be the team who won all of their games. There were some problems with this system. Over the years Galway had become the only credible hurling team in Connacht, thus giving them an automatic pass into the All-Ireland semi-finals every year. Similarly in Ulster there were many problems as hurling was much weaker and confined to a small few counties in the north-east of the province.

In 1995 the Hurling Development Committee began investigating a way of improving hurling in general and revamping the championship. Their proposals involved allowing the defeated Munster and Leinster finalists to re-enter the All-Ireland championship. Although the two provincial final winners would automatically qualify for the All-Ireland semi-finals the two defeated provincial teams would join Galway and the Ulster champions in two play-off games or 'quarter-finals'. The two winners from these two games would then qualify for the semi-finals where they would be drawn against the Leinster and Munster champions. Repeat games would be avoided in the All-Ireland semi-final stage.

At the start of 1996 these proposals looked unlikely of being introduced, however, a whistle-stop tour undertaken by the committee's secretary Frank Murphy and Pat Daly, the GAA's Games Development Officer, had changed the position. In April 1996 the committee's proposals were accepted at the GAA's annual congress. Most counties supported the new proposals and motion 15 (a) was passed with more than a two-thirds majority.

=== Betting ===
Prior to the opening of the championship former All-Ireland-winning manager Éamonn Cregan gave his predictions for the upcoming championship in the Irish Times. As with the previous three championships the field was wide open. Although they were the reigning champions, Wexford were given little chance of making it two-in-a-row. The departure of manager Liam Griffin and the sheer exertion of winning the previous years' title meant that Wexford's hurlers, it seemed, had reached their peak. Wexford's greatest rivals, Kilkenny, were tipped for success. Having failed to land the provincial title since 1993, former player and current manager Nickey Brennan seemed to have reignited the hunger. Offaly, a team that had reached two out of the last three championship deciders, were regarded as being up there with Kilkenny. One problem was the age profile of some of the team's players, while a lack of strength in depth on the bench also militated against Offaly's chances. The return of Cyril Farrell as manager of the Galway team seemed to give the team a boost. Farrell guided his native county to three All-Ireland titles in the 1980s and seemed to be blessed with a very strong panel at the start of his third stint as manager. Limerick, the All-Ireland runners-up of the previous year, were again touted as a team that could make the big breakthrough. Two All-Ireland final defeats in three years, however, lead some commentators to question the mental toughness of the team. Clare, the surprise champions of two years earlier, seemed to be in decline and were seen as having reached their zenith in 1995. Tipperary, however, were viewed as the dark horses of the championship. Although the 'big three' were in decline for a number of years, a resurgent John Leahy seemed to give Tipp a half-chance of landing the championship title.

== Team changes ==
=== To Championship ===
Promoted from the All-Ireland Intermediate Hurling Championship

- None

=== From Championship ===
Regraded to the All-Ireland Intermediate Hurling Championship

- Carlow
- London

Withdrew from Championship

- New York

== The championship ==
=== Participating counties ===
Province	County	Manager(s)	Most recent success	
Province	County	Manager(s)	All-Ireland	Provincial
Leinster	Dublin	Michael O'Grady	1938	1961
	Kilkenny	Nickey Brennan	1993	1993
	Laois	Michael 'Babs' Keating	1915	1949
	Meath	Tom Ryan		
	Offaly	John McIntyre	1994	1995
	Westmeath	John Davis		
	Wexford	Rory Kinsella	1996	1996
Munster	Clare	Ger Loughnane	1995	1995
	Cork	Jimmy Barry-Murphy	1990	1992
	Kerry	John Meyler	1891	1891
	Limerick	Tom Ryan	1973	1994
	Tipperary	Len Gaynor	1991	1993
	Waterford	Gerald McCarthy	1959	1963
Connacht	Galway	Cyril Farrell	1988	1996
	Roscommon	Michael Kelly		1913
Ulster	Antrim	Dominic McKinley		1996
	Derry	Hugo Mac Oscair		
	Down	P. Braniff; B. Gilmore; G. Lennon		1995

=== Format ===
==== Connacht Championship ====
Final: (1 match) This is a lone match between the two competing Connacht teams. One team is eliminated at this stage, while the winners advance to the All-Ireland quarter-final where the play the Leinster runners-up.

==== Leinster Championship ====
Preliminary Round: (1 match) This is a single match between the first two teams drawn from the province of Leinster. One team is eliminated at this stage, while the winners advance to the quarter-finals.

Quarter-finals: (2 matches) The winner of the preliminary round game joins three other Leinster teams to make up the two quarter-final pairings. Two teams are eliminated at this stage, while two teams advance to the Leinster semi-finals.

Semi-finals: (2 matches) The winners of the two quarter-finals join two other Leinster teams to make up the semi-final pairings. Two teams are eliminated at this stage, while two teams advance to the Leinster final.

Final: (1 match) The winners of the two semi-finals contest this game. The winners advance to the All-Ireland semi-final while the runners-up advance to the All-Ireland quarter-final.

==== Munster Championship ====
Quarter-final: (2 matches) These are two lone matches between the first four teams drawn from the province of Munster. Two teams are eliminated at this stage, while two teams advance to the semi-finals.

Semi-finals: (2 matches) The winners of the two quarter-finals join the other two Munster teams to make up the semi-final pairings. Two teams are eliminated at this stage, while two teams advance to the final.

Final: (1 match) The winners of the two semi-finals contest this game. The winners advance to the All-Ireland semi-final while the runners-up advance to the All-Ireland quarter-final.

==== Ulster Championship ====
Semi-final: (1 match) This is a single match between the first two teams drawn from the province of Ulster. One team is eliminated at this stage, while the winners advance to the final.

Final: (1 match) The winner of the semi-final joins another Ulster team to contest this game. One team is eliminated at this stage, while the winners advance to the All-Ireland quarter-final where that play the Munster runners-up.

==== All-Ireland Championship ====
Quarter-finals: (2 matches) These are two lone matches between the Connacht champions and the Leinster runners-up, and the Ulster champions and the Munster runners-up. Two teams are eliminated at this stage, while the winners advance to the All-Ireland semi-finals.

Semi-finals: (2 matches) The Munster and Leinster champions play the winners of the two quarter-finals. Two teams are eliminated at this stage, while the two winners advance to the All-Ireland final.

Final: (1 match) The two semi-final winners contest the final.

== Ulster Senior Hurling Championship ==
=== Bracket ===
Semi-finals		Final
		Antrim	0–19
Down	1–15	Down	3–14
Derry	1–10

=== Semi-finals ===
June 22
Semi-Final

Down	1–15 – 1–10	Derry
M. Coulter (1–2), T. Coulter (0–3), J. McGrattan (0–3), M. Baillie (0–2), N. Sands (0–2), G. Savage (0–1), B. Coulter (0–1), G. McGrattan (0–1).		D. Kelly (0–6), M. Collins (1–2), J. Dwyer (0–2).

Casement Park, Belfast
Attendance: T. McIntyre
Referee: 1,500

=== Ulster Final ===
July 6
Final

Antrim	0–19 – 3–14	Down
J. Carson (0–13), G. O'Kane (0–2), C. McCambridge (0–1), A. Mort (0–1), A. Elliott (0–1), A. Delargy (0–1).		N. Sands (1–9), G. McGrattan (1–3), M. Coulter (1–0), M. Mallon (0–1), G. Savage (0–1).

Casement Park, Belfast
Referee: P. Horan (Offaly)

== Connacht Senior Hurling Championship ==
July 13
Final

Roscommon	0–5 – 6–24	Galway
C. Kelly (0–2), B. Boyle (0–2), R. Mulry (0–1).		A. Kerins (3–2), E. Cloonan (1–7), F. Forde (1–2), J. Rabbitte (1–1), J. Campbell (0–4), J. McGrath (0–4), V. Maher (0–2), K. Broderick (0–1), D. Coen (0–1).

Athleague
Attendance: 2,500
Referee: P. O'Connor (Limerick)

== Leinster Senior Hurling Championship ==
=== Bracket ===
Preliminary round
Offaly	3–20
Meath	0–08

Quarter-finals
Westmeath	2–08
Dublin	5–15
Laois	2–07
Offaly	1–11

Semi-finals
Kilkenny	2–20
Dublin	2–13
Wexford	3–12
Offaly	2–12

Leinster Final
Kilkenny	1–11
Wexford	2–14

=== Preliminary round ===
May 18
Preliminary Round

Offaly	3–20 – 0–8	Meath
Johnny Dooley (1–9), Joe Dooley (1–2), K. Farrell (0–4), G. Cahill (1–0), B. Dooley (0–2), J. Pilkington (0–2), P. Mulhaire (0–1).		P. Potterton (0–4), M. Cole (0–2), M. Massey (0–1), B. Murray (0–1).

Cusack Park, Mullingar
Attendance: 4,500
Referee: P. Neary (Kilkenny)

May 18
Quarter-Final

Westmeath	2–8 – 5–15	Dublin
S. McLoughlin (1–3), P. Clarke (1–0), R. Galvin (0–2), D. Gallagher (0–1), B. Kennedy (0–1), P. Connaughton (0–1).		G. Ennis (3–2), E. Morrissey (1–3), J. Brennan (0–6), B. McMahon (1–0), L. Walsh (0–1), C. McCann (0–1), S. Perkins (0–1), S. Dalton (0–1).

Cusack Park, Mullingar
Attendance: 4,500
Referee: P. Dunphy (Kilkenny)

June 8
Quarter-Final

Offaly	1–11 – 2–7	Laois
Johnny Dooley (0–5), J. Errity (1–0), M. Duignan (0–2), Joe Dooley (0–2), J. Pilkington (0–1), G. Cahill (0–1).		P. J. Peacock (1–2), O. Coss (1–0), J. Dollard (0–2), B. Maher (0–1), S. Cuddy (0–1), T. Dunne (0–1).

Croke Park, Dublin
Attendance: 25,211
Referee: D. Murphy (Wexford)

June 22
Semi-Final

Kilkenny	2–20 – 2–13	Dublin
D. J. Carey (1–7), P. J. Delaney (1–0), C. Carter (0–3), J. Costelloe (0–3), P. Larkin (0–2), A. Comerford (0–2), P. Barry (0–1), M. Phelan (0–1), N. Maloney (0–1).		J. Brennan (1–8), G. Ennis (1–0), E. Morrissey (0–3), C. McCann (0–2).

Croke Park, Dublin
Attendance: 52,079
Referee: P. Aherne (Carlow)

June 22
Semi-Final

Wexford	3–12 – 2–12	Offaly
G. Laffan (2–0), M. Storey (0–4), T. Dempsey (0–4), L. Dunne (1–0), L. Murphy (0–2), P. Codd (0–1), R. McCarthy (0–1).		Johnny Dooley (0–7), J. Pilkington (1–1), B. Dooley (1–0), M. Duignan (0–2), G. Oakley (0–1), C. Cassidy (0–1).

Croke Park, Dublin
Attendance: 52,079
Referee: A. Mac Suibhne (Dublin)

July 13
Final

Wexford	2–14 – 1–11	Kilkenny
B. Byrne (1–2), T. Dempsey (1–1), R. McCarthy (0–4), P. Codd (0–3), G. Laffan (0–2), M. Storey (0–1), L. Murphy (0–1).		P. J. Delaney (1–1), C. Carter (0–3), P. Barry (0–3), D. J. Carey (0–1), P. Larkin (0–1), N. Maloney (0–1), A. Comerford (0–1).

Croke Park, Dublin
Attendance: 55,492
Referee: A. Mac Suibhne (Dublin)

== Munster Senior Hurling Championship ==
=== Bracket ===
Quarter-finals
Clare	3–24
Kerry	1–06
Limerick	2–20
Waterford	1–17

Semi-finals
Cork	0–18
Clare	1–19
Tipperary	1–20
Limerick	0–13

All-Ireland final
Clare	1–18
Tipperary	0–18

=== Quarter-finals ===
May 18
Quarter-Final

Clare	3–24 – 1–6	Kerry
P. J. O'Connell (2–2), J. O'Connor (0–6), N. Gilligan (0–5), C. Clancy (1–2), S. McMahon (0–3), F. Tuohy (0–2), G. O'Loughlin (0–2), B. Murphy (0–1), D. Forde (0–1).		J. O'Sullivan (1–0), M. Slattery (0–2), I. Maunsell (0–1), B. O'Mahony (0–1), T. J. Curran (0–1), C. Walsh (0–1).

Cusack Park, Ennis
Attendance: 8,500
Referee: V. Wadding (Laois)

May 25
Quarter-Final

Limerick	2–20 – 1–17	Waterford
B. Foley (2–1), G. Kirby (0–6), M. Galligan (0–4), S. O'Neill (0–4), J. Moran (0–3), T. J. Ryan (0–2).		P. Flynn (1–7), B. O'Sullivan (0–4), T. Browne (0–3), K. McGrath (0–2), D. Bennett (0–1).

Semple Stadium, Thurles
Attendance: 22,105
Referee: S. McMahon (Clare)

=== Semi-finals ===
June 8
Semi-Final

Clare	1–19 – 0–18	Cork
J. O'Connor (0–6), S. McNamara (1–0), G. O'Loughlin (0–3), S. McMahon (0–3), F. Tuohy (0–2), C. Lynch (0–2), A. Daly (0–1), C. Clancy (0–1), D. Forde (0–1).		G. Manley (0–6), S. McGrath (0–5), B. Egan (0–2), A. Browne (0–2), J. Deane (0–2), A. Cummins (0–1).

Gaelic Grounds, Limerick
Attendance: 23,105
Referee: P. O'Connor (Limerick)

June 15
Semi-Final

Tipperary	1–20 – 0–13	Limerick
M. Cleary (1–3), T. Dunne (0–5), K. Tucker (0–3), D. Ryan (0–3), J. Leahy (0–3), L. Cahill (0–2), P. O'Dwyer (0–1).		G. Kirby (0–4), M. Houlihan (0–2), M. Galligan (0–2), D. Clerkin (0–1), M. Foley (0–1), J. Moran (0–1), B. Foley (0–1), T. J. Ryan (0–1).

Semple Stadium, Thurles
Attendance: 49,165
Referee: D. Murphy (Wexford)

=== Final ===
July 6
Final

Clare	1–18 – 0–18	Tipperary
J. O'Connor (0–5), D. Forde (1–1), G. O'Loughlin (0–3), S. McMahon (0–3), P. J. O'Connell (0–2), C. Lynch (0–1), F. Tuohy (0–1), S. McNamara (0–1), B. Murphy (0–1).		T. Dunne (0–7), D. Ryan (0–4), K. Tucker (0–3), J. Leahy (0–3), M. Cleary (0–1).

Páirc Uí Chaoimh, Cork
Attendance: 43,560
Referee: P. O'Connor (Limerick)

== All-Ireland Senior Hurling Championship ==
=== Bracket ===
Quarter-finals
Down	3–08
Tipperary	3–24
Galway	3–16
Kilkenny	4–15

Semi-finals
Wexford	0–15
Tipperary	2–16
Clare	1–17
Kilkenny	1–13

All-Ireland final
Tipperary	2–13
Clare	0–20

=== Quarter-finals ===
July 26
Quarter-Final

Tipperary	3–24 – 3–8	Down
J. Leahy (0–8), A. Ryan (1–2), T. Dunne (0–5), A. Flanagan (1–1), E. O'Neill (1–0), L. McGrath (0–3), B. O'Meara (0–3), L. Cahill (0–1), K. Tucker (0–1).		N. Sands (1–4), G. McGrattan (1–1), B. Coulter (1–0), G. Savage (0–2), M. Braniff (0–1).

St. Tiernach's Park, Clones
Attendance: 5,726
Referee: D. Murphy (Wexford)

July 27
Quarter-Final

Kilkenny	4–15 – 3–16	Galway
D. J. Carey (2–8), M. Phelan (1–1), K. O'Shea (1–0), A. Comerford (0–3), C. Brennan (0–2), C. Carter (0–1).	Report	K. Broderick (1–4), E. Cloonan (0–4), L. Burke (1–0), J. Cooney (1–0), J. Campbell (0–3), F. Forde (0–3), C. Moore (0–1), A. Kerins (0–1).

Semple Stadium, Thurles
Attendance: 22,826
Referee: P. O'Connor (Limerick)

=== Semi-finals ===
August 10
Semi-Final

Clare	1–17 – 1–13	Kilkenny
J. O'Connor (0–9), G. O'Loughlin (1–1), P. O'Connell (0–2), N. Gilligan (0–2), S. McMahon (0–2), D. Forde (0–1).		D. J. Carey (1–6), C. Carter (0–2), P. Barry (0–2), D. BYrne (0–1), P. Larkin (0–1), P. O'Neill (0–1).

Croke Park, Dublin
Attendance: 47,961
Referee: D. Murphy (Wexford)

August 17
Semi-Final

Tipperary	2–16 – 0–15	Wexford
J. Leahy (1–4), B. O'Meara (1–1), T. Dunne (0–4), M. Cleary (0–3), D. Ryan (0–1), L. Cahill (0–1), C. Gleeson (0–1), L. McGrath (0–1).		P. Codd (0–8), M. Storey (0–3), T. Dempsey (0–1), M. Jordan (0–1), L. Murphy (0–1), L. Dunne (0–1).

Croke Park, Dublin
Attendance: 62,142
Referee: J. O'Leary (Cork)

=== All-Ireland final ===
September 14
Final

Clare	0–20 – 2–13	Tipperary
J. O'Connor (0–7), N. Gilligan (0–3), O. Baker (0–2), C. Lynch (0–2), D. Forde (0–2), S. McMahon (0–1), G. O'Loughlin (0–1), C. Clancy (0–1), L. Doyle (0–1).		T. Dunne (0–5), E. O'Neill (1–1), J. Leahy (0–4), L. Cahill (1–0), M. Cleary (0–1), C. Gleeson (0–1), B. O'Meara (0–1).

Croke Park, Dublin
Attendance: 65,575
Referee: D. Murphy (Wexford)

Clare	Tipperary

== Championship statistics ==
=== Scoring ===
- First goal of the championship: Eamon Morrissey for Dublin against Westmeath (Leinster quarter-final)
- Last goal of the championship: Eugene O'Neill for Tipperary against Clare (All-Ireland final)
- Hat-trick heroes:
  - First hat-trick of the championship: Ger Ennis for Dublin against Westmeath (Leinster quarter-final)
  - Second hat-trick of the championship: Alan Kerins for Galway against Roscommon (Connacht final)
- Widest winning margin: 37 points
  - Galway 6–24 : 0–5 Roscommon (Connacht final)
- Most goals in a match: 7
  - Dublin 5–15 : 2–8 Westmeath (Leinster quarter-final)
  - Kilkenny 4–15 : 3–16 Galway (All-Ireland quarter-final)
- Most points in a match: 37
  - Limerick 2–20 : 1–17 Waterford (Munster quarter-final)
  - Clare 1–19 : 0–18 Cork (Munster semi-final)
- Most goals by one team in a match: 6
  - Galway 6–24 : 0–5 Roscommon (Connacht final)
- Most goals scored by a losing team: 3
  - Galway 3–16 : 4–15 Kilkenny (All-Ireland quarter-final)
  - Down 3–8 : 3–24 Tipperary (All-Ireland quarter-final)
- Most points scored by a losing team: 18
  - Cork 0–18 : 1–19 Clare(Munster semi-final)
  - Tipperary 0–18 : 1–18 Clare(Munster final)

=== Discipline ===
- First yellow card of the championship: Alfie Devine for Westmeath against Dublin (Leinster quarter-final)
- Last yellow card of the championship: Brian O'Meara for Tipperary against Clare (All-Ireland final)

=== Top scorers ===
==== Season ====
Rank	Player	County	Tally	Total	Matches	Average
1	D. J. Carey	Kilkenny	4–22	34	4	8.50
2	Jamesie O'Connor	Clare	0–33	33	5	6.60
3	Tommy Dunne	Tipperary	0–30	30	5	6.00
4	John Leahy	Tipperary	1–22	25	5	5.00
5	Johnny Dooley	Offaly	1–21	24	3	8.00
6	Noel Sands	Down	2–15	21	3	7.00
7	Jamesie Brennan	Dublin	1–14	17	2	8.50
8	Ger Ennis	Dublin	4–2	14	2	7.00
8	Eugene Cloonan	Galway	1–11	14	2	7.00
10	Ger O'Loughlin	Clare	1–10	13	5	2.60
10	Jackie Carson	Antrim	0–13	13	1	13.00

==== Single game ====
Rank	Player	County	Tally	Total	Opposition
1	D. J. Carey	Kilkenny	2–8	14	Galway
2	Jackie Carson	Antrim	0–13	13	Down
3	Noel Sands	Down	1–9	12	Antrim
3	Johnny Dooley	Offaly	1–9	12	Meath
5	Ger Ennis	Dublin	3–2	11	Westmeath
5	Alan Kerins	Galway	3–2	11	Roscommon
5	Jamesie Brennan	Dublin	1–8	11	Kilkenny
8	Eugene Cloonan	Galway	1–7	10	Roscommon
8	D. J. Carey	Kilkenny	1–7	10	Dublin
8	Paul Flynn	Waterford	1–7	10	Limerick

== Miscellaneous ==
- The meeting of Clare and Tipperary in the All-Ireland final was the first time that two teams from the same province met in the championship decider.

== See also ==
- 1997 All-Ireland Intermediate Hurling Championship
