= 1992–93 National Hurling League =

62nd season of the National Hurling League

League details
- Dates: 18 October 1992 – 22 May 1993

League champions
- Winners: Cork (13th win)
- Captain: Brian Corcoran

League runners-up
- Runners-up: Wexford
- Captain: Tom Dempsey

Other division winners
- Division 2: Laois
- Division 3: Roscommon

The 1992–93 National Hurling League, known for sponsorship reasons as the Royal Liver Assurance National Hurling League, was the 62nd staging of the National Hurling League. Cork won the league, beating Wexford by 3–11 to 1–12 after two replays of the final.

== Format ==
There are 12 teams in Division 1, divided into two groups. There are 8 teams in Division 2. Each team plays all the teams in its group once, earning 2 points for a win and 1 for a draw.

Eight teams progress to the NHL quarter-finals:

- The top three in Division 1A
- The top three in Division 1B
- The top two in Division 2

== Division 1 ==
National Hurling League Division 1
- Season: 1992-93
- Champions: Cork; 13th National League title Captain: Brian Corcoran; Manager: Michael O'Brien
- Matches: 43
- Top goalscorer: Barry Egan
- Biggest home win: Dublin 2-16 - 1-8 Cork (25 October 1992)
- Biggest away win: Cork 5-16 - 1-6 Waterford (4 April 1993)
- Highest scoring: Dublin 2-17 - 1-24 Waterford (28 March 1993)
- All statistics correct as of 18 January 2017.

Limerick came into the season as defending champions of the 1991-92 season. On 22 May 1993, Cork won the title following a 3-11 to 1-12 win over Wexford in the final. It was their first league title since 1980-81 and their 13th National League title overall. Cork's Barry Egan was the Division 1 top scorer.

=== Division 1A table ===
National Hurling League Quarter-Finals

National Hurling League Quarter-Final Play-offs (tied on points)

Pos	Team	Pld	W	D	L	Pts
1	Tipperary	5	4	0	1	8
2	Down	5	3	0	2	6
3	Limerick	5	2	1	2	5
4	Antrim	5	2	1	2	5
5	Kilkenny	5	2	0	3	4
6	Offaly	5	0	0	5	0

- Limerick are placed third after winning playoff.

=== Group stage ===
25 October 1992	Tipperary	0-15 - 1-10	Limerick	Semple Stadium, Thurles
	M Cleary 0-8, Dinny Ryan 0-3, N English 0-2, J Leahy 0-1, D Ryan 0-1.		G Kirby 0-6, D Flynn 1-0, A Garvey 0-2, PJ Garvey 0-1, M Houlihan 0-1.	Referee: J Guinan (Kilkenny)

25 October 1992	Down	4-7 - 2-7	Offaly	McKenna Park, Ballycran
	M Bailie 2-1, N Sands 1-1, P Savage 1-0, C Mageean 0-2, G Savage 0-1, J McCrickard 0-1, K Coulter 0-1.		P Corrigan 1-4, N Hands 1-1, J Rigney 0-1, T Dooley 0-1.	Referee: A Mac Suibhne (Dublin)

25 October 1992	Antrim	1-14 - 0-9	Kilkenny	Casement Park, Belfast
	P Walsh 0-5, B Gillen 1-0, A Elliott 0-3, P McKillen 0-2, K Barr 0-2, J Close 0-1, P Jennings 0-1.		D Lawlor 0-3, J Brennan 0-3, J Power 0-1, PJ Delaney 0-1, M Phelan 0-1.	Referee: P Delaney (Laois)

8 November 1992	Limerick	0-14 - 0-11	Down	Gaelic Grounds, Limerick
	G Kirby 0-6, F Carroll 0-2, A Carmody 0-2, A Garvey 0-2, PJ Garvey 0-1, P O'Neill 0-1.		C Mageean 0-3, D Hughes 0-2, M Baillie 0-2, G Savage 0-1, N Sands 0-1, K Coulter 0-1, M Blaney 0-1.	Referee: M Darcy (Galway)

8 November 1992	Offaly	1-9 - 0-14	Antrim	St. Brendan's Park, Birr
	Johnny Dooley 0-4, J Rigney 1-0, P Corrigan 0-2, B Dooley 0-2, D Pilkington 0-1.		P McKillen 0-4, A Elliott 0-3, J Close 0-2, J Carson 0-2, A McCarry 0-1, P Walsh 0-1, P Jennings 0-1.	Referee: T Murray (Limerick)

15 November 1992	Kilkenny	1-9 - 1-10	Tipperary	Nowlan Park, Kilkenny
	R Heffernan 1-1, A Prendergast 0-4, PJ Delaney 0-2, J Brennan 0-1, J Power 0-1.		M Cleary 1-8, A Ryan 0-1, J Leahy 0-1.

22 November 1922	Kilkenny	1-10 - 0-8	Limerick	Nowlan Park, Kilkenny
	A Ronan 1-4, M Phelan 0-2, A Prendergast 0-2, M Walsh 0-1, T Murphy 0-1.		G Kirby 0-4, PG Garvey 0-2, D Flynn 0-1, S O'Neill 0-1.	Referee: G Harringhton (Cork)

22 November 1992	Tipperary	1-15 - 0-7	Offaly	Semple Stadium, Thurles
	M Cleary 1-4, D Ryan 0-3, J Hayes 0-3, S Bohan 0-2, D Carr 0-2, P King 0-1.		Johnny Dooley 0-3, P Corrigan 0-3, Joe Dooley 0-1.	Referee: JM Kelly (Waterford)

22 November 1992	Antrim	3-4 - 3-11	Down	Casement Park, Belfast
	S McMullan 2-0, J Carson 1-3, A Elliott 0-1.		M Blaney 1-1, G Coulter 0-4, N Sands 1-0, C mageean 0-3, M Baillie 0-1, M Braniff 0-1, D Hughes 0-1.

7 March 1993	Limerick	2-9 - 0-15	Antrim	Gaelic Grounds, Limerick
	G Kirby 1-3, S Fitzgibbon 1-1, F Carroll 0-2, M Reale 0-1, G Ryan 0-1, P Heffernan 0-1.		G O'Kane 0-4, T McNaughton 0-3, A Elliott 0-3,	Referee: S McMahon (Clare)

7 March 1993	Down	2-5 - 0-14	Tipperary	McKenna Park, Ballycran
	N Sands 1-0, P Savage 1-0, G McGrattan 0-2, C Mageean 0-1, M Baillie 0-1, D Hughes 0-1.		C Stakelum 0-6, M Cleary 0-6, M O'Meara 0-1, N English 0-1.	Referee: P Ahearne (Carlow)

7 March 1993	Offaly	2-8 - 0-19	Kilkenny	St. Brendan's Park, Birr
	J Troy 2-5, M Duignan 0-1, D Regan 0-1, M Conneely 0-1.		R Heffernan 0-10, M Phelan 0-3, A Prendergast 0-2, PJ Delaney 0-2, L McCarthy 0-1, T Murphy 0-1.	Referee: J Cody (Galway)

21 March 1993	Limerick	3-15 - 3-8	Offaly	Gaelic Grounds, Limerick
	G Kirby 1-6, P Heffernan 1-4, S Fitzgibbon 1-2, F Carroll 0-2, C Carey 0-1.		J Rigney 2-1, G Cahill 1-1, B Whelehan 0-3, P Temple 0-2, Joe Dooley 0-1.	Referee: M Darcy (Galway)

21 March 1993	Tipperary	1-17 - 2-10	Antrim	Semple Stadium, Thurles
	C Stakelum 1-10, S Bohan 0-2, A Ryan 0-2, N English 0-2, Conal Bonnar 0-1.		JP McKillop 2-3, P McKillen 0-3, P Jennings 0-2, J Carson 0-1, G O'Kane 0-1.	Referee: D Murphy (Wexford)

21 March 1993	Kilkenny	1-11 - 1-12	Down	Nowlan Park, Kilkenny
	J Power 1-1, DJ Carey 0-3, J Brennan 0-2, R Heffernan 0-2, PJ Delaney 0-2, M Phelan 0-1.		C Mageean 0-7, M Blaney 1-0, D Hughes 0-2, N Sands 0-1, G Coulter 0-1, G McGrattan 0-1.	Referee: W Horgan (Cork)

=== Division 1B table ===
National Hurling League Quarter-Finals

National Hurling League Quarter-Final Play-offs (tied on points)

Team	Pld	W	D	L	Pts
Wexford	5	3	2	0	8
Galway	5	2	2	1	6
Cork (C)	5	1	2	2	4
Waterford	5	1	2	2	4
Dublin	5	2	0	3	4
Clare	5	2	0	3	4

- Cork are placed third after winning playoffs.

=== Group stage ===
25 October 1992	Clare	2-7 - 2-10	Wexford	Cusack Park, Ennis
	C Lyons 1-3, D Collins 1-1, A Daly 0-1, E Slattery 0-1, J McInerney 0-1.		B Byrne 1-3, A Fenlon 0-4, C McBride 1-0, D Myers 0-2, L Murphy 0-1.	Referee: T Murray (Limerick)

25 October 1992	Dublin	2-16 - 1-8	Cork	Parnell Park, Donnycarney
	B McMahon 2-3, J Murphy 0-7, J Morris 0-3, M Ryan 0-1, J Finnegan 0-1, A O'Grady 0-1.		B Corcoran 1-7, T McCarthy 0-1.	Referee: S Robbins (Down)

8 November 1992	Wexford	1-11 - 1-11	Waterford	O'Kennedy Park, New Ross
	M Storey 0-4, T Dempsey 0-4, C McBride 1-0, L Dunne 0-1, B Byrne 0-1, L Murphy 0-1.		J Brenner 0-8, G Harris 1-0, P Prendergast 0-2, P Coffey 0-1.	Referee: W Horgan (Cork)

8 November 1992	Galway	2-11 - 1-8	Dublin	Ballinasloe Sportsfield, Ballinasloe
	L Burke 0-8, A Cunningham 1-2, J Rabbitte 1-0, C Moran 0-1.		J Murphy 0-4, J Flanagan 1-0, A O'Grady 0-3, B McMahon 0-1.	Referee: K Walsh (Clare)

8 November 1992	Cork	4-12 - 2-9	Clare	Páirc Uí Chaoimh, Cork
	B Egan 1-2, T McCarthy 1-1, M Foley 1-0, G Manley 1-0, S McCarthy 0-3, J Cashman 0-2.		G O'Loughlin 1-1, C lyons 0-4, P O'Rourke 1-0, D Cleary 0-2, M Daffy 0-1, J Chaplin 0-1.	Referee: P Delaney (Laois)

22 November 1992	Wexford	1-10 - 1-10	Galway	Wexford Park, Wexford
	E Scallan 0-5, B Byrne 1-0, J Bolger 0-2, E Cleary 0-2, S White 0-1.		P Kelly 1-2, J Cooney 0-5, C Moran 0-1, J Campbell 0-1, A Cunningham 0-1.	Referee: J McDonnell (Tipperary)

22 November 1992	Waterford	1-12 - 2-9	Cork	Fraher Field, Dungarvan
	S Daly 1-1, J Brenner 0-3, L O'Connor 0-3, T Fives 0-2, B O'Sullivan 0-2, P Prendergast 0-1.		T McCarthy 1-2, P O'Callaghan 1-0, C Casey 0-2, J Corcoran 0-2, S McCarthy 0-2, B Egan 0-1.	Referee: T Murray (Limerick)

22 November 1992	Clare	2-14 - 1-10	Dublin	Dr. Daly Park, Tulla
	C Lyons 1-4, G O'Loughlin 1-1, P O'Rourke 0-3, E Cleary 0-2, M McNamara 0-1, J O'Connor 0-1, E Slattery 0-1, P Markham 0-1.		A O'Grady 0-7, B Kelleher 1-0, B McMahon 0-2, M Ryan 0-1.	Referee: M Darcy (Galway)

29 November 1992	Waterford	0-10 - 0-5	Galway	Walsh Park, Waterford
	J Brenner 0-5, T Browne 0-2, N Crowley 0-1, B Greene 0-1, S Daly 0-1.		C Moran 0-5.

7 March 1993	Cork	1-10 - 3-13	Wexford	Páirc Uí Chaoimh, Cork
	P O'Callaghan 1-1, C Casey 0-5, L Meaney 0-1, P Buckley 0-1, B Egan 0-1, K Hennessy 0-1.		E Scallan 1-2, M Storey 0-5, T Demspey 1-1, E Cleary 1-0, J O'Connor 0-2, A Fenlon 0-1, J Bolger 0-1, G O'Connor 0-1.	Referee: W Barrett (Tipperary)

7 March 1993	Galway	1-9 - 1-6	Clare	Ballinasloe Sportsfield, Ballinasloe
	T Keady 1-1, E Bourke 0-4, N Bourke 0-3, P Malone 0-1.		C Lyons 1-1, J Russell 0-2, J O'Connor 0-2, J McInerney 0-1.	Referee: S O'Meara (Offaly)

7 March 1993	Waterford	3-7 - 0-17	Dublin
	J Meaney 1-1, N Dalton 1-0, B Greene 1-0, J Beresford 0-2, N Crowley 0-1, P Prendergast 0-1, S Daly 0-1, E Brennan 0-1.		A O'Grady 0-9, S Dalton 0-5, R Boland 0-2, S Boland 0-1.	Referee: D Murphy (Wexford)

21 March 1993	Wexford	0-14 - 0-7	Dublin	Enniscorthy
	E Scallan 0-6, M Storey 0-2, J Bolger 0-2, D Prendergast 0-2, T Dempsey 0-1, E Cleary 0-1.		A O'Grady 0-3, J Morris 0-2, S McDermott 0-1, B McMahon 0-1.	Referee: P Delaney (Laois)

21 March 1993	Galway	0-12 - 1-9	Cork	Kenny Park, Athenry
	J Cooney 0-5, P Malone 0-1, M Coleman 0-1, J McGrath 0-1, M McGrath 0-1, J Rabbitte 0-1, L Burke 0-1.		B Egan 1-4, G Manley 0-1, P Kenneally 0-1, S McCarthy 0-1, P Buckley 0-1, B Corcoran 0-1.	Referee: P Horan (Offaly)

22 March 1993	Waterford	0-15 - 4-8	Clare	Cappoquin
	J Brenner 0-3, B o'Sullivan 0-3, B Greene 0-3, N Crowley 0-2, P Prendergast 0-1, D Byrne 0-1, S Daly 0-1, D Meaney 0-1.		J McInerney 3-1, C Lyons 0-4, A Neville 1-0, J Russell 0-1, P Markham 0-1, J O'Connell 0-1.	Referee: J McDonald (Tipperary)

=== Play-offs ===
28 March 1993 Play-off	Limerick	1-14 - 1-9	Antrim	Parnell Park, Donnycarney
	F Carroll 1-3, G Kirby 0-4, M Reale 0-2, P Heffernan 0-2, J Fitzgibbon 0-1, M Houlihan 0-1, D Clarke 0-1.	Report	J Close 1-0, G O'Kane 0-3, A Elliott 0-1, S McKillop 0-1, T McNaughton 0-1, B O'Kane 0-1, J McNaughton 0-1, P Walsh 0-1.	Referee: P Delaney (Laois)

28 March 1993 Play-off	Dublin	2-17 - 1-24	Waterford	Semple Stadium, Thurles
	B McMahon 1-4, A O'Grady 1-0, S Dalton 0-3, J Twomey 0-2, S McDermott 0-2, J Morris 0-1, TJ Finnegan 0-1, S Boland 0-1, D Kane 0-1, S Fleming 0-1.		J Beresford 0-8, P Prendergast 1-2, J Brenner 0-5, L O'Connor 0-3, B O'Sullivan 0-2, J Meaney 0-1, N Crowley 0-1, D Foran 0-1, B Green 0-1.	Referee: J McDonnell (Tipperary)

28 March 1993 Play-off	Clare	0-10 - 1-17	Cork	Semple Stadium, Thurles
	C Lyons 0-5, J Russell 0-1, S Sheedy 0-1, J O'Connor 0-1, E Cleary 0-1, J McInerney 0-1.		K Hennessy 1-2, G Manley 0-5, T McCarthy 0-3, B Egan 0-2, P O'Callaghan 0-2, C Casey 0-2, T Mulcahy 0-1.	Referee: M Darcy (Galway)

4 April 1993 Play-off	Cork	5-16 - 1-6	Waterford	Semple Stadium, Thurles
	P O'Callaghan 2-2, K Hennessy 2-2, B Egan 0-5, G Manley 1-1, P Buckley 0-3, S McCarthy 0-2, B Corcoran 0-1.		J Meaney 1-0, L O'Connor 0-2, T Browne 0-1, P Prendergast 0-1, J Beresford 0-1, B O'Sullivan 0-1.	Attendance: 1,900; Referee: W Barrett (Tipperary)

=== Knock-out stage ===
Bracket

Quarter-Finals
4B	Kerry	0-05
1A	Tipperary	0-14
3B	Cork	1-24
2A	Down	1-09
4A	Laois	0-09
1B	Wexford	2-11
2B	Galway	2-12
3A	Limerick	6-09

Semi-Finals
1A	Tipperary	1-13
3B	Cork	2-11
1B	Wexford	3-14
3A	Limerick	1-11

Final
3B	Cork	2-11, 0-18, 3-11
1B	Wexford	2-11, 3-09, 1-12

Quarter-finals

11 April 1993 Quarter-final	Galway	2-12 - 6-9	Limerick	Cusack Park, Ennis
	M McGrath 1-3, J Cooney 1-2, L Burke 0-2, J Rabbitte 0-2, E Burke 0-2, J McGrath 0-1.		G Kirby 2-3, P Heffernan 1-1, S Fitzgibbon 1-0, P Tobin 1-0, A Garvey 0-3, C Carey 0-1, F Carroll 0-1.	Attendance: 11,000; Referee: S O'Meara (Offaly)

11 April 1993 Quarter-final	Cork	1-24 - 1-9	Down	Croke Park, Dublin
	B Egan 0-8, T McCarthy 1-4, B Corcoran 0-4, T Mulcahy 0-2, G Manley 0-2, S McCarthy 0-1, P Buckley 0-1.		M Blaney 1-0, D Hughes 0-2, N Sands 0-1, D O'Prey 0-1, K Coulter 0-1, P McMullen 0-1, G McGrattan 0-1, M Baillie 0-1, G Savage 0-1.	Referee: M Darcy (Galway)

11 April 1993 Quarter-final	Kerry	0-5 - 0-14	Tipperary	FitzGerald Stadium, Killarney
	S Sheehan 0-1, M McKivergan 0-1, J Dunphy 0-1, C Walsh 0-1, DJ Leahy 0-1.		C Stakelum 0-5, P Fox 0-4, D Ryan 0-2, M Cleary 0-2, N English 0-1.

11 April 1993 Quarter-final	Laois	0-9 - 2-11	Wexford	Nowlan Park, Kilkenny
	T Dunne 0-5, PJ Cuddy 0-1, N Roe 0-1, M O'Hara 0-1, N Delaney 0-1.		T Dempsey 1-2, E Cleary 1-1, E Scallan 0-3, M Storey 0-2, J Bolger 0-2, J O'Connor 0-1.	Referee: T Murray (Limerick)

Semi-finals

25 April 1993 Semi-final	Tipperary	1-13 - 2-11	Cork	Semple Stadium, Thurles
	M Cleary 0-4, C Stakelum 0-4, C Bonnar 1-0, T Dunne 0-2, N English 0-1, P Fox 0-1, D Ryan 0-1.		B Egan 0-4, T Mulcahy 1-0, G Manley 1-0, C Casey 0-3, T McCarthy 0-2, P Buckley 0-1, S McCarthy 0-1.	Attendance: 35,000; Referee: P Delaney (Laois)

25 April 1993 Semi-final	Wexford	3-14 - 1-11	Limerick	Semple Stadium, Thurles
	L Murphy 2-1, J Bolger 0-6, E Cleary 1-1, E Scallan 0-3, M Storey 0-2, T Dempsey 0-1.		F Carroll 0-4, G Kirby 1-0, P Tobin 0-3, P Heffernan 0-2, D Clarke 0-1, S Fitzgibbon 0-1.	Referee: S O'Meara (Offaly)

Finals

9 May 1993 Final	Cork	2-11 - 2-11	Wexford	Semple Stadium, Thurles
	G Manley 2-1, B Egan 0-6, S McCarthy 0-3, C Casey 0-1.		L Murphy 1-3, E Scallan 1-1, M Storey 0-2, G O'Connor 0-2, J O'Connor 0-2, E Cleary 0-1.	Attendance: 21,900; Referee: W Barrett (Tipperary)

16 May 1993 Final replay	Cork	0-18 - 3-9	Wexford	Semple Stadium, Thurles
	B Egan 0-5, C Casey 0-4, T McCarthy 0-3, G Manley 0-2, P Buckley 0-2, J Cashman 0-1, S McCarthy 0-1.		M Storey 0-4, L Murphy 1-0, B Byrne 1-0, E Cleary 1-0, L O'Gorman 0-2, E Scallan 0-2, T Dempsey 0-1.	Attendance: 22,278; Referee: W Barrett (Tipperary)

22 May 1993 Final second replay	Cork	3-11 - 1-12	Wexford	Semple Stadium, Thurles
	B Egan 1-6, J Fitzgibbon 1-0, T Mulcahy 1-0, C Casey 0-2, P Buckley 0-1, P O'Callaghan 0-1, G Manley 0-1.		T Dempsey 0-6, E Cleary 1-0, L Murphy 0-3, C McBride 0-1, M Storey 0-1, L O'Gorman 0-1.	Attendance: 22,000; Referee: W Barrett (Tipperary)

=== Scoring statistics ===
Top scorers overall

Rank	Player	Team	Tally	Total	Matches	Average
1	Barry Egan	Cork	3-44	53	12	4.41
2	Gary Kirby	Limerick	5-32	47	8	5.87
3	Michael Cleary	Tipperary	2-32	38		
4	Cyril Lyons	Clare	3-21	30	6	5.00
5	Ger Manley	Cork	5-13	28		
5	Éamonn Scallan	Wexford	2-22	28		
6	Aonghus O'Grady	Dublin	1-23	26		
7	Johnny Brenner	Waterford	0-24	24		
8	Tom Dempsey	Wexford	2-16	22		
8	Martin Storey	Wexford	0-22	22		

Top scorers in a single game

Rank	Player	Team	Tally	Total	Opposition
1	Conor Stakelum	Tipperary	1-10	13	Antrim
2	John Troy	Offaly	2-05	11	Kilkenny
2	Michael Cleary	Tipperary	1-08	11	Kilkenny
3	Jim McInerney	Clare	3-01	10	Waterford
3	Brian Corcoran	Cork	1-07	10	Dublin
3	Ray Heffernan	Kilkenny	0-10	10	Offaly
4	J. P. McKillop	Antrim	2-03	9	Tipperary
4	Brian McMahon	Dublin	2-03	9	Cork
4	Gary Kirby	Limerick	2-03	9	Galway
4	Barry Egan	Cork	1-06	9	Wexford
4	Gary Kirby	Limerick	1-06	9	Offaly
4	Aonghus O'Grady	Dublin	0-09	9	Waterford

== Division 2 ==
=== Division 2 table ===
National Hurling League Quarter-Finals

Relegated teams (Restructure of NHL)

Pos	Team	Pld	W	D	L	Pts
1	Laois (C)	7	7	0	0	14
2	Kerry	7	6	0	1	12
3	Meath	7	5	0	2	10
4	Westmeath	7	3	0	4	6
5	Derry (R)	7	3	0	4	6
6	Carlow (R)	7	2	0	5	4
7	Wicklow (R)	7	1	1	5	3
8	Kildare (R)	7	0	1	6	1

== Division 3 ==
=== Division 3A table ===
Division 3 Final

Pos	Team	Pld	W	D	L	Pts
1	Roscommon (C)	5	5	0	0	10
2	Armagh	5	4	0	1	8
3	Fermanagh	5	3	0	2	6
4	Sligo	5	2	0	3	4
5	Leitrim	5	1	0	4	2
6	Cavan	5	0	0	5	0

=== Division 3B table ===
Division 3 Final

Team	Pld	W	D	L	Pts
Mayo	5	4	0	1	10
Monaghan	5	4	0	1	8
Louth	5	3	1	1	7
Tyrone	5	2	1	2	5
Donegal	5	1	1	3	3
Longford	5	0	1	4	1

=== Knock-out stage ===
Finals

11 April 1993 Final	Mayo	0-8 - 0-8	Roscommon	MacHale Park, Castlebar

24 April 1993 Final replay	Roscommon	w/o - scr.	Mayo	MacHale Park, Castlebar
