= Martin Storey =

Wexford hurler (born 1964)

Personal information
- Native name: Máirtín Ó Stoirín (Irish)
- Born: 7 July 1964 (age 62) The Ballagh, County Wexford, Ireland
- Occupation: Sports shop owner

Sport
- Sport: Hurling
- Position: Centre-forward
Club
- Years: Club
- Oulart–The Ballagh
Club titles
- Wexford titles: 5
Inter-county
Years	County	Apps (scores)
1986–2001	Wexford	31 (4–83)
Inter-county titles
- Leinster titles: 2
- All-Irelands: 1
- NHL: 0

Martin Storey (born 28 September 1964) is an Irish former hurler who played as a centre-forward at senior level for the Wexford county team.

Regarded as one of the greatest Wexford players of all-time, Storey made his first appearance for the team during the 1986 championship and was a regular member of the starting fifteen until his retirement before the 2001 championship. During that time he won one All-Ireland medal, two Leinster medals and three All-Star awards.

At club level Storey was a five-time county club championship medalist with Oulart–The Ballagh.

In retirement from playing Storey has become involved in team management and coaching. After serving as a selector at club level, he subsequently served as trainer of the Wexford senior camogie team and manager of the Wexford minor hurling team.

Storey's daughter, Ciara, is also an All-Ireland medalist with Wexford.

== Playing career ==
=== Club ===
Storey played his club hurling with Oulart–The Ballagh and enjoyed much success in a career that spanned three decades.

In 1994 Oulart–The Ballagh made the big breakthrough in the championship and Storey was in the forward line as the club reached the decider. St. Martin's provided the opposition on that occasion, however, a narrow 1-14 to 0-16 victory gave Storey his first championship medal.

Oulart made it two in-a-row in 1995 following a six-point defeat of Glynn-Barntown, giving Storey a second championship medal.

Three-in-a-row proved beyond Oulart–The Ballagh, however, the team were back in the championship decider again in 1997. A 2-11 to 0-14 defeat of Glynn-Barntown secured a third championship medal for Storey in four seasons.

After losing another county final in 2000, Storey's side returned to the championship decider again in 2004. A 1-17 to 1-10 score line ended a seven-year barren spell, denied Rathnure a third successive championship and gave Storey a fourth championship medal.

Storey won a fifth county championship medal in 2005 as Oulart–The Ballagh retained their title after a 1-15 to 1-9 defeat of St. Martin's.

Oulart–The Ballagh were beaten by Rathnure in their bid for three-in-a-row in 2006 following a draw and a replay. Storey retired from club hurling following this defeat.

=== Inter-county ===
Storey first came to prominence on the inter-county scene in the early 1980s as a member of the Wexford minor and under-21 hurling teams. He had little success in either grade before making his senior championship debut against Kilkenny in 1986.

It was not a happy time to be a Wexford hurler. The county had been pushed back into third place in the Leinster Championship behind both Kilkenny and Offaly. Provincial final appearances in 1988 and 1992 brought nothing but defeat for Storey's team. In 1993, Wexford looked set for glory when they reached the final of the National Hurling League. The opponents on that occasion were Cork, however, the game ended in a draw. The replay saw extra-time being played, however, both sides ended level once again. At the third attempt Cork emerged victorious by 3-11 to 1-12. In spite of this defeat expectations were still high for the Leinster championship. In the final of that competition Wexford drew with arch rivals and All-Ireland champions Kilkenny and there was hope of success. The replay was a different affair as Kilkenny won easily enough by 2-12 to 0-11. In spite of this, Storey was later presented with his first All-Star award.

Wexford were defeated in the Leinster final again in 1994 before disappearing from the championship at the first hurdle in 1995. By 1996 things were beginning to change in Wexford, with thanks to in no small way to the new manager Liam Griffin. Storey was appointed captain for the year. Offaly provided the opposition on that occasion; however, history was made as Wexford won by 2-23 to 2-15. It was Storey's first senior Leinster title and Wexford's first since 1977. Wexford later defeated Galway in the penultimate game of the championship, setting up an All-Ireland final meeting with Limerick. The Munster men were slight favourites going into the game. They were the beaten finalists of 1994 and had already beaten Clare, the reigning champions, in the Munster Championship. The game was far from a classic; however, it did provide excitement. Tom Dempsey was the hero of the day as he scored a goal after nineteen minutes to give Wexford a major advantage. His side led by 1-8 to 0-10 at half-time in spite of having Éamonn Scallan sent off. Wexford took a four-point lead in the second-half; however, this was whittled back to two points as Wexford hung on for the last twenty minutes. The final score of 1-13 to 0-14 showed how vital Dempsey's goal was. It was Storey's first All-Ireland medal and Wexford's first since 1968. He was subsequently presented with a second All-Star award.

Storey captured a second Leinster medal in 1997 as Kilkenny fell in the provincial decider. 1997, however, saw the introduction of the so-called ‘back-door’ system whereby the defeated Munster and Leinster finalists were allowed back into the All-Ireland championship at the quarter-final stage. Because of this, Wexford's opponents in the All-Ireland semi-final were Tipperary, the Munster runners-up. On that occasion Wexford were outclassed by Tipp who won by 2-16 to 0-15.

The following few years proved difficult as Wexford and Storey faced a resurgent Kilkenny that would win the next six Leinster titles. In spite of a lack of success on the field of play he won a third All-Star award in 1998. Storey retired from inter-county hurling in 2000 following two years of heavy defeats for Wexford in the provincial championship. He returned briefly the following season, making substitute appearances against Tipperary in the drawn and replayed All-Ireland semi-finals.

=== Inter-provincial ===
Storey also lined out with Leinster in the inter-provincial hurling championship. He collected two Railway Cup medals as Leinster defeated Ulster in 1993 and Connacht in 1998. He played a junior B match in 2020

== Post-playing career ==
In retirement from playing Storey has maintained a keen interest in the game. In 2002 he took over as trainer of the Wexford senior camogie team. He has also been involved with the successful Colaiste Bríde teams in Enniscorthy, who have had so much success in All-Ireland schools competitions. While still a senior player Storey had a major influence as part of the management team of the club's under-21 team. During his tenure as a selector the team regained the county premier championship title. His name has also been mentioned as a possible future manager of the Wexford senior hurling team.

On 17 January 2008 Storey was profiled on the TG4 television programme Laochra Gael.

In August 2013, following the death of Pat Cody, he was nominated as a Labour Party member of Wexford County Council. He lost his seat at the 2014 local elections.

In November 2015, Storey was named as the new manager of the Wicklow senior hurling team.

== Honours ==
=== Team ===
Oulart–The Ballagh

- Wexford Senior Club Hurling Championship (5): 1994, 1995, 1997, 2004, 2005,

Wexford

- All-Ireland Senior Hurling Championship (1): 1996 (c)
- Leinster Senior Hurling Championship (2): 1996 (c), 1997

Leinster

- Railway Cup (2): 1993, 1998

Sporting positions
Preceded by George O'Connor	Wexford Senior Hurling Captain; 1996	Succeeded by Rod Guiney
Preceded by Rod Guiney	Wexford Senior Hurling Captain; 1998	Succeeded by Paul Codd
Preceded by Paul Dempsey	Wexford Minor Hurling Manager; 2009–2012	Succeeded by Willie Cleary
Achievements
Preceded by Anthony Daly (Clare)	All-Ireland SHC winning captain 1996	Succeeded by Anthony Daly (Clare)
