= Liam Dunne =

Irish hurler (born 1968)

Personal information
- Native name: Liam Ó Dúinn (Irish)
- Born: 12 June 1968 (age 58) Oulart, County Wexford, Ireland
- Occupation: Sales rep
- Height: 5 ft 7 in (170 cm)

Sport
- Sport: Hurling
- Position: Centre-back
Club
- Years: Club
- 1986–2008: Oulart–The Ballagh
Club titles
- Wexford titles: 6
Inter-county*
Years	County	Apps (scores)
1988–2003	Wexford	39 (1–15)
Inter-county titles
- Leinster titles: 2
- All-Irelands: 1
- NHL: 0
- All Stars: 3
- *Inter County team apps and scores correct as of 14:47, 26 April 2015.

Liam Dunne (born 12 June 1968) is an Irish former hurler who played as a centre-back at senior level for the Wexford county team.

Born in Oulart, County Wexford, Dunne first played competitive hurling during his schooling at Oulart National School. He arrived on the inter-county scene at the age of sixteen when he first linked up with the Wexford minor team before later joining the under-21 side. He made his senior debut during the 1988 championship. Dunne immediately became a regular member of the starting fifteen and won one All-Ireland medal and two Leinster medals.

As a member of the Leinster inter-provincial team on a number of occasions Dunne won one Railway Cup medal. At club level he was a six-time championship medallist with Oulart–The Ballagh.

Throughout his career Dunne made 39 championship appearances for Wexford. He retired from inter-county hurling following the conclusion of the 2003 championship.

In retirement from playing Dunne became involved in team management and coaching. After taking charge of the Wexford minor team and the Oulart-the Ballagh senior team, he was appointed manager of the Wexford senior hurling team in 2011.

Dunne is widely regarded as one of Wexford's greatest hurlers of all time. During his playing days he won three All-Star awards. He has been repeatedly voted onto teams made up of the sport's greats, including at centre-back on a special all-time Wexford team in 2002 and on the Leinster team of the quarter century in 2009. Dunne was also chosen as one of the 125 greatest hurlers of all-time in a 2009 poll.

== Playing career ==
=== Club ===
Dunne played his club hurling with Oulart–The Ballagh and enjoyed much success during a golden age for the club.

After making his debut for the senior team in 1986, Dunne was a key member of the team when Oulart lost the championship deciders of 1989 and 1992.

In 1994 Oulart the Ballagh were back in the championship showpiece. St. Martin's provided the opposition on that occasion, however, a narrow 1–14 to 0–16 victory gave Dunne his first county club championship medal.

Oulart made it two in-a-row in 1995 following a six-point defeat of Glynn-Barntown, giving Dunne a second championship medal.

Three-in-a-row proved beyond Oulart the Ballagh, however, the team were back in the championship decider again in 1997. A 2–11 to 0–14 defeat of Glynn-Barntown secured a third championship medal for Dunne in four seasons.

After losing a third county final in 2000, Dunne's side returned to the championship decider again in 2004. A 1–17 to 1–10 score line ended a seven-year barren spell, denied Rathnure a third successive championship and gave Dunne a fourth championship medal.

Dunne won a fifth county championship medal in 2005 as Oulart the Ballagh retained their title after a 1–15 to 1–9 defeat of St. Martin's.

Oulart–The Ballagh were beaten by Rathnure in their bid for three-in-a-row in 2006 following a draw and a replay.

In 2007 Oulart qualified for a fourth successive county final. Buffer's Alley were the opponents, however, they provided little opposition. A huge 4–14 to 2–6 victory gave Oulart the title and gave Dunne a sixth championship medal.

Following Oulart–The Ballagh's championship decider defeat by St. Martin's in 2008, Dunne retired from club hurling.

=== Inter-county ===
Dunne was first selected for inter-county hurling as a member of the Wexford minor hurling team in 1985. He was a substitute that year as Wexford defeated Kilkenny by four points to take the Leinster crown. He was also a non-playing substitute as Wexford were later defeated by Cork in the All-Ireland decider.

Dunne's performance in the Leinster final defeat by Offaly the following year earned a call-up to the Wexford under-21 hurling team. Wexford later claimed the Leinster title before being defeated by Cork in the All-Ireland final.

In 1987, Dunne won a second Leinster under-21 medal, his first on the field of play.

Dunne made his senior debut for Wexford in the Oireachtas Tournament in 1988. Later that year he made his championship debut at midfield in a provincial quarter-final victory over Laois. Dunne became a regular member of the starting fifteen the following season.

In spite of making an early exit from the provincial campaign in 1990, Dunne's performance earned him his first All-Star award.

Success at senior level eluded Dunne for much of the early 1990s, as Wexford lost three successive Leinster finals as well as two National Hurling League deciders. Once again, however, his performances throughout the 1993 league and championship season earned him a second All-Star award.

In 1996 Dunne lined out in his fourth provincial decider, however, he was yet to end up on the winning side. Reigning champions and three-in-a-row hopefuls Offaly provided the opposition on that occasion, however, a 2–23 to 2–15 score line gave Wexford the title and gave Dunne a Leinster winners' medal. Wexford subsequently qualified for the All-Ireland decider for the first time in 19 years. Limerick provided the opposition as the sides faced off against each other for the first time in over forty years. Tom Dempsey was the hero of the day as he scored a goal after nineteen minutes to give Wexford a major advantage. His side led by 1–8 to 0–10 at half-time in spite of having Éamonn Scallan sent off. Wexford took a four-point lead in the second-half; however, this was whittled back to two points as Wexford hung on for the last twenty minutes. The final score of 1–13 to 0–14 gave Wexford the win and gave Dunne an All-Ireland winners' medal. He later collected a third All-Star award.

Dunne won a second Leinster medal in 1997 as Wexford defeated arch-rivals Kilkenny by 2–14 to 1–11. His side later surrendered their All-Ireland title following a defeat by beaten Munster finalists Tipperary in the All-Ireland semi-final.

The next few years proved difficult for Wexford as a resurgent Kilkenny won six successive Leinster titles. The expansion of the "back-door system" saw Dunne's reach the All-Ireland semi-final in 2003, however, Cork claimed the victory on that occasion after a draw and replay.

Towards the end of 2003 there was speculation that Dunne was about to retire from inter-county hurling. Dunne subsequently announced his retirement in early 2004.

=== Inter-provincial ===
Dunne also lined out with Leinster in the inter-provincial series of games. He won his sole Railway Cup medal in 1993 following Leinster's 1–15 to 2–6 defeat of Ulster.

== Managerial career ==
=== Early experience ===
Dunne first became involved in team management in 2005 when he began a two-year tenure as selector with the Wexford juvenile hurling teams. He became a selector with the Wexford minor team in 2007, however, the team had limited success.

=== Oulart–The Ballagh ===
In 2009 Dunne has just retired from club hurling when he succeeded Kevin Ryan as manager of the Oulart–The Ballagh senior team. In his debut season in charge, Dunne guided Oulart to a sixth successive county Championship decider. A 3–12 to 1–13 defeat of Buffer's Alley gave Dunne's team their seventh championship title ever.

Oulart reached the county final again in 2010. Dunne's side retained their title following a 1–14 to 0–6 win over St. Martin's.

In 2011, Dunne's team made history by winning a third successive championship for the first time in their history. A 1–10 to 0–11 defeat of Rathnure gave Oulart the historic victory.

=== Wexford ===
Following his success at club level Dunne was appointed manager of the Wexford senior hurling team in November 2011. His first season in charge saw Wexford lose their opening championship game to Offaly. Subsequent defeats of Westmeath and Carlow were followed by a championship exit at the hands of Cork. The second season saw Wexford give Dublin a scare at Wexford Park only for it to end in a draw. In the replay, Dublin ran out comfortable winners against Wexford at Parnell Park. Wexford were subsequently defeated by Clare in a game that went to extra-time at Semple Stadium. Despite those defeats, Dunne was ratified to remain in charge with Wexford for another two years.

== Private life ==
Dunne released his autobiography, I Crossed the Line, in 2004 in which he revealed his battle with alcoholism.

== Career statistics ==
=== Manager ===
As of match played 24 July 2016.

Team	From	To	Walsh Cup				National League				Leinster				All-Ireland				Total				
Team	From	To	G	W	D	L	G	W	D	L	G	W	D	L	G	W	D	L	G	W	D	L	Win %
Wexford	9 November 2011	7 October 2016	14	9	0	5	28	12	1	15	8	2	1	5	14	8	1	5	64	31	3	30	48

== Honours ==
=== Team ===
Oulart–The Ballagh

- Wexford Senior Club Hurling Championship (6): 1994, 1995, 1997, 2004, 2005, 2007

Wexford

- All-Ireland Senior Hurling Championship (1): 1996
- Leinster Senior Hurling Championship (2): 1996, 1997
- National Hurling League (Division 2) (1): 1995–96

Leinster

- Railway Cup (1): 1993

=== Individual ===
- All-Stars (3): 1990, 1993, 1996

=== Manager ===
Oulart–The Ballagh

- Wexford Senior Club Hurling Championship (3): 2009, 2010, 2011

Sporting positions
Preceded by Larry Murphy	Wexford Senior Hurling Captain; 1995	Succeeded by George O'Connor
Preceded by Colm Bonnar	Wexford Senior Hurling Manager; 2011–2016	Succeeded by Davy Fitzgerald
