= Stephen McDonagh =

Irish hurler

Personal information
- Native name: Stíofán Mac Donncha (Irish)
- Born: 15 October 1969 (age 57) Bruree, County Limerick, Ireland
- Occupation: Farmer
- Height: 5 ft 10 in (178 cm)

Sport
- Sport: Hurling
- Position: Right corner-back
Club
- Years: Club
- 1987-2010: Bruree
Club titles
- Limerick titles: 1
Inter-county
- Years: County
- 1992-2004: Limerick
Inter-county titles
- Munster titles: 2
- All-Irelands: 0
- NHL: 1
- All Stars: 0

Stephen McDonagh (born 15 October 1969) is an Irish retired hurler who played as a left corner-back for the Limerick senior team.

McDonagh joined the team during the 1992-93 National League and was a regular member of the starting fifteen until his retirement prior to the start of the 2004 championship. During that time he won two Munster medals and one National Hurling League medal. McDonagh was an All-Ireland runner-up on two occasions.

At club level McDonagh was a one-time county club championship medalist with Bruree.

== Playing career ==
=== Club ===
McDonagh played his club hurling with Bruree and enjoyed some success in a career that spanned almost twenty-five years.

Having played in and lost the county final of 1994, it would take twelve years before McDonagh lined out in his second championship decider. As captain of the team he led his club men against club kingpins Patrickwell. Bruree took an early lead but trailed by two points at the interval. A 49th-minute goal eventually helped the team to 1–16 to 1–15 victory. It was a first championship medal for McDonagh.

=== Inter-county ===
McDonagh joined the Limerick senior hurling panel during the 1992-93 National League and made his debut against Galway in the quarter-final of the competition.

The following year McDonagh became a regular member of the starting fifteen as Limerick qualified for the Munster final. Provincial whipping boys Clare were the opponents and a rout took place. A 0–25 to 2–10 score line gave Limerick the win and gave McDonagh his first Munster medal. Limerick subsequently qualified to meet Offaly in the All-Ireland final. It looked as if McDonagh's side were going to make history and claim a first title in twenty-one years as Limerick had a five-point lead with as many minutes left. Offaly suddenly sprang to life following a Johnny Dooley goal from a close-in free. Following the puck-out Offaly worked the ball up the field and Pat O'Connor struck for a second goal. The Offaly forwards scored another five unanswered points in the time remaining to secure a 3–16 to 2–13 victory. It was a bitter blow for Limerick who looked as if they had one hand on the Liam MacCarthy Cup.

Two years later in 1996 McDonagh was back in the provincial decider. Limerick faced Tipperary on that occasion and looked to be heading out of the championship as Tipp took a ten-point lead. McDonagh's side battled back to secure a 0–19 to 1–16 draw and a second chance to defeat their near rivals. The replay also saw Tipperary take a decisive lead, however, Limerick's goal-scoring ability was the deciding factor. A 4–7 to 0–16 score line gave Limerick the win and gave McDonagh a second Munster medal. The subsequent All-Ireland final pitted Limerick against Wexford for the first time in over forty years. The game was far from a classic; however, it did provide excitement. Tom Dempsey was the hero of the day as he scored a goal after nineteen minutes to give Wexford a major advantage. His side led by 1–8 to 0–10 at half-time in spite of having Éamonn Scallan sent off. Wexford took a four-point lead in the second-half; however, this was whittled back to two points as Wexford hung on for the last twenty minutes. The final score of 1–13 to 0-14 provided Limerick with a second All-Ireland defeat in three seasons.

Limerick bounced back immediately in 1997 by defeating Galway by 1–12 to 1–9 to take the National Hurling League title. It was McDonagh's sole winners' medal in that competition. The recent All-Ireland defeats, however, seemed to have damaged the team as Limerick crashed out of the provincial championship at an early stage.

This process repeated itself over the next few years and it was 2001 before McDonagh lined out in another Munster final. Tipperary were the opponents on that occasion, however, Limerick fell by 2–16 to 1–17.

McDonagh was now in the twilight of his career and success seemed as far away for Limerick as it did when he joined the panel. After failing to make an impact on the panel under new manager Pad Joe Whelehan in 2004, McDonagh decided to retire from inter-county hurling after a National League game against Galway.
