= 1997 National Hurling League =

66th season of the National Hurling League

League details
- Dates: 9 March – 5 October 1997
- Teams: 32

League champions
- Winners: Limerick (11th win)

Other division winners
- Division 2: Dublin

The 1997 National Hurling League (known as the Church & General National Hurling League for sponsorship reasons) was the 66th season of the National Hurling League.

== Structural changes ==
At a meeting of Central Council on 18 May 1996, the GAA decided to scrap winter league hurling for a two-year trial period. It was also decided, by a margin of 23 votes to 15, to complete the National Hurling League within the calendar year. After further negotiations the GAA decided to run the league on a March to October basis. Other provisions included the playing of three matches in March, two in April and one each in May and June. The league final was to be played in October. Play-offs to determine the standings of teams within the divisions were also abandoned in favour of using scoring averages.

== Division 1 ==
National Hurling League Division 1
- Season: 1997
- Champions: Limerick; 11th National League title Captain: Gary Kirby; Manager: Tom Ryan
- Relegated: Clare, Laois, Wexford
- Matches: 33
- Top goalscorer: D. J. Carey (5-43)
- Biggest home win: Limerick 2-14 - 0-2 Laois (27 April 1997)
- Biggest away win: Tipperary 1-23 - 2-9 Laois (23 March 1997)
- Highest scoring: Laois 3-9 - 3-16 Wexford (13 April 1997)
- All statistics correct as of 2 April 2017.

Galway came into the season as defending champions of the 1995-96 season. Laois, Limerick and Wexford joined Division 1 as the promoted teams.

On 5 October 1997, Limerick won the title after a 1-12 to 1-9 win over Galway in the final. It was their 11th league title overall and their first since 1991-92.

Clare, Laois and Wexford were relegated.

Kilkenny's D. J. Carey was the Division 1 top scorer with 5-43.

=== Table ===
Pos	Team	Pld	W	D	L	Pts	Notes
1	Kilkenny	7	5	0	2	10	
2	Limerick	7	4	2	1	10	Division 1 champions
3	Galway	7	5	0	2	10	Division 1 runners-up
4	Tipperary	7	4	1	2	9	
5	Offaly	7	4	0	3	8	
6	Clare	7	2	1	4	5	Relegated to Division 2
7	Wexford	7	2	0	5	4	Relegated to Division 2
8	Laois	7	0	0	7	0	Relegated to Division 2

=== Group stage ===
9 March 1997	Kilkenny	2-10 - 3-8	Limerick	Nowlan Park, Kilkenny
	N Moloney 2-2, DJ Carey 0-5, C Carter 0-1, P O'Neill 0-1, K O'Shea 0-1.		G Kirby 1-2, D Hennessy 1-1, M Galligan 1-0, O O'Neill 0-2, TJ Ryan 0-1, B Tobin 0-1, S O'Neill 0-1.	Referee: P Aherne (Carlow)

9 March 1997	Clare	2-19 - 2-9	Laois	Cusack Park, Ennis
	E Taaffe 1-3, J O'Connor 0-6, N Gilligan 0-5, C Clancy 1-0, S McMahon 0-2, C Lynch 0-1, F Tuohy 0-1, D Forde 0-1.		D Cuddy 0-7, O COss 2-0, N Rigney 0-2.	Referee: J Cooney (Galway)

9 March 1997	Wexford	0-7 - 0-14	Galway	Wexford Park, Wexford
	E Scallan 0-2, T Dempsey 0-2, A Fenlon 0-1, L Dunne 0-1, L O'Gorman 0-1.		K Broderick 0-4, L Burke 0-3, O Fahy 0-2, R Gantley 0-1, V Maher 0-1, A Kerins 0-1, M Coleman 0-1, J Cooney 0-1.	Referee: A Mac Suibhne (Dublin)

9 March 1997	Tipperary	1-15 - 2-14	Offaly	MacDonagh Park, Nenagh
	A Flanagan 0-7, D Ryan 1-2, B Gaynor 0-1, C Bonnar 0-1, L McGrath 0-1, J Enright 0-1, T Dunne 0-1.		M Duignan 2-0, Johnny Dooley 0-6, J Troy 0-3, B Whelehan 0-2, B Dooley 0-1, G Hanniffy 0-1, Joe Dooley 0-1.	Referee: G Harrington (Cork)

23 March 1997	Galway	2-11 - 3-11	Kilkenny	Duggan Park, Ballinasloe
	R Gantley 0-5, J Cooney 1-0, F Healy 1-0, O Fahy 0-2, J Campbell 0-1, L Burke 0-1, M Coleman 0-1, A Kerins 0-1.		DJ Carey 2-9, D Byrne 1-1, A Ronan 0-1.	Referee: P O'Connor (Limerick)

23 March 1997	Laois	2-9 - 1-23	Tipperary	Kelly Daly Park, Rathdowney
	O Dowling 1-1, N Rigney 1-0, D Cuddy 0-2, J Dollard 0-2, T Kenna 0-1, J Taylor 0-1, D Rooney 0-1, P Cuddy 0-1.		B O'Meara 1-2, A Flanagan 0-4, T Dunne 0-4, D Ryan 0-3, L Cahill 0-3, L McGrath 0-3, A Butler 0-2, L Sheedy 0-2.	Referee: J O'Leary (Cork)

23 March 1997	Offaly	1-18 - 1-13	Wexford	St. Brendan's Park, Birr
	Johnny Dooley 0-8, G Hanniffy 1-2, Joe Dooley 0-3, J Troy 0-3, J Pilkington 0-1, B Dooley 0-1.		E Scallan 0-6, L Murphy 1-0, P Codd 0-2, T Dempsey 0-2, A Fenlon 0-2, M Storey 0-1.	Referee: W Barrett (Tipperary)

23 March 1997	Limerick	1-10 - 0-13	Clare	Gaelic Grounds, Limerick
	D Hennessy 1-1, M Houlihan 0-4, J Moran 0-2, B Foley 0-2, TJ Ryan 0-1.		S McMahon 0-3, J O'Connor 0-3, D Forde 0-2, F Hegarty 0-2, R O'Hara 0-1, N Gilligan 0-1, PJ O'Connell 0-1.	Referee: J McDonnell (Tipperary)

30 March 1997	Clare	2-11 - 1-6	Offaly	Cusack Park, Ennis
	B Murphy 1-3, C Clancy 1-1, C Lynch 0-3, S McMahon 0-2, J O'Connor 0-1, E Taaffe 0-1.		S Óg Farrell 1-1, Johnny Dooley 0-2, J Troy 0-1, D Regan 0-1, G Hanniffy 0-1.	Referee: P O'Connor (Limerick)

30 March 1997	Wexford	0-16 - 0-18	Limerick	Bellefield Park, Enniscorthy
	T Dempsey 0-11, M Storey 0-3, R McCarthy 0-1, R Guiney 0-1.		G Kirby 0-9, M Houlihan 0-4, D Hennessy 0-2, O O'Neill 0-1, B Foley 0-1, TJ Ryan 0-1.	Referee: S MacMahon (Clare)

30 March 1997	Tipperary	0-17 - 1-16	Galway	Semple Stadium, Thurles
	A Flanagan 0-5, T Dunne 0-4, L Cahill 0-2, B O'Meara 0-2, J Leahy 0-1, L Sheedy 0-1, L McGrath 0-1, A Moloney 0-1.		D Coen 0-8, O Fahy 1-2, K Broderick 0-3, J Campbell 0-2, M Coleman 0-1.	Referee: D Murphy (Wexford)

30 March 1997	Kilkenny	1-14 - 0-10	Laois	Nowlan Park, Kilkenny
	DJ Carey 0-6, N Moloney 1-1, B McEvoy 0-2, A Comerford 0-1, A Ronan 0-1, D Byrne 0-1, C Carter 0-1, L Keoghan 0-1.		D Cuddy 0-5, D Conroy 0-1, O Dowling 0-1, P Cuddy 0-1, F O'Sullivan 0-1, T Dunne 0-1.	Referee: A Mac Suibhne (Dublin)

13 April 1997	Limerick	1-12 - 1-12	Tipperary	Gaelic Grounds, Limerick
	S O'Neill 1-0, G Kirby 0-3, M Houlihan 0-2, O Moran 0-2, B Foley 0-2, M Foley 0-1, B Tobin 0-1, P Tobin 0-1.		L Cahill 1-2, A Flanagan 0-3, T Dunne 0-2, K Tucker 0-2, B O'Meara 0-1, D Ryan 0-1, R Ryan 0-1.

13 April 1997	Galway	5-5 - 1-11	Clare	Kenny Park, Athenry
	O Fahy 2-1, J Rabbitte 1-2, D Coen 1-0, K Broderick 1-0, M Coleman 0-1, A Kerins 0-1.		N Gilligan 1-2, J O'Connor 0-4, C Lynch 0-1, R O'Hara 0-1, E taaffe 0-1, D Forde 0-1, PJ O'Connell 0-1.	Referee: P Delaney (Laois)

13 April 1997	Offaly	2-10 - 1-15	Kilkenny	St. Brendan's Park, Birr
	Johnny Dooley 0-5, J Pilkington 1-0, G Hanniffy 1-0, J Troy 0-2, G Cahill 0-2, J Ryan 0-1.		N Moloney 1-2, DJ Carey 0-5, C Carter 0-4, P Barry 0-1, P O'Neill 0-1, B McEvoy 0-1, D Byrne 0-1.	Referee: P. Aherne (Carlow)

13 April 1997	Laois	3-9 - 3-16	Wexford	O'Moore Park, Portlaoise
	T Kenna 2-0, D Cuddy 1-3, D Conroy 0-3, N Rigney 0-1, F O'Sullivan 0-1, B McEvoy 0-1.		E Scallan 0-10, L Murphy 1-1, G Laffan 1-0, B Byrne 1-0, M Jordan 0-2, P Finn 0-1, L O'Gorman 0-1, P Codd 0-1.	Referee: P Horan (Offaly)

27 April 1997	Kilkenny	2-10 - 1-8	Clare	Nowlan Park, Kilkenny
	DJ Carey 1-4, M Phelan 1-0, A Comerford 0-2, P O'Neill 0-1, N Moloney 0-1, D Byrne 0-1, B McEvoy 0-1.		N Gilligan 1-1, J O'Connor 0-4, S McMahon 0-1, C Lynch 0-1, PJ O'Connell 0-1.	Referee: P O'Connor (Limerick)

27 April 1997	Tipperary	2-12 - 1-8	Wexford	Semple Stadium, Thurles
	A Flanagan 1-8, L Cahill 1-0, M Cleary 0-2, K Tucker 0-1, T Dunne 0-1.		M Storey 1-1, T Dempsey 0-3, E Scallan 0-2, G Laffan 0-1, P Codd 0-1.	Referee: A Mac Suibhne (Dublin)

27 April 1997	Offaly	0-18 - 1-14	Galway	St. Brendan's Park, Birr
	Johnny Dooley 0-11, G Cahill 0-3, P Mulhare 0-2, J Pilkington 0-1, G Hanniffy 0-1.		D Coen 0-8, A Kerins 1-0, F Healy 0-2, J Rabbitte 0-1, O Fahy 0-1, N Shaughnessy 0-1, C Moore 0-1.	Referee: M Wadding (Waterford)

27 April 1997	Limerick	2-14 - 0-2	Laois	FitzGerald Park, Kilmallock
	G Kirby 2-7, D Hennessy 0-3, TJ Ryan 0-2, B Foley 0-1, S O'Neill 0-1.		P Delaney 0-2.	Referee: J Cooney (Galway)

10 May 1997	Wexford	2-10 - 2-11	Kilkenny	O'Kennedy Park, New Ross
	E Scallan 0-5, M Storey 1-1, G Laffan 1-0, T Dempsey 0-2, M Jordan 0-1, L Murphy 0-1.		DJ Carey 0-6, C Brennan 1-2, C Carter 1-1, A Comerford 0-1, P Larkin 0-1.	Referee: J O'Leary (Cork)

10 May 1997	Offaly	0-15 - 2-6	Laois	O'Connor Park, Tullamore
	P Mulhare 0-3, G Cahill 0-3, K Farrell 0-3, Johnny Dooley 0-2, B Whelehan 0-1, Joe Dooley 0-1, J Ryan 0-1, G Oakley 0-1.		O Coss 2-0, T Kenna 0-2, F Sullivan 0-2, N Rigney 0-1, R Cashin 0-1.	Referee: G Harrington (Cork)

10 May 1997	Clare	0-12 - 1-10	Tipperary	Cusack Park, Ennis
	J O'Connor 0-6, N Gilligan 0-3, B Murphy 0-2, D Fitzgerald 0-1.		T Dunne 1-1, K Tucker 0-2, M Cleary 0-2, J Leahy 0-2, R Ryan 0-1, A Flanagan 0-1, D Ryan 0-1.	Referee: P Horan (Offaly)

10 May 1997	Galway	1-24 - 1-10	Limerick	Kenny Park, Athenry
	D Coen 0-7, F Forde 1-2, K Broderick 0-5, L Burke 0-3, V Maher 0-2, J Rabbitte 0-2, J McGrath 0-2, O Fahy 0-1.		G Kirby 1-4, M Galligan 0-2, TJ Ryan 0-2, Shane O'Neill 0-1, P Heffernan 0-1.	Referee: L Barrett (Tipperary)

24 May 1997	Galway	3-16 - 1-10	Laois	Kenny Park, Athenry
	R Gantley 2-5, J Campbell 1-1, K Broderick 0-4, J McGrath 0-3, L Burke 0-2, F Forde 0-1.		D Cuddy 0-4, N Delaney 1-0, D Conroy 0-3, O Coss 0-1, N Rigney 0-1, PJ Peacock 0-1.

31 May 1997	Tipperary	3-19 - 3-11	Kilkenny	Semple Stadium, Thurles
	M Cleary 3-0, L Cahill 0-5, P O'Dwyer 0-4, T Dunne 0-4, K Tucker 0-3, A Butler 0-1, B Carroll 0-1, D Ryan 0-1.		DJ Carey 2-4, K O'Shea 1-2, L Keoghan 0-1, B McEvoy 0-1, A Comerford 0-1, D Byrne 0-1, D Cleere 0-1.	Referee: J O'Leary (Cork)

31 May 1997	Clare	0-16 - 3-14	Wexford	Cusack Park, Ennis
	A Whelan 0-4, S McNamara 0-4, A Neville 0-2, O Baker 0-2, P O'Rourke 0-2, B Murphy 0-1, Martin Conlon 0-1.		T Dempsey 1-5, L Murphy 1-1, B Byrne 1-0, M Storey 0-2, M Jordan 0-2, A Fenlon 0-2, G Laffan 0-1, L Dunne 0-1.	Referee: P Delaney (Laois)

31 May 1997	Offaly	0-16 - 1-16	Limerick	St. Brendan's Park, Birr
	G Cahill 0-4, K Farrell 0-3, B Dooley 0-2, C Cassidy 0-2, M Duignan 0-1, J Errity 0-1, Joe Dooley 0-1, G Hanniffy 0-1, J Troy 0-1.		O Moran 0-4, F Carroll 0-4, James Moran 1-0, P Heffernan 0-3, Shane O'Neill 0-2, D Hennessy 0-1, M Foley 0-1, M Galligan 0-1.	Referee: P Aherne (Carlow)

=== Knock-out stage ===
Quarter-finals

12 July 1997 Quarter-final	Tipperary	0-14 - 0-8	Dublin	Semple Stadium, Thurles
	B O'Meara 0-3, J Leahy 0-3, K Tucker 0-2, M Cleary 0-2, L McGrath 0-2, T Dunne 0-1, L Cahill 0-1.		J Brennan 0-4, A O'Grady 0-2, S Perkins 0-1, E Morrissey 0-1.	Referee: M Wadding (Waterford)

19 July 1997 Quarter-final	Cork	1-10 - 3-12	Kilkenny	Páirc Uí Chaoimh, Cork
	F McCormack 1-0, B Egan 0-3, A Browne 0-2, K Murray 0-2, B Corcoran 0-2, M Daly 0-1.		M Phelan 2-2, C Carter 1-4, C Brennan 0-3, DJ Carey 0-1, P Barry 0-1, A Comerford 0-1.	Referee: W Barrett (Tipperary)

Semi-finals

23 August 1997 Semi-final	Galway	1-14 - 0-6	Tipperary	Cusack Park, Ennis
	L Burke 1-1, O Fahy 0-4, E Cloonan 0-3, J Campbell 0-3, K Broderick 0-2, N Shaughnessy 0-1.		A Flanagan 0-2, L McGrath 0-1, R Ryan 0-1, D Hogan 0-1, K Tucker 0-1.	Referee: P O'Connor (Limerick)

24 August 1997 Semi-final	Kilkenny	0-10 - 1-17	Limerick	Nowlan Park, Kilkenny
	DJ Carey 0-3, B McEvoy 0-2, A Comerford 0-1, M Phelan 0-1, J Costelloe 0-1, N Moloney 0-1, PJ Delaney 0-1.		M Galligan 1-5, C Carey 0-3, B Foley 0-3, G Kirby 0-2, D Hennessy 0-1, O Moran 0-1, J Moran 0-1, F Carroll 0-1.	Referee: P Horan (Offaly)

Final

5 October 1997 Final	Limerick	1-12 - 1-9	Galway	Cusack Park, Ennis
	M Galligan 1-1, G Kirby 0-4, M Foley 0-2, J Moran 0-2, S O'Neill 0-1, B Foley 0-1, O Moran 0-1.		D Coen 0-6, O Fahy 1-0, J Campbell 0-1, M Coleman 0-1, J Rabbitte 0-1.	Referee: P Aherne (Carlow)

=== Top scorers ===
Top scorers overall

Rank	Player	Team	Tally	Total	Matches	Average
1	D. J. Carey	Kilkenny	5-43	58	9	6.44
2	Gary Kirby	Limerick	4-31	43	7	6.14
3	Johnny Dooley	Offaly	0-34	34	7	4.85
4	Aidan Flanagan	Tipperary	1-30	33	8	4.12
5	Darragh Coen	Galway	1-29	32	5	6.40
6	Tom Dempsey	Wexford	1-25	28	6	4.16
7	Éamonn Scallan	Wexford	0-25	25	5	5.00
8	David Cuddy	Laois	1-21	24	7	3.42
8	Jamesie O'Connor	Clare	0-24	24	6	4.00
10	Tommy Dunne	Tipperary	1-18	21	8	2.62

Top scorers in a single game

Rank	Player	Team	Tally	Total	Opposition
1	D. J. Carey	Kilkenny	2-09	15	Galway
2	Gary Kirby	Limerick	2-07	13	Laois
3	Rory Gantley	Galway	2-05	11	Laois
3	Aidan Flanagan	Tipperary	1-08	11	Wexford
3	Johnny Dooley	Offaly	0-11	11	Galway
3	Tom Dempsey	Wexford	0-11	11	Limerick
7	D. J. Carey	Kilkenny	2-04	10	Tipperary
7	Éamonn Scallan	Wexford	0-10	10	Laois
9	Michael Cleary	Tipperary	3-00	9	Kilkenny
9	Gary Kirby	Limerick	0-09	9	Wexford

== Division 2 ==
=== Table ===
Pos	Team	Pld	W	D	L	Pts	Notes
1	Dublin	7	7	0	0	14	Promoted to Division 1
2	Cork	7	6	0	1	12	Promoted to Division 1
3	Waterford	7	5	0	2	10	Promoted to Division 1
4	Antrim	7	3	0	4	6	
5	Meath	7	3	0	4	6	
6	London	7	2	0	5	4	
7	Westmeath	7	1	0	6	2	
8	Kerry	7	1	0	6	2	

=== Group stage ===
9 March 1997	London	0-09 - 1-13	Waterford	Emerald GAA Grounds, Ruislip
	T Moloney 0-6, K Grogan 0-1, A Heaney 0-1, J Kennedy 0-1.		P Flynn 0-7, B O'Sullivan 1-1, L O'Connor 0-1, B Walsh 0-1, P Queally 0-1, K McGrath 0-1, T Browne 0-1.

9 March 1997	Kerry	0-11 - 1-10	Dublin	Austin Stack Park, Tralee
	B O'Sullivan 0-7, B O'Mahony 0-2, J O'Sullivan 0-1, T Maunsell 0-1.		B McManus 1-1, J Brennan 0-3, M Morrissey 0-2, E Morrissey 0-2, R Boland 0-1, S Perkins 0-1.	Referee: S McMahon (Clare)

9 March 1997	Meath	1-11 - 1-08	Antrim	St. Loman's Park, Trim
	P Potterton 1-7, R Dorran 0-3, M Smith 0-1.		A McCloskey 0-4, P Graham 1-0, A Elliott 0-2, J Connery 0-1, Gregory O'Kane 0-1.	Referee: P Horan (Offaly)

9 March 1997	Cork	6-21 - 2-04	Westmeath	Páirc Uí Rinn, Cork
	A Browne 3-2, A Cummins 1-4, J Deane 1-2, R Dwane 1-0, F McCormack 0-3, G Manley 0-3, B Egan 0-2, S McGrath 0-2, T Kelleher 0-1, B Corcoran 0-1, M O'Connell 0-1.		B Kennedy 2-0, S McLoughlin 0-2, P Williams 0-1, O Devine 0-1.	Referee: M Wadding (Waterford)

23 March 1997	Waterford	2-19 - 0-03	Kerry	Fraher Field, Dungarvan
	M White 1-6, P Flynn 0-5, B Green 1-0, B O'Sullivan 0-2, K McGrath 0-2, T Fives 0-1, B Walsh 0-1, J Brenner 0-1, L O'Connor 0-1.		J O'Sullivan 0-1, M Slattery 0-1, M Foley 0-1.	Referee: P Aherne (Carlow)

23 March 1997	Dublin	1-10 - 0-02	Meath	Parnell Park, Dublin
	J Brennan 0-6, E Morrissey 1-2, C McCann 0-1, B O'Sullivan 0-1.		P Potterton 0-2.	Referee: P Dunphy (Kilkenny)

23 March 1997	Westmeath	1-11 - 0-08	London	Cusack Park, Mullingar
	P Clarke 0-7, P Connaughton 1-0, S McLoughlin 0-2, P Clancy 0-1, P Williams 0-1.		D Murphy 0-2, T Moloney 0-2, K Grogan 0-2, J Kennedy 0-1, A Heaney 0-1.	Referee: J Cooney (Galway)

23 March 1997	Antrim	2-11 - 4-21	Cork	Casement Park, Belfast
	SP McKillop 2-1, C McCambridge 0-7, Gregory O'Kane 0-1, J Connelly 0-1, A Delargy 0-1.		J Deane 2-6, G Manley 2-4, R Dwane 0-3, A Browne 0-2, T Kelleher 0-2, S McGrath 0-1, M Daly 0-1, F McCormack 0-1, S Óg Ó hApilín 0-1.	Referee: J Gribben (Down)

30 March 1997	Kerry	2-11 - 3-12	Antrim	Austin Stack Park, Tralee
	C Walsh 1-3, B O'Mahony 1-0, M Slattery 0-2, J O'Sullivan 0-2, G Frehill 0-2, I Brick 0-1, S Fitzgerald 0-1.		C McCambridge 0-5, A Delargy 1-1, Gregory O'Kane 1-1, M McConnon 1-0, Gary O'Kane 0-2, SP McKillop 0-2, P Jennings 0-1.	Referee: S O'Leary (Cork)

30 March 1997	Meath	2-11 - 0-07	Westmeath	St. Loman's Park, Trim
	M Massey 1-2, P Potterton 0-5, J Dorran 1-0, J Gorry 0-2, M Smith 0-1, E Howley 0-1.		J Gavigan 0-2, P Clancy 0-2, D Gallagher 0-1, P Clarke 0-1, C Murtagh 0-1.	Referee: G Devlin (Armagh)

30 March 1997	London	2-05 - 2-18	Dublin	Emerald GAA Grounds, Ruislip
	D Spellman 1-1, M Lyons 1-0, T Moloney 0-3, J Kennedy 0-1.		C McCann 1-2, E Morrissey 0-5, S Perkins 1-1, J Brennan 0-4, B McMahon 0-2, D Hernon 0-2, R Boland 0-1.	Referee: T McIntyre (Antrim)

30 March 1997	Cork	2-15 - 0-11	Waterford	Páirc Uí Rinn, Cork
	S McGrath 2-4, G Manley 0-6, J Deane 0-2, B Corcoran 0-1, B O'Driscoll 0-1, R Dwane 0-1.		P Flynn 0-5, K McGrath 0-1, M White 0-1, B Walsh 0-1, P Power 0-1, J Brenner 0-1, T Browne 0-1.

13 April 1997	Dublin	1-10 - 1-06	Cork	Parnell Park, Dublin
	E Morrissey 1-2, C McCann 0-2, L Walsh 0-1, B McMahon 0-1, B O'Sullivan 0-1, S Perkins 0-1, J Brennan 0-1, G Ennis 0-1.		B Egan 1-0, S Óg Ó hAilpín 0-1, A Cummins 0-1, J Deane 0-1, M Hayes 0-1, G Manley 0-1, T Kelleher 0-1.	Referee: W Barrett (Tipperary)

13 April 1997	Waterford	5-13 - 3-10	Meath	Fraher Field, Dungarvan
	P Flynn 2-3, M White 1-2, B Walsh 1-2, B O'Sullivan 1-0, K McGrath 0-2, D Bennett 0-2, L O'Connor 0-1, T Feeney 0-1.		P Potterton 2-4, R Dorran 1-1, M Cole 0-2, P Donnelly 0-2, A O'Neill 0-1.	Referee: W Horgan (Cork)

13 April 1997	Antrim	1-22 - 2-13	London	Casement Park, Belfast
	C McCambridge 1-12, Gregory O'Kane 0-3, R McNaughton 0-3, A Delargy 0-2, P McKillen 0-2.		T Moloney 2-6, J King 0-4, K O'Driscoll 0-3.

13 April 1997	Westmeath	1-07 - 2-17	Kerry	Cusack Park, Mullingar
	S McLoughlin 0-6, R Galvin 1-0, B Kennedy 0-1.		B O'Sullivan 1-8, B O'Mahony 0-5, G O'Sullivan 1-0, C Walsh 0-2, I Brick 0-1, G Frehill 0-1.	Referee: J Cooney (Galway)

27 April 1997	Meath	1-07 - 2-11	Cork	St. Loman's Park, Trim
	M Cole 1-2, P Potterton 0-2, M Smith 0-1, B Murray 0-1, R Dorran 0-1.		J Deane 0-6, B Egan 1-1, B Corcoran 1-0, M Daly 0-2, A Browne 0-2.	Referee: T McIntyre (Antrim)

27 April 1997	Waterford	1-11 - 3-07	Dublin	Walsh Park, Waterford
	P Flynn 1-5, B O'Sullivan 0-2, K McGrath 0-2, L O'Connor 0-1, T Feeney 0-1.		C Featherstone 2-0, J Brennan 0-5, B McMahon 1-0, G Ennis 0-1, S Perkins 0-1.	Referee: J McDonnell (Tipperary)

27 April 1997	Antrim	5-13 - 4-09	Westmeath	Casement Park, Belfast
	A Elliott 3-3, Gary O'Kane 1-1, Gregory O'Kane 1-1, C McCambridge 0-3, J Carson 0-3, P McKillen 0-2.		B Kennedy 2-1, D Gallagher 1-2, S McLoughlin 0-5, J Gavin 1-0, P Dalton 0-1.

27 April 1997	London	2-14 - 3-09	Kerry	Emerald GAA Grounds, Ruislip
	T Moloney 0-7, J Comerford 1-1, D Spellman 1-0, D Murphy 0-3, R Murphy 0-2, S Tooher 0-1.		M Slattery 1-4, J O'Sullivan 1-0, T Maunsell 1-0, C Walsh 0-4, G Frehill 0-1.

10 May 1997	Kerry	0-06 - 3-10	Meath	Austin Stack Park, Tralee
	P Cronin 0-1, I Maunsell 0-1, I Brick 0-1, B O'Mahony 0-1, M Slattery 0-1, G Frehill 0-1.		P Donnelly 1-1, M Cole 1-1, P Potterton 0-4, R Dorran 1-0, F McMahon 0-1, B Gilsenin 0-1, M Smith 0-1, A O'Neill 0-1.

11 May 1997	Cork	5-24 - 0-06	London	Páirc Uí Rinn, Cork
	J Deane 2-3, G Manley 1-6, B Egan 0-6, A Browne 1-2, S McGrath 1-2, D Murphy 0-2, F McCormack 0-1, A Cummins 0-1, M O'Connell 0-1.		K McCaughey 0-3, R Murphy 0-1, J Comerford 0-1, T Moloney 0-1.	Referee: P Aherne (Carlow)

11 May 1997	Westmeath	1-06 - 3-22	Waterford	Cusack Park, Mullingar
	S McLoughlin 0-4, R Galvin 1-0, B Kennedy 0-1, C Murtagh 0-1.		P Flynn 1-12, B O'Sullivan 2-3, P Power 0-3, S Frampton 0-1, K McGrath 0-1, L O'Connor 0-1, D Bennett 0-1.	Referee: P Delaney (Laois)

11 May 1997	Dublin	3-11 - 1-13	Antrim	Parnell Park, Dublin
	J Brennan 0-7, G Ennis 1-2, D Hernon 1-0, B McMahon 1-0, C Ring 0-1, P O'Donoghue 0-1.		J Carson 1-5, A Delargy 0-2, P Jennings 0-2, Gregory O'Kane 0-2, C McCambridge 0-1, Gary O'Kane 0-1.

28 May 1997	Kerry	1-06 - 2-22	Cork	Austin Stack Park, Tralee
	P O'Mahony 1-0, V Murphy 0-2, B O'Mahony 0-1, C Walsh 0-1, WJ Lean 0-1, E Maunsell 0-1.		G Manley 0-7, K Murray 1-3, S McGrath 1-3, P Ryan 0-3, B Egan 0-2, R Dwane 0-1, D O'Sullivan 0-1, M Daly 0-1, D Murphy 0-1.

31 May 1997	London	3-08 - 1-11	Meath	Emerald GAA Grounds, Ruislip
	T Moloney 1-6, R Murphy 2-0, K McCaughey 0-2.		M Massey 1-2, M Cole 0-5, PJ Walsh 0-2, N Horan 0-1, P Kelly 0-1.

1 June 1997	Waterford	4-12 - 4-10	Antrim	Walsh Park, Waterford
	P Flynn 1-5, B O'Sullivan 1-1, K McGrath 1-0, S Frampton 1-0, T Browne 0-2, D Bennett 0-2, B Walsh 0-1, M White 0-1.		J Carson 2-1, Gregory O'Kane 1-3, A Delargy 1-0, C McCambridge 0-3, Gary O'Kane 0-1, P McKillen 0-1, A Elliott 0-1.	Referee: D Murphy (Wexford)

1 June 1997	Dublin	0-23 - 1-06	Westmeath	Parnell Park, Dublin
	J Brennan 0-6, E Morrissey 0-4, S Dalton 0-3, C McCann 0-2, G Ennis 0-2, B McMahon 0-2, P O'Donoghue 0-2, M Morrissey 0-1, C Ring 0-1.		P Clarke 1-2, D Gallagher 0-2, B Kennedy 0-1, P Williams 0-1.

=== Top scorers ===
Top scorers overall

Rank	Player	Club	Tally	Total	Matches	Average
1	Paul Flynn	Waterford	5-42	57	7	8.14
2	Tom Moloney	London	3-31	40	7	5.71
3	Ger Manley	Cork	3-27	36	6	6.00
4	Joe Deane	Cork	5-20	35	6	5.83
5	Connor McCambridge	Antrim	1-31	34	7	4.85
6	Pat Potterton	Meath	3-24	33	6	5.60
7	Jamesie Brennan	Dublin	0-32	32	7	4.57
8	Billy O'Sullivan	Waterford	5-09	24	6	4.00
8	Seánie McGrath	Cork	4-12	24	7	3.42
9	Gregory O'Kane	Antrim	3-12	21	7	3.00
9	Eamon Morrissey	Dublin	2-15	21	6	3.50

Top scorers in a single game

Rank	Player	Club	Tally	Total	Opposition
1	Connor McCambridge	Antrim	1-12	15	London
1	Paul Flynn	Waterford	1-12	15	Westmeath
2	Alastair Elliot	Antrim	3-03	12	Westmeath
2	Joe Deane	Cork	2-06	12	Antrim
2	Tom Moloney	London	2-06	12	Antrim
3	Alan Browne	Cork	3-02	11	Westmeath
3	Brendan O'Sullivan	Kerry	1-08	11	Westmeath
4	Ger Manley	Cork	2-04	10	Antrim
4	Pat Potterton	Meath	2-04	10	Waterford
4	Seánie McGrath	Cork	2-04	10	Waterford
4	Pat Potterton	Meath	1-07	10	Antrim
