= Paul Finn (hurler) =

Irish hurler (born 1973)

Personal information
- Native name: Pól Ó Finn (Irish)
- Born: 1973 (age 52–53) Oulart, County Wexford, Ireland
- Occupation: Lorry driver

Sport
- Sport: Hurling
- Position: Full-forward
Club
- Years: Club
- Oulart–The Ballagh
Club titles
- Wexford titles: 5
Inter-county
- Years: County
- 1994-2001: Wexford
Inter-county titles
- Leinster titles: 2
- All-Irelands: 1
- NHL: 0
- All Stars: 0

Paul Finn (born 1973) is an Irish former hurler. At club level, he played with Oulart–The Ballagh and at inter-county level was a member of the Wexford senior hurling team.

== Career ==
Finn first played hurling to a high standard as a student at St Peter's College in Wexford. He lined out in all grades during his time there, including the Leinster Colleges SHC.

At club level, Finn first played for the Oulart–The Ballagh club in the juvenile and underage grades before progressing to adult level. He won three Wexford SHC medals in a four-year period between 1994 and 1997. Finn ended his career by winning consecutive SHC titles in 2004 and 2005.

Finn first appeared on the inter-county scene with Wexford during a two-year tenure with the minor team. He later had an unsuccessful spell with the under-21 team. After lining out with the junior team for a season, he made his senior team debut in 1994. He won a Leinster SHC medal in 1996, before coming on as a substitute for Rod Guiney when Wexford beat Limerick in the 1996 All-Ireland final.

A second Leinster SHC medal followed for Finn in 1997, when Wexford retained the title after a defeat of Kilkenny. His inter-county career ended in 2001.

== Honours ==
Oulart–The Ballagh

- Wexford Senior Hurling Championship: 1994, 1995, 1997, 2004, 2005

Wexford

- All-Ireland Senior Hurling Championship: 1996
- Leinster Senior Hurling Championship: 1996, 1997
