= Larry O'Gorman =

Irish hurler (born 1967)

Personal information
- Native name: Labhrás Ó Gormáin (Irish)
- Nickname: The Brother
- Born: October 1967 (age 59) Wexford, Ireland
- Occupation: Salesman
- Height: 6 ft 0 in (183 cm)

Sport
- Sport: Hurling
- Position: Left wing-back
Club
- Years: Club
- Faythe Harriers
Club titles
- Wexford titles: 1
Inter-county
- Years: County
- 1987-2004: Wexford
Inter-county titles
- Leinster titles: 2
- All-Irelands: 1
- NHL: 0
- All Stars: 1

Larry O'Gorman (born October 1967) is an Irish former hurler. At club level, he played with Faythe Harriers and at inter-county level was a member of the Wexford senior hurling team.

== Career ==
At club level, O'Gorman first played for Faythe Harriers in Wexford at juvenile and underage levels. He won consecutive Wexford U21HC titles in 1987 and 1988. By that stage, O'Gorman had progressed to the club's senior team. He won a Wexford SHC title in 2001 following a 0-13 to 0-09 win over Rapparees in the final.

O'Gorman first appeared on the inter-county scene with Wexford as a member of the minor team. He won a Leinster MHC medal in 1985, before losing the subsequent All-Ireland minor final to Cork. O'Gorman progressed to the under-21 team and won consecutive Leinster U21HC medals, as well as appearing in the 1986 All-Ireland under-21 final defeat by Galway. He also played Gaelic football at under-21 level with Wexford.

O'Gorman joined the senior team in 1987. He won a Leinster SHC medal in 1996, before clining out at left wing-back when Wexford beat Limerick in the 1996 All-Ireland final. O'Gorman's performances earned him an All-Star award, while he was also named Hurler of the Year.

A second Leinster SHC medal followed for O'Gorman in 1997, when Wexford retained the title after a defeat of Kilkenny. He also earned selection for the Leinster team and won Railway Cup medals in 1993 and 1998. O'Gorman retired from inter-county hurling in February 2004.

== Honours ==
Faythe Harriers

- Wexford Senior Hurling Championship: 2001
- Wexford Under-21 Hurling Championship: 1987, 1988

Wexford

- All-Ireland Senior Hurling Championship: 1996
- Leinster Senior Hurling Championship: 1996, 1997
- Leinster Under-21 Hurling Championship: 1986, 1987
- Leinster Minor Hurling Championship: 1985

Leinster

- Railway Cup: 1993, 1998

Awards
| Preceded by Seánie McMahon | Texaco Hurler of the Year; 1996 | Succeeded by Jamesie O'Connor |
| Preceded by Brian Lohan | Powerscreen Hurler of the Year; 1996 | Succeeded by Jamesie O'Connor |
