= John Brenner =

John Brenner may refer to:

- John Lewis Brenner (1832–1906), United States Representative from Ohio
- John Brenner (shot putter) (born 1961), American track and field athlete
- John S. Brenner (born 1968), mayor of York, Pennsylvania
- John Brenner (1967-2026), singer and guitarist with Revelation
- John W.O. Brenner (1874–1962), Lutheran pastor and president of the Wisconsin Evangelical Lutheran Synod, 1933–1953
- Johnny Brenner (born 1971), Irish hurling player
