= Paul Finn =

Paul Finn may refer to:

- Paul Finn (hurler), Irish hurler
- Paul Finn (judge), Australian federal court judge

== See also ==
- Paul Anthony Finn, Irish singer-songwriter
