= Willie Devereux =

Irish hurler

Personal information
- Native name: Liam Déabhrús (Irish)
- Born: 23 January 1991 (age 35) Rosslare Harbour, County Wexford, Ireland
- Occupation: Student

Sport
- Sport: Hurling
- Position: Right corner-back
Club
- Years: Club
- 2008-present: St Martin's
Club titles
- Wexford titles: 3
Inter-county*
Years	County	Apps (scores)
2012-	Wexford	1 (0-00)
Inter-county titles
- Leinster titles: 0
- All-Irelands: 0
- NHL: 0
- All Stars: 0
- *Inter County team apps and scores correct as of 12:51, 3 June 2012.

William Devereux (born 23 January 1991) is an Irish hurler who plays as a right corner-back for the Wexford senior team.

Willie started grassroots hurling underage with St Mary's Rosslare GAA before moving to St Martin's in 2003.

Devereux made his first appearance for the team during the 2012 championship and immediately became a regular member of the starting fifteen.

At the club level, Devereux is a three-time county club championship medalist with St Martin's, winning titles with them in 2008, 2017 and 2019.
