= Francis Forde (hurler) =

Irish hurling selector & coach (born 1974)

Personal information
- Native name: Proinsias Mac Giollarnáth (Irish)
- Born: 25 March 1974 (age 52) Turloughmore, County Galway, Ireland
- Occupation: Secondary school Math teacher

Sport
- Sport: Hurling
- Position: Midfield
Club
- Years: Club
- Turloughmore
Club titles
- Galway titles: 0
College
- Years: College
- University College Galway
College titles
- Fitzgibbon titles: 0
Inter-county*
Years	County	Apps (scores)
1993-2002	Galway	11 (5-30)
Inter-county titles
- Connacht titles: 4
- All-Irelands: 0
- NHL: 1
- All Stars: 0
- *Inter County team apps and scores correct as of 20:53, 13 August 2018.

Francis Forde (born 1974) is an Irish hurling selector and former coach, manager and player who is currently a selector with the Galway senior hurling team.

== Playing career ==
=== University ===
He played for University College Galway in the Fitzgibbon Cup.

=== Inter-county ===
==== Minor and under-21 ====
Forde first played for Galway as a member of the minor hurling team on 5 August 1991. He made his first appearance in a 2-15 to 1-13 All-Ireland semi-final defeat by Tipperary at Parnell Park.

Forde was eligible for the minor grade once again the following year. On 6 September 1992, he was at midfield when Galway defeated Waterford by 1-13 to 2-04 in the All-Ireland final.

After ending his tenure with the minor team, Forde immediately progressed onto the Galway under-21 team. On 3 October 1993, he was at right wing-forward when Galway defeated Kilkenny by 2-09 to 3-03 to win the All-Ireland Championship.

==== Senior ====
Forde made his debut for the Galway senior team on 17 October 1993 in a 2-14 to 1-10 National Hurling League defeat of Wexford at Kenny Park. After ending the league campaign as runners-up, Forde subsequently made his championship debut in a 2-21 to 2-06 defeat of Roscommon in the All-Ireland quarter-final on 17 July 1994.

On 16 July 1995, Forde won a Connacht Championship medal following a 2-21 to 2-12 defeat of Roscommon in the final.

Forde collected his first national silverware at senior level on 12 May 1996 when Galway defeated Tipperary by 2-10 to 2-08 in the National League final. He later won a second successive Connacht Championship medal after a 3-19 to 2-10 defeat of Roscommon in the final. Forde's total of 2-08 in that game was the highest personal tally of any player in a single game in that year's championship.

On 13 July 1997, Forde won a third successive Connacht Championship medal after Galway's 6-24 to 0-05 defeat of Roscommon in the final.

Forde won a fourth and final Connacht Championship medal on 12 July 1998 after a 2-27 to 3-13 defeat of Roscommon in the final.

After growing disillusioned with his increasingly peripheral role on the team, Forde left the Galway panel after the 1999 National League.

Forde returned to the Galway senior team during the 2002 National League and played for one season before leaving the panel again.

== Honours ==
=== Player ===
Galway

- Connacht Senior Hurling Championship: 1995, 1996, 1997, 1998
- National Hurling League: 1995-96
- All-Ireland Under-21 Hurling Championship: 1993
- All-Ireland Minor Hurling Championship: 1992

=== Management ===
St. Rynagh's

- Offaly Senior Hurling Championship: 2016

Galway

- All-Ireland Senior Hurling Championship: 2017
- Leinster Senior Hurling Championship: 2017, 2018
- National Hurling League: 2017
- All-Ireland Minor Hurling Championship: 2004, 2005
