= David Murphy (Wexford Gaelic footballer) =

Irish Gaelic footballer

Sport
- Football Position: Centre Back
Club
- Years: Club
- St Mary's Rosslare
Inter-county
- Years: County
- Wexford

David Murphy is an Irish Gaelic football manager and former player. He played for the Wexford county team until 2013, when he retired with 180 caps, making him his county's most experienced player of all time. He captained Wexford against Dublin in the 2011 Leinster Senior Football Championship Final. He was cited for participating in a mass brawl against Longford in their 2013 All-Ireland Senior Football Championship second round qualifier and suspended for one match. Then manager, Conor O'Connor, said of Murphy "They come, they go, great players with lightning speed and thunderous shots. But there is still only one Murph." In January 2021, he was appointed manager of the Wexford under-20 football team.
