= Liam Griffin (hurler) =

Irish hurler and manager (born 1946)

Personal information
- Native name: Liam Ó Grífín (Irish)
- Born: 1946 (age 79–80) Rosslare, County Wexford, Ireland
- Occupation: Hotelier

Sport
- Sport: Hurling
- Position: Right corner-forward
Clubs
- Years: Club
- St Mary's Rosslare; Newmarket-on-Fergus; Wexford District
Club titles
- Clare titles: 3
Inter-county
Years	County	Apps (scores)
1968	Clare	1 (1-02)
Inter-county titles
- Munster titles: 0
- All-Irelands: 0
- NHL: 0

Liam Griffin (born 1946) is an Irish former hurler and manager. He played hurling at various times with his local clubs Rosslare and Newmarket-on Fergus with the Wexford and Clare senior inter-county teams in the 1960s. Griffin later served as manager of the Wexford senior inter-county team from in 1995 and 1996. Later he was instrumental on the Hurling Development Committee that established the Christy Ring Cup and Nicky Rackard Cup for weaker hurling counties. In 2009 he was named in the Sunday Tribune's list of the 125 Most Influential People In GAA History.

== Early life ==
Born and raised in Rosslare, County Wexford, Griffin played both hurling and Gaelic football as a boarder at the De La Salle College in Waterford. He won consecutive Corn Uí Mhuirí titles in 1964 and 1965, as well as captaining the college's Dr Harty Cup team to defeat by Limerick CBS in 1965.

== Club career ==
Griffin's home club of St Mary's Rosslare had very little in terms of hurling. He never played juvenile or underage and only began his club career in earnest after moving to Shannon. Griffin soon joined the Newmarket-on-Fergus club and won three consecutive Clare SHC medals between 1966 and 1968, following three consecutive defeats of Clarecastle.

After returning to his hometown of Rosslare, Griffin played with and trained the St Mary's club to the Wexford JAFC title in 1975. He was later player-manager of the Wexford District team that beat HWH–Bunclody by 3-07 to 0-07 in the 1977 final. Griffin suffered an injury in the game that resulted in a piece of his kidney having to be removed in an emergency operation.

== Inter-county career ==
Griffin first played for Wexford as a member of the minor team beaten by kilkenny in the 1964 Leinster minor semi-final. He immediately progressed to the under-21 team, won a Leinster U21HC medal and was a substitute when Wexford beat Tipperary by 3-07 to 1-04 in the 1965 All-Ireland under-21 final.

Griffin was also a member of the Wexford intermediate team in 1965 and won a Leinster IHC medal before being beaten by Cork in the 1965 All-Ireland home final. He later declared for Clare and was a dual player at under-21 levels in 1966 and 1967. Griffin was drafted onto the senior team for a National Hurling League games against Dublin in March 1968. He later scored 1-02 in Clare's 1968 Munster SHC first round defeat of Waterford.

== Coaching career ==
Griffin's coaching experience was limited to club and juvenile levels in his local area. He had actively sought the position of Wexford minor team manager on a number of occasions but was unsuccessful. Griffin was appointed manager of the Wexford senior hurling team in September 1994. His first season in charge saw a mid-table finish for Wexford in Division 2 of the National League, before exiting the Leinster SHC after a defeat by Offaly. There were also off-field difficulties, with Griffin stripping Liam Dunne of the captaincy after playing a club game the week before Wexford's game against Offaly.

Griffin retained the managerial position for a second season and guided Wexford to their first Leinster SHC title in 19 years after a 2-23 to 2-15 defeat of Offaly in the final. He later steered the team to a first All-Ireland SHC title in 28 years, after Wexford's 1-13 to 0-14 defeat of Limerick in the 1996 All-Ireland final. Griffin was named Philips Sports Manager of the Year, before stepping down from the management position in October 1996.

== Promotion of hurling ==
In early 2000, Griffin said the GAA should be ashamed of itself over its failure in the promotion of hurling.

Australia is 24 hours away, yet we can create a new game with the Aussie Rules lads. Longford and Leitrim are right here, yet we largely ignore them and many others too when it comes to promoting hurling. The new D. J. Carey could be living in Longford, Leitrim or Donegal, but we'll never know. We have failed him. [...] If someone can market coloured gripe water, call it Coca-Cola and clean up worldwide, we should be able to sell hurling in Longford.

== Honours ==
=== Player ===
De La Salle College

- Corn Uí Mhuirí: 1964, 1965

St Mary's Rosslare

- Wexford Junior A Football Championship: 1975

Newmarket-on-Fergus

- Clare Senior Hurling Championship: 1967, 1968, 1969
- Clare Under-21 Hurling Championship: 1967

Wexford District

- Wexford Senior Football Championship: 1977

Wexford

- Leinster Intermediate Hurling Championship: 1965
- All-Ireland Under-21 Hurling Championship: 1965
- Leinster Under-21 Hurling Championship: 1965

=== Management ===
Wexford District

- Wexford Senior Football Championship: 1977

Wexford

- All-Ireland Senior Hurling Championship: 1996
- Leinster Senior Hurling Championship: 1996

In 2024, Liam Griffin was conferred with the degree of Doctor of the University honoris causa by South East Technological University in recognition of his outstanding achievements for the community and the economy of Wexford.

== Sources ==
- Corry, Eoghan, The GAA Book of Lists (Hodder Headline Ireland, 2005).
- Walsh, Denis, Hurling: the Revolution Years (Penguin Ireland, 2005).

Sporting positions
Preceded by Christy Keogh	Wexford Senior Hurling Manager; 1994-1997	Succeeded by Rory Kinsella
Achievements
Preceded by Ger Loughnane	All-Ireland SHC winning manager 1996	Succeeded by Ger Loughnane
