= Rod Guiney =

Irish hurler

Personal information
- Native name: Ruairí Mac Géibheannaigh (Irish)
- Born: 19 March 1970 (age 56) Rosslare, County Wexford, Ireland
- Occupation: Financial consultant

Sport
- Sport: Hurling
- Position: Right wing-back
Clubs
- Years: Club
- St Mary's Rosslare; Rathnure
Club titles
- Wexford titles: 4
- Leinster titles: 1
- All-Ireland Titles: 0
Inter-county
- Years: County
- 1991-2001: Wexford
Inter-county titles
- Leinster titles: 2
- All-Irelands: 1
- NHL: 0
- All Stars: 0

Roderick P. Guiney (born 19 March 1970) is an Irish former hurler. At club level, he played with St Mary's Rosslare and Rathnure and at inter-county level was a member of the Wexford senior hurling team.

== Career ==
Guiney first played hurling to a high standard as a student at St Peter's College in Wexford. He lined out in all grades during his time there, including the Leinster Colleges SAHC.

At club level, Guiney first played for the St Mary's Rosslare club before transferring to Rathnure in 1995. He went on to win four Wexford SHC titles between 1996 and 2003, as well as a Leinster Club SHC medal in 1998. Guiney was also part of the Rathnure team beaten by St Joseph's Doora-Barefield in the 1999 All-Ireland club final. He ended his club career playing with Rathnure's junior team.

Guiney first appeared on the inter-county scene with Wexford as a member of the under-21 team. He made his senior team debut in a National Hurling League game against Clare in October 1991. Guiney won a Leinster SHC medal in 1996, before playing at right wing-back when Wexford beat Limerick in the 1996 All-Ireland final.

After being appointed team captain in 1997, Guiney won a second consecutive Leinster SHC medal. A cruciate ligament injury, the second of his career, resulted in him missing most of the 1998 season. Guiney retired from inter-county hurling in 2001.

== Personal life ==
Guiney's twin brother, Dave Guiney, was also a member of Wexford's All-Ireland-winning team in 1996. His father, Jack Guiney, played rugby union for Ireland. His nephew, also called Jack Guiney, played hurling for Wexford.

== Honours ==
Rathnure

- Leinster Senior Club Hurling Championship: 1998
- Wexford Senior Hurling Championship: 1996, 1998, 2002, 2003

Wexford

- All-Ireland Senior Hurling Championship: 1996
- Leinster Senior Hurling Championship: 1996, 1997 (c)

Sporting positions
Preceded by Martin Storey	Wexford senior hurling team captain 1997	Succeeded by Martin Storey
