= Ciara Storey =

Irish camogie player

Personal information
- Native name: Ciara Ní Stóirí (Irish)
- Born: 7 January 1990 (age 36) Wexford, Ireland

Sport
- Sport: Camogie
- Position: Forward
Club*
Years	Club	Apps (scores)
	Oulart–The Ballagh	?
Inter-county**
Years	County	Apps (scores)
	Wexford	?
Inter-county titles
- All-Irelands: 2
- * club appearances and scores correct as of (16:31, 30 Sept 2011 (UTC)). **Inter County team apps and scores correct as of (16:31, 30 Sept 2011 (UTC)).

Ciara Storey is a camogie player, winner of All-Ireland Senior medals in 2010 and 2011.

== Family background ==
Ciara is the daughter of Martin Storey, Wexford's All-Ireland winning Senior hurling captain of 1996.

== Other awards ==
National Camogie League medals in 2009, 2010 and 2011; National League Div two 2009. Leinster Championship 2009, 2010, 2011. Three All-Ireland Féile na nGael 2000, 2001, 2002; Winner of Leinster and All-Ireland Senior medals in Colleges with Coláiste Bríde\ 2003, 2004, 2005; All Ireland Colleges Camogie Championship with [http://www.colaistebride.ie/ Coláiste Bríde 2004; Club Senior 2003, 2004, 2005, 2006, 2007, 2009; Leinster Club Senior 2009; All Ireland club sevens 2006; Leinster Under-14 2002.
