= St Mary's Rosslare GAA =

Gaelic sports club in County Wexford, Ireland

St Mary's Rosslare
- Naomh Mhuire Rosláir
- Founded: 1886
- County: Wexford
- Colours: Blue and yellow
- Grounds: Paddy Roche Centre, Tagoat, Wexford
- Coordinates: 52°14′37.8″N 6°23′58.1″W

Playing kits
Standard colours

Senior Club Championships
	All Ireland	Leinster champions	Wexford champions
Football:	-	-	1

St Mary's Rosslare are a Gaelic Athletic Association club in County Wexford. St Mary's were the first winners of the Wexford Senior Football Championship in 1886 under the name of Rosslare Tigers.

== History ==
St Mary's Rosslare was founded in 1886. The parish includes from Kilrane, Rosslare Harbour, Tagoat and Rosslare Strand. They won the first ever Wexford Senior Football Championship, beating Crossabeg Ballymurn GAA in the final in 1886.

As of 2020, St Mary's Rosslare had four adult teams, two hurling (Intermediate 'A' and Junior 'B') and two football (Intermediate and Junior 'B').

The club's logo was designed by Ray Wickham. He took inspiration from a banner designed by nuns in the local convent for a féile competition. The lighthouse represents Tuskar Lighthouse, blue for the sea and yellow for the sand. The nightboat represents the James Stephen Lightboat which rescued crew members from a Norwegian schooner (the Mexico) in 1914. For the efforts of Wickham and Duggan, they received an All Ireland Hurling Medal. This is the only time outside the field of play that medals have been awarded.

== Facilities ==
The club's main playing field and training centre is the Paddy Roche Centre at Tagoat, approximately 15 km south of Wexford town and 5 km from Rosslare Europort.

== Honours ==
- Wexford Senior Football Championship (1): 1886
- Wexford Intermediate Football Championship (3): 1985, 2005, 2010
- Wexford Intermediate 'A' Football Championship (1): 2023
- Wexford Junior Football Championship (1): 1975
- Wexford Junior Hurling Championship (3): 1934, 1999, 2019
- Wexford Junior B Hurling Championship (1): 1984

== Notable players ==
- Liam Griffin (hurler)
- David Murphy
- Rod Guiney
- Dave Guiney
- Willie Devereux
