= Larry Murphy (hurler) =

Irish hurler (born 1972)

Personal information
- Native name: Labhrás Ó Murchú (Irish)
- Born: 1972 (age 53–54) Clonroche, County Wexford, Ireland
- Occupation: Sales rep
- Height: 6 ft 0 in (183 cm)

Sport
- Sport: Hurling
- Position: Right corner-forward
Club
- Years: Club
- Cloughbawn
Club titles
- Wexford titles: 1
Inter-county
Years	County	Apps (scores)
1993-2004	Wexford	34 (6-39)
Inter-county titles
- Leinster titles: 3
- All-Irelands: 1
- NHL: 0
- All Stars: 1

Larry Murphy (born 1972) is an Irish former hurler. At club level, he played with Cloughbawn and at inter-county level was a member of the Wexford senior hurling team.

== Career ==
Murphy first played hurling and Gaelic football to a high standard as a student at Good Counsel College in New Ross. He lined out in all grades as a dual player during his time there and won Wexford Colleges U14HC and U16HC titles.

At club level, Murphy first played for the Cloughbawn club in the juvenile and underage grades before progressing to adult level. He scored 1-02 from right wing-forward when Cloughbawn won the Wexford SHC title in 1993 following a defeat of Rapparees in a final replay.

Murphy first appeared on the inter-county scene with Wexford as a member of the minor team in 1990. He later had three unsuccessful seasons with the under-21 team. Murphy made his senior team debut in a National Hurling League game against Limerick in April 1993. He won a Leinster SHC medal in 1996, before playing at left wing-forward when Wexford beat Limerick in the 1996 All-Ireland final. Murphy ended the season with an All-Star award.

A second Leinster SHC medal followed for Murphy in 1997, when Wexford retained the title after a defeat of Kilkenny. He claimed a third Leinster winner's medal in 2004. Murphy retired from inter-county hurling in November 2004.

== Honours ==
Cloughbawn

- Wexford Senior Hurling Championship: 1993

Wexford

- All-Ireland Senior Hurling Championship: 1996
- Leinster Senior Hurling Championship: 1996, 1997, 2004

Sporting positions
Preceded by Tom Dempsey	Wexford senior hurling team captain 1994	Succeeded by Liam Dunne
