= Johnny Brenner =

Irish hurler

Personal information
- Native name: Séan Brenner (Irish)
- Born: Waterford City

Sport
- Sport: Hurling
- Position: Midfield
Club
- Years: Club
- 1980s - 2000s: De La Salle
Inter-county
- Years: County
- 1990s-2001: Waterford
Inter-county titles
- Munster titles: 0
- All-Irelands: 0
- All Stars: 0

Johnny Brenner (born 1971) is a retired Irish hurling midfielder who formerly played with De La Salle GAA at club level and with Waterford GAA at inter-county level.

Johnny was part of Waterford's 1992 All-Ireland Under 21 Hurling Championship winning team. Johnny also played at senior level for Waterford GAA until 1998, making a brief return for the 2001 All-Ireland Hurling Championship.

== Honours ==
- All-Ireland Under 21 Hurling Championship winner - 1992
- Munster Under-21 Hurling Championship winner - 1992
