= 1995–96 National Hurling League =

65th season of the National Hurling League

League details
- Dates: 7 October 1995 – 12 May 1996
- Teams: 32

League champions
- Winners: Galway (6th win)
- Captain: Michael Coleman
- Manager: Mattie Murphy

League runners-up
- Runners-up: Tipperary
- Captain: Michael Cleary
- Manager: Tom Fogarty

Other division winners
- Division 2: Wexford
- Division 3: London
- Division 4: Donegal

The 1995–96 National Hurling League, known for sponsorship reasons as the Church & General National Hurling League, was the 65th edition of the National Hurling League, which ran from 7 October 1995 until 12 May 1996. Galway won, beating Tipperary in the final.

== Structure ==
There are eight teams in each division. Each plays each other team once, home or away, and receives two points for a win and one for a draw.

The top two teams in Division 1 advance to the semi-finals. The third- and fourth-placed teams in Division 1 go into the quarter-finals, as do the top two teams in Division 2.

The top two teams in Divisions 2, 3 and 4 are promoted for the following season. The bottom two in Divisions 1, 2 and 3 are relegated.

== Division 1 ==
=== Table ===
Team	Pld	W	D	L	Pts	Status
Galway	7	5	1	1	12	Advance to semi-finals
Tipperary	7	5	0	2	10	Advance to semi-finals
Kilkenny	7	5	0	2	10	Advance to quarter-finals
Offaly	7	3	0	4	6	Advance to quarter-finals
Cork	7	3	0	4	6
Clare	7	2	1	3	5
Kerry	7	1	0	6	2	Relegated
Waterford	7	1	0	6	2	Relegated

=== Group stage ===
7 October 1995	Kerry	3-7 - 1-8	Clare	Austin Stack Park, Tralee
	T Maunsell 1-2, P O'Connell 1-0, B O'Sullivan 1-0, M Hennessy 0-3, M Foley 0-1, B O'Mahony 0-1.		J McInerney 1-0, J Healy 0-3, F Tuohy 0-2, O Baker 0-1, F Hegarty 0-1, S McNamara 0-1.	Referee: G Harrington (Cork)

7 October 1995	Waterford	2-8 - 0-17	Kilkenny	Walsh Park, Waterford
	M Hickey 1-2, M O'Sullivan 1-0, J Brenner 0-2, P Queally 0-2, B Walsh 0-2.		C Carter 0-7, P Barry 0-3, C Brennan 0-2, D Gaffney 0-2, C Phelan 0-1, P Farrell 0-1, B Leahy 0-1.	Referee: D Murphy (Wexford)

7 October 1995	Galway	0-16 - 0-10	Cork	Kenny Park, Athenry
	C Moran 0-7, J Rabbitte 0-4, L Burke 0-4, K Broderick 0-1.		G Manley 0-5, B Corcoran 0-3, K Morrison 0-1, D O'Mahony 0-1.	Referee: S McMahon (Clare)

8 October 1995	Offaly	1-14 - 0-11	Tipperary	St. Brendan's Park, Birr
	Joe Dooley 1-3, Johnny Dooley 0-4, B Dooley 0-3, B Whelehan 0-1, K Martin 0-1, P O'Connor 0-1, D Pilkington 0-1.		D Ryan 0-3, P Fox 0-2, T Dunne 0-2, L McGrath 0-1, G Maguire 0-1, D Burke 0-1, B Ryan 0-1.	Attendance: 8,000; Referee: A Mac Suibhne (Dublin)

22 October 1995	Kilkenny	0-12 - 1-12	Galway	Nowlan Park, Kilkenny
	DJ Carey 0-8, J Brennan 0-1, J Power 0-1, D Cleere 0-1, B Ryan 0-1.		L Burke 1-6, M Kenny 0-2, M Coleman 0-1, C Moran 0-1, B Keogh 0-1, J Rabbitte 0-1.	Referee: P O'Connor (Limerick)

22 October 1995	Clare	3-8 - 1-7	Waterford	Cusack Park, Ennis
	F Hegarty 2-0, PJ O'Connell 1-2, J O'Connor 0-4, C Clancy 0-1, C Lynch 0-1.		M O'Sullivan 1-2, S Daly 0-1, P Flynn 0-1, J Brenner 0-1, P Queally 0-1, F Hartley 0-1.	Referee: F O'Loughlin

22 October 1995	Tipperary	3-10 - 1-7	Kerry	Seán Treacy Park, Tipperary
	T Dunne 0-5, K Tucker 1-1, D Ryan 1-0, C Bonnar 1-0, R Ryan 0-1, T Moloney 0-1, P Fox 0-1, D Burke 0-1.		T Maunsell 1-1, M Hennessy 0-4, B O'Sullivan 0-1, C Walsh 0-1.	Referee: P Ahern (Carlow)

5 November 1995	Offaly	1-7 - 0-15	Clare	St. Brendan's Park, Birr
	B Whelehan 1-2, D Pilkington 0-3, M Duignan 0-2.		R O'Hara 0-3, J O'Connor 0-3, F Hegarty 0-2, S McMahon 0-2, F Tuohy 0-2, S McNamara 0-1, C Lynch 0-1, PJ O'Connell 0-1.	Referee: W Barrett (Limerick)

5 November 1995	Galway	0-12 - 2-8	Tipperary	Ballinasloe
	M Kenny 0-7, M Coleman 0-2, L Burke 0-2, J Rabbitte 0-1.		T Dunne 0-6, D Burke 1-1, A Ryan 1-0, P Fox 0-1.	Referee: S O'Meara (Offaly)

5 November 1995	Kerry	1-5 - 0-12	Kilkenny	Austin Stack Park, Tralee
	B O'Sullivan 1-0, M Hennessy 0-3, P O'Connell 0-2.		DJ Carey 0-8, B Ryan 0-3, C Carter 0-1.	Referee: S McMahon (Clare)

5 November 1995	Waterford	0-8 - 1-15	Cork	Fraher Field, Dungarvan
	M Hickey 0-4, B O'Sullivan 0-2, T Browne 0-1, P Queally 0-1.		B Corcoran 0-10, A Browne 1-1, G Manley 0-3, D O'Connell 0-1.	Referee: P Dunphy (Kilkenny)

19 November 1995	Kilkenny	0-8 - 1-9	Offaly	Nowlan Park, Kilkenny
	DJ Carey 0-3, Brendan Ryan 0-2, B Barcoe 0-1, D O'Neill 0-1, A Lawlor 0-1.		A Mannion 1-1, JOhnny Dooley 0-5, D Regan 0-1, P O'Connor 0-1, M Duignan 0-1.	Referee: D Murphy (Wexford)

19 November 1995	Cork	2-16 - 1-13	Kerry	Páirc Uí Chaoimh, Cork
	B Corcoran 1-6, A Browne 1-1, Mick Mullins 0-4, Mark Mullins 0-3, J Deane 0-1, F McCormack 0-1.		M Hennessy 0-7, J O'Sullivan 1-1, C Walsh 0-3, T Maunsell 0-1, B O'Sullivan 0-1.

19 November 1995	Clare	2-7 - 0-13	Galway	Cusack Park, Ennis
	R O'Hara 2-0, J O'Connor 0-2, S McMahon 0-2, F Tuohy 0-1, F Hegarty 0-1.		F Forde 0-6, K Broderick 0-2, B Keogh 0-2, C Moore 0-2, M McGrath 0-1.	Referee: J McDonnell (Tipperary)

19 November 1995	Tipperary	2-17 - 2-11	Waterford	Semple Stadium, Thurles
	P Fox 0-6, T Dunne 0-5, G Maguire 0-4, D Ryan 1-0, C Gleeson 0-1, J Leahy 0-1.		M Hickey 1-6, J Beresford 1-0, T Browne 0-3, P Queally 0-1, T Fives 0-1.	Referee: P Horan (Offaly)

3 December 1995	Cork	2-11 - 0-10	Offaly	Páirc Uí Rinn, Cork
	B Corcoran 0-6, J Deane 1-1, A Browne 1-0, D O'Connell 0-1, G Manley 0-1, M O'Connell 0-1, Mick Mullins 0-1.		Johnny Dooley 0-7, A Mannion 0-2, B Whelehan 0-1.	Referee: T Murray (Limerick)

18 February 1996	Clare	0-9 - 2-7	Kilkenny	Cusack Park, Ennis
	J O'Connor 0-2, F Hegarty 0-2, O Baker 0-1, S McMahon 0-1, Ger O'Loughlin 0-1, B Murphy 0-1, PJ O'Connell 0-1,		C Carter 1-1, P Farrell 1-1, DJ Carey 0-2, D Gaffney 0-2, D Byrne 0-1.	Referee: W Barrett (Tipperary)

18 February 1996	Cork	1-8 - 1-15	Tipperary	Páirc Uí Rinn, Cork
	B Corcoran 0-7, J Deane 1-0, K McGuckin 0-1.		M Cleary 0-6, D Rourke 1-1, E Tucker 0-2, R Ryan 0-2, D Rayn 0-1, A Ryan 0-1, B O'Meara 0-1, L Cahill 0-1.	Referee: D Murphy (Wexford)

18 February 1996	Kerry	0-3 - 1-5	Waterford	Fitzgerald Stadium, Killarney
	P O'Connell 0-2, P Healy 0-1.		S Daly 1-1, B O'Sullivan 0-1, P Flynn 0-1, M Hickey 0-1, J Brenner 0-1.	Referee: P Horan (Offaly)

18 February 1996	Galway	1-28 - 1-1	Offaly	Ballinasloe
	J Rabbitte 1-4, F Forde 0-7, L Burke 0-5, C Moran 0-3, M Coleman 0-4, B Keogh 0-2, K Broderick 0-2, N Shaughnessy 0-1.		J Errity 1-0, J Troy 0-1.	Referee: P Aherne (Carlow)

3 March 1996	Kilkenny	1-16 - 3-8	Cork	Nowlan Park, Kilkenny
	C Carter 1-4, DJ Carey 0-3, D Gaffney 0-3, D Byrne 0-2, D O'Neill 0-2, A Ronan 0-1, M Phelan 0-1.		B Corcoran 1-3, G Manley 1-1, A Browne 1-1, B Egan 0-1, M Mullins 0-1, J Cashman 0-1.	Referee: A Mac Suibhne (Dublin)

3 March 1996	Tipperary	0-16 - 2-9	Clare	Semple Stadium, Thurles
	M Cleary 0-5, K Tucker 0-3, R Ryan 0-2, T Dunne 0-2, E Tucker 0-2, D Ryan 0-1, D Bourke 0-1.		B Murphy 2-0, G O'Loughlin 0-3, E Taaffe 0-2, PJ O'Connell 0-2, S McMahon 0-1, L Doyle 0-1.	Referee: P Delaney (Laois)

3 March 1996	Offaly	1-8 - 0-10	Kerry	St. Brendan's Park, Birr
	P O'Connor 1-0, B Whelehan 0-3, Joe Dooley 0-2, B Dooley 0-1, D Pilkington 0-1, S Grennan 0-1.		M Foley 0-7, C Walsh 0-2, Jerry O'Sullivan 0-1.	Referee: T McIntyre (Antrim)

3 March 1996	Waterford	1-13 - 1-15	Galway	Fraher Field, Dungarvan
	M Hickey 0-5, S Daly 1-0, J Beresford 0-3, J Brenner 0-2, P Flynn 0-2, K McGrath 0-1.		J Cooney 1-3, C Moore 0-3, F Forde 0-3, B Keogh 0-2, K Broderick 0-2, M Coleman 0-1, J Rabbitte 0-1.	Referee: J McDonnell (Tipperary)

24 March 1996	Kerry	0-8 - 1-13	Galway	Fitzgerald Stadium, Killarney
	M Foley 0-3, C Walsh 0-2, P O'Connell 0-1, TJ Curran 0-1, T Maunsell 0-1.		F Forde 1-5, J Cooney 0-3, K Broderick 0-2, C Moore 0-1, M O'Donoghue 0-1, P Kelly 0-1.	Referee: P O'Connor (Limerick)

24 March 1996	Waterford	0-8 - 0-16	Offaly	Fraher Field, Dungarvan
	M Hickey 0-5, T Fives 0-1, B O'Sullivan 0-1, K McGrath 0-1.		Johnny Dooley 0-8, B Dooley 0-3, J Pilkington 0-2, D Pilkington 0-2, J Troy 0-1.	Referee: P Delaney (Laois)

24 March 1996	Kilkenny	0-14 - 1-10	Tipperary	Semple Stadium, Thurles
	A Ronan 0-10, C Carter 0-2, P Delaney 0-1, D Gaffney 0-1.		K Tucker 0-4, D Ryan 1-0, C Gleeson 0-2, M Cleary 0-1, P Dwyer 0-1, M Ryan 0-1, L Cahill 0-1.	Referee: D Murphy (Wexford)

24 March 1996	Cork	0-5 - 1-11	Clare	Páirc Uí Chaoimh, Cork
	G Manley 0-4, B Egan 0-1.		J O'Connor 0-4, PJ O'Connell 1-0, S McMahon 0-2, D Fitzgerald 0-1, R O'Hara 0-1, F Hegarty 0-1, B Murphy 0-1, G O'Loughlin 0-1.	Referee: A Mac Suibhne (Dublin)

=== Knock-out stage ===
Quarter-finals

14 April 1996 Quarter-final	Laois	2-10 – 1-11	Kilkenny	Semple Stadium, Thurles
	S Cuddy 2-0, D Cuddy 0-4, PJ Cuddy 0-2, O Coss 0-1, D Rooney 0-1, T Kenna 0-1, F O'Sullivan 0-1.		C Carter 1-1, P O'Neill 0-3, DJ Carey 0-2, A Ronan 0-2, J Power 0-1, C Brennan 0-1, D Byrne 0-1.	Attendance: 15,573; Referee: S McMahon (Clare)

14 April 1996 Quarter-final	Wexford	1-14 – 2-3	Offaly	Semple Stadium, Thurles
	L Murphy 1-1, T Dempsey 0-4, T Kehoe 0-3, M Storey 0-3, G Laffan 0-2, P Codd 0-1.		D Pilkington 1-0, J Errity 1-0, J Troy 0-2, Joe Dooley 0-1.	Attendance: 15,573; Referee: A Mac Suibhne (Dublin)

Semi-finals

28 April 1996 Semi-final	Tipperary	1-13 – 1-11	Laois	Nowlan Park, Kilkenny
	J Leahy 1-4, M Cleary 0-3, B O'Meara 0-2, E Tucker 0-2, D Ryan 0-1, P Fox 0-1.		D Cuddy 0-5, R Cashin 1-0, D Conroy 0-3, N Rigney 0-2, D Rooney 0-1.	Attendance: 17,000; Referee: D Murphy (Wexford)

28 April 1996 Semi-final	Galway	2-15 – 1-10	Wexford	Gaelic Grounds, Limerick
	F Forde 1-5, J Rabbitte 0-5, Peter Kelly 1-0, C Moore 0-2, J Cooney 0-2, K Broderick 0-1, L Burke 0-1.	Report	J O'Connor 1-0, M Storey 0-3, G Laffan 0-2, T Kehoe 0-2, A Fenlon 0-1, L Dunne 0-1, P Codd 0-1.	Attendance: 7,570; Referee: P O'Connor (Limerick)

Final

12 May 1996 Final	Galway	2-10 – 2-8	Tipperary	Gaelic Grounds, Limerick
	K Broderick 1-0, J Cooney 1-0, F Forde 0-3, B Keogh 0-2, J Rabbitte 0-2, C Moore 0-2, L Burke 0-1.		J Leahy 0-8, N English 1-0, B Ryan 1-0.	Attendance: 25,100; Referee: P O'Connor (Limerick)

=== Scoring statistics ===
Top scorers overall

Rank	Player	Team	Tally	Total	Matches	Average
1	Brian Corcoran	Cork	2-35	41	6	6.83
2	Francis Forde	Galway	2-29	35		
3	Micheal Hickey	Waterford	2-23	29		
4	D. J. Carey	Kilkenny	0-26	26		
5	Charlie Carter	Kilkenny	3-16	25		
6	Johnny Dooley	Offaly	0-24	24		
7	Liam Burke	Galway	1-19	22		
8	Joe Rabbitte	Galway	1-18	21		
9	Tommy Dunne	Tipperary	0-20	20		

Top scorers in a single game

Rank	Player	Team	Tally	Total	Opposition
1	Brian Corcoran	Cork	0-10	10	Waterford
1	Adrian Ronan	Kilkenny	0-10	10	Tipperary
3	Liam Burke	Galway	1-06	9	Kilkenny
3	Brian Corcoran	Cork	1-06	9	Kerry
3	Michael Hickey	Waterford	1-06	9	Tipperary
6	Francis Forde	Galway	1-05	8	Kerry
6	Francis Forde	Galway	1-05	8	Wexford
6	D. J. Carey	Kilkenny	0-08	8	Galway
6	D. J. Carey	Kilkenny	0-08	8	Clare
6	Johnny Dooley	Offaly	0-08	8	Waterford
6	John Leahy	Tipperary	0-08	8	Galway

== Division 2 ==
=== Table ===
Team	Pld	W	D	L	Pts	Status
Wexford	7	6	0	1	12	Promoted and advance to quarter-finals
Laois	7	5	0	2	10	Promoted and advance to quarter-finals
Limerick	7	5	0	2	10
Antrim	7	4	0	3	8
Dublin	7	2	1	4	5
Westmeath	7	2	1	4	5
Down	7	0	2	5	2	Relegated
Meath	7	1	0	6	2	Relegated
