= 1996 All-Ireland Senior Hurling Championship =

Championship details
- Dates: 5 May – 1 September 1996
- Teams: 21

All-Ireland champions
- Winning team: Wexford (6th win)
- Captain: Martin Storey
- Manager: Liam Griffin

All-Ireland Finalists
- Losing team: Limerick
- Captain: Ciarán Carey
- Manager: Tom Ryan

Provincial champions
- Munster: Limerick
- Leinster: Wexford
- Ulster: Antrim
- Connacht: Galway

Championship statistics
- No. matches played: 22
- Top Scorer: Gary Kirby (1–35)
- Player of the Year: Larry O'Gorman
- All-Star Team: See here

The 1996 All-Ireland Senior Hurling Championship was the 110th staging of the All-Ireland Senior Hurling Championship, the Gaelic Athletic Association's premier inter-county hurling tournament. The draw for the various provincial championships took place on 22 October 1995. The championship ran from 5 May to 1 September 1996.

Clare were the defending champions, however, they were beaten by Limerick in the Munster semi-finals.

The All-Ireland final was played on 1 September 1996 at Croke Park in Dublin, between Wexford and Limerick, in what was their third meeting in the final overall, a first meeting in the final in 78 years and a first championship meeting in 41 years. Wexford won the match by 1–13 to 0–14 to claim their sixth All-Ireland title overall and a first title in 26 years.

Limerick's Gary Kirby was the championship's top scorer with 1–35. Wexford's Larry O'Gorman was named Hurler of the Year.

== Team changes ==
=== To Championship ===
Promoted from the All-Ireland Senior B Hurling Championship

- Derry (qualified)

Entered Championship

- New York

=== From Championship ===
Regraded to the All-Ireland Senior B Hurling Championship

- None

== Teams ==
=== Personnel and kits ===
Province	Team	Colours	Sponsor	Captain	Manager	Most recent success		
Province	Team	Colours	Sponsor	Captain	Manager	All-Ireland	Provincial	League
Leinster	Carlow	Red, green and yellow			Moling Morrissey			
	Dublin	Navy and blue	Arnotts		Jimmy Gray	1938	1961	1938–39
	Kilkenny	Black and amber	Avonmore	Michael Phelan	Nickey Brennan	1993	1993	1994–95
	Laois	Blue and white	Esso Ultron		Michael "Babs" Keating	1915	1949	
	Meath	Green and gold	Kepak		John Davis			
	Offaly	Green, white and gold	Carroll Meats	Shane McGuckin	Éamonn Cregan	1995	1994	1990–91
	Westmeath	Maroon and white	Bennett Construction		Georgie Leahy			
	Wexford	Purple and gold	Wexford Creamery	Martin Storey	Liam Griffin	1996	2019	1973
Munster	Clare	Saffron and blue	Pat O'Donnell	Anthony Daly	Ger Loughnane	1995	1995	1977–78
	Cork	Red and white	Barry's Tea	Mark Mullins	Jimmy Barry-Murphy	1990	1992	1992–93
	Kerry	Green and yellow	Kerry Group		John Meyler	1891	1891	
	Limerick	Green and white	Shaws	Ciarán Carey	Tom Ryan	1973	1994	1991–92
	Tipperary	Blue and gold	Finches	Michael Cleary	Tom Fogarty	1991	1993	1993–94
	Waterford	White and blue	Tedcastles Oil	Fergal Hartley	Tony Mansfield	1959	1963	1962–63
Connacht	Galway	Maroon and white	Supermac's	Michael Coleman	Mattie Murphy	1988	1995	1995–96
	Roscommon	Blue and yellow	747 Travel		Michael Kelly			
Ulster	Antrim	Saffron and white	Matbro		Dominic McKinley		1994	
	Down	Red and black	No sponsor		Paddy Braniff; Brian Gilmore; Gerard Lennon		1995	
	Derry							
Britain	London							
North America	New York							

== Provincial championships ==
=== Connacht Senior Hurling Championship ===
July 6
Final

Roscommon	2–10 – 3–19	Galway
C. Kelly (0–5), R. Mulry (1–1), R. Dooley (1–0), P. Feeney (0–1), J. Mannion (0–1), D. Lohan (0–1), M. Cunniffe (0–1).		F. Forde (2–8), K. Broderick (1–2), J. Cooney (0–3), L. Burke (0–3), M. Donoghue (0–1), M. Coleman (0–1), J. Rabbitte (0–1).

Dr. Hyde Park, Roscommon
Referee: P. Horan (Offaly)

=== Ulster Senior Hurling Championship ===
July 14
Final

Antrim	1–20 – 2–12	Down
A. McCloskey (0–7), Gregory O'Kane (1–2), A. Elliott (0–2), P. Jennings (0–2), Gary O'Kane (0–2), J. Connolly (0–2), P. McKillen (0–2), S. P. McKillop (0–1).		D. O'Prey (1–4), N. Sands (1–3), M. McGrattan (0–2), M. Braniff (0–1), P. Coulter (0–1), M. Coulter, Snr (0–1).

Casement Park, Belfast
Referee: P. Aherne (Carlow)

=== Leinster Senior Hurling Championship ===
Preliminary round
Carlow	1–15, 2–08
Westmeath	2–12, 3–07

First round
Meath	2–11
Westmeath	1–05

Quarter-finals
Offaly	2–18
Meath	2–12
Wexford	1–14
Kilkenny	0–14

Semi-finals
Offaly	4–17
Laois	2–10
Dublin	1–09
Wexford	2–12

Leinster Final
Offaly	2–15
Wexford	2–23

May 5
Preliminary round 1

Carlow	1–15 – 2–12	Westmeath
N. English (1–9), P. Coady (0–2), J. Kavanagh (0–2), B. Murphy (0–1), V. English (0–1).		S. McLoughlin (1–6), R. Galvin (1–1), B. Kennedy (0–2), P. Galvin (0–1), P. Connaughton (0–1), P. Clancy (0–1).

Castletown-Geoghegan
Referee: J. Guinan (Kilkenny)

May 19
Preliminary round 1 replay

Carlow	2–8 – 3–7	Westmeath
J. Byrne (2–2), P. Coady (0–2), N. English (0–2), S. Spruhan (0–1), M. Farrell (0–1).		B. Kennedy (1–1), S. McLoughlin (1–1), P. Connaughton (1–0), P. Clancy (0–2), R. Galvin (0–2), P. Galvin (0–1).

Dr. Cullen Park, Carlow
Referee: J. Guinan (Kilkenny)

May 26
Preliminary round 2

Meath	2–11 – 1–5	Westmeath
D. Martin (0–6), M. Cole (1–1), N. Horan (1–1), P. Cahill (0–1), W. Donnelly (0–1), P. Potterton (0–1).		P. Galvin (1–1), S. McLoughlin (0–2), R. Galvin (0–1), B. Kennedy (0–1).

Castletown-Geoghegan
Referee: P. Dunphy (Kilkenny)

June 2
Quarter-Final

Offaly	2–18 – 2–12	Meath
Johnny Dooley (0–7), D. Pilkington (1–1), J. Errity (1–0), J. Troy (0–3), B. Dooley (0–3), J. Pilkington (0–2), Joe Dooley (0–2).		D. Martin (1–6), M. Cole (1–0), N. Horan (0–2), P. Donnelly (0–1), B. Murray (0–1), W. Donnelly (0–1), D. Murray (0–1).

Croke Park, Dublin
Referee: P. Delaney (Laois)

June 2
Quarter-Final

Wexford	1–14 – 0–14	Kilkenny
M. Storey (0–5), B. Byrne (1–0), E. Scallan (0–3), A. Fenlon (0–2), P. Codd (0–1), R. McCarthy (0–1), L. Dunne (0–1), L. O'Gorman (0–1).		A. Lawlor (0–3), C. Brennan (0–3), M. Phelan (0–2), J. Power (0–2), P. J. Delaney (0–1), D. J. Carey (0–1), S. Ryan (0–1), P. Larkin (0–1).

Croke Park, Dublin
Referee: A. Mac Suibhne (Dublin)

June 23
Semi-Final

Dublin	1–9 – 2–12	Wexford
J. Twomey (0–4), E. Morrissey (1–0), C. McCann (0–2), K. Flynn (0–2), J. Brennan (0–1).		G. Laffan (1–2), E. Scallan (0–4), D. Fitzhenry (1–0), M. Storey (0–2), L. Murphy (0–1), T. Dempsey (0–1), S. Flood (0–1), A. Fenlon (0–1).

Croke Park, Dublin
Attendance: 30,008
Referee: P. Horan (Offaly)

June 23
Semi-Final

Offaly	4–17 – 2–10	Laois
J. Troy (2–2), Johnny Dooley (0–8), J. Errity (2–0), Joe Dooley (0–2), B. Dooley (0–2), D. Pilkington (0–1), B. Whelehan (0–1), J. Pilkington (0–1).		D. Cuddy (0–6), N. Delaney (1–1), P. J. Cuddy (1–0), O. Coss (0–3).

Croke Park, Dublin
Attendance: 30,008
Referee: P. Aherne (Carlow)

July 14
Final

Wexford	2–23 – 2–15	Offaly
T. Dempsey (1–05 ), M. Storey (0–5), E. Scallan (0–4), L. Murphy (0–4), D. Fitzhenry (1–0), R. McCarthy (0–3), L. O'Gorman (0–2).	Report	B. Dooley (1–2), M. Duignan (1–1), Johnny Dooley (0–4), J. Pilkington (0–4), Joe dooley (0–3), D. Pilkington (0–1).

Croke Park, Dublin
Attendance: 34,365

=== Munster Senior Hurling Championship ===
May 26
Quarter-Final

Cork	1–8 – 3–18	Limerick
A. Browne (1–1), B. Egan (0–3), K. Murray (0–1), J. Cashman (0–1), B. Corcoran (0–1), S. McCarthy (0–1).		P. Tobin (2–0), G. Kirby (0–6), O. O'Neill (1–1), T. J. Ryan (0–4), M. Galligan (0–2), M. Houlihan (0–2), D. Quigley (0–1), Seán O'Neill (0–1), C. Carey (0–1).

Páirc Uí Chaoimh, Cork
Referee: W. Barrett (Tipperary)

June 2
Quarter-Final

Waterford	1–11 – 1–14	Tipperary
P. Flynn (1–5), J. Brenner (0–3), T. Fives (0–1), P. Queally (0–1), K. McGrath (0–1).		L. Cahill (1–2), M. Cleary (0–4), T. Dunne (0–4), N. English (0–2), L. McGrath (0–1), J. Leahy (0–1).

Walsh Park, Waterford
Attendance: 15,655
Referee: D. Murphy (Wexford)

June 15
Semi-Final

Kerry	2–11 – 4–19	Tipperary
Jerry O'Sullivan (1–2), M. McKivergan (1–0), M. Hennessy (0–3), C. Walsh (0–3), P. O'Connell (0–1), C. Ross (0–1), L. O'Connor (0–1).		J. Leahy (2–2), L. Cahill (1–4), T. Dunne (1–3), M. Kennedy (0–3), M. Cleary (0–3), D. Ryan (0–1), P. Fox (0–1), A. Butler (0–1), N. English (0–1).

Austin Stack Park, Tralee
Attendance: 4,300
Referee: J. O'Leary (Cork)

June 16
Semi-Final

Limerick	1–13 – 0–15	Clare
G. Kirby (1–7), B. Foley (0–2), M. Galligan (0–1), T. J. Ryan (0–1), C. Carey (0–1), M. Houlihan (0–1).	Report	J. O'Connor (0–5), S. McMahon (0–3), F. Tuohy (0–3), G. O'Loughlin (0–2), E. Taaffe (0–2).

Gaelic Grounds, Limerick
Attendance: 43,534
Referee: W. Barrett (Tipperary)

July 7
Final

Limerick	0–19 – 1–16	Tipperary
G. Kirby (0–10), T. J. Ryan (0–3), F. Carroll (0–2), M. Galligan (0–1), O. O'Neill (0–1), C. Carey (0–1), Seán O'Neill (0–1).		L. Cahill (1–3), M. Cleary (0–4), D. Ryan (0–2), T. Dunne (0–2), J. Leahy (0–2), K. Tucker (0–1). N. English (0–1), L. McGrath (0–1).

Gaelic Grounds, Limerick
Attendance: 43,525
Referee: J. O'Leary (Cork)

July 14
Final Replay

Limerick	4–7 – 0–16	Tipperary
O. O'Neill (2–0), F. Carroll (1–1), T. J. Ryan (1–1), D. Quigley (0–2), B. Foley (0–1). C. Carey (0–1), G. Kirby (0–1).		M. Cleary (0–7), D. Ryan (0–4), N. English (0–3), L. McGrath (0–1), L. Cahill (0–1).

Páirc Uí Chaoimh, Cork
Attendance: 40,000
Referee: J. O'Leary (Cork)

== All-Ireland Senior Hurling Championship ==
=== Bracket ===
Preliminary round 1
New York	1–16
London	0–14

Preliminary round 2
New York	4–16
Derry	0–13

Quarter-finals
Galway	4–22
New York	0–08

Semi-finals
Wexford	2–13
Galway	3–07
Limerick	1–17
Antrim	0–13

Final
Wexford	1–13
Limerick	0–14

=== All-Ireland preliminary round 1 ===
June 16
Preliminary round 1

New York	1–16 – 0–14	London

Gaelic Park, New York City

=== All-Ireland preliminary round 2 ===
July 7
Preliminary round 2

New York	4–16 – 0–13	Derry

Gaelic Park, New York City

=== All-Ireland quarter-finals ===
July 20
Quarter-Final

Galway	4–22 – 0–08	New York
K. Broderick (3–1), F. Forde (1–5), J. Rabbitte (0–4), C. Moore (0–4), M. Coleman (0–3), O. Fahy (0–2), B. Keogh (0–1), J. Cooney (0–1), O. Canning (0–1).		R. Hogan (0–3), J. Madden (0–2), O. Cummins (0–1), I. Conroy (0–1), B. McCabe (0–1).

Kenny Park, Athenry

=== All-Ireland semi-finals ===
August 4
Semi-Final

Limerick	1–17 – 0–13	Antrim
G. Kirby (0–9), F. Craroll (1–2), D. Quigley (0–2), T. J. Ryan (0–1), O. O'Neill (0–1), M. Houlihan (0–1), B. Foley (0–1).		J. Connolly (0–3), A. McCloskey (0–3), Gary O'Kane (0–2), S. P. McKillop (0–1), P. Graham (0–1), G. O'Kane (0–1), A. Elliot (0–1), Conor McCCambridge (0–1).

Croke Park, Dublin
Attendance: 61,937
Referee: P. Aherne (Carlow)

August 4
Semi-Final

Wexford	2–13 – 3–07	Galway
T. Dempsey (0–6), R. McCarthy (1–1), B. Byrne (1–0), M. Storey (0–3), L. Murphy (0–1), É. Scallan (0–1), J. O'Connor (0–1).		C. Moore (1–3), K. Broderick (1–0), J. Cooney (1–0), F. Forde (0–2), L. Burke (0–1), B. Keogh (0–1).

Croke Park, Dublin
Attendance: 61,937
Referee: J. O'Leary (Cork)

=== All-Ireland final ===
September 1
15:30 UTC+1

Wexford	1–13 – 0–14	Limerick
T. Dempsey (1–3), G. Laffan (0–3), L. O'Gorman (0–2), M. Storey (0–2), L. Murphy (0–1), É. Scallan (0–1), J. O'Connor (0–1).	Report	B. Foley (0–4), C. Carey (0–3), G. Kirby (0–2), O. O'Neill (0–1), D. Quigley (0–1), T. J. Ryan (0–1), F. Carroll (0–1), D. Clarke (0–1).

Croke Park, Dublin
Attendance: 65,847
Referee: P. Horan (Offaly)

Wexford	Limerick

== Championship statistics ==
=== Scoring ===
- First goal of the championship: Robert Galvin for Westmeath against Carlow (Leinster preliminary round 1)
- Last goal of the championship: Tom Dempsey for Wexford against Limerick (All-Ireland final)
- First hat-trick of the championship: Kevin Broderick for Galway against New York (All-Ireland quarter-final)
- Widest winning margin: 26 points
  - Galway 4–22 : 0–8 New York (All-Ireland quarter-final)
- Most goals in a match: 6
  - Offaly 4–17 : 2–10 Laois (Leinster semi-final)
  - Kerry 2–11 : 4–19 Tipperary (Munstersemi-final)
- Most points in a match: 38
  - Wexford 2–23 : 2–15 Offaly (Leinster final)

=== Top scorers ===
==== Season ====
Rank	Player	County	Tally	Total	Matches	Average
1	Gary Kirby	Limerick	1–35	38	6	6.33
2	Francis Forde	Galway	3–15	24	3	8.00
3	Tom Dempsey	Wexford	2–15	21	5	4.20
4	Johnny Dooley	Offaly	0–19	19	3	6.33
4	Liam Cahill	Tipperary	3–10	19	4	4.75
6	Michael Cleary	Tipperary	0–18	18	4	4.50
6	Kevin Broderick	Galway	5–3	18	3	6.00

==== Single game ====
Rank	Player	County	Tally	Total	Opposition
1	Francis Forde	Galway	2–8	14	Roscommon
2	Niall English	Carlow	1–9	12	Westmeath
3	Kevin Broderick	Galway	3–1	10	New York
3	Gary Kirby	Limerick	1–7	10	Tipperary
3	Gary Kirby	Limerick	0–10	10	Tipperary
6	Seán McLoughlin	Westmeath	1–6	9	Carlow
6	David Martin	Meath	1–6	9	Offaly
6	Gary Kirby	Limerick	0–9	9	Antrim
9	John Byrne	Carlow	2–2	8	Westmeath
9	John Troy	Offaly	2–2	8	Laois
9	John Leahy	Tipperary	2–2	8	Kerry
9	Tom Dempsey	Wexford	1–5	8	Offaly
9	Paul Flynn	Waterford	1–5	8	Tipperary
9	Francis Forde	Galway	1–5	8	New York

== Miscellaneous ==
- Cork's 3–18 to 1–8 defeat by Limerick in the Munster quarter-final was the team's biggest defeat since 1936. It was also Cork's first championship defeat at home since 1923.

=== Debutantes ===
The following players made their début in the 1996 championship:

Player	Team	Date	Opposition	Game
Derek Barrett	Cork	May 26	Limerick	Munster quarter-final
Joe Deane	Cork	May 26	Limerick	Munster quarter-final
Seán Óg Ó hAilpín	Cork	May 26	Limerick	Munster quarter-final
Ken McGrath	Waterford	June 2	Tipperary	Munster quarter-final
Kevin Flynn	Dublin	June 23	Wexford	Leinster semi-final
Ollie Canning	Galway	July 6	Roscommon	Connacht final

=== Retirees ===
The following players played their last game in the 1996 championship:

Player	Team	Date	Opposition	Game	Début
Jim Cashman	Cork	May 26	Limerick	Munster quarter-final	1986
Nicky English	Tipperary	July 14	Limerick	Munster final	1982

== Sources ==
- Corry, Eoghan, The GAA Book of Lists (Hodder Headline Ireland, 2005).
- Donegan, Des, The Complete Handbook of Gaelic Games (DBA Publications Limited, 2005).
- Sweeney, Éamonn, Munster Hurling Legends (The O'Brien Press, 2002).
