= Éamonn Scallan =

Irish hurler & manager (born 1972)

Personal information
- Native name: Éamonn Ó Scallain (Irish)
- Born: 1972 (age 53–54) Castletown, County Wexford, Ireland
- Occupation: Secondary school teacher

Sport
- Sport: Hurling
- Position: Left wing-forward
Clubs
- Years: Club
- Castletown Liam Mellows; Ferns St Aidan's
Club titles
- Wexford titles: 0
College
- Years: College
- University College Dublin
College titles
- Fitzgibbon titles: 1
Inter-county
- Years: County
- 1993–1999: Wexford
Inter-county titles
- Leinster titles: 2
- All-Irelands: 1
- NHL: 0
- All Stars: 0

Éamonn Scallan (born 1972) is an Irish hurling coach and former player. At club level, he played with Castletown Liam Mellows and Ferns St Aidan's and at inter-county level was a member of the Wexford senior hurling team. Scallan has also served as a manager at club and inter-county levels.

== Playing career ==
Scallan first played hurling to a high standard as a student at Gorey CBS. He lined out in all grades during his time there, and was part of the team beaten by Good Counsel College in the Leinster Colleges JBHC final in 1988. Scallan later won a Fitzgibbon Cup medal with University College Dublin in 1993.

At club level, Scallan first played for the Castletown Liam Mellows club as a dual player in the juvenile and underage grades before progressing to adult level. He later transferred to the Ferns St Aidan's club.

Scallan first appeared on the inter-county scene with Wexford with the minor team, before progressing to the under-21 team. He also earned a call-up to the junior team and won a Leinster JHC medal before beating Cork in the 1996 All-Ireland junior final. Scallan made his senior team debut in the National Hurling League in November 1992 and quickly became a regular member of the starting fifteen. He won a Leinster SHC medal in 1996, before playing at left corner-forward when Wexford played Limerick in the 1996 All-Ireland final. He was sent off during the game and received a three-month ban, however, he claimed a winners' medal following the 1-13 to 0-14 win.

A second Leinster SHC medal followed for Scallan in 1997, when Wexford retained the title after a defeat of Kilkenny. He brought his inter-county career to an end in 1999.

== Coaching career ==
Scallan first became involved in team management and coaching with Ferns St Aidan's. He managed the club's under-21 team to the Wexford U21HC title in 2007, the same year he guided the club's intermediates to the IHC title after a defeat of Rathnure in the final.

At inter-county level, Scallan became a selector as part of Colm Bonnar's Wexford senior hurling management team in November 2008. During his three-year tenure in this role, Wexford claimed the National League Division 2 title in 2010. Scallan later spent some time as coach of Wexford's under-16 development team before becoming Wexford's minor team manager in 2015.

Scallan has also served as manager of the Mount Leinster Rangers and Éire Óg Greystones club sides. He was appointed manager of the Wicklow senior hurling team in November 2018. Scallan's four seasons in charge saw Wicklow win the National League Division 2B title following a 1-09 to 0-08 defeat of Derry in 2019.

== Honours ==
=== Player ===
University College Dublin

- Fitzgibbon Cup: 1993

Wexford

- All-Ireland Senior Hurling Championship: 1996
- Leinster Senior Hurling Championship: 1996, 1997
- All-Ireland Junior Hurling Championship: 1992
- Leinster Junior Hurling Championship: 1992

=== Management ===
Ferns St Aidan's

- Wexford Intermediate Hurling Championship: 2007
- Wexford Under-21 A Hurling Championship: 2007

Wicklow

- National Hurling League Division2 B: 2010

Sporting positions
Preceded by Larry Coleman	Wexford minor hurling team manager 2015–2017	Succeeded by James Sheil
Preceded by Séamus Murphy	Wicklow senior hurling team manager 2018–2000	Succeeded by Casey O'Brien
