= 1996 All-Ireland Senior Hurling Championship final =

1996 All-Ireland Senior Hurling Final
- Event: 1996 All-Ireland Senior Hurling Championship
Wexford	Limerick
1-13	0-14
- Date: 1 September 1996
- Venue: Croke Park, Dublin
- Man of the Match: Liam Dunne
- Referee: P. Horan (Offaly)
- Attendance: 65,849
- Weather: Dry

The 1996 All-Ireland Senior Hurling Championship Final was the 109th All-Ireland Final and the culmination of the 1996 All-Ireland Senior Hurling Championship, an inter-county hurling tournament for the top teams in Ireland. The match was held at Croke Park, Dublin, on 1 September 1996, between Wexford and Limerick. Leinster champions Wexford defeated their Munster opponents on a scoreline of 1-13 to 0-14.

1 September
15:30 UTC+1

Wexford	1–13 – 0–14	Limerick
T. Dempsey (1–3), G. Laffan (0–3), L. O'Gorman (0–2), M. Storey (0–2), L. Murphy (0–1), É. Scallan (0–1), J. O'Connor (0–1).	Report	B. Foley (0–4), C. Carey (0–3), G. Kirby (0–2), O. O'Neill (0–1), D. Quigley (0–1), T. J. Ryan (0–1), F. Carroll (0–1), D. Clarke (0–1).

Croke Park, Dublin
Attendance: 65,847
Referee: P. Horan (Offaly)

Wexford	Limerick
