= Tom Dempsey (hurler) =

Irish hurler

Personal information
- Native name: Tomás Ó Díomsaigh (Irish)
- Born: 1965 (age 60–61) Kilmuckridge, County Wexford
- Occupation: Customer manager
- Height: 5 ft 10 in (178 cm)

Sport
- Sport: Hurling
- Position: Right corner-forward
Club
- Years: Club
- Buffer's Alley
Club titles
- Wexford titles: 8
- Leinster titles: 3
- All-Ireland Titles: 1
Inter-county
- Years: County
- 1984-2000: Wexford
Inter-county titles
- Leinster titles: 2
- All-Irelands: 1
- NHL: 0
- All Stars: 1

Thomas Dempsey (born 1965) is a retired Irish sportsperson. He played hurling with his local club Buffer's Alley and with the Wexford senior inter-county team from 1984 until 2000.

== Playing career ==
=== Club ===
Dempsey played his club hurling with the famous Buffer's Alley GAA club and enjoyed much success. He first came to prominence on the club's senior team in the early 1980s as the team was in the middle of completing a four in-a-row of county championship titles between 1982 and 1985. This last county title was later converted into a Leinster club title for Dempsey, but his side was beaten by Kilruane MacDonagh's of Tipperary in the All-Ireland final. 1988 saw Dempsey won another county title before later adding a second Leinster club medal to his collection. Once again Buffer's Alley reached the All-Ireland final, this time with O’Donovan Rossa of Antrim providing the opposition. Victory went to the Wexford men by 2–12 to 0–12, giving Dempsey an All-Ireland club medal. He won another set of county medals in 1989 and 1991 before collecting a third Leinster club medal in the latter year. His side was later defeated by Sarsfield's of Galway in the All-Ireland final. Dempsey finished off his career by winning a final county title in 1993.

=== Inter-county ===
Dempsey first came to prominence as a dual player at minor level. He played both hurling and Gaelic football for Wexford in the under-18 grade, but he enjoyed little success. Dempsey later joined the county under-21 hurling team. Here he won a Leinster title in 1986 following victory in a replay over Offaly. The subsequent All-Ireland final saw Galway provide the opposition. Dempsey's side were completely outclassed on that occasion as Galway won by 1–14 to 2–5.

By this stage Dempsey had already made his debut with the Wexford senior team, but it was not a happy time to be a Wexford hurler. The county had been pushed back into third place in the Leinster Championship behind Kilkenny and Offaly. Provincial final appearances in 1988 and 1992 brought nothing but defeat for Dempsey's team. In 1993 Dempsey was captain as Wexford looked set for glory when they reached the final of the National Hurling League. The opponents on that occasion were Cork; the game ended in a draw. The replay saw extra time being played, but both sides ended level once again. At the third attempt Cork emerged victorious by 3–11 to 1–12. In spite of this defeat expectations were still high for the Leinster championship. In the final of that competition Wexford drew with arch rivals and All-Ireland champions Kilkenny and there was hope of success. The replay was a different affair as Kilkenny won handily enough by 2–12 to 0–11.

Wexford were defeated in the Leinster final again in 1994 before disappearing from the championship at the first hurdle in 1995. By 1996 things were beginning to change in Wexford, thanks in no small way to the new manager Liam Griffin. Once again Dempsey lined out in the Leinster final. Offaly provided the opposition on that occasion; history was made as Wexford won by 2–23 to 2–15. It was Demspey's first senior Leinster title and Wexford's first since 1977. Wexford later defeated Galway in the penultimate game of the championship, setting up an All-Ireland final meeting with Limerick. The Munster men were slight favourites going into the game. They were the beaten finalists of 1994 and had already beaten Clare, the reigning champions, in the Munster Championship. The game was far from a classic, though it did provide excitement. Dempsey was the hero of the day as he scored a goal after nineteen minutes to give Wexford a major advantage. His side led by 1–8 to 0–10 at half-time in spite of having Éamonn Scallon sent off. Wexford took a four-point lead in the second-half; this was whittled back to two points as Wexford hung on for the last twenty minutes. The final score of 1–13 to 0-14 showed how vital Dempsey's goal was. It was his first All-Ireland medal and Wexford's first since 1968. Dempsey was later honoured with an All-Star award.

Dempsey captured a second Leinster medal in 1997 as Kilkenny fell in the provincial decider. 1997 saw the introduction of the so-called ‘back-door’ system whereby the defeated Munster and Leinster finalists were allowed back into the All-Ireland championship at the quarter-final stage. Because of this Wexford's opponents in the All-Ireland semi-final were Tipperary, the Munster runners-up. On that occasion Wexford were outclassed by Tipp who won by 2–16 to 0–15. The next few years saw Wexford defeated in the early stages of the provincial championship. Dempsey retired from inter-county hurling in 2000.

=== Provincial ===
Dempsey also lined out with Leinster in the inter-provincial hurling competition. He won his sole Railway Cup medal in 1993 as Leinster defeated Ulster.

Sporting positions
Preceded by Éamonn Sinnot	Wexford Senior Hurling Captain; 1993	Succeeded by Larry Murphy
