= List of Munster Senior Hurling Championship medal winners =

This is a list of hurlers who have received a winners' medal in the Munster Senior Hurling Championship.

Currently, the Munster Council of the Gaelic Athletic Association issues medals limited to the winning team, however, the individual county board has the option of ordering extra medals for members of the extended panel or for players, who may have played during the championship but missed the final due to injury.

== Players ==
=== 2006-present ===
Player	No.	Team(s)	Championships	Notes
Darren Gleeson	3	Tipperary	2011, 2015, 2016	
Cathal Barrett	2	Tipperary	2015, 2016	
James Barry	2	Tipperary	2015, 2016	
Michael Cahill	3	Tipperary	2011, 2012, 2016	
Séamus Kennedy	1	Tipperary	2016	
Ronan Maher	2	Tipperary	2015, 2016	
Pádraic Maher	5	Tipperary	2009, 2011, 2012, 2015, 2016	
Brendan Maher	5	Tipperary	2009, 2011, 2012, 2015, 2016	
Michael Breen	2	Tipperary	2015, 2016	
Dan McCormack	1	Tipperary	2016	
Patrick Maher	4	Tipperary	2011, 2012, 2015, 2016	
Noel McGrath	4	Tipperary	2009, 2011, 2012, 2016	
John McGrath	1	Tipperary	2016	
Séamus Callanan	6	Tipperary	2008, 2009, 2011, 2012, 2015, 2016	
Niall O'Meara	2	Tipperary	2015, 2016	
Jason Forde	2	Tipperary	2015, 2016	
Seán Curran	1	Tipperary	2016	
Kieran Bergin	2	Tipperary	2015, 2016	
Aidan McCormack	1	Tipperary	2016	
Donagh Maher	2	Tipperary	2012, 2016	
James Woodlock	3	Tipperary	2008, 2009, 2015	
Shane McGrath	5	Tipperary	2008, 2009, 2011, 2012, 2015	
John O'Dwyer	1	Tipperary	2015	
Lar Corbett	6	Tipperary	2001, 2008, 2009, 2011, 2012, 2015	
Séamus Bourke	1	Tipperary	2015	
Conor O'Brien	4	Tipperary	2008, 2009, 2012, 2015	
Anthony Nash	1	Cork	2014	
Christopher Joyce	1	Cork	2014	
Shane O'Neill	1	Cork	2014	
Stephen McDonnell	1	Cork	2014	
Lorcán McLoughlin	1	Cork	2014	
Mark Ellis	1	Cork	2014	
Damien Cahalane	1	Cork	2014	
Daniel Kearney	1	Cork	2014	
Aidan Walsh	1	Cork	2014	
Séamus Harnedy	1	Cork	2014	
Bill Cooper	1	Cork	2014	
Conor Lehane	1	Cork	2014	
Alan Cadogan	1	Cork	2014	
Pa Cronin	1	Cork	2014	
Paudie O'Sullivan	1	Cork	2014	
William Egan	1	Cork	2014	
Stephen Moylan	1	Cork	2014	
Nickie Quaid	1	Limerick	2013	
Stephen Walsh	1	Limerick	2013	
Richie McCarthy	1	Limerick	2013	
Tom Condon	1	Limerick	2013	
Paudie O'Brien	1	Limerick	2013	
Wayne McNamara	1	Limerick	2013	
Gavin O'Mahony	1	Limerick	2013	
Paul Browne	1	Limerick	2013	
Donal O'Grady	1	Limerick	2013	
David Breen	1	Limerick	2013	
James Ryan	1	Limerick	2013	
Séamus Hickey	1	Limerick	2013	
Graeme Mulcahy	1	Limerick	2013	
Declan Hannon	1	Limerick	2013	
Seán Tobin	1	Limerick	2013	
Shane Dowling	1	Limerick	2013	
Conor Allis	1	Limerick	2013	
Cathal King	1	Limerick	2013	
Kevin Downes	1	Limerick	2013	
Niall Moran	1	Limerick	2013	
Brendan Cummins	5	Tipperary	2001, 2008, 2009, 2011, 2012	
Paul Curran	4	Tipperary	2008, 2009, 2011, 2012	
Thomas Stapleton	1	Tipperary	2012	
Conor O'Mahony	4	Tipperary	2008, 2009, 2011, 2012	
Brian O'Meara	1	Tipperary	2012	
Pa Bourke	2	Tipperary	2011, 2012	
John O'Brien	5	Tipperary	2001, 2008, 2009, 2011, 2012	
Eoin Kelly	5	Tipperary	2001, 2008, 2009, 2011, 2012	
Shane Bourke	2	Tipperary	2011, 2012	
Paddy Stapleton	2	Tipperary	2009, 2011	
John O'Keeffe	1	Tipperary	2011	
Gearóid Ryan	1	Tipperary	2011	
Benny Dunne	3	Tipperary	2008, 2009, 2011	
Clinton Hennessy	2	Waterford	2007, 2010	
Eoin Murphy	4	Waterford	2002, 2004, 2007, 2010	
Liam Lawlor	1	Waterford	2010	
Noel Connors	1	Waterford	2010	
Tony Browne	4	Waterford	2002, 2004, 2007, 2010	
Michael Walsh	3	Waterford	2004, 2007, 2010	
Declan Prendergast	3	Waterford	2004, 2007, 2010	
Shane O'Sullivan	2	Waterford	2004, 2010	
Richie Foley	1	Waterford	2010	
Stephen Molumphy	2	Waterford	2007, 2010	
Kevin Moran	2	Waterford	2007, 2010	
Eoin Kelly	4	Waterford	2002, 2004, 2007, 2010	
Séamus Prendergast	4	Waterford	2002, 2004, 2007, 2010	
John Mullane	4	Waterford	2002, 2004, 2007, 2010	
Shane Walsh	1	Waterford	2010	
Brian O'Halloran	1	Waterford	2010	
Maurice Shanahan	1	Waterford	2010	
Jamie Nagle	1	Waterford	2010	
Dan Shanahan	4	Waterford	2002, 2004, 2007, 2010	
Eoin McGrath	4	Waterford	2002, 2004, 2007, 2010	
Ken McGrath	4	Waterford	2002, 2004, 2007, 2010	
Shane Casey	1	Waterford	2010	
Declan Fanning	2	Tipperary	2008, 2009	
Pat Kerwick	2	Tipperary	2008, 2009	
Willie Ryan	1	Tipperary	2009	
Hugh Maloney	2	Tipperary	2008, 2009	
Micheál Webster	2	Tipperary	2008, 2009	
Éamonn Buckley	1	Tipperary	2008	
Éamonn Corcoran	2	Tipperary	2001, 2008	
Shane Maher	1	Tipperary	2008	
Séamus Butler	1	Tipperary	2008	
Aidan Kearney	1	Waterford	2007	
Jack Kennedy	2	Waterford	2004, 2007	
Paul Flynn	3	Waterford	2002, 2004, 2007	
James Murray	3	Waterford	2002, 2004, 2007	
Donal Óg Cusack	5	Cork	1999, 2000, 2003, 2005, 2006	
Pat Mulcahy	3	Cork	2003, 2005, 2006	
Diarmuid O'Sullivan	5	Cork	1999, 2000, 2003, 2005, 2006	
Brian Murphy	2	Cork	2005, 2006	
John Gardiner	3	Cork	2003, 2005, 2006	
Ronan Curran	3	Cork	2003, 2005, 2006	
Seán Óg Ó hAilpín	5	Cork	1999, 2000, 2003, 2005, 2006	
Tom Kenny	3	Cork	2003, 2005, 2006	
Jerry O'Connor	3	Cork	2003, 2005, 2006	
Ben O'Connor	5	Cork	1999, 2000, 2003, 2005, 2006	
Niall McCarthy	3	Cork	2003, 2005, 2006	
Timmy McCarthy	5	Cork	1999, 2000, 2003, 2005, 2006	
Kieran Murphy	5	Cork	1999, 2000, 2003, 2005, 2006	
Cian O'Connor	1	Cork	2006	
Brian Corcoran	5	Cork	1992, 1999, 2000, 2005, 2006	
Joe Deane	5	Cork	1999, 2000, 2003, 2005, 2006	
Neil Ronan	3	Cork	1999, 2005, 2006	
