= 2013 Munster Senior Hurling Championship final =

- Event: 2013 Munster Senior Hurling Championship
Cork	Limerick
0-15	0-24
- Date: 14 July 2013
- Venue: Gaelic Grounds, Limerick
- Man of the Match: James Ryan
- Referee: James McGrath (Westmeath)
- Attendance: 42,370
- Weather: Sunshine (28°C)

The 2013 Munster Senior Hurling Championship final was the 122nd final of the Munster Senior Hurling Championship, the most prestigious provincial hurling championship. The match, contested by Limerick and Cork, took place on 14 July 2013 at the Gaelic Grounds in Limerick, and started at 4:00 p.m. It was Limerick's 45th Munster final and Cork's 80th. In Ireland, the match was televised live on The Sunday Game on RTÉ Two, with commentary from Ger Canning and Michael Duignan.

The championship winners were awarded a place in the semi-finals of the 2013 All-Ireland Senior Hurling Championship, while the loser went through to the quarter-finals.

== Route to the final ==
=== Limerick ===
Entering the Munster Championship at the semi-final stage by virtue of a bye, Limerick's first game was at home against Tipperary on 9 June 2013. Limerick were very much the underdogs going into the game as, it was believed, the burden of playing in Division 1B of the National Hurling League would ultimately prove their undoing, while Tipperary would exploit time and space to exert unbearable pressure and ultimately restate their credentials as Kilkenny's most likely challengers for the All-Ireland. All did not go to plan for the Premier County, who were 0-03 to 0-01 behind early on and were five down when Seán Tobin scored the opening goal for Limerick after Brendan Cummins had scooped the ball clear in a goalmouth scramble. Limerick led by 1-07 to 0-07 at half-time. John O'Dwyer came off the bench to make his championship debut and scored 1-03 in the second half for Tipp. He fired home a brilliant 49th-minute goal and Tipp led by 1-13 to 1-09. Limerick fought back to draw level at 1-14 apiece and set up a grandstand finish. They edged two points clear with points from subs Shane Dowling and Niall Moran, before Eoin Kelly dragged Tipp back into contention with five minutes left. But Limerick were flying and they bagged the final two scores through captain Donal O'Grady and Declan Hannon to secure a 1-18 to 1-15 victory, their first over Tipperary since 2007.

=== Cork ===
Also entering the Munster Championship at the semi-final stage by virtue of a bye, Cork's first game was at the Gaelic Grounds against Clare, quarter-final winners over Waterford, on 23 June 2013. Clare were slight favourites as they had won a Waterford Crystal Cup clash early in the year – before winning the two National League fixtures between the teams, including a relegation play-off. Cork started without injured duo Paudie O'Sullivan and Lorcán McLoughlin, while team captain Pa Cronin also started on the bench. Clare played with a strong wind in the opening period and led by 0-11 to 0-08 at half-time. Cork scored the final point of the first half via goalkeeper Anthony Nash's long-range free, before they opened the second half in devastating fashion. Eight points on the bounce ensured that Cork's three-point deficit had become a five-point lead. Cork won the second half by 0-15 to 0-04 to score their first victory over Clare in 2013 – at the fourth attempt.

== Pre-match ==
Cork were appearing in the Munster final for the 80th time since the championship was founded in 1888. The team had won the Munster final fifty times (most recently in 2006) and were runners-up twenty-nine times (most recently in 2010). Limerick were appearing in the provincial showpiece for the 45th time. The team had won the championship eighteen times (most recently in 1996) and were runners-up twenty-six times (most recently in 2007).

Ticket prices for the final started at €20 for the Clare End and City End terraces, and were available at €30 for uncovered stand and €35 for the covered Mackey Stand.

== Match ==
=== Summary ===
Limerick beat fourteen-man Cork by 0-24 to 0-15 to secure the Munster crown for the first time since 1996. The Munster final failed to produce a goal for the first time since 1978. Cork's Patrick Horgan was sent-off in first half injury time for striking Limerick wing-back Paudie O'Brien on the helmet under a high ball.

Limerick took advantage and went on to compile a comfortable victory. The final whistle was greeted by scenes of euphoria at the Limerick city venue, as a seventeen-year wait for Munster glory came to an end. The Munster Cup was lifted by captain Donal O'Grady.

=== Details ===
14 July 2013
16:00 IST

Cork	0-15 - 0-24	Limerick
P Horgan (0-4, 2 frees), S Harnedy, P Cronin (0-3 each), J Coughlan (0-2 frees), L O'Farrell, D Kearney, C Naughton (0-1 each)	Report	D Hannon (0-8, 5 frees, 1 sideline), J Ryan, S Dowling (0-3 each), G Mulcahy, S Tobin, K Downes (0-2 each), P O’Brien, P Browne, S Hickey, N Moran (0-1 each)

Gaelic Grounds
Attendance: 42,730
Referee: James McGrath (Westmeath)

Cork	Limerick

CORK:
1	Anthony Nash
2	Shane O'Neill
3	Stephen McDonnell
4	Conor O'Sullivan
5	Tom Kenny
6	Christopher Joyce
7	William Egan
8	Lorcán McLoughlin
9	Daniel Kearney
10	Séamus Harnedy
11	Cian McCarthy
12	Pa Cronin (c)
13	Luke O'Farrell
14	Patrick Horgan
15	Conor Lehane
Substitutes:
16	Darren McCarthy
17	Killian Murphy
18	Pa O'Mahony
19	Colm Spillane
20	Mark Ellis
21	Stephen White
22	Rob O'Shea
23	Cathal Naughton
24	Jamie Coughlan
25	Stephen Moylan
26	Michael Cussen
Manager:
Jimmy Barry-Murphy

LIMERICK:
1	Nicky Quaid
2	Stephen Walsh
3	Richie McCarthy
4	Tom Condon
5	Paudie O'Brien
6	Wayne McNamara
7	Gavin O'Mahony
8	Paul Browne
9	Donal O'Grady (c)
10	David Breen
11	James Ryan
12	Séamus Hickey
13	Graeme Mulcahy
14	Declan Hannon
15	Seán Tobin
Substitutes:
16	Aaron Murphy
17	Mark Carmody
18	Cathal King
19	Alan Dempsey
20	Shane Dowling
21	Conor Allis
22	Niall Moran
23	Kevin Downes
24	Paudie Aherne
25	Tommy Quaid Jnr
26	Thomas Ryan
Manager:
John Allen

Man of the match

- James Ryan (Limerick)

Match officials

- Umpires:
  - David Clune (Westmeath)
  - Tom McNicholas (Westmeath)
  - David Hennessy (Westmeath)
  - Johnny Fitzpatrick (Westmeath)
- Standby: Barry Kelly (Westmeath)
- Linesman: Brian Gavin (Offaly)
- Fourth official: Pat Casey (Waterford)

Match rules

- 70 minutes.
- Replay if sides level.
- Eleven named substitutes.
- Maximum of five substitutions.

== Reaction ==
Limerick manager John Allen believed the element of surprise and a well drilled and disciplined panel of players were the deciding factors in their victory over Cork. Allen, who was in his second year as manager, said he had absolute faith that his players would deliver victory on the big day. Cork manager Jimmy Barry-Murphy criticised the decision to send off Patrick Horgan in the first half, saying "It was an unbelievable decision that is all I can say, anyone that was at the match can judge for themselves." Speaking on The Sunday Game programme later that night, former Cork goalkeeper Donal Óg Cusack agreed that the sending off was harsh, saying "I think it was extremely harsh - I don't think the intention was there, I know technically the referee can say he made the right decision but referees are encouraged to use their common sense."

Declan Hannon, Richie McCarthy and James Ryan were shortlisted by The Sunday Game panel for the Man of the Match award before confirming James Ryan as the winner.
