= 2014 Munster Senior Hurling Championship final =

- Event: 2014 Munster Senior Hurling Championship
| Cork | Limerick |
| 2-24 | 0-24 |
- Date: 13 July 2014
- Venue: Páirc Uí Chaoimh, Cork
- Man of the Match: Séamus Harnedy
- Referee: Brian Gavin (Offaly)
- Attendance: 36,075
- Weather: Sunshine (20°C)

The 2014 Munster Senior Hurling Championship final was the 123rd final of the Munster Senior Hurling Championship, the most prestigious provincial hurling championship. The match, contested by defending champions Limerick and Cork, took place on 13 July 2014 at Páirc Uí Chaoimh in Cork, and started at 4:00 p.m. The final also marked the last major GAA match at Páirc Uí Chaoimh before a €70 million redevelopment.

The championship winners were awarded a place in the semi-finals of the 2014 All-Ireland Senior Hurling Championship on 17 August, while the loser went through to the quarter-finals on 27 July.

Cork won their first Munster title since 2006 after a 2-24 to 0-24 win.

== Route to the final ==
=== Cork ===
| 25 May 2014 Quarter-final | Waterford | 1-21 - 1-21 | Cork | Semple Stadium |
| 14:00 | P Mahony (0-11, 0-09 f), A Gleeson (1-02), B O’Sullivan (0-02), B Coughlan (0-01), J Nagle (0-01), T de Búrca (0-01), J Dillon (0-01), S Walsh (0-01), E Barrett (0-01). | Report | P Horgan (0-12, 0-08 frees 0-01 ’65), B Cooper (1-01), A Cadogan (0-04), A Walsh (0-02), C Lehane (0-01), S Harnedy (0-01). | Attendance: 16,025; Referee: B Gavin (Offaly) |

| 8 June 2014 Quarter-final replay | Waterford | 0-14 - 0-28 | Cork | Semple Stadium |
| 15:30 | P Mahony (0-05, 3f, 1 65), A Gleeson (0-03), C Dunford (0-02), S O'Sullivan (0-01), B O’Sullivan (0-01), S Walsh (0-01), R Foley (0-01). | Report | P Horgan (0-10, 5f), C Lehane (0-04), S Harnedy (0-03), B Cooper (0-03), D Kearney (0-02), P O’Sullivan (0-02), C Joyce (0-01), A Cadogan (0-01), S Moylan (0-01), R O'Shea (0-01). | Attendance: 22,093; Referee: J Ryan (Tipperary) |

| 15 June 2014 Semi-final | Clare | 2-18 - 2-23 | Cork | Semple Stadium |
| 16:00 | Colin Ryan 0-6 (5f, 1 65), J Conlon 1-2, D Honan 1-0, C McGrath, C Galvin, N O’Connell (0-2 each), T Kelly, P Collins, P Donnellan, C McInerney 0-1 each. | Report | P Horgan 2-11 (1-11f, 1-0 pen), A Cadogan, D Kearney 0-3 each, C Lehane 0-2, D Cahalane, A Walsh, W Egan, P O’Sullivan 0-1 each. | Attendance: 28,660; Referee: J McGrath (Westmeath) |

=== Limerick ===
| 1 June 2014 Semi-final | Tipperary | 2-16 - 2-18 | Limerick | Semple Stadium |
| 16:15 | G Ryan (1-02), J O’Dwyer, (0-05, 1f) S Callanan (0-05, 3f), Patrick Maher (1-00), N McGrath (0-01), N O'Meara (0-01), L Corbett (0-01), D Maher (0-01). | Report | S Dowling (2-09, 1-09f), D O’Grady (0-02), K Downes (0-02), P Browne (0-01), D Hannon (0-01), G Mulcahy (0-01), S Hickey (0-01), T Ryan (0-01). | Attendance: 24,912; Referee: B Kelly (Westmeath) |

== Build-up ==
Tickets for the game were initially only available for purchase from clubs, with no public sale. The capacity of Páirc Uí Chaoimh for the match was announced at 32,168. Covered stand tickets were priced at €35, with uncovered stand tickets at €30 and terrace tickets at €20. The match was shown live on RTÉ Two as part of The Sunday Game Live, presented by Michael Lyster, with match commentary from Ger Canning and Michael Duignan and studio analysis from Cyril Farrell, Ger Loughnane and Liam Sheedy.

On 10 July, following the completion of works at the grounds, the capacity for the final was increased to 36,646, with extra tickets being made available. 1,500 terrace tickets for the Blackrock and City Ends were made available for purchase via tickets.ie and selected Centra and SuperValu stores on 10 July, however technical issues concerning tickets.ie, prevented supporters from purchasing tickets both in person and online.

Cork last won the Munster championship in 2006, the longest gap since the 10-year period between their 1956 and 1966 wins. Limerick's last title was in 2013, when they defeated Cork by 0-24 to 0-15. This was the 23rd meeting between Cork and Limerick in a Munster Final, with Cork having won 14 and Limerick winning 6, with 2 drawn finals in 1940 and 1944. Cork's last Munster final win against Limerick was in 1992 when they won by 1-22 to 3-11 at Semple Stadium. Cork aimed to win their 52nd Munster title, with Limerick going for their 20th title. Brian Gavin refereed his third Munster senior hurling final, he previously took charge of the 2010 replay and the 2011 final.

== Team selection ==
Limerick made one change to their team for the final, with David Breen coming in to replace Seán Tobin at corner forward. Limerick were managed by T. J. Ryan in his first year in charge, and captained by Donal O'Grady.

The Cork team was unchanged from the semi-final win against Clare. Cork were managed by Jimmy Barry-Murphy in his third year in charge in his second spell as manager, and captained by Pa Cronin.

== Match ==
=== Summary ===
Limerick made the better start and were 0-8 to 0-4 ahead by the 21st minute. Cork came back to level at 0-8 apiece and then went 0-12 to 0-9 in front approaching half time. The sides were level at 0-12 to 0-12 at halftime. The sides were level at 0-18 apiece midway through the second-half when Séamus Harnedy ran in on goals to score the opening goal in the 55th minute. Paudie O’Sullivan got the second goal of the game with five minutes remaining when he caught a ball from Daniel Kearney before finishing low to the net. Cork eventually ran out winners by six points.

=== Details ===
13 July 2014
16:00 IST

| Cork | 2-24 - 0-24 | Limerick |
|---|---|---|
| P Horgan (0-08, 0-06f), S Harnedy (1-02), C Lehane (0-05), P O'Sullivan (1-01), A Cadogan (0-03), A Walsh, B Cooper (0-02 each), A Nash (0-01, 0-01f) | report | S Dowling (0-12, 0-09f), G Mulcahy (0-03), D O'Grady (0-02), P O'Brien, W McNamara, J Ryan, P Browne, D Hannon, K Downes, D Breen (0-01 each) |

Páirc Uí Chaoimh
Attendance: 36,075
Referee: Brian Gavin (Offaly)

| Cork | Limerick |

CORK:
| 1 | Anthony Nash |
| 2 | Shane O'Neill |
| 3 | Damien Cahalane |
| 4 | Stephen McDonnell |
| 5 | Christopher Joyce |
| 6 | Mark Ellis |
| 7 | Lorcán McLoughlin |
| 8 | Daniel Kearney |
| 9 | Aidan Walsh |
| 10 | Conor Lehane |
| 11 | Bill Cooper |
| 12 | Séamus Harnedy |
| 13 | Alan Cadogan |
| 14 | Pa Cronin (c) |
| 15 | Patrick Horgan |
Substitutes: 26. Paudie O’Sullivan for Cronin (half-time); 19. William Egan for Cahalane (43); 23. Stephen Moylan for Cadogan (69)
Manager:
Jimmy Barry-Murphy

LIMERICK:
| 1 | Nicky Quaid |
| 2 | Tom Condon |
| 3 | Richie McCarthy |
| 4 | Séamus Hickey |
| 5 | Paudie O'Brien |
| 6 | Wayne McNamara |
| 7 | Gavin O'Mahony |
| 8 | James Ryan |
| 9 | Paul Browne |
| 10 | Declan Hannon |
| 11 | Donal O'Grady (c) |
| 12 | Shane Dowling |
| 13 | Graeme Mulcahy |
| 14 | Kevin Downes |
| 15 | David Breen |
Substitutes: 17. Stephen Walsh for O’Brien (52); 19. Sean Tobin for Hannon (55); 18. Cathal King for O’Mahony (65); 22. Thomas Ryan for Downes (68)
Manager:
T.J. Ryan

Man of the match

- Séamus Harnedy (Cork)

Match rules

- 70 minutes.
- Replay if sides level.
- Eleven named substitutes.
- Maximum of five substitutions.

== Reaction ==
Séamus Harnedy of Cork, who scored the opening goal in the game, was named as the man of the match on The Sunday Game, which was picked by Donal Óg Cusack and Eddie Brennan. Cork manager Jimmy Barry-Murphy felt that the victory was just reward for the efforts his Cork side had put in over the previous few seasons, saying "I'm very proud of the players and just thrilled for them and their families, they have made a massive effort over the last couple of years. We knew ourselves we had won nothing; we lost two finals last year and that was tough, It's a great reward for the players and the efforts they've made." Limerick manager TJ Ryan felt two big turnovers in the second half went a long way to deciding the game, saying "We are very disappointed, Munster finals are there for winning. We would love to have won it but it wasn't to be," said Ryan with a shake of his head, I think Cork just edged it in the finish and got some good scores and the first goal was always going to be crucial. We had some half chances in the first half and they got the chance in the second half and took it".
