= List of All-Ireland Senior Hurling Championship quarter-finals =

The All-Ireland Senior Hurling Championship quarter-finals are played to determine which teams will contest the All-Ireland Senior Hurling Championship semi-finals. They are the third last phase of the All-Ireland Senior Hurling Championship, a hurling competition contested by the top inter-county teams in Ireland. The quarter-finals are usually contested at Semple Stadium, Thurles, however, some quarter-finals have been played at alternative venues.

== List of quarter-finals by decade ==
=== Quarter-final key ===
Match ended in a draw
Match was a replay
Match was a refixture
All-Ireland champions
All-Ireland runners-up

== 1900s to 1940s ==
=== 1900s ===
Year	Semi-Final	Winner	Loser	Score	Venue
1905	1	Kilkenny	Lancashire	2-21 : 0-05	Jones's Road
1905	2	Antrim	Glasgow	3-13 : 3-11	Belfast
1906	1	Kilkenny	Donegal	7-21 : 1-03	Belfast

=== 1910s ===
Year	Semi-Final	Winner	Loser	Score	Venue
1910	1	Glasgow	Antrim	1-13 : 0-07	Belfast
1910	2	Kilkenny	London	5-11 : 0-03	Waterford
1913	1	Kilkenny	Glasgow	10-06 : 5-02	Glasgow

=== 1940s ===
Year	Semi-Final	Winner	Loser	Score	Venue
1943	1	Antrim	Galway	7-00 : 6-02	Corrigan Park

== 1970s ==
=== 1970s ===
Year	Semi-Final	Winner	Loser	Score	Venue
1971	1	Galway	Antrim	7-24 : 1-08	MacHale Park
1972	1	Galway	Antrim	7-16 : 4-07	Ballycastle GAA
1973	1	London	Galway	4-07 : 3-05	Dunlo GAA Grounds
1974	1	Galway	London	3-13 : 0-06	Páirc Chiaráin
1975	1	Galway	Westmeath	6-14 : 1-08	Athlone
1976	1	Galway	Kerry	3-12 : 3-09	Gaelic Grounds, Limerick
1977	1	Galway	Laois	2-12 : 0-08	St Brendan's Park, Birr
1978	1	Galway	Antrim	4-19 : 3-10	Croke Park
1979	1	Galway	Laois	1-23 : 3-10	St Brendan's Park, Birr

== 1980s ==
=== 1980s ===
Year	Semi-Final	Winner	Loser	Score	Venue
1980	1	Galway	Kildare	5-15 : 1-11	Croke Park
1981	1	Galway	Antrim	6-23 : 3-11	Croke Park
1982	1	Galway	Antrim	6-19 : 3-12	Croke Park
1983	1	Galway	Antrim	3-22 : 2-05	Cusack Park, Mullingar
1984	1	Galway	Westmeath	2-17 : 2-08	St Brendan's Park, Birr
1985	1	Antrim	London	3-12 : 1-15	Casement Park, Belfast
1986	1	Galway	Kerry	4-22 : 0-08	Cusack Park, Ennis
1987	1	Antrim	London	3-14 : 1-15	Casement Park, Belfast
1988	1	Galway	London	4-30 : 2-08	Kenny Park, Athenry
1989	1	Antrim	Kildare	4-14 : 0-07	St.Brigid's Park, Dundalk

== 1990s ==
=== 1990s ===
Year	Semi-Final	Winner	Loser	Score	Venue
1990	1	Galway	London	1-23 : 2-11	Duggan Park, Ballinasloe
1991	1	Antrim	Westmeath	5-11 : 1-05	St.Brigid's Park, Dundalk
1992	1	Galway	Carlow	4-19 : 3-09	Dr Cullen Park, Carlow
1993	1	Antrim	Meath	3-27 : 4-10	Castleblayney
1994	1	Galway	Roscommon	2-21 : 2-06	Athleague
1995	1	Down	London	0-16 : 0-09	Emeralds GAA Grounds, Ruislip
1996	1	Galway	New York	4-22 : 0-08	Kenny Park, Athenry
1997	1	Tipperary	Down	3-24 : 3-08	St Tiernach's Park, Clones
1997	2	Kilkenny	Galway	4-15 : 3-16	Semple Stadium
1998	1	Offaly	Antrim	2-18 : 2-09	Croke Park
1998	2	Waterford	Galway	1-20 : 1-10	Croke Park
1999	1	Offaly	Antrim	4-22 : 0-12	Croke Park
1999	2	Clare	Galway	3-18 : 2-14	Croke Park

== 2000s ==
=== 2000s ===
Year	Semi-Final	Winner	Loser	Score	Venue
2000	1	Offaly	Derry	2-23 : 2-17	Croke Park
2000	2	Galway	Tipperary	1-14 : 0-15	Croke Park
2001	1	Galway	Derry	4-23 : 1-11	Croke Park
2001	2	Wexford	Limerick	4-10 : 2-15	Croke Park
2002	1	Tipperary	Antrim	1-25 : 2-12	Croke Park
2002	2	Clare	Galway	1-15 : 0-17	Croke Park
2003	1	Tipperary	Offaly	2-16 : 2-11	Croke Park
2003	2	Wexford	Antrim	2-15 : 2-12	Croke Park
2004	1	Cork	Antrim	2-26 : 0-10	Croke Park
2004	2	Kilkenny	Clare	1-11 : 0-09	Semple Stadium
2005	1	Clare	Wexford	1-20 : 0-12	Croke Park
2005	2	Cork	Waterford	1-18 : 1-13	Croke Park
2005	3	Kilkenny	Limerick	0-18 : 0-13	Croke Park
2005	4	Galway	Tipperary	2-20 : 2-18	Croke Park
2006	1	Cork	Limerick	0-19 : 0-18	Semple Stadium
2006	2	Kilkenny	Galway	2-22 : 3-14	Semple Stadium
2006	3	Clare	Wexford	1-27 : 1-15	Croke Park
2006	4	Waterford	Tipperary	1-22 : 3-13	Croke Park
2007	1	Wexford	Tipperary	3-10 : 1-14	Croke Park
2007	2	Kilkenny	Galway	3-22 : 1-18	Croke Park
2007	3	Limerick	Clare	1-23 : 1-16	Croke Park
2007	4	Waterford	Cork	2-17 : 0-20	Croke Park
2008	1	Waterford	Wexford	2-19 : 3-15	Semple Stadium
2008	2	Cork	Clare	2-19 : 2-17	Semple Stadium
2009	1	Waterford	Galway	1-16 : 0-18	Semple Stadium
2009	2	Limerick	Dublin	2-18 : 1-17	Semple Stadium

== 2010s ==
=== 2010s ===
Year	Semi-Final	Winner	Loser	Score	Venue
2010	1	Cork	Antrim	1-25 : 0-19	Croke Park
2010	2	Tipperary	Galway	3-17 : 3-16	Croke Park
2011	1	Dublin	Limerick	3-13 : 0-18	Semple Stadium
2011	2	Waterford	Galway	2-23 : 2-13	Semple Stadium
2012	1	Cork	Waterford	1-19 : 0-19	Semple Stadium
2012	2	Kilkenny	Limerick	4-16 : 1-16	Semple Stadium
2013	1	Cork	Kilkenny	0-19 : 0-14	Semple Stadium
2013	2	Clare	Galway	1-23 : 2-14	Semple Stadium
2014	1	Limerick	Wexford	4-26 : 1-11	Semple Stadium
2014	2	Tipperary	Dublin	2-23 : 0-16	Semple Stadium
2015	1	Waterford	Dublin	2-21 : 1-19	Semple Stadium
2015	2	Galway	Cork	2-28 : 0-22	Semple Stadium
2016	1	Waterford	Wexford	0-21 : 0-11	Semple Stadium
2016	2	Galway	Clare	2-17 : 0-17	Semple Stadium
2017	1	Tipperary	Clare	0-28 : 3-16	Pairc Ui Chaoimh
2017	2	Waterford	Wexford	1-23 : 1-19	Pairc Ui Chaoimh
2018	1	Clare	Wexford	0-27 : 1-17	Pairc Ui Chaoimh
2018	2	Limerick	Kilkenny	0-27 : 1-22	Semple Stadium
2019	1	Kilkenny	Cork	2-27 : 3-18	Croke Park
2019	2	Tipperary	Laois	2-25 : 1-18	Croke Park

== 2020s ==
=== 2020s ===
Year	Semi-Final	Winner	Loser	Score	Venue
2020	1	Galway	Tipperary	3-23 : 2-24	Gaelic Grounds
2020	2	Waterford	Clare	3-27 : 3-18	Páirc Uí Chaoimh
2021	1	Cork	Dublin	2-26 : 0-24	Semple Stadium
2021	2	Waterford	Tipperary	4-28 : 2-27	Páirc Uí Chaoimh
2022	1	Galway	Cork	2-19 : 1-21	Páirc Uí Chaoimh
2022	2	Clare	Wexford	1-24 : 3-14	Páirc Uí Chaoimh
2023	1	Clare	Dublin	5-26 : 2-17	Gaelic Grounds
2023	2	Galway	Tipperary	1-20 : 1-18	Gaelic Grounds
2024	1	Cork	Dublin	0-26 : 0-21	Semple Stadium
2024	2	Clare	Wexford	2-28 : 1-19	Semple Stadium
2025	1	Dublin	Limerick	2-24 : 0-28	Croke Park
2025	2	Tipperary	Galway	1-28 : 2-17	Semple Stadium

== See also ==
- List of All-Ireland Senior Hurling Championship finals
- List of All-Ireland Senior Hurling Championship semi-finals
