= Stephen Walsh (hurler) =

Irish hurler

Personal information
- Native name: Stiofán Breathnach (Irish)
- Born: 20 December 1985 (age 40) Limerick, Ireland
- Height: 1.8 m (5 ft 11 in)

Sport
- Sport: Hurling
- Position: Right Corner Back
Club
- Years: Club
- 2003-: Glenroe
Inter-county
- Years: County
- 2009-2015: Limerick
Inter-county titles
- Munster titles: 1
- NHL: 1

Stephen Walsh (born 20 December 1985) is an Irish hurler who played as a right corner-back for the Limerick senior team. In July 2013, he started at right corner back against Cork in the 2013 Munster Senior Hurling Championship final which Limerick won by 024 to 0–15, their first title since 1996. He announced his retirement from the Limerick team in November 2015.

== Honours ==
Inter-county

- Munster Senior Hurling Championship (1): 2013
