= List of All-Ireland Senior Hurling Championship semi-finals =

The All-Ireland Senior Hurling Championship semi-finals are played to determine which teams will contest the All-Ireland Hurling Final. They are the penultimate phase of the All-Ireland Senior Hurling Championship, a hurling competition contested by the top twelve teams in Ireland. The semi-finals are usually contested at Croke Park, Dublin, however, some semi-finals, most likely replays, have been played at alternative venues.

== List of semi-finals by decade ==
=== Semi-final key ===
Match ended in a draw
Match was a replay
Match was a refixture
All-Ireland champions
All-Ireland runners-up

== 1800s ==
=== 1880s ===
Year	Semi-Final	Winner	Loser	Score	Venue
1887	1	Tipperary	Kilkenny	4-7-1 : 0-0-0	Urlingford
1887	2	Galway	Wexford	2-8-3 : 1-0-0	Elm Park

=== 1890s ===
Year	Semi-Final	Winner	Loser	Score	Venue
1897	1	Kilkenny	Galway	3-4 : 0-4	Jones's Road
1898	1	Tipperary	Galway	3-14 : 1-3	Athenry

== 1900s ==
=== 1900s ===
Year	Semi-Final	Winner	Loser	Score	Venue
1900	1	Tipperary	Kilkenny	1-11 : 1-8	Carrick-on-Suir
1900	2	Galway	Antrim	3-44 : 0-1	Terenure
1901	1	Wexford	Antrim	4-9 : 1-2	Jones's Road
1901	2	Cork	Galway	7-12 : 1-3	Market's Field
1902	1	Cork	Galway	10-13 : 0-0	Tipperary
1902	2	Dublin	Derry	6-19 : 0-6	Drogheda
1903	1	Cork	Galway	w/o	Market's Field
1903	2	Kilkenny	Antrim	6-29 : 3-2	Jones's Road
1904	1	Cork	Antrim	4-18 : 5-7	Jones's Road
1904	2	Kilkenny	Galway	2-8 : 1-7	St. Ciarán's Park
1905	1	Cork	Galway	5-13 : 0-4	Market's Field
1905	2	Dublin	Antrim	5-8 : 1-9	Jones's Road
1906	1	Dublin	London	4-10 : 2-2	Wexford Park
1906	2	Tipperary	Galway	7-14 : 0-2	Market's Field
1907	1	Dublin	Antrim	5-10 : 2-5	Páirc Seán Mistéal
1907	2	Cork	Galway	2-8 : 1-7	Market's Field
1908	1	Tipperary	Galway	5-15 : 1-0	Market's Field
1908	2	Dublin	Cavan	4-12 : 0-3	Jones's Road
1909	1	Tipperary	Mayo	6-7 : 5-7	Market's Field
1909	2	Kilkenny	Derry	3-17 : 0-3	Jones's Road

== 1910s ==
=== 1910s ===
Year	Semi-Final	Winner	Loser	Score	Venue
1910	1	Cork	Galway	7-3 : 1-0	St. Jarlath's Park
1910	2	Dublin	Glasgow	6-6 : 5-1	Jones's Road
1911	1	Kilkenny	Antrim	5-5 : 1-1	Jones's Road
1911	2	Limerick	Galway	8-1 : 2-0	O'Moore Park
1912	1	Limerick	Antrim	11-3 : 2-0	Jones's Road
1912	2	Kilkenny	Galway	8-3 : 2-2	Jones's Road
1913	1	Kilkenny	Lancashire	4-4 : 1-4	Liverpool
1913	2	Tipperary	Roscommon	10-0 : 0-1	Jones's Road
1914	1	Clare	Galway	6-6 : 0-0	O'Moore Park
1915	1	Clare	Galway	2-1 : 1-1	Gort
1916	1	Tipperary	Galway	8-1 : 0-0	St. Ciarán's Park
1919	1	Cork	Galway	3-8 : 0-2	Market's Field

== 1920s ==
=== 1920s ===
Year	Semi-Final	Winner	Loser	Score	Venue
1920	1	Dublin	Galway	6-3 : 1-4	Croke Park
1921	1	Limerick	Galway	6-0 : 2-2	Market's Field
1922	1	Tipperary	Galway	3-2 : 1-3	Pearse Stadium
1923	1	Limerick	Donegal	7-4 : 0-1	Croke Park
1923	2	Galway	Kilkenny	5-4 : 2-0	Croke Park
1924	1	Dublin	Antrim	8-4 : 3-1	Croke Park
1924	2	Galway	Tipperary	3-1 : 2-3	Croke Park
1925	1	Tipperary	Antrim	12-9 : 2-3	Croke Park
1925	2	Galway	Kilkenny	9-4 : 6-0	Croke Park
1926	1	Kilkenny	Galway	6-2 : 5-1	Croke Park
1927	1	Cork	Galway	5-6 : 0-2	Thurles Sporstfield
1928	1	Cork	Dublin	5-3 : 0-2	Nowlan Park
1929	1	Galway	Kilkenny	7-7 : 7-1	St. Brendan's Park

== 1930s ==
=== 1930s ===
Year	Semi-Final	Winner	Loser	Score	Venue
1930	1	Tipperary	Galway	6-8 : 2-4	St. Brendan's Park
1931	1	Kilkenny	Galway	7-2 : 3-1	Croke Park
1932	1	Clare	Galway	9-4 : 4-14	Gaelic Grounds
1933	1	Kilkenny	Galway	5-10 : 3-8	St. Cronan's Park
1934	1	Limerick	Galway	4-4 : 2-4	St. Cronan's Park
1935	1	Kilkenny	Galway	6-10 : 1-8	St. Cronan's Park
1936	1	Limerick	Galway	4-9 : 2-4	St. Cronan's Park
1937	1	Kilkenny	Galway	0-8 : 0-6	St. Brendan's Park
1938	1	Waterford	Galway	4-8 : 3-1	Cusack Park
1939	1	Kilkenny	Galway	1-16 : 3-1	St. Cronan's Park

== 1940s ==
=== 1940s ===
Year	Semi-Final	Winner	Loser	Score	Venue
1940	1	Limerick	Galway	3-6 : 0-5	Cusack Park
1941	1	Dublin	Galway	2-4 : 2-2	St. Cronan's Park
1942	1	Cork	Galway	6-8 : 2-4	Gaelic Grounds
1943	1	Antrim	Kilkenny	3-3 : 1-6	Corrigan Park
1944	1	Cork	Galway	1-10 : 3-3	Cusack Park
1944	2	Dublin	Antrim	6-12 : 3-1	Croke Park
1945	1	Kilkenny	Galway	5-3 : 2-11	St. Brendan's Park
1945	2	Tipperary	Antrim	5-9 : 1-6	Croke Park
1946	1	Cork	Galway	2-10 : 0-3	St. Brendan's Park
1946	2	Kilkenny	Antrim	7-11 : 0-7	Croke Park
1947	1	Kilkenny	Galway	2-9 : 1-11	St. Brendan's Park
1947	2	Cork	Antrim	7-10 : 0-5	Croke Park
1948	1	Dublin	Antrim	8-13 : 2-6	Croke Park
1948	2	Waterford	Galway	3-7 : 1-6	Croke Park
1949	1	Tipperary	Antrim	6-18 : 1-4	Croke Park
1949	2	Laois	Galway	4-6 : 3-5	Croke Park

== 1950s & 1969 ==
=== 1950s ===
Year	Semi-Final	Winner	Loser	Score	Venue
1950	1	Tipperary	Galway	4-7 : 2-6	St. Jarlath's Park
1951	1	Wexford	Galway	3-11 : 2-9	Croke Park
1952	1	Cork	Galway	1-5 : 0-6	Croke Park
1953	1	Galway	Kilkenny	3-5 : 1-10	Croke Park
1954	1	Wexford	Antrim	12-17 : 2-3	Croke Park
1955	1	Wexford	Limerick	2-12 : 2-3	Croke Park
1956	1	Wexford	Galway	5-13 : 1-8	Croke Park
1957	1	Waterford	Galway	4-12 : 0-11	Croke Park
1958	1	Tipperary	Kilkenny	1-13 : 1-8	Croke Park

=== 1960s ===
Year	Semi-Final	Winner	Loser	Score	Venue
1969	1	Kilkenny	London	2-15 : 1-10	Croke Park

== 1970s ==
=== 1970s ===
Year	Semi-Final	Winner	Loser	Score	Venue
1970	1	Cork	London	4-20 : 2-9	Croke Park
1970	2	Wexford	Galway	3-17 : 5-9	St. Ciarán's Park
1971	1	Kilkenny	London	2-23 : 2-8	Croke Park
1971	2	Tipperary	Galway	3-26 : 6-8	St. Brendan's Park
1972	1	Kilkenny	Galway	5-28 : 3-7	Croke Park
1972	2	Cork	London	7-20 : 1-12	Cork Athletic Grounds
1973	1	Limerick	London	1-15 : 0-7	Cusack Park
1974	1	Kilkenny	Galway	2-32 : 3-17	St. Brendan's Park
1975	1	Galway	Cork	4-15 : 2-19	Croke Park
1976	1	Wexford	Galway	5-14 : 2-23	Páirc Uí Chaoimh
1976	1	Wexford	Galway	3-14 : 2-14	Páirc Uí Chaoimh
1977	1	Cork	Galway	3-14 : 1-15	Croke Park
1978	1	Kilkenny	Galway	4-20 : 4-13	Croke Park
1979	1	Galway	Cork	2-14 : 1-13	Croke Park

== 1980s ==
=== 1980s ===
Year	Semi-Final	Winner	Loser	Score	Venue
1980	1	Galway	Offaly	4-9 : 3-10	Croke Park
1981	1	Galway	Limerick	1-8 : 0-11	Croke Park
1981	1	Galway	Limerick	4-16 : 2-17	Croke Park
1982	1	Kilkenny	Galway	2-20 : 2-10	Croke Park
1983	1	Cork	Galway	5-14 : 1-16	Croke Park
1984	1	Offaly	Galway	4-15 : 1-10	Croke Park
1984	2	Cork	Antrim	3-26 : 2-5	Croke Park
1985	1	Galway	Cork	4-12 : 5-5	Croke Park
1985	2	Offaly	Antrim	4-17 : 0-12	Croke Park
1986	1	Galway	Kilkenny	4-12 : 0-13	Croke Park
1986	2	Cork	Antrim	7-11 : 1-24	Croke Park
1987	1	Galway	Tipperary	3-20 : 2-17	Croke Park
1987	2	Kilkenny	Antrim	2-18 : 2-11	Croke Park
1988	1	Tipperary	Antrim	3-15 : 2-10	Croke Park
1988	2	Galway	Offaly	3-18 : 3-11	Croke Park
1989	1	Antrim	Offaly	4-15 : 1-15	Croke Park
1989	2	Tipperary	Galway	1-17 : 2-11	Croke Park

== 1990s ==
=== 1990s ===
Year	Semi-Final	Winner	Loser	Score	Venue
1990	1	Cork	Antrim	2-20 : 1-13	Croke Park
1990	2	Galway	Offaly	1-16 : 2-7	Croke Park
1991	1	Tipperary	Galway	3-13 : 1-9	Croke Park
1991	2	Kilkenny	Antrim	2-18 : 1-19	Croke Park
1992	1	Cork	Down	2-17 : 1-11	Croke Park
1992	2	Kilkenny	Galway	2-13 : 1-12	Croke Park
1993	1	Galway	Tipperary	1-16 : 1-14	Croke Park
1993	2	Kilkenny	Antrim	4-18 : 1-9	Croke Park
1994	1	Limerick	Antrim	2-23 : 0-11	Croke Park
1994	2	Offaly	Galway	2-13 : 1-10	Croke Park
1995	1	Clare	Galway	3-12 : 1-13	Croke Park
1995	2	Offaly	Down	2-19 : 2-8	Croke Park
1996	1	Limerick	Antrim	1-17 : 0-13	Croke Park
1996	2	Wexford	Galway	2-13 : 3-7	Croke Park
1997	1	Clare	Kilkenny	1-17 : 1-13	Croke Park
1997	2	Tipperary	Wexford	2-16 : 0-15	Croke Park
1998	1	Offaly	Clare	1-13 : 1-13	Croke Park
1998	1	Offaly	Clare	1-16 : 2-10	Croke Park
1998	1	Offaly	Clare	0-16 : 0-13	Semple Stadium
1998	2	Kilkenny	Waterford	1-11 : 1-10	Croke Park
1999	1	Cork	Offaly	0-19 : 0-16	Croke Park
1999	2	Kilkenny	Clare	2-14 : 1-13	Croke Park

== 2000s ==
=== 2000s ===
Year	Semi-Final	Winner	Loser	Score	Venue
2000	1	Offaly	Cork	0-19 : 0-15	Croke Park
2000	2	Kilkenny	Galway	2-19 : 0-17	Croke Park
2001	1	Tipperary	Wexford	1-16 : 3-10	Croke Park
2001	1	Tipperary	Wexford	3-12 : 0-10	Croke Park
2001	2	Galway	Kilkenny	2-15 : 1-13	Croke Park
2002	1	Clare	Waterford	1-16 : 1-13	Croke Park
2002	2	Kilkenny	Tipperary	1-20 : 1-16	Croke Park
2003	1	Cork	Wexford	2-20 : 3-17	Croke Park
2003	1	Cork	Wexford	3-17 : 2-7	Croke Park
2003	2	Kilkenny	Tipperary	3-18 : 0-15	Croke Park
2004	1	Kilkenny	Waterford	3-12 : 0-18	Croke Park
2004	2	Cork	Wexford	1-27 : 0-12	Croke Park
2005	1	Cork	Clare	0-16 : 0-15	Croke Park
2005	2	Galway	Kilkenny	5-18 : 4-18	Croke Park
2006	1	Cork	Waterford	1-16 : 1-15	Croke Park
2006	2	Kilkenny	Clare	2-21 : 1-16	Croke Park
2007	1	Kilkenny	Wexford	0-23 : 1-10	Croke Park
2007	2	Limerick	Waterford	5-11 : 2-15	Croke Park
2008	1	Kilkenny	Cork	1-23 : 0-17	Croke Park
2008	2	Waterford	Tipperary	1-20 : 1-18	Croke Park
2009	1	Kilkenny	Waterford	2-23 : 3-15	Croke Park
2009	2	Tipperary	Limerick	6-19 : 2-7	Croke Park

== 2010s ==
=== 2010s ===
Year	Semi-Final	Winner	Loser	Score	Venue
2010	1	Kilkenny	Cork	3-22 : 0-19	Croke Park
2010	2	Tipperary	Waterford	3-19 : 1-18	Croke Park
2011	1	Kilkenny	Waterford	2-19 : 1-16	Croke Park
2011	2	Tipperary	Dublin	1-19 : 0-18	Croke Park
2012	1	Galway	Cork	0-22 : 0-17	Croke Park
2012	2	Kilkenny	Tipperary	4-24 : 1-15	Croke Park
2013	1	Cork	Dublin	1-24 : 1-19	Croke Park
2013	2	Clare	Limerick	1-22 : 0-18	Croke Park
2014	1	Kilkenny	Limerick	2-13 : 0-17	Croke Park
2014	2	Tipperary	Cork	2-18 : 1-11	Croke Park
2015	1	Kilkenny	Waterford	1-21 : 0-18	Croke Park
2015	2	Galway	Tipperary	0-26 : 3-16	Croke Park
2016	1	Kilkenny	Waterford	2-19 : 2-17	Semple Stadium
2016	2	Tipperary	Galway	2-19 : 2-18	Croke Park
2017	1	Galway	Tipperary	0-22 : 1-18	Croke Park
2017	2	Waterford	Cork	4-19 : 0-20	Croke Park
2018	1	Galway	Clare	1-30 : 1-30	Croke Park
2018	1	Galway	Clare	1-17 : 2-13	Semple Stadium
2018	2	Limerick	Cork	3-32 : 2-31	Croke Park
2019	1	Tipperary	Wexford	1-28 : 3-20	Croke Park
2019	2	Kilkenny	Limerick	1-21 : 2-17	Croke Park

== 2020s ==
=== 2020s ===
Year	Semi-Final	Winner	Loser	Score	Venue
2020	1	Limerick	Galway	0-27 : 0-24	Croke Park
2020	2	Waterford	Kilkenny	2-27 : 2-23	Croke Park
2021	1	Limerick	Waterford	1-25 : 0-17	Croke Park
2021	2	Cork	Kilkenny	1-37 : 1-32	Croke Park
2022	1	Kilkenny	Clare	2-26 : 0-20	Croke Park
2022	2	Limerick	Galway	0-27 : 1-21	Croke Park
2023	1	Kilkenny	Clare	1-25 : 1-22	Croke Park
2023	2	Limerick	Galway	2-24 : 1-18	Croke Park
2024	2	Clare	Kilkenny	0-24 : 2-16	Croke Park
2024	2	Cork	Limerick	1-28 : 0-29	Croke Park
2025	1	Cork	Dublin	7-26 : 2-21	Croke Park
2025	2	Tipperary	Kilkenny	4-20 : 0-30	Croke Park
2026	1	Galway	Cork	2-26 : 1-18	Croke Park
2026	2	Limerick	Clare	1-21 : 1-19	Croke Park

== See also ==
- List of All-Ireland Senior Hurling Championship finals
- List of All-Ireland Senior Hurling Championship quarter-finals
