= David Breen =

Irish hurler

Personal information
- Native name: Daithí Mac Braoin (Irish)
- Born: 20 September 1985 (age 41) Limerick, Ireland
- Height: 1.95 m (6 ft 5 in)

Sport
- Sport: Hurling
- Position: Right half forward
Club
- Years: Club
- 2002-: Na Piarsaigh
Club titles
- Limerick titles: 5
- Munster titles: 4
- All-Ireland Titles: 1
Inter-county
Years	County	Apps (scores)
2009-	Limerick	19 (6-16)
Inter-county titles
- Munster titles: 1
- NHL: 1

David Breen (born 20 September 1985) is an Irish physiotherapist and hurler who played centre-forward and was the captain of the Limerick senior team.

Breen made his first appearance for the team during the 2009 championship and has become a regular member of the starting fifteen over the last few seasons. Since then he has won one National Hurling League (Division 2) winners' medal.

At club level, Breen has won both Munster and county championship winners' medals with Na Piarsaigh.

== Playing career ==
=== Club ===
Breen plays his club hurling with the Na Piarsaigh club in Limerick. After developing his hurling at juvenile levels he later came to prominence as a member of the club's minor hurling team. He enjoyed little success in this grade, however, he later joined the Na Piarsaigh under-21 team. He won a county under-21 championship title in this grade in 2004 following a defeat of Doon.

By this stage Breen had joined the club's senior hurling team. He won a county senior championship winners' medal in 2011 following a 2–18 to 0–13 defeat of Ahane. It was Na Piarsaigh's first ever championship title. Breen later won a Munster club winners' medal following a 1–13 to 0–9 victory over Crusheen in a replay.

He retired from hurling in 2015.

== Physiotherapy career ==
In November 2024, Breen joined Liverpool Football Club in the position of first-team rehabilitation physiotherapist.

He had previously been physiotherapist with Munster Rugby between 2021 and 2023, also working with rugby clubs Wasps, Leinster and Harlequins, and as physio with football teams including the Republic of Ireland national football team and the academy sides of Celtic F.C. and Manchester City.

== Honours ==
=== Club ===
- Limerick Senior Hurling Championship (5): 2011, 2013, 2015, 2017, 2018
- Munster Senior Club Hurling Championship (4): 2011, 2013, 2015,2017
- All-Ireland Senior Club Hurling Championship (1): 2016
- Limerick Under-21 Hurling Championship (1): 2004

=== Inter-county ===
- National Hurling League (Division 2) (1): 2011
- Munster Senior Hurling Championship (1): 2013

Sporting positions
Preceded by Gavin O'Mahony	Limerick Senior Hurling Captain; 2012	Succeeded by Donal O'Grady
