= Joey Boland =

Irish hurler for Dublin and Na Fianna

Personal information
- Native name: Seosamh Ó Beólláin (Irish)
- Born: 15 December 1987 (age 38) Dublin, Ireland
- Occupation: Physiotherapist
- Height: 1.88 m (6 ft 2 in)

Sport
- Sport: Hurling
- Position: Midfield
Club
- Years: Club
- 2004–: Na Fianna
Inter-county
| Years | County | Apps (scores) |
| 2007–2016? | Dublin | ? (0-27) |
Inter-county titles
- Leinster titles: 1
- NHL: 1

Joey Boland (born 15 December 1987) is an Irish hurler for Dublin and Na Fianna.

== Career ==
He made his debut on the senior hurling team in the league for Dublin in 2007 during the opening game against Wexford. Previously, Joey played for the U21 team. In 2010, Joey Boland was named as the Friends of Dublin Hurling senior hurler of the year.
