= Conor Allis =

Irish hurler

Personal information
- Native name: Conchúir Mac Alas (Irish)
- Born: 8 March 1990 (age 36) Limerick, Ireland
- Occupation: Student
- Height: 1.85 m (6 ft 1 in)

Sport
- Sport: Hurling
- Position: Centre forward
Club
- Years: Club
- 2008-: Croom
Inter-county
- Years: County
- 2012-: Limerick
Inter-county titles
- Munster titles: 1

Conor Allis (born 8 March 1990) is an Irish hurler who played as a Centre-forward for the Limerick senior team. Allis made his senior championship debut for Limerick against Tipperary on 27 May 2012 in a 1–19 to 2–20 defeat at Semple Stadium, scoring two points in the game.

== Honours ==
Limerick

- Munster Senior Hurling Championship (1): 2013
- Munster Under-21 Hurling Championship (1): 2011
