= 1996 Munster Senior Hurling Championship final =

1996 Munster Senior Hurling Championship final replay
- Event: 1996 Munster Senior Hurling Championship
Limerick	Tipperary
4-7	0-16
- Date: 14 July 1996
- Venue: Páirc Uí Chaoimh, Cork
- Man of the Match: Ciarán Carey (Limerick)
- Attendance: 40,000
- Weather: Sunny

The 1996 Munster Senior Hurling Championship finals were two hurling matches played in July 1996. The first game was played at the Gaelic Grounds in Limerick and finished in a draw 0–19 to 1–16, after Tipperary at one stage had a ten-point lead. The replay was played a week later on 14 July at Páirc Uí Chaoimh, Cork, County Cork, and saw Limerick claim their second first Munster Championship of the decade, winning on a scoreline of 4–7 to 0–16. Overall, this was Limerick's eighteenth Munster Senior Hurling Championship title.

Tipperay had defeated Waterford in the quarter-final by 1–14 to 1-11 and Kerry in the semi-final by 4–19 to 2–11 to reach the final, while Limerick had defeated Cork by 3–18 to 1–8 in the quarter-final and All-Ireland Champions Clare by 1–13 to 0–15 in the semi-final to reach the final. Both matches were screened live by RTÉ as part of The Sunday Game programme.

== Match ==
=== Details ===
7 July
Final

Limerick	0–19 – 1–16	Tipperary
G. Kirby (0–10), T. J. Ryan (0–3), F. Carroll (0–2), M. Galligan (0–1), O. O'Neill (0–1), C. Carey (0–1), Seán O'Neill (0–1).	Full Match	L. Cahill (1–3), M. Cleary (0–4), D. Ryan (0–2), T. Dunne (0–2), J. Leahy (0–2), K. Tucker (0–1). N. Eng;ish (0–1), L. McGrath (0–1).

Gaelic Grounds, Limerick
Attendance: 43,525
Referee: J. O'Leary (Cork)

14 July
Final (replay)

Limerick	4-7 – 0-16	Tipperary
O. O'Neill (2–0), F. Carroll (1–1), T. J. Ryan (1–1), D. Quigley (0–2), B. Foley (0–1). C. Carey (0–1), G. Kirby (0–1).	Report	M. Cleary (0–7), D. Ryan (0–4), N. English (0–3), L. McGrath (0–1), L. Cahill (0–1).

Páirc Uí Chaoimh, Cork
Attendance: 40,000
Referee: J. O'Leary (Cork)

== See also ==
- Limerick–Tipperary hurling rivalry
