= James Ryan (hurler) =

Irish hurler

Personal information
- Native name: Séamus Ó Riain (Irish)
- Nickname: Jimbob
- Born: 1987 (age 38–39) Garryspillane, County Limerick, Ireland

Sport
- Football Position: Centre-forward
- Hurling Position: Centre-forward
Club
- Years: Club
- Garryspillane
Club titles
	Football	Hurling
Limerick titles	0	1
Inter-county*
Years	County	Apps (scores)
2007-2010 2008-2017	Limerick (football); Limerick (hurling)	5 (0-4); 17 (0-17)
Inter-county titles
	Football	Hurling
Munster Titles	0	1
All-Ireland Titles	0	0
League titles	0	0
- *Inter County team apps and scores correct as of (20:39, 15 July 2013 (UTC)).

James Ryan (born 7 April 1987) is an Irish hurler who plays as a centre-forward for the Limerick senior teams.

Born in Garryspillane, County Limerick, Ryan arrived on the inter-county scene at the age of eighteen when he first linked up with the Limerick minor hurling team, before later lining out with the under-21 side. He made his senior debut in the 2008 National Hurling League. Ryan has since gone on to play a key part for Limerick, and has won one Munster medal and one National League (Division 2) medal. He was also a regular member of the Limerick Gaelic football team for a number of seasons.

Ryan was named as the Man of the Match in 2013 Munster Senior Hurling Championship Final as Limerick defeated Cork by 0–24 to 0–15 with Ryan scoring three points during the game.

At club level Ryan has won one championship medal with Garryspillane.

== Honours ==
Inter-county

- Munster Senior Hurling Championship (1): 2013
