= 2014 All-Ireland Senior Hurling Championship =

Championship details
- Dates: 27 April — 27 September 2014
- Teams: 15

All-Ireland champions
- Winning team: Kilkenny (35th win)
- Captain: Lester Ryan
- Manager: Brian Cody

All-Ireland Finalists
- Losing team: Tipperary
- Captain: Brendan Maher
- Manager: Eamon O'Shea

Provincial champions
- Munster: Cork
- Leinster: Kilkenny
- Ulster: Antrim
- Connacht: Not Played

Championship statistics
- No. matches played: 36
- Goals total: 115 (3.19 per game)
- Points total: 1327 (36.86 per game)
- Top Scorer: Séamus Callanan (9–50)
- Player of the Year: Richie Hogan
- All-Star Team: See here

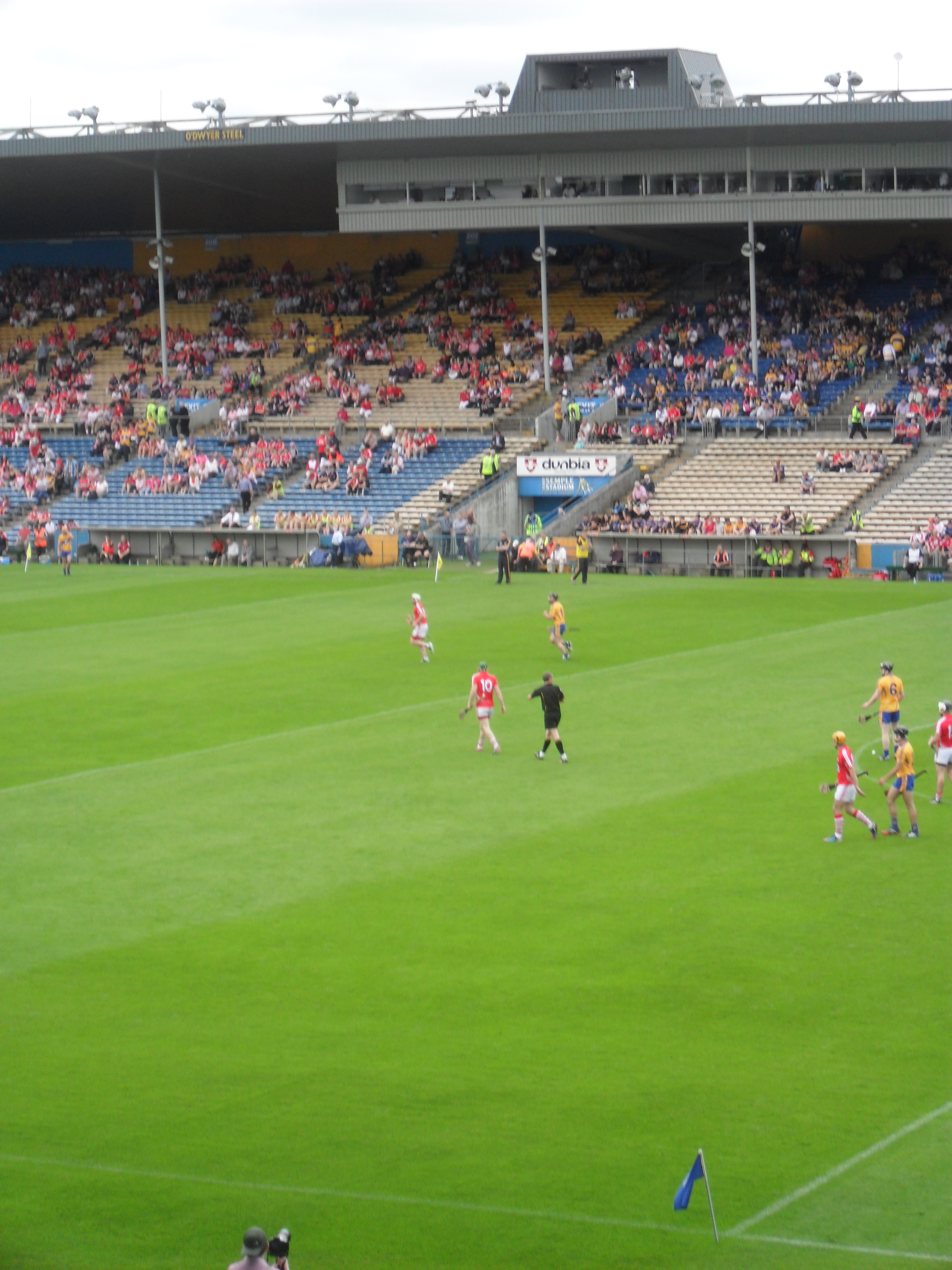
Clare v. Cork, Semple Stadium, 15 June 2014

The 2014 All-Ireland Senior Hurling Championship was the 127th staging of the All-Ireland championship since its establishment by the Gaelic Athletic Association in 1887. The draw for the 2014 fixtures took place on 3 October 2013. The championship began on 27 April 2014 and ended on 7 September 2014.

On 7 June 2014 Kilkenny versus Offaly was broadcast on Sky Sports, the first time a Championship fixture was broadcast live to a UK-wide audience. British viewers were reported to have been "amazed and confused", "bemused but impressed" and "amused and confounded" after seeing hurling for the first time.

Clare entered the championship as defending champions, however, they were defeated by Wexford. Kilkenny won the All-Ireland title following a 2–17 to 2–14 defeat of Tipperary after a replay.

== Overview ==
All teams from the 2013 championship continued to line out in hurling's top tier in 2014.

On 23 March 2013, the GAA's annual Congress adopted a proposal from the Central Competition Controls Committee (CCCC) which sought to introduce a round-robin qualifying group in Leinster for five designated counties.

Ten counties competed in the 2013 Leinster championship; however, the CCCC proposal decreased the Leinster competition to a field of five regulars, namely Kilkenny, Dublin, Wexford, Offaly and Galway, alongside two more from a round-robin qualifying group featuring Laois, Westmeath, Carlow, London and Antrim. These five teams each played four games, with the top two qualifying for the Leinster Championship quarter-finals. The fourth-placed team met the winner of the Christy Ring Cup in a promotion/relegation play-off. The bottom county faced automatic relegation to the Christy Ring Cup.

== Teams ==
=== General information ===
Fifteen counties will compete in the All-Ireland Senior Hurling Championship: ten teams in the Leinster Senior Hurling Championship and five teams in the Munster Senior Hurling Championship.

County	Last provincial title	Last championship title	Position in 2013 Championship	Appearance
Antrim	2013	—	Qualifiers preliminary round	
Carlow	—	—	Qualifiers Phase 1	
Clare	1998	2013	Champions	
Cork	2006	2005	Runners-up	
Dublin	2013	1938	Semi-finals	
Galway	2012	1988	Quarter-finals	
Kilkenny	2011	2012	Quarter-finals	
Laois	1949	1915	Qualifiers Phase 2	
Limerick	2013	1973	Semi-finals	
London	—	1901	Qualifiers preliminary round	
Offaly	1995	1998	Qualifiers preliminary round	
Tipperary	2012	2010	Qualifiers Phase 2	
Waterford	2007	1959	Qualifiers Phase 3	
Westmeath	—	—	Qualifiers Phase 1	
Wexford	2004	1996	Qualifiers Phase 3	

=== Personnel and kits ===
Team	Colours	Sponsor	Captain	Vice-captain(s)	Manager(s)
Team	Colours	Sponsor	Captain	Vice-captain(s)	Manager(s)	Antrim	Saffron and white	Creagh Concrete	Neil McManus	Kevin Ryan
Carlow	Red, green and yellow	Dan Morrissey Ltd.	Edward Coady		John Meyler
Clare	Saffron and blue	Pat O'Donnell	Patrick Donnellan		Davy Fitzgerald
Cork	Red and white	Chill Insurance	Patrick Cronin		Jimmy Barry-Murphy
Dublin	Navy and blue	AIG	John McCaffrey		Anthony Daly
Galway	Maroon and white	Supermac's	Joe Canning	David Burke	Anthony Cunningham
Kilkenny	Black and amber	Glanbia	Lester Ryan	J.J. Delaney	Brian Cody
Laois	Blue and white	MW Hire Services	Matthew Whelan		Séamus Plunkett
Limerick	Green and white	Sporting Limerick	Donal O'Grady		T. J. Ryan
London	Green and white	Bewley's Hotels			Tommy Harrell
Offaly	Green, white and gold	Carroll Cuisine	Joe Bergin		Brian Whelahan
Tipperary	Blue and gold	Škoda Auto	Brendan Maher	Noel McGrath	Eamon O'Shea
Waterford	White and blue	3	Michael "Brick" Walsh	Jake Dillon	Derek McGrath
Westmeath	Maroon and white	Renault	Eoin Price		Brian Hanley
Wexford	Purple and Gold	Gain	Garrett Sinnott		Liam Dunne

== Summary ==
=== Championships ===
Level on Pyramid	Competition	Champions	Runners up
Tier 1	2014 All Ireland Senior Hurling Championship	Kilkenny	Tipperary
Tier 1 (Leinster)	2014 Leinster Senior Hurling Championship	Kilkenny	Dublin
Tier 1 (Munster)	2014 Munster Senior Hurling Championship	Cork	Limerick
Tier 1 (Ulster)	2014 Ulster Senior Hurling Championship	Antrim	Derry
Tier 2	2014 Christy Ring Cup	Kildare	Kerry
Tier 3	2014 Nicky Rackard Cup	Tyrone	Fingal
Tier 4	2014 Lory Meagher Cup	Longford	Fermanagh

== Broadcasting ==
In the first year of a deal running from 2014 until 2016, a total of 45 provincial and All-Ireland championship matches in hurling and football were broadcast live on television in Ireland. A total of 31 games will be shown by RTÉ and 14 by Sky Sports for the first time. TV3's six year-involvement with broadcasting games came to an end in 2013. Sky Sports will also broadcast live the All-Ireland Hurling and Football semi-finals and finals along with RTÉ.

The first game to be broadcast by Sky Sports was the Leinster quarter-final between Kilkenny and Offaly in Nowlan Park on Saturday 7 June. Rachel Wyse and Brian Carney were announced as presenters of Sky's coverage, with Dave McIntyre and Mike Finnerty as commentators. Analysts for the hurling championship were Jamesie O'Connor and Nicky English.

In May, the GAA and RTÉ launched a new streaming service called GAAGO intended to stream championship games worldwide. The subscription-based service will be available to fans everywhere in the world outside of the island of Ireland, including all the games broadcast in Ireland exclusively by Sky Sports. All 45 televised games from the football and hurling championships, as broadcast by both RTÉ and Sky will be available to watch on GAAGO. For Great Britain, the games broadcast by Sky will only be available through Sky. The price for a worldwide GAAGO 'Season Pass' is €110 while in Britain, the GB Pass will be €60. A pay-per-game option is available for €10, and this will rise to €14 for the quarter-final, semi-final and final stages of the championship.

Despite massive interest in the Leinster hurling semi-final replay between Kilkenny and Galway on 28 June, the game will not be shown live on television. The throw in time is fixed for 7.00pm and Sky Sports are already covering the Ulster football semi-final between Monaghan and Armagh with the GAA's television contracts preventing live television coverage of two championship games at the same time.

These matches were broadcast live on television in Ireland

Round	RTÉ	Sky Sports
Munster Championship	Cork vs Waterford; Cork vs Waterford (replay shown online only); Limerick vs Tipperary; Cork vs Clare; Cork vs Limerick	
Leinster Championship	Galway vs Kilkenny; Kilkenny vs Dublin	Offaly vs Kilkenny; Wexford vs Dublin
Qualifiers	Clare vs Wexford; Clare vs Wexford (Replay)	Tipperary vs Galway; Tipperary vs Offaly; Wexford vs Waterford
Quarter-finals	Limerick vs Wexford; Tipperary vs Dublin	
Semi-finals	Kilkenny vs Limerick; Cork vs Tipperary	Kilkenny vs Limerick; Cork vs Tipperary
Final	Kilkenny vs Tipperary; Kilkenny vs Tipperary (Replay)	Kilkenny vs Tipperary; Kilkenny vs Tipperary (Replay)

== Leinster Senior Hurling Championship ==
=== Group Stage ===
Pos	Team	Pld	W	D	L	SF	SA	SD	Pts	Qualification
1	Antrim	4	4	0	0	3–80	5–55	19	8	Advance to quarter-finals
2	Laois	4	3	0	1	4–70	1–61	18	6	Advance to quarter-finals
3	Carlow	4	1	1	2	3–62	6–66	−13	3	
4	Westmeath	4	1	0	3	6–41	2–64	−11	2	Advance to relegation playoff
5	London	4	0	1	3	5–52	7–59	−13	1	Relegated to Christy Ring Cup

=== Knockout Stage ===
Quarter-final
Laois	0–23
Galway	1–22
Kilkenny	5–32
Offaly	1–18
Antrim	0–21
Wexford	5–19

Semi-finals
Galway (R)	5–16; 1–17
Kilkenny (R)	3–22; 3–19
Wexford	1–14
Dublin	0–22

Leinster final
Kilkenny	0–24
Dublin	1–09

=== Matches ===
Round 1

27 April 2014 Round 1	London	2–17 – 2–17	Carlow	Emerald GAA Grounds
13:00	E Kelly 0–6 (5f, 1 65), M Duggan 1–1, H Vaughan, P Phelan 0–3, L Hands 1–0, S Lambert 0–2 (2f), D Moore, P Barry 0–1.	Report	M Kavanagh 2–2, S Murphy (1f), D Murphy (2f), J Kavanagh 0–3, J Doyle 0–2, A Gaule, C Wall, R Coady, D English 0–1.	Referee: C Browne (Galway)

27 April 2014 Round 1	Antrim	0–23 – 2–11	Westmeath	Páirc Mac Uílín
15:00	P Shiels (0–12, 10fs), C Clarke, PJ O'Connell (0–3 each), E Campbell (0–2), N McManus, N McKenna, D Hamill (0–1 each).	Report	D McNicholas (2–1), N O'Brien (0–5, 4fs), E Price (0–3, 2fs), C Curley (0–2).	Referee: F Horgan (Tipperary)

Round 2

4 May 2014 Round 2	Westmeath	1–09 – 1–15	Laois	Cusack Park
	D McNicholas (1-01, 1-00f), R Greville (0-03), C Curley, D Gavin, N Conaty, N O'Brien, A Clarke (0-01 each)	Report	S Maher (1-04, 0-03f), W Hyland (0-05), N Foyle, T Fitzgerald, R King, C Dwyer, J Champion (0-01 each), M Whelan (0-01f)

4 May 2014 Round 2	Carlow	1–17 – 2–18	Antrim	Dr. Cullen Park
	M Kavanagh (1-02, 1-00p), D Murphy, (0-05, 0-04f), J Kavanagh, S Kavanagh, P Cody, A Gaule (0-02 each), R Coady, J Doyle (1-01 each)	Report	P Shiels (0–11, 0-08f), P O'Connell (2-03), C McCann (0-03), C Clarke (0-01f)

Round 3

11 May 2014 Round 3	Antrim	1–17 – 2–07	London	Páirc Mac Uílín
	P Shiels (1–10 0-04f 0-02'65), C Clarke (0-03 0-01f), N McManus, E Campbell, C Johnson, S McAfee (0-01 each)	Report	E Kelly (0-05 0-03f 0-02 '65), K Walsh, M Duggan (1-00 each) D Moore, P Phelan (0-01 each)

11 May 2014 Round 3	Laois	1–22 – 0–14	Carlow	O'Moore Park
	S Maher (0–12 0-08f), T Fitzgerald (1-00), C Dwyer, W Hyland, R King (0-02 each), D Palmer, P Whelan, N Foyle, J Brophy (0-01 each)	Report	D Murphy (0–10 0-09f), C Wall, M Kavanagh, A Gaule, D Byrne (0-01 each)

Round 4

18 May 2014 Round 4	London	0–16 – 2–13	Laois	Emerald GAA Grounds
	E Kelly (0–11, 0-09f), M Duggan (0-02, 0-02f), J Barrett (0-02, 0-02f), K Killilea (0-01).	Report	S Maher (0-06, 0-05f), N Foyle (1-01), J Brophy (1-00), M Whelan (0-02, 0-02f), J Fitzpatrick (0-01), J Purcell (0-01), W Hyland (0-01), PJ Scully (0-01)	Referee: F Horgan (Tipperary)

18 May 2014 Round 4	Carlow	0–14 – 1–09	Westmeath	Dr. Cullen Park
	D Murphy (0-07, 0-05f), S Murphy (0-04), M Kavanagh (0-01), P Coady (0-01), A Gaul (0-01).	Report	N O'Brien (0-04, 0-04f), D McNicholas (1-00, 1–00 pen), A Clarke (0-02), Eoin Price (0-02), Robbie Greville (0-01).	Referee: J Keenan (Wicklow)

Round 5

24 May 2014 Round 5	Westmeath	2–12 – 1–12	London	Cusack Park
	A Devine (2–3), N O'Brien (0–4, 3f), A Clarke (0–3), P Gilsenan (0–1), L Varley (0–1).	Report	E Kelly (1–8, 1-7f), H Vaughan (0–2), D Egan (0–1), M Duggan (0–1).	Referee: E Hassan

25 May 2014 Round 5	Laois	0–20 – 0–22	Antrim	O'Moore Park
	S Maher (0-09, 5f), W Hyland (0-05), R King (0-02), P Whelan (0-01), N Foyle (0-01), T Fitzgerald (0-01), J Campion (0-01).	Report	P Shiels (0-09, 8f), PJ O'Connell (0-04), C McCann (0-03), A Graffin (0-02), E Campbell (0-01), C Clarke (0-01), Conor Johnson (0-01), S McAfee (0-01).

=== Promotion play-off ===
14 June 2014 Promotion play-off	Westmeath	2–22 – 2–13	Kildare	Cusack Park
14:00	N O'Brien (0–11, 6f, 2'65), D McNicholas (1–2), A Devine (1–1), R Greville (0–2), D Gavin (0–2), A Clarke (0–2), A Craig (0–1), J Boyle (0–1).	Report	G Keegan (1–2), B Deay (1–1), P Divilly (0–4, 1f, 2'65), R Casey (0–2), M Moloney (0–2), M Fitzgerald (0–1), M Delaney (0–1).	Referee: J Keenan

Quarter-finals

1 June 2014 Quarter-final	Antrim	0–21 – 5–19	Wexford	O'Moore Park
14:00	P Shiels (0-06, 6f), N McManus (0-05), C McCann (0-04), D Hamill (0-04), PJ O'Connell (0-01), Conor Johnston (0-01).	report	R Jacob (2-02), C McDonald (2-02), P Morris (0-06, 5f), L Óg McGovern (1-00), P Doran (0-03), I Byrne (0-02), J Guiney (0-01), D Redmond (0-01), L Chin (0-01, 1f), L Ryan (0-01).	Referee: A Kelly (Galway)

1 June 2014 Quarter-final	Laois	0–23 – 1–22	Galway	O'Moore Park
16:00	T Fitzgerald (0-03), W Hyland (0-03), N Foyle (0-03), C Dwyer (0-03, 0-01sl), S Maher (0-03, 0-03f), T Delaney (0-02), J Fitzpatrick (0-02), B Stapleton (0-01), J Campion (0-01), J Walsh (0-01), R King (0-01).	report	C Cooney 0–7, (3f), J Glynn 1–0, N Burke, J Flynn, J Canning, C Mannion and P Brehony 0–2 each, J Coen, David Burke, D Collins, P Killeen and I Tannian 0–1 each.	Referee: C McAllister (Cork)

7 June 2014 Quarter-final	Kilkenny	5–32 – 1–18	Offaly	Nowlan Park
19:00	E Larkin 2–4, C Fennelly 1–6, TJ Reid 0–6 (2fs), M Kelly 2–0, W Walsh 0–4, M Fennelly, R Hogan, A Fogarty 0–3 each, L Ryan 0–2, P Murphy 0–1.	report	B Carroll 1–10 (6fs), S Ryan, S Dooley, D Currams, C Parlon, J Bergin, R Hanniffy, S Quirke, C Mahon 0–1 each.	Attendance: 11,841; Referee: J Owens (Wexford)

Semi-finals

14 June 2014 Semi-final	Wexford	1–14 – 0–22	Dublin	Wexford Park
19:00	P Morris (0–6, 4fs, 2 65s), P Doran (1–1), C McDonald, L Óg McGovern (0–2 each), J Guiney, D O’Keeffe, L Chin (0–1 each).	report	A McCrabbe (0–9, 6fs), C Keaney (0–5), P Ryan (0–3), M Carton (0–2), C Cronin, J Boland, D Treacy (0–1 each).	Attendance: 10,228; Referee: C Lyons (Cork)

22 June 2014 Semi-final	Galway	5–16 – 3–22	Kilkenny	O'Connor Park
16:00	C Cooney (2-07, 0-04f, 0-02 ‘65), J Canning (2–03, 2–00 pens), N Burke (1-02), J Flynn (0-02), A Smith (0-01), J Glynn (0-01).	report	TJ Reid (1-08, 0-07f), C Fennelly (1-03), R Hogan (0-05), E Larkin (1-01), P Walsh (0-02), T Walsh (0-01), A Fogarty (0-01), H Shefflin (0-01).	Attendance: 12,548; Referee: J Ryan (Tipperary)

28 June 2014 Semi-final replay	Galway	1–17 – 3–19	Kilkenny	O'Connor Park
19:00	C Cooney 0–11 (0–9 fs), J Flynn 1–1, J Canning, 0–1 (0–1 lineball), I Tannian, D Burke, A Smith 0–1.	report	TJ Reid 2–11 (0–10 fs), A Fogarty 1–1, P Walsh 0–3, R Hogan 0–2, T Walsh, E Larkin 0–1.	Attendance: 17,059; Referee: J Owens (Wexford)

Final

6 July 2014 Final	Dublin	1–09 – 0–24	Kilkenny	Croke Park
16:00	C Cronin (1-01), A McCrabbe (0-03, 0-03f), D O'Callaghan, D Sutcliffe, C McCormack (0-01 each), C Keaney (0-01, 0–01 pen)	report	TJ Reid (0–10, 0-04f, 0-04'65), C Fennelly, H Shefflin (0-03 each), P Walsh (0-02), R Hogan (0-02, 0-01f), B Hogan, W Walsh, J Power, A Fogarty (0-01 each)	Attendance: 32,567; Referee: B Kelly (Westmeath)

== Munster Senior Hurling Championship ==
Quarter-final
Waterford	1–21; 0–14
Cork	1–21; 0–28

Semi-finals
Tipperary	2–16
Limerick	2–18
Clare	2–18
Cork	2–23

Munster final
Limerick	0–24
Cork	2–24

25 May 2014 Quarter-final	Waterford	1–21 – 1–21	Cork	Semple Stadium
16:00	P Mahony (0–11, 0–09 f), A Gleeson (1-02), B O’Sullivan (0-02), B Coughlan (0-01), J Nagle (0-01), T de Búrca (0-01), J Dillon (0-01), S Walsh (0-01), E Barrett (0-01).	report	P Horgan (0–12, 0–08 frees 0-01 ’65), B Cooper (1-01), A Cadogan (0-04), A Walsh (0-02), C Lehane (0-01), S Harnedy (0-01).	Attendance: 16,025; Referee: B Gavin (Offaly)

1 June 2014 Semi-final	Tipperary	2–16 – 2–18	Limerick	Semple Stadium
16:15	G Ryan (1-02), J O’Dwyer, (0-05, 1f) S Callanan (0-05, 3f), Patrick Maher (1-00), N McGrath (0-01), N O'Meara (0-01), L Corbett (0-01), D Maher (0-01).	report	S Dowling (2–09, 1-09f), D O’Grady (0-02), K Downes (0-02), P Browne (0-01), D Hannon (0-01), G Mulcahy (0-01), S Hickey (0-01), T Ryan (0-01).	Attendance: 24,912; Referee: B Kelly (Westmeath)

8 June 2014 Quarter-final replay	Waterford	0–14 – 0–28	Cork	Semple Stadium
15:30	P Mahony (0-05, 3f, 1 65), A Gleeson (0-03), C Dunford (0-02), S O'Sullivan (0-01), B O’Sullivan (0-01), S Walsh (0-01), R Foley (0-01).	report	P Horgan (0–10, 5f), C Lehane (0-04), S Harnedy (0-03), B Cooper (0-03), D Kearney (0-02), P O’Sullivan (0-02), C Joyce (0-01), A Cadogan (0-01), S Moylan (0-01), R O'Shea (0-01).	Attendance: 22,093; Referee: J Ryan (Tipperary)

15 June 2014 Semi-final	Clare	2–18 – 2–23	Cork	Semple Stadium
16:00	Colin Ryan 0–6 (5f, 1 65), J Conlon 1–2, D Honan 1–0, C McGrath, C Galvin, N O’Connell (0–2 each), T Kelly, P Collins, P Donnellan, C McInerney 0–1 each.	report	P Horgan 2–11 (1-11f, 1–0 pen), A Cadogan, D Kearney 0–3 each, C Lehane 0–2, D Cahalane, A Walsh, W Egan, P O’Sullivan 0–1 each.	Attendance: 28,660; Referee: J McGrath (Westmeath)

13 July 2014 Final	Cork	2–24 – 0–24	Limerick	Páirc Uí Chaoimh
16:00	P Horgan (0-08, 0-06f), S Harnedy (1-02), C Lehane (0-05), P O’Sullivan (1-01), A Cadogan (0-03), A Walsh, B Cooper (0-02 each), A Nash (0-01, 0-01f)	report	S Dowling (0–12, 0-09f), G Mulcahy (0-03), D O’Grady (0-02), P O’Brien, W McNamara, J Ryan, P Browne, D Hannon, K Downes, D Breen (0-01 each)	Attendance: 36,075; Referee: B Gavin (Offaly)

== All-Ireland Qualifiers ==
Round 1
Tipperary	3–25
Galway	4–13
Antrim	1–20
Offaly	2–19

Round 2
Tipperary	5–25
Offaly	1–20

Round 1
Waterford	2–22
Laois	1–15
Clare	2–25, 2–22
Wexford	2–25 (aet), 2–25 (aet)

Round 2
Waterford	2–15
Wexford	3–15

Tipperary and Wexford qualify for the All-Ireland Senior Hurling Championship.

=== Round 1 ===
28 June 2014 Round 1	Waterford	2–22 – 1–15	Laois	Walsh Park
19:00	P Mahony 0–11 (10f), S Walsh 2–1, J Dillon 0–3, G O’Brien 0–2, D Fives, A Gleeson, C Dunford, S Prendergast, K Moran 0–1 each.	report	W Hyland 0–5, N Foyle 1–0, M Whelan (2 65s), S Maher (2f), R King (2f) & J Purcell 0–2 each, J Campion, C Dwyer 0–1 each.	Attendance: 5,025; Referee: A Kelly (Galway)

29 June 2014 Round 1	Antrim	1–20 – 2–19	Offaly	Páirc Mac Uílín
14:00	P Shiels (0-08, 4f, 1 65), PJ O’Connell (1-02), C Clarke (0-03), N McAuley (0-01), N McManus (0-01, 1f), T McCann (0-01), J McGreevy (0-01), C McCann (0-01), M Bradley (0-01), S McAfee (0-01).	report	B Carroll (1-04, 1-2f, 2 65), J Bergin (0-05, 2f), D Kenny (1-00), S Dooley (0-03), C Egan (0-02), D Currams (0-01), D Morkan (0-01), S Cleary (0-01), C Parlon (0-01); C Mahon (0-01).	Referee: J McGrath (Westmeath)

5 July 2014 Round 1	Clare	2–25 – 2–25 (a.e.t)	Wexford	Cusack Park
15:30	Colin Ryan (0–12, 0–10 frees), C McGrath (1-05), S Morey (1-00), T Kelly (0-04), C McInerney (0-02), C Dillon, Conor Ryan (0-01 each)	report	P Morris (0–10, 0–05 frees, 0-01 pen, 0-01 '65), L McGovern (1-04), C McDonald (1-01), L Chin (0-03), D Redmond, A Shore, R Jacob, J Guiney, D O'Keeffe, I Byrne (0-01 each), E Moore (0-01, 0–01 free)	Attendance: 12,871; Referee: C McAllister (Cork)

5 July 2014 Round 1	Tipperary	3–25 – 4–13	Galway	Semple Stadium
19:00	S Callanan (3-08, 0-07f), J O’Dwyer (0-06), N McGrath (0-05), L Corbett (0-02), J Woodlock, Patrick Maher, K Bergin, S McGrath (0-01 each)	report	J Glynn (2-00), J Canning (0–05, 1sl), C Cooney (0-04f), J Flynn, David Burke (1-00 each), C Mannion (0–2), P Brehony, D Glennon (0-01 each)	Attendance: 18,467; Referee: C Lyons (Cork)

12 July 2014 Round 1 replay	Wexford	2–25 – 2–22 (a.e.t)	Clare	Wexford Park
17:00	J Guiney (0–10, 0-08f), P Morris (0-07, 0-04f), C McDonald (1-01), H Kehoe (1-00), L Chin, L McGovern (0-02 each), D Redmond, D O'Keeffe, R Jacob (0-01 each)	report	J Conlon (1-05), D Honan (1-01), C Ryan (0-05, 0-04f, 0-01 ‘65’), C McGrath (0-04), T Kelly (0-03), J Shanahan (0-02), C Galvin (0-01), P Kelly (0-01, 0-01f)	Referee: J Ryan (Tipperary)

=== Round 2 ===
12 July 2014 Round 2	Tipperary	5–25 – 1–20	Offaly	O'Moore Park
19:00	S Callanan (2–10, 0-07f), L Corbett (2-02), P Maher (1-01), K Bergin (0-04), D Maher (0-02), J Woodlock, J O’Dwyer, N McGrath, T Stapleton, E Kelly, J Forde (0-01 each)	report	B Carroll (0–13, 0-10f), C Egan (1-00), J Bergin (0-03, 0-01f, 0-01 65’), C Parlon, D Currams, S Ryan, S Dooley (0-01 each)	Attendance: 9,500; Referee: A Kelly (Galway)

19 July 2014 Round 2	Waterford	2–15 – 3–15	Wexford	Nowlan Park
19.00	C Dunford (2-01), P Mahony (0-07, 6f, 1 65), A Gleeson (0-03), J Dillon (0-02), S Walsh, S Molumphy (0-01 each)	report	P Morris (1-06, 0-3f), C McDonald (1-02), D Redmond (1-00), P Doran, L Og McGovern (0–2 each), J Guiney, D O’Keeffe, I Byrne (0-01 each)	Attendance: 18,964; Referee: C Lyons(Cork)

== All-Ireland Senior Hurling Championship ==
Quarter-finals
Tipperary	2–23
Dublin	0–16
Limerick	4–26
Wexford	1–11

Semi-finals
Cork	1–11
Tipperary	2–18
Kilkenny	2–13
Limerick	0–17

Final
Tipperary	1–28, 2–14
Kilkenny	3–22, 2–17

=== Quarter-finals ===
27 July 2014 Quarter-final	Limerick	4–26 – 1–11	Wexford	Semple Stadium
2.00pm	S Dowling (2–08, 0-05f), P Browne, D Breen (1-01 each), D Hannon (0-04), G Mulcahy (0-03), S Tobin (0-03, 1f), J Ryan (0-02), W McNamara (0-01)	report	S Tomkins (1-00), D O’Keeffe (0-03), J Guiney (0-03, 1f, 1 65), P Doran, C McDonald (0-02 each), P Morris (0-01)	Attendance: 43,088; Referee: B Kelly (Westmeath)

27 July 2014 Quarter-final	Tipperary	2–23 – 0–16	Dublin	Semple Stadium
4.00pm	S Callanan (0–11, 0-07f, 0-02 ’65), J O’Dwyer (2-02, 0-01f), G Ryan (0-03), L Corbett (0-02), S McGrath, J Woodlock, Patrick Maher, N McGrath, S Bourke (0-01 each)	report	A McCrabbe (0-05f), C Keaney (0-02), P Ryan (0-02, 0–01 ’65), L Rushe, J McCaffrey, R O’Dwyer, D Sutcliffe, D Treacy, D O’Callaghan, E Dillon (0-01 each)	Attendance: 43,088; Referee: B Gavin (Offaly)

=== Semi-finals ===
10 August 2014 Semi-final	Kilkenny	2–13 – 0–17	Limerick	Croke Park
15:30	TJ Reid (0–5, frees); C Fennelly (0–4); R Hogan, R Power (1–0 each); P Walsh, M Fennelly (0–2 each).	Report	S Dowling (0–7, 4 frees, 1 65); D Hannon (0–5); G Mulcahy (0–2); D O’Grady, D Breen, S Tobin (0–1 each).	Attendance: 45,478; Referee: J McGrath (Westmeath)

17 August 2014 Semi-final	Cork	1–11 – 2–18	Tipperary	Croke Park
15:30	C Lehane (0–4); R O’Shea (1–0); A Nash, P Horgan (0–2, frees each); A Cadogan, S Harnedy, A Walsh (0–1 each).	Report	S Callanan (2–4); J O’Dwyer (0–6); S McGrath, J Woodlock (0–3 each); N McGrath (0–2).	Attendance: 68,728; Referee: J Owens (Wexford)

=== All-Ireland Final ===
7 September 2014 Final	Kilkenny	3–22 – 1–28	Tipperary	Croke Park
15:30	TJ Reid 1–8 (6f), R Power 2–1, R Hogan 0–6, E Larkin 0–2, C Fennelly, M Fennelly, C Fogarty, W Walsh, B Hogan 0–1 each.	Report	S Callanan 0–7 (2f), J O’Dwyer 0–7 (2f), Patrick Maher 1–1, N McGrath 0–4, S McGrath, L Corbett 0–2 each, J Woodlock, G Ryan, M Cahill, P Stapleton, J Forde 0–1 each.	Attendance: 82,179; Referee: B Kelly (Westmeath)

27 September 2014 Replayed Final	Kilkenny	2–17 – 2–14	Tipperary	Croke Park
17:00	TJ Reid 0–5(5f), R Power 1–1 (1 ’65′), J Power 1–1, C Fennelly 0–3, R Hogan 0–2, M Fennelly 0–2, E Larkin 0–2, P Walsh 0–1	Report	S Callanan 2–5 (4f, 0–1 pen), J O’Dwyer 0–3 (1 ’65′), S McGrath 0–3, N McGrath 0–2, B Maher 0–1	Attendance: 81,753; Referee: B Gavin (Offaly)

== Statistics ==
=== Scoring ===
- First goal of the championship:
  - Marty Kavanagh for Carlow against London (27 April 2014)
- Widest winning margin: 26 points
  - Kilkenny 5–32 – 1–18 Offaly (Leinster quarter-final)
- Most goals in a match: 8
  - Kilkenny 3–22 – 5–16 Galway (Leinster semi-final, drawn match)
- Most points in a match: 50
  - Kilkenny 5-32 - 1-18 Offaly (Leinster quarter-final)
  - Clare 2-25 - 2-25 Wexford (All-Ireland qualifier)
- Most goals by one team in a match: 5
  - Wexford 5–19 – 0–21 Antrim (Leinster quarter-final)
  - Kilkenny 5–32 – 1–18 Offaly (Leinster quarter-final)
  - Kilkenny 3–22 – 5–16 Galway (Leinster semi-final, drawn match)
  - Tipperary 5–25 – 1–20 Offaly (All-Ireland qualifier)
- Highest aggregate score: 68
  - Kilkenny 5–32 – 1–18 Offaly (Leinster quarter-final)
- Lowest aggregate score: 26
  - Carlow 0–14 – 1–9 Westmeath (Leinster qualifying group)
- Most goals scored by a losing team: 4
  - Galway 4–13 – 3–25 Tipperary (All-Ireland qualifier)

=== Top scorers ===
Overall

Rank	Player	County	Tally	Total	Matches	Average
1	Séamus Callanan	Tipperary	9–50	77	7	11.00
2	T. J. Reid	Kilkenny	4–53	65	7	9.28
3	Paul Shiels	Antrim	1–56	59	6	9.83
4	Patrick Horgan	Cork	2–43	49	5	9.80
5	Shane Dowling	Limerick	4–36	48	4	12.00
6	Paul Morris	Wexford	1–36	39	6	6.50
7	Stephen Maher	Laois	1–34	37	6	6.16
8	John O'Dwyer	Tipperary	2–30	36	7	5.14
9	Conor Cooney	Galway	2–29	35	4	8.75
10	Pauric Mahony	Waterford	0–34	34	4	8.50

Single game

Rank	Player	County	Tally	Total	Opposition
1	Séamus Callanan	Tipperary	3–8	17	Galway
1	Patrick Horgan	Cork	2–11	17	Clare
1	T. J. Reid	Kilkenny	2–11	17	Galway
4	Séamus Callanan	Tipperary	2–10	16	Offaly
5	Shane Dowling	Limerick	2–9	15	Tipperary
6	Shane Dowling	Limerick	2–8	14	Wexford
7	Conor Cooney	Galway	2–7	13	Kilkenny
7	Paul Shiels	Antrim	1–10	13	London
7	Brian Carroll	Offaly	1–10	13	Kilkenny
7	Brian Carroll	Offaly	0–13	13	Tipperary

=== Clean sheets ===
Rank	Goalkeeper	County	Clean sheets
1	Eoin Reilly	Laois	3
2	Peter Collins	Westmeath	2
2	Mark Fanning	Wexford	2
2	Anthony Nash	Cork	2
5	Chris O'Connell	Antrim	1
5	Colm Callanan	Galway	1
5	Stephen O'Keeffe	Waterford	1
5	Alan Nolan	Dublin	1
5	Darren Gleeson	Tipperary	1
5	David Herity	Kilkenny	1

=== Discipline ===
- First red card of the championship: Aaron Craig for Westmeath against Antrim (27 April 2014)

== Miscellaneous ==
- Limerick's 2–18 to 2–16 Munster semi-final defeat of Tipperary was their first victory over their near neighbours at Semple Stadium since 1973.
- Kilkenny's tally of 5–32, or 47 points, was the biggest score the Cats have posted in a championship match during Brian Cody's tenure as manager.
- For the fourth time in five years the Munster champions were defeated in their All-Ireland semi-final.
- The aggregate score of 4–50 (62) in the drawn All-Ireland final is the largest combined tally in a championship decider since 1970.
- For the third year in-a-row the All-Ireland final ends in a draw.
- Henry Shefflin of Kilkenny becomes the first player to win ten All-Ireland medals on the field of play.

== Controversies ==
=== Involvement of the British Sky Broadcasting Group ===
The decision by the GAA to grant access to satellite broadcasting company BSkyB of Championship hurling was criticised in some quarters. The first attempt by Sky Sports to cover live televised hurling – a Leinster Championship encounter between Kilkenny and Offaly – drew an audience share of less than 10 per cent of that which tuned into the free-to-air Dublin/Laois encounter at Croke Park the following day. In addition, the match was erroneously billed in advance by Sky as a "Connacht GAA football" game.

== Awards ==
Sunday Game Team of the Year

The Sunday Game team of the year was picked on 28 September, which was the night after the final replay. Richie Hogan was named the Sunday game player of the year.

- Darren Gleeson (Tipperary)
- Paul Murphy (Kilkenny)
- JJ Delaney (Kilkenny)
- Seamus Hickey (Limerick)
- Brendan Maher (Tipperary)
- Padraic Maher (Tipperary)
- Cillian Buckley (Kilkenny)
- Richie Hogan (Kilkenny)
- Conor Fogarty (Kilkenny)
- TJ Reid (Kilkenny),
- Patrick Maher (Tipperary)
- John O'Dwyer (Tipperary)
- Colin Fennelly (Kilkenny)
- Seamus Callinan (Tipperary)
- Shane Dowling (Limerick)

All Star Team of the Year

Richie Hogan was named the All Stars player of the year with Cathal Barrett named as the young player of the year at the awards ceremony on 24 October.

Pos.	Player	Team	Appearances
GK	Darren Gleeson	Tipperary	1
RCB	Paul Murphy	Kilkenny	3
FB	J. J. Delaney	Kilkenny	7
LCB	Séamus Hickey	Limerick	1
RWB	Brendan Maher	Tipperary	2
CB	Pádraic Maher	Tipperary	3
LWB	Cillian Buckley	Kilkenny	1
MD	Richie Hogan^{HOTY}	Kilkenny	2
MD	Shane McGrath	Tipperary	2
RWF	John O'Dwyer	Tipperary	1
CF	Patrick Maher	Tipperary	1
LWF	T. J. Reid	Kilkenny	2
RCF	Colin Fennelly	Kilkenny	1
FF	Séamus Callanan	Tipperary	1
LCF	Shane Dowling	Limerick	1
