= Cathal King =

Irish hurler

Personal information
- Native name: Cathal Ó Cionga (Irish)
- Born: 2004 (age 21–22) Carrig, County Tipperary, Ireland
- Occupation: Student

Sport
- Sport: Hurling
- Position: Midfield
Club
- Years: Club
- 2022-present: Carrig & Riverstown
Club titles
- Offaly titles: 1
College
- Years: College
- 2022-present: SETU Waterford
College titles
- Fitzgibbon titles: 0
Inter-county
- Years: County
- 2024-: Offaly
Inter-county titles
- Leinster titles: 0
- All-Irelands: 0
- NHL: 0
- All Stars: 0

Cathal King (born 2004) is an Irish hurler. At club level he plays with Carrig & Riverstown and at inter-county level with the Offaly senior hurling team.

== Career ==
King first played hurling to a high standard as a student at St Brendan's Community School in Birr. He was part of the school team that won the Leinster PPS SBHC title in 2020, however, the subsequent All-Ireland final against Cashel Community School was cancelled as a result of the COVID-19 pandemic. King has also lined out for SETU Waterford in the Fitzgibbon Cup.

After progressing through the juvenile and underage ranks with the Carrig & Riverstown club, King made his senior team debut in 2022. He won an Offaly IHC title the following year after beating Coolderry in the final. King was named Offaly Intermediate Hurler of the Year following this success.

King first appeared on the inter-county scene during an unsuccessful tenure with the Offaly minor hurling team. He immediately progressed to the under-20 team and was at midfield when Offaly lost the 2023 All-Ireland under-20 final to Cork. King was again eligible for the grade in 2024 and collected a winners' medal after beating Tipperary by 2–20 to 2–14 in the All-Ireland final.

King made his senior team debut in defeat by Waterford during the 2024 National Hurling League.

== Honours ==
St Brendan's Community School

- Leinster PPS Senior B Hurling Championship: 2020

Carrig & Riverstown

- Offaly Intermediate Hurling Championship: 2023

Offaly

- All-Ireland Under-20 Hurling Championship: 2024
- Leinster Under-20 Hurling Championship: 2023, 2024
