= Wayne McNamara =

Irish hurler (born 1986)

Personal information
- Native name: Uáin Mac Conmara (Irish)
- Born: 11 June 1986 (age 40) Limerick, Ireland
- Height: 1.88 m (6 ft 2 in)

Sport
- Sport: Hurling
- Position: Centre Back
Club
- Years: Club
- 2003-: Adare
Club titles
- Limerick titles: 3
Inter-county
Years	County	Apps (scores)
2006-2016	Limerick	50
Inter-county titles
- Munster titles: 1
- NHL: 1

Wayne McNamara (born 11 June 1986) is an Irish hurler who plays as a right wing-back for the Limerick senior team.

McNamara joined the team during the 2006 Senior Hurling championship and became a regular member of the starting fifteen over subsequent seasons. Since then he has won one National League (Division 2) medal. McNamara has ended up as an All-Ireland runner-up on one occasion.

At club level McNamara is a three-time county club championship medalist with Adare.

== Playing career ==
=== Club ===
McNamara is a dual player of both hurling and Gaelic football with the Adare club and has enjoyed much success.

In 2007, he lined out in his first hurling championship decider. Croom were the opponents, however, a convincing 0–14 to 0–5 victory gave McNamara his first championship medal.

Adare reached the final once again in 2008. A 0–13 to 0–8 defeat of Ahane gave McNamara a second consecutive championship medal.

In 2009, Adare were back in the championship decider and the chance to claim their first ever hat-trick of championship titles. Na Piarsaigh provided the opposition in a disappointing game. A 1–17 to 0-3 trouncing gave McNamara his third successive championship medal.

=== Inter-county ===
McNamara was drafted onto the Limerick senior hurling panel for a crucial All-Ireland qualifier against Offaly in 2006. He played no part in that game but was included on the panel again the following year, making his debut in a Waterford Crystal Cup game against the Limerick Institute of Technology.

After making some cameo appearances for Limerick, McNamara was a regular member of the starting fifteen by 2011. He won a National League (Division 2) medal that year following a 4–12 to 2–13 defeat of near neighbours Clare.

== Honours ==
=== Team ===
Adare

- Limerick Senior Club Hurling Championship (3): 2007, 2008, 2009

Limerick

- National Hurling League (Division 2) (1): 2011
- Munster Senior Hurling Championship (1): 2013
