= Paul Browne (hurler) =

Irish hurler

Personal information
- Native name: Pól de Brún (Irish)
- Born: 21 September 1989 (age 37) Bruff, County Limerick, Ireland
- Occupation: GAA development officer
- Height: 1.75 m (5 ft 9 in)

Sport
- Sport: Hurling
- Position: Midfield
Club
- Years: Club
- 2007–present: Bruff
Club titles
- Limerick titles: 0
College
- Years: College
- Limerick Institute of Technology
College titles
- Fitzgibbon titles: 0
Inter-county*
Years	County	Apps (scores)
2009–2019	Limerick	32 (2-16)
Inter-county titles
- Munster titles: 2
- All-Irelands: 1
- NHL: 0
- All Stars: 0
- *Inter County team apps and scores correct as of 18:55, 23 November 2019.

Paul Browne (born 21 September 1989) is an Irish hurler who plays for Premier Intermediate Championship club Bruff. He played for the Limerick senior hurling team for 11 seasons, during which time he usually lined out at midfield.

Browne lined out for Limerick in three different grades of hurling over a 12-year period. After making his first appearance for the minor team in June 2007, he later had an unsuccessful three-year stint with the under-21 team. Browne made his competitive debut for the senior team aged 19 in 2009. From his debut, he was ever-present as a midfielder and made a combined total of 91 National League and Championship appearances in a career that ended with his last game in 2018. During that time, Browne was vice-captain of the All-Ireland Championship-winning team in 2018. He also secured two Munster Championship medals and a National League Division 2 medal. Browne announced his retirement from inter-county hurling on 21 November 2019.

== Playing career ==
=== Limerick Institute of Technology ===
During his studies at the Limerick Institute of Technology, Browne was selected for the college's senior hurling team for the Fitzgibbon Cup.

=== Bruff ===
Browne joined the Bruff club at a young age and played in all grades at juvenile and underage levels before joining the club's top adult team. On 25 October 2014, he won a Premier Intermediate Championship medal following a 2–14 to 0–16 defeat of Croom in the final.

=== Limerick ===
==== Minor and under-21 ====
Browne first played for the Limerick minor hurling team at the age of seventeen. He made his only appearance in that grade on 23 June 2007 in a 3–21 to 0-12 Munster Championship defeat by Tipperary.

On 5 June 2008, Browne made his first appearance for the Limerick under-21 hurling team, lining out at left corner-back in Limerick's 2–17 to 1–07 defeat of Waterford. His three seasons in the under-21 grade ended with early championship defeats.

==== Senior ====
On 8 February 2009, Browne made his senior debut at midfield in a 3–13 to 1–18 defeat of Clare in the National Hurling League. Later that season he made his first championship appearance in a 1–08 to 0–11 draw with Waterford.

On 30 April 2011, Browne won a National League Division 2 medal after a 4–12 to 2–13 defeat of Clare in the final.

On 14 July 2013, Browne scored a point from midfield in Limerick's 0–24 to 0–15 defeat of Cork in the Munster final.

Browne was named vice-captain of the Limerick senior team for the 2018 season. In June 2018, he sustained a cruciate knee injury which ruled him out for the rest of the season. On 19 August 2018, Browne was a member of the extended panel when Limerick won their first All-Ireland title in 45 years after a 3–16 to 2–18 defeat of Galway in the final. Prior to the game he was invited to line-up alongside the team for the pre-match photograph.

In December 2018, Browne was included on the Limerick panel for the upcoming season. His ongoing cruciate injury ruled him out of the National League. On 30 June 2019, he won a second Munster Championship medal as a member of the extended panel after Limerick's 2–26 to 2–14 defeat of Tipperary in the final. Browne announced his retirement from inter-county hurling on 21 November 2019.

=== Munster ===
On 9 February 2014, Browne was a substitute on the Munster inter-provincial team that was defeated by Connacht in the semi-final of the Railway Cup.

== Career statistics ==
As of match played 19 August 2018.

Team	Year	National League			Munster		All-Ireland		Total	
Team	Year	Division	Apps	Score	Apps	Score	Apps	Score	Apps	Score
Limerick	2009	Division 1	7	1-02	2	0-01	4	0-03	12	1-06
Limerick	2010	Division 1	7	0-05	1	0-00	1	0-00	9	0-05
Limerick	2011	Division 2	5	0-09	1	0-00	2	0-00	8	0-09
Limerick	2012	Division 1B	6	0-03	1	0-00	2	0-01	9	0-04
Limerick	2013	Division 1B	5	0-06	2	0-01	1	0-02	8	0-09
Limerick	2014	Division 1B	6	0-07	2	0-01	3	1-02	10	1-10
Limerick	2015	Division 1B	6	0-12	2	0-00	2	1-01	10	1-13
Limerick	2016	Division 1B	7	0-19	1	0-00	2	0-02	10	0-21
Limerick	2017	Division 1B	1	0-01	1	0-02	1	0-00	3	0-03
Limerick	2018	Division 1B	7	0-09	3	0-00	0	0-00	10	0-09
Limerick	2019	Division 1A	—		0	0-00	0	0-00	0	0-00
Total			57	1-73	16	0-05	18	2-11	91	3-89

== Honours ==
Bruff

- Limerick Premier Intermediate Hurling Championship (1): 2014

Limerick

- All-Ireland Senior Hurling Championship (1): 2018 (vc)
- Munster Senior Hurling Championship (2): 2013, 2019
- National Hurling League Division 2 (1): 2011
