= Donal O'Grady (Limerick hurler) =

Irish hurler

Personal information
- Native name: Donal Ó Gráda (Irish)
- Nickname: Dodge
- Born: 3 July 1980 (age 46) Limerick, Ireland
- Occupations: Supermarket owner (Spar Ballingarry) and Funeral Director (O'Grady Undertakers)
- Height: 6 ft 0 in (183 cm)

Sport
- Sport: Hurling
- Position: Midfield
Club
- Years: Club
- Granagh-Ballingarry
Club titles
- Limerick titles: 0
Inter-county*
Years	County	Apps (scores)
2004-2016	Limerick	46 (0-28)
Inter-county titles
- Munster titles: 1
- All-Irelands: 0
- NHL: 0
- All Stars: 0
- *Inter County team apps and scores correct as of 18:11, 18 December 2019.

Donal O'Grady (born 3 July 1980) is an Irish hurler who played as a midfielder and later centre back for the Limerick senior team.

Born in Ballingarry, County Limerick, O'Grady first arrived on the inter-county scene at the age of twenty-one when he first linked up with the Limerick under-21 team. He made his senior debut in the 2004 championship. O'Grady has since gone on to play a key part for Limerick, and has won one Munster medal and one National League (Division 2) medal. O'Grady has been an All-Ireland runner-up on one occasion.

O'Grady has been a member of the Munster inter-provincial team on a number of occasions and has won two Railway Cup medals. At club level he won one intermediate championship medal with Granagh-Ballingarry.

He attended St Munchin's College, Limerick and graduated from there in 1998.

College :L.I.T

== Playing career ==
=== Granagh-Ballingarry ===
O'Grady plays his club hurling with the Granagh-Ballingarry club and has enjoyed some success.

In 2005 the club enjoyed its greatest success, with O'Grady playing a key role. After losing at the quarter-final or semi-final stage for six years in a row, the club finally reached the final of the county intermediate championship. A 4–10 to 3–10 defeat of Glenroe gave O'Grady a championship medal.

=== Limerick ===
O'Grady first came to prominence on the inter-county scene as a member of the Limerick under-21 team in 2001. He started in Limerick's opening game against Cork but was substituted after half-an-hour and failed to regain his place on the team., In spite of this he claimed Munster and All-Ireland medals as a non-playing substitute.

In 2004 O'Grady made his senior debut when he came on as a blood sub in Limerick's 1–18 to 2–12 defeat by Cork in the Munster semi-final. He was the first man from the Granagh-Ballingarry club to play senior hurling for Limerick.

After becoming a regular member of the starting fifteen the following year, O'Grady lined out in his first Munster final in 2007. Waterford provided the opposition, however, a 3–17 to 1–14 defeat was Limerick's lot on that occasion. Limerick later gained their revenge on Waterford in the All-Ireland semi-final, thus gaining qualification to a first All-Ireland decider in eleven years for the Treaty men. Kilkenny provided the opposition and got off to a flying start with Eddie Brennan and Henry Shefflin combining to score two goals within the first ten minutes. Limerick were eventually defeated on a 2–19 to 1–15 score line.

Limerick failed to build on their reasonably successful 2007 season and went into decline once again.

In late 2009 and early 2010 Limerick hurling hit an all-time low when many of the senior hurling team withdrew their services in protest at the continuation of Justin McCarthy as manager. As a result of this O'Grady played no part in the 2010 championship.

O'Grady returned to the panel in 2011 and a new management team took over. Limerick defeated Clare by 4–12 to 2–13 in the National League Division 2 final that year, giving O'Grady his first success in the senior grade.

In 2013 O'Grady was appointed captain of the Limerick senior hurling team. It was a successful year as he won a Munster medal after guiding the team to a 0–24 to 0–15 victory over Cork in the final.

=== Munster ===
O'Grady has also lined out with Munster in a number of inter-provincial campaigns and has enjoyed some success.

In 2007 he was at midfield in his debut year when Munster defeated Connacht by 2–22 to 2–19 to take the Railway Cup title. Further appearances for the province in 2008, 2009 and 2012 ended in defeat.

O'Grady won a second inter-provincial medal in 2013 following Munster's 1–22 to 0–15 defeat of Connacht.

== Honours ==
Limerick

Limerick Senior Hurling Captain 2013–2015

- Munster Senior Hurling Championship (1): 2013

Waterford Crystal Cup 2006 & 2015

NHL Div 2 League 2011

Railway Cup 2007 & 2013

All-Ireland U21 Hurling Championship 2001

Sporting positions
Preceded by David Breen	Limerick Senior Hurling Captain; 2013-2015	Succeeded by Nickie Quaid
