= 2013 All-Ireland Senior Hurling Championship =

Championship details
- Dates: 5 May — 28 September 2013
- Teams: 15

All-Ireland champions
- Winning team: Clare (4th win)
- Captain: Patrick Donnellan
- Manager: Davy Fitzgerald

All-Ireland Finalists
- Losing team: Cork
- Captain: Pa Cronin
- Manager: Jimmy Barry-Murphy

Provincial champions
- Munster: Limerick
- Leinster: Dublin
- Ulster: Antrim
- Connacht: Not Played

Championship statistics
- No. matches played: 21
- Goals total: 48 (2.28 per game)
- Points total: 710 (33.80 per game)
- Top Scorer: Colin Ryan (0–70)
- Player of the Year: Tony Kelly
- All-Star Team: See here

The 2013 All-Ireland Senior Hurling Championship was the 126th staging of the All-Ireland championship since its establishment in 1887. The draw for the 2013 fixtures took place on 4 October 2012. The championship began on 5 May 2013 and ended on 28 September 2013 with Clare winning their fourth All Ireland title after a 5–16 to 3–16 win against Cork in the replayed final.

Kilkenny were the defending champions. However, they were knocked out of the Leinster Championship by eventual Leinster champions Dublin at the semi-final stage and Cork saw them off in the All-Ireland quarter-final. Limerick won the Munster Championship for the first time since 1996. Cork defeated Dublin and Clare defeated Limerick in the All-Ireland semi-finals.

The 2013 Championship has been described by many as one of the best ever. In February 2014, the GAA announced that both the 2013 football and hurling Championships brought in €11.9m in gate receipts, an increase of €1.3m for the hurling championship.

The introduction of Hawk-Eye for Championship matches at Croke Park fell foul in a high-profile blunder by the computer system which led to use of Hawk-Eye being suspended during the All-Ireland semi-finals on 18 August. During the minor game between Limerick and Galway, Hawk-Eye ruled a point for Limerick as a miss although the graphic showed the ball passing inside the posts, causing confusion around the stadium – the referee ultimately waved the valid point wide provoking anger from fans, viewers and TV analysts covering the game live. The system was subsequently stood down for the senior game which followed, owing to "an inconsistency in the generation of a graphic". Hawk-Eye admitted they were to blame and as a result Limerick, who were narrowly defeated after extra-time, announced they would be appealing over Hawk-Eye's costly failure. The incident drew attention from the UK, where Hawk-Eye had made its debut in English soccer's Premier League the day before.

== Team changes ==
=== To Championship ===
Promoted from the Christy Ring Cup

- London

=== From Championship ===
Relegated to the Christy Ring Cup

- None

== Teams ==
All teams from the 2012 championship continued to line out in hurling's top tier in 2013.

Kilkenny were installed as the favourites to retain the All-Ireland title for a third consecutive year and to secure a remarkable tenth championship in fourteen seasons. Tipperary and Galway, the last two teams to beat Kilkenny in championship hurling, were regarded as the two teams most likely to provide the strongest challenge to Kilkenny's supremacy once again. Limerick were ranked at 20/1 as they hoped to end a forty-year wait for the Liam MacCarthy Cup. Waterford, a team who won four Munster titles between 2002 and 2010, were seen as a team to have missed out on their chance at an All-Ireland title and were ranked at 25/1. London, the winners of the 2012 Christy Ring Cup, availed of their automatic right to promotion to the top tier and joined the Leinster championship.

Prior to the championship draw it emerged that Croke Park officials had written to the Laois County Board inviting the county hurlers to participate in the 2013 Christy Ring Cup. This was prompted by Laois's poor results during the previous few seasons. In spite of these concerns Laois decided to remain in hurling's top tier and subsequently won two Leinster Championship matches.

=== General information ===
Fifteen counties will compete in the All-Ireland Senior Hurling Championship: ten teams in the Leinster Senior Hurling Championship and five teams in the Munster Senior Hurling Championship.

County	Last provincial title	Last championship title	Position in 2012 Championship	Appearance
Antrim	2012	—	Qualifiers Phase 1	
Carlow	—	—	Qualifiers Phase 1	
Clare	1998	1997	Qualifiers Phase 3	
Cork	2006	2005	Semi-finals	
Dublin	1961	1938	Qualifiers Phase 2	
Galway	2012	1988	Runners-up	
Kilkenny	2011	2012	Champions	
Laois	1949	1915	Qualifiers preliminary round	
Limerick	1996	1973	Quarter-finals	
London	—	1901	Champions (Christy Ring Cup)	
Offaly	1995	1998	Qualifiers Phase 2	
Tipperary	2012	2010	Semi-finals	
Waterford	2007	1959	Quarter-finals	
Westmeath	—	—	Qualifiers preliminary round	
Wexford	2004	1996	Qualifiers Phase 3	

=== Personnel and kits ===
County	Colours	Sponsors	Captain	Vice-captain	Manager(s)
Antrim	Saffron and white	Creagh Concrete	Neil McManus		Kevin Ryan
Carlow	Red, green and yellow	Dan Morrissey Ltd.	Edward Coady		John Meyler
Clare	Saffron and blue	Pat O'Donnell	Pat Donnellan	Brendan Bugler; Enda Barrett	Davy Fitzgerald
Cork	Red and white	Chill Insurance	Pa Cronin		Jimmy Barry-Murphy
Dublin	Navy and blue	Vodafone	John McCaffrey		Anthony Daly
Galway	Maroon and white	Supermac's	Fergal Moore		Anthony Cunningham
Kilkenny	Black and amber	Glanbia	Colin Fennelly	Henry Shefflin	Brian Cody
Laois	Blue and white	MW Hire Services	Matthew Whelan		Séamus Plunkett
Limerick	Green and white	Sporting Limerick	Donal O'Grady	Paudie O'Brien	John Allen
London	Green and white	Bewley's Hotels	John Walsh		Éamonn Phelan
Offaly	Green, white and gold	Carroll Cuisine	David Kenny		Ollie Baker
Tipperary	Blue and gold	Škoda Auto	Shane McGrath	Brendan Maher	Eamon O'Shea
Waterford	White and blue	3	Kevin Moran	Noel Connors	Michael Ryan
Westmeath	Maroon and white	Annabrook Hotel	Eoin Price		Brian Hanley
Wexford	Purple and Gold	Sports Savers	Garrett Sinnott	Richie Kehoe	Liam Dunne

== Summary ==
=== Championships ===
Level on Pyramid	Competition	Champions	Runners up
Tier 1	2013 All Ireland Senior Hurling Championship	Clare	Cork
Tier 1 (Leinster)	2013 Leinster Senior Hurling Championship	Dublin	Galway
Tier 1 (Munster)	2013 Munster Senior Hurling Championship	Limerick	Cork
Tier 1 (Ulster)	2013 Ulster Senior Hurling Championship	Antrim	Down
Tier 2	2013 Christy Ring Cup	Down	Kerry
Tier 3	2013 Nicky Rackard Cup	Donegal	Roscommon
Tier 4	2013 Lory Meagher Cup	Warwickshire	Longford

== Broadcasting ==
RTÉ and TV3 provided live coverage and highlights of matches in Ireland on The Sunday Game Live and Championship Live respectively, with RTÉ showing the All-Ireland Final live. Setanta Sports and TG4 showed highlights of matches in Ireland also. Setanta Sports broadcasts live Championship matches in Australia. Also Setanta Sports provided live matches in Asia. The Championship Live live programme was presented by Matt Cooper, usually from an on-pitch studio with analysis from Daithí Regan, Jamesie O'Connor, and Nicky English. The Sunday Game live programme was presented by Michael Lyster with analysis usually from Cyril Farrell, Ger Loughnane, Liam Sheedy, and Tomás Mulcahy. Highlights of all games were shown on The Sunday Game programme which aired usually at 9:30pm on Sundays on RTÉ Two and was presented by Des Cahill with analysis from Eddie Brennan and Donal Óg Cusack.

Television coverage, in particular that of the Leinster Hurling Championship has been criticised in some circles. Neither RTÉ or TV3 decided to broadcast both Leinster Hurling Championship semi-finals. Both channels also declined the offer from the Leinster GAA to reschedule the Dublin – Kilkenny semi-final replay in order for it to be broadcast.

These matches were broadcast live on television in Ireland

Round	RTÉ	TV3
Munster Championship	Clare vs Waterford; Limerick vs Cork	Limerick v Tipperary; Cork vs Clare
Leinster Championship	Offaly vs Kilkenny; Dublin vs Kilkenny (Replay shown online only); Dublin vs Galway	
Qualifiers	Waterford vs Kilkenny	Kilkenny v Tipperary
Quarter-finals	Cork vs Kilkenny; Galway v Clare	
Semi-finals	Dublin vs Cork; Limerick v Clare	
Final and Replay	Cork vs Clare	

== Provincial championships ==
=== Leinster Senior Hurling Championship ===
==== Bracket ====
Preliminary round
Antrim	3–18
Westmeath	2–13

First round
Antrim	0–13
Laois	1–16
Carlow	4–17
London	2–13

Quarter-finals
Laois	2–18
Carlow	0–13
Offaly	4–09
Kilkenny	0–26
Wexford (R)	1–17, 0–12
Dublin (R)	1–17, 1–17

Semi-finals
Laois	1–13
Galway	2–17
Kilkenny (R)	1–14, 0–16
Dublin (R)	0–17, 1–16

Leinster final
Galway	2–13
Dublin	2–25

5 May 2013
15:00
Preliminary round

Westmeath	2–13 – 3–18	Antrim
D McNicholas 0–5 (3f), E Price 0–4, T Doyle 1–0, N O'Brien 1–0, B Murtagh 0–2, R Greville 0–1, A Clarke 0–1.	Report	N McManus 2–4 (1–0 free), S McNaughton 0–5 (2fs, 1 65), C Carson 1–0, J McGreevey 0–2, E McCloskey 0–2, M Donnelly 0–1, T McCloskey 0–1, P Shiels 0–1, S Casey 0–1, C Clarke 0–1.

Cusack Park
Referee: J Owens (Wexford)

18 May 2013
15:00
First round

Carlow	4–17 – 2–13	London
C Doyle 3–2; M Kavanagh 0–7 (5fs, 1 pen); S Murphy 1–3; J Kavanagh 0–2; E Coady, S Kavanagh, R Coady 0–1.	Report	M Duggan 1–4; G Hennelly (3fs, 1 65), S Lambert (fs) 0–4 each; L Hands 1–0; D Reale 0–1.

Dr. Cullen Park
Referee: J Sexton (Cork)

18 May 2013
19:00
First round

Laois	1–16 – 0–13	Antrim
Z Keenan (0-05, 0-01pen); T Fitzgerald (1-01), S Maher (0-04, 2f), W Hyland (0-03), B Dunne (0-03).	Report	S McNaughton (0-05, 0-05f), N McManus (0–5, 0-02f, 0-01'65), P Shiels (0-01); J McGreevey (0-01), C McKinley (0-01).

O'Moore Park

2 June 2013
15:00
Quarter-final

Laois	2–18 – 0–13	Carlow
S Maher 0–9(7fs); W Hyland 1–1; Z Keenan 1–0(f); C Healy, M Whelan(fs), J Fitzpatrick 0–2 each; T Fitzgerald, B Duggan 0–1 each.	Report	M Kavanagh 0–4(3fs); E Coady 0–3; D English(fs), HP O'Byrne 0–2 each, JM Nolan, S Murphy 0–1 each.

O'Moore Park
Referee: J Ryan (Tipperary)

8 June 2013
19:00
Quarter-final

Wexford	1–17 – 1–17	Dublin
J Guiney (1–8, 0-6f), G Sinnott (0–4), R Jacob (0–3), H Kehoe (0–1), P Doran (0–1).	Report	J Boland (0–9, 8f), E Dillon (1–0), D Sutcliffe (0–3), M Carton (0–2), S Durkin (0–1), C McCormack (0–1), P Ryan (0–1).

Wexford Park
Attendance: 7,512
Referee: D Kirwan (Cork)

9 June 2013
14:00
Quarter-final

Offaly	4–9 – 0–26	Kilkenny
J Bergin (2–0), C Egan (1-02), S Dooley (0-05, 0-04f, 0-01'65), D Currams (1–0), B Carroll (0–1), C McDonald (0–1).	Report	E Larkin (0–11, 0-10f, 0-1'65), R Power (0–4, 0-1f), R Hogan (0–3), T Walsh (0–1), B Hogan (0–1), L Ryan (0–1), TJ Reid (0–1), C Fennelly (0–1), A Fogarty (0–1), W Walsh (0–1), M Ruth (0–1).

O'Connor Park
Attendance: 8,237
Referee: A Kelly (Galway)

15 June 2013
19:00
Quarter-final replay

Dublin	1–17 – 0–12	Wexford
P Ryan (1–9, 0-8f, 0–1 ’65), C Keaney (0–2), D Treacy (0–2), J McCaffrey (0–2), P Kelly (0–1), D Sutcliffe (0–1).	Report	J Guiney (0–5, 5f), G Sinnott (0–2), P Morris (0–2), P Doran (0–1), H Kehoe (0–1), R Jacob (0–1).

Parnell Park
Attendance: ~7,000
Referee: B Gavin (Offaly)

16 June 2013
15:30
Semi-final

Laois	1–13 – 2–17	Galway
M Whelan (0-05, 0-04f), T Fitzgerald (1-00), Z Keenan (0-03), S Maher (0-02, 0-01f), J Fitzpatrick (0-01), B Dunne (0-01), W Hyland (0-01).	Report	J Canning (0–11, 0-07f), A Callanan (1-00), D Glennon (1-00), D Hayes (0-02), D Burke (0-02), N Burke (0-01), J Regan (0-01).

O'Moore Park
Attendance: 5,387
Referee: J Owens (Wexford)

23 June 2013
15:50
Semi-final

Kilkenny	1–14 – 0–17	Dublin
E Larkin (0-07, frees), W Walsh (1-04), R Hogan (0-02), TJ Reid (0-01).	Report	J Boland (0-09, 0–07 frees), P Schutte (0-01), J McCaffrey (0-01), C Keaney (0–1), D Sutcliffe (0-01), P Ryan (0-01, free), D O’Callaghan (0-01), Mark Schutte (0-01), S Durkin (0-01).

O'Moore Park
Attendance: 9,674
Referee: J Ryan (Tipperary)

29 June 2013
19:00
Semi-final replay

Dublin	1–16 – 0–16	Kilkenny
P Ryan (0–8, six frees), D O'Callaghan (0–5, one free), D Sutcliffe (1–0), C Keaney (0–1), S Durkan (0–1), M Schutte (0–1).	Report	E Larkin (0–11, frees and two 65s), R Power (0–3), W Walsh (0–1), C Fennelly (0–1).

O'Moore Park
Attendance: 10,532
Referee: B Kelly (Westmeath)

7 July 2013
16:00
Final

Dublin	2–25 – 2–13	Galway
P Ryan 2–7 (0-4fs), D O'Callaghan 0–4, R O'Dwyer 0–3, C Keaney, J Boland, J McCaffrey, C McCormack 0–2 each, M Carton, D Sutcliffe, S Lambert 0–1 each.	Report	J Canning 1–7 (0-4fs), D Burke 1–0, C Cooney 0–2, I Tannian, J Regan, A Harte, J Glynn 0–1 each

Croke Park
Attendance: 36,657
Referee: J Ryan (Tipperary)

=== Munster Senior Hurling Championship ===
==== Bracket ====
Quarter-final
Waterford	1–15
Clare	2–20

Semi-finals
Tipperary	1–15
Limerick	1–18
Cork	0–23
Clare	0–15

Munster final
Limerick	0–24
Cork	0–15

2 June 2013
16:00
Quarter-final

Clare	2–20 – 1–15	Waterford
C Ryan (0–7, 0-6f, 0–1 '65'), T Kelly (0–4), S O'Donnell (1–0), C McGrath (1–0), J Conlon (0–3), D Honan (0–3), C Galvin (0–2), F Lynch (0–1).	Report	M Shanahan (0–7, 0-6f), J Dillon (1–2), S Prendergast (0–2), K Moran (0–1), J Barron (0–1), P Mahony (0–1), G O'Brien (0–1).

Semple Stadium
Attendance: 12,103
Referee: J McGrath (Westmeath)

9 June 2013
16:00
Semi-final

Limerick	1–18 – 1–15	Tipperary
D Hannon 0-09 (5f, 1 65), S Tobin 1-01, D O'Grady 0-03, S Dowling 0–02 (1f), D Breen, J Ryan & N Moran 0-01 each.	Report	J O'Dwyer 1-03, S Callanan 0-04f, J O'Brien 0-03, E Kelly 0-02 (1f), B Maher, N McGrath & P Bourke 0-01 each.

Gaelic Grounds
Attendance: 19,507
Referee: B Gavin (Offaly)

23 June 2013
16:00
Semi-final

Cork	0–23 – 0–15	Clare
P Horgan 0–8 (5fs), S Harnedy 0–3, J Coughlan, C Lehane, L O'Farrell 0–2 each, A Nash 0-2fs, D Kearney, C McCarthy, W Egan, P Cronin 0–1 each.	Report	P Collins 0–5, C McGrath, C Galvin, D Honan 0–2 each, C Ryan 0–2 (1f, 1 '65'), T Kelly, S O'Donnell 0–1 each.

Gaelic Grounds
Attendance: 19,054
Referee: B Kelly (Westmeath)

14 July 2013
16:00
Final

Limerick	0–24 – 0–15	Cork
D Hannon (0–8, 5 frees, 1 sideline), J Ryan, S Dowling (0–3 each), G Mulcahy, S Tobin, K Downes (0–2 each), P O’Brien, P Browne, S Hickey, N Moran (0–1 each).	Report	P Horgan (0–4, 2 frees), S Harnedy, P Cronin (0–3 each), J Coughlan (0–2 frees), L O’Farrell, D Kearney, C Naughton (0–1 each).

Gaelic Grounds
Attendance: 42,730
Referee: J McGrath (Westmeath)

=== Ulster Senior Hurling Championship ===
Quarter-finals		Semi-finals		Final
Down	3–20
Armagh	1–11	Derry	0–19, 1–16
		Down	1–16, 0–25
				Antrim	4–21
				Down	1–17

== Cup competitions ==
=== Lory Meagher Cup (Tier 4) ===
==== Group stage ====
Pos	Team	Pld	W	D	L	SF	SA	Diff	Pts	Qualification
1	Warwickshire	3	2	1	0	2–27	1–25	+5	5	Advance to Knockout Stage
2	Longford	3	2	0	1	10–35	2–32	+27	4	Advance to Knockout Stage
3	Fermanagh	3	1	1	1	4–38	7–37	−8	3	
4	Leitrim	3	0	0	3	0–19	6–25	−24	0	

==== Final ====
8 June 2013	Warwickshire	2–16 – 0–10	Longford	Croke Park
12:00	S Hennessy (0–6 3f 2 65s), E Lyons (1–3), E Gleeson (1–0), P Duggan (0–2), M Bermingham (0–2), C Maskey (0–1), C Robbins (0–1), A Morrissey (0–1)	Report	E Donnellan (0–7 6f), J O’Brien (0–2), E Daly (0-1f)	Referee: L McAuley (Antrim)

== All-Ireland qualifiers ==
Teams eliminated prior to the semi-finals of their provincial championship compete in the preliminary rounds and phase 1. Teams eliminated in the provincial semi finals take part in phase 2. Phase 3 sees the winners of phase 1 take on the winners of phase 2, with the winners advancing to the All Ireland quarter-finals

Preliminary round
Wexford	3–18
Antrim	0–17

Round 2
Wexford	2–16
Carlow	0–20
Laois	0–15
Clare	1–32

Round 3
Wexford	1–20
Clare	3–24

Preliminary round
Offaly	1–14
Waterford	0–21
Westmeath	1–14
London	0–11

Round 2
Tipperary	1–14
Kilkenny	0–20
Waterford	3–22
Westmeath	0–14

Round 3
Kilkenny	1–22
Waterford	2–16

=== Preliminary round ===
22 June 2013
19:00
Preliminary round

Offaly	1–14 – 0–21	Waterford
S Dooley (1–4, 0–4 frees); D Currams, K Brady, J Bergin, B Carroll (0–2 each); C Mahon, D Morkan (0–1 each).	Report	M Shanahan (0–13, 5 frees); B O’Sullivan (0–3); J Dillon (0–2); K Moran, S O’Sullivan, P Prendergast (0–1 each).

O'Connor Park
Attendance: 8,200
Referee: J McGrath (Westmeath)

22 June 2013
15:00
Preliminary round

Wexford	3–18 – 0–17	Antrim
J Guiney (0–8, 3fs, 2 65s, 1 sideline), R Jacob, P Morris (1–2 each), G Sinnott (0–4), P Doran (1–0), E Martin (free), S Murphy (0–1 each).	Report	N McManus (0–6, 2 frees), S McNaughton (0–5, 0–3 frees), J McGreevey, K Stewart (1 free) (0–2 each), C Carson, C McGuinness 0–1 each.

Wexford Park
Attendance: 2,500
Referee: J Sexton (Cork)

22 June 2013
16:30
Preliminary round

London	0–11 – 1–15	Westmeath
M Finn (0–5, 5f), D Reale (0–2), J Walsh (0–1), PJ Rowe (0–1), S Lambert (0–1), M Duggan (0–1).	Report	D McNicholas (0–11, 7f), B Murtagh (1–1), R Greville (0–2), J Shaw (0–1).

Emerald GAA Grounds
Attendance: 300
Referee: C Lyons (Cork)

=== Phase 1 ===
29 June 2013
19:00
Phase 1

Wexford	2–16 – 0–20	Carlow
J Guiney (0–10, 9f), P Doran (1–0), D Redmond (1–0), R Jacob (0–2), C Kenny (0–1), G Sinnott (0–1), E Quigley (0–1).	Report	D English (0–10, 9f), C Doyle (0–2), J M Nolan (0–2), R Coady (0–1), J Kavanagh (0–1), E Byrne (0–1), M Brennan (0–1), S Murphy (0–1), A Gaule (0–1).

Wexford Park
Referee: A Kelly (Galway)

29 June 2013
17:00
Phase 1

Westmeath	0–14 – 3–22	Waterford
D McNicholas (0-06, 0-05f), B Murtagh (0-03), E Price (0-02), J Shaw (0-01), A Clarke (0-01), T Doyle (0-01).	Report	M Shanahan (1-09, 0-05f), B O'Sullivan (2-02), S Prendergast (0-03), K Moran (0-02), J Dillon (0-02), J Barron (0-01), S Fives (0-01), D Fives (0-01), S O'Sullivan (0-01).

Cusack Park
Referee: D Kirwan (Cork)

=== Phase 2 ===
6 July 2013
19:00
Phase 2

Kilkenny	0–20 – 1–14	Tipperary
E Larkin 0–11 (8f), R Hogan, W Walsh 0–3 each; R Power 0–2, C Fennelly 0–1.	Report	E Kelly 0–5 (5f, 1 '65), L Corbett 1–0, J O'Dwyer 0–3, S Callanan 0–2, J O'Brien, N McGrath, K Bergin, J Woodlock 0–1 each.

Nowlan Park
Attendance: 23,307
Referee: B Gavin (Offaly)

6 July 2013
15:00
Phase 2

Clare	1–32 – 0–15	Laois
C Ryan 0–11 (8f, 2 '65s'), P Duggan 0–4, D Honan, C McGrath 0–3 each, S O'Donnell 1–0, P Collins 0–2, T Kelly, P Donnellan, J Conlon, C Galvin, B Bugler, L Markham, D McInerney, C Dillon, P O'Connor 0–1 each.	Report	S Maher 0–5 (3f), Z Keenan 0–4 (1f), W Hyland 0–3, PJ Scully 0–2, J Brophy 0–1.

Cusack Park
Attendance: 7,500
Referee: C Lyons (Cork)

=== Phase 3 ===
13 July 2013
19:00
Phase 3

Waterford	2–16 – 1–22 (AET)	Kilkenny
R Barry (1–3), J Dillon (1–2, 1f), D Fives (0–3), K Moran (0–3), J Nagle (0-1f), R Foley (0–1), S Prendergast (0–1), B O'Sullivan (0–1), J Barron (0–1).	Report	R Power (1–5, 1–0 pen, 3f), R Hogan (0–5), E Larkin (0–4, 3f), C Fennelly (0–4), A Fogarty (0–2), M Ruth (0–1), M Fennelly (0–1).

Semple Stadium
Attendance: 17,235
Referee: J Owens (Wexford)

13 July 2013
17:00
Phase 3

Wexford	1–20 – 3–24 (AET)	Clare
J Guiney (1–8, 0–6 frees); D Redmond, P Morris, P Doran, G Moore (0–2 each); G Sinnott, C Kenny, C McDonald, M O’Regan (0–1 each).	Report	C Ryan (0–10, six frees, two 65s); C McInerney (2–1); S O’Donnell (1–1); T Kelly (0–5, 0–1 pen); J Conlon (0–3); B Bugler, P Collins, S Morey, A Cunningham (0–1 each).

Semple Stadium
Attendance: 17,235
Referee: D Kirwan (Cork)

== All-Ireland Senior Hurling Championship ==
=== Bracket ===
Teams in bold advanced to the next round. The provincial champions are marked by an asterisk.

**Quarter-finals**; 28 July
**Cork**	**0–19**
Kilkenny	0–14
Galway	2–14
**Clare**	**1–23**

**Semi-finals**; 11/18 August
Dublin*	1–19
**Cork**	**1–24**
Limerick*	0–18
**Clare**	**1–22**

**All-Ireland final** 8/28 September
Cork (R)	3–16 (3–16)
**Clare** (R)	0–25 **(5–16)**

=== All-Ireland quarter-finals ===
28 July 2013
14:00
Quarter-final

Cork	0–19 – 0–14	Kilkenny
P Horgan (0–11, 8 frees), C Lehane, P Cronin (0–2 each), L O’Farrell, J Coughlan, S Harnedy, S Moylan (0–1 each).	Report	E Larkin (0–6, 3 frees, one 65), R Power (one free), M Fennelly (0–2 each), P Murphy, A Fogarty, T Walsh, W Walsh (0–1 each).

Semple Stadium
Attendance: 33,383
Referee: B Kelly (Westmeath)

28 July 2013
16:00
Quarter-final

Galway	2–14 – 1–23	Clare
J Canning (0–7, five frees, one 65), D Hayes (0–3), J Glynn, N Healy (1–0 each), A Harte, C Donnellan, D Burke (free), J Cooney (0–1 each).	Report	C Ryan (0–10, eight frees), C McGrath (1–2), P Collins (0–4), J Conlon, D Honan, P O’Connor, B Bugler, T Kelly, F Lynch, N O’Connell (0–1 each).

Semple Stadium
Attendance: 33,383
Referee: B Gavin (Offaly)

=== All-Ireland semi-finals ===
11 August 2013
15:30
Semi-final

Dublin	1–19 – 1–24	Cork
P Ryan (6f) 0-06; D Sutcliffe 0-04; D Treacy 1-01; C Keaney, D O'Callaghan 0-02 each; S Durkin, J McCaffrey, J Boland, R O'Dwyer 0-01 each.	Report	P Horgan (5f) 1-07; L McLoughlin, A Nash (3f), C Lehane 0-03 each; S Harnedy, L O'Farrell 0-02 each; D Kearney, J Coughlan, P Cronin, S Moylan 0-01 each.

Croke Park
Attendance: 62,092
Referee: J Owens (Wexford)

18 August 2013
15:30
Semi-final

Limerick	0–18 – 1–22	Clare
S Dowling 0–6 (5f, 1 65'), D Hannon (2f), P Browne, G O'Mahony 0–2 each, C Allis, J Ryan, G Mulcahy, D Breen, T Ryan, K Downes 0–1 each.	Report	C Ryan 0–11 (9f), T Kelly 0–4, D Honan 1–0, P Collins 0–3, P Donnellan, P O'Connor, C Galvin, C McInerney 0–1 each.

Croke Park
Attendance: 62,962
Referee: J Ryan (Tipperary)

=== All-Ireland final ===
8 September 2013
15:30
Final

Clare	0–25 – 3–16	Cork
Colin Ryan (0–12, 11f), T Kelly (0-03), P Collins (0-03), C McGrath (0-02), J Conlon (0-02), D O'Donovan (0-01), Conor Ryan (0-01), D Honan (0-01).	Report	P Horgan (0–10, 8f), C Lehane (1-01), P Cronin (1-00), A Nash (1-00, f), D Kearney (0-02), S Harnedy (0-02), B Murphy (0-01).

Croke Park
Attendance: 81,653
Referee: B Gavin (Offaly)

28 September 2013
17:00
Final Replay

Clare	5–16 – 3–16	Cork
J Conlon (0-02), T Kelly (0-03), Colin Ryan (0-07f), S O’Donnell (3-03), D Honan (1-00), C McGrath (1-01).	Report	A Nash (1-00, f), L McLoughlin (0-01), S Harnedy (1-02), P Cronin (0-01), C Lehane (0-02), P Horgan (0-09, 7f), S Moylan (1-01)

Croke Park
Attendance: 82,276
Referee: James McGrath (Westmeath)

== Statistics ==
=== Scoring ===
- First goal of the championship: Niall O'Brien for Westmeath against Antrim (Leinster preliminary round, 5 May 2013)
- Widest winning margin: 20 points
  - Clare 1–32 – 0–15 Laois (qualifier phase 1)
- Most goals in a match: 8
  - Clare 5–16 – 3–16 Cork (All-Ireland final replay)
- Most points in a match: 47
  - Clare 1-32 - 0-15 Laois (qualifier phase 1)
- Most goals by one team in a match: 5
  - Clare 5–16 – 3–16 Cork (All-Ireland final replay)
- Highest aggregate score: (70 minutes) 56 points
  - Clare 5–16 – 3–16 Cork (All-Ireland final replay)
- Lowest aggregate score: 29 points
  - Antrim 0–11 – 1–15 Westmeath (qualifier preliminary round)
- Most goals scored by a losing team: 4
  - Offaly 4–9 – 0–26 Kilkenny (Leinster quarter-final)

==== Top scorers ====
Overall

Rank	Player	County	Tally	Total	Matches	Average
1	Colin Ryan	Clare	0–70	70	8	8.75
2	Patrick Horgan	Cork	1–49	52	6	8.7
3	Eoin Larkin	Kilkenny	0–50	50	6	8.33
4	Jack Guiney	Wexford	2–39	45	5	9.00
5	Paul Ryan	Dublin	3–32	41	6	6.83

Single game

Rank	Player	County	Tally	Total	Opposition
1	Maurice Shanahan	Waterford	0–13	13	Offaly
1	Paul Ryan	Dublin	2–7	13	Galway
2	Colin Ryan	Clare	0–12	12	Cork
2	Paul Ryan	Dublin	1–9	12	Wexford
2	Maurice Shanahan	Waterford	1–9	12	Westmeath
2	Shane O'Donnell	Clare	3–3	12	Cork
3	Craig Doyle	Carlow	3–2	11	London
3	Jack Guiney	Wexford	1–8	11	Dublin
3	Jack Guiney	Wexford	1–8	11	Clare
3	Eoin Larkin	Kilkenny	0–11	11	Offaly
3	Joe Canning	Galway	0–11	11	Laois
3	Derek McNicholas	Westmeath	0–11	11	London
3	Eoin Larkin	Kilkenny	0–11	11	Dublin
3	Eoin Larkin	Kilkenny	0–11	11	Tipperary
3	Colin Ryan	Clare	0–11	11	Laois
3	Patrick Horgan	Cork	0–11	11	Kilkenny
5	Neil McManus	Antrim	2–4	10	Westmeath
5	Patrick Horgan	Cork	1–7	10	Dublin
5	Jack Guiney	Wexford	0–10	10	Carlow
5	David English	Carlow	0–10	10	Wexford
5	Colin Ryan	Clare	0–10	10	Wexford
5	Colin Ryan	Clare	0–10	10	Galway
21	Joey Boland	Dublin	0–9	9	Wexford
21	Declan Hannon	Limerick	0–9	9	Tipperary
21	Stephen Maher	Laois	0–9	9	Carlow
21	Joey Boland	Dublin	0–9	9	Kilkenny

=== Miscellaneous ===
- In Carlow's defeat of London in the first round of the Leinster championship, Craig Doyle became the first player in the history of the championship to score three goals after coming on as a substitute.
- In the Leinster semi-final replay, Dublin record a championship defeat of Kilkenny for the first time since 1942.
- The Leinster final was notable for a number of reasons. It was the first final to feature neither Kilkenny or Wexford since 1990. The meeting of Dublin and Galway in the provincial decider was a first, while it was also their first championship meeting since 1942. Dublin maintained their 100% success rate over Galway, with a sixth win from six meetings, to claim the Leinster title for the first time since 1961.
- The Munster final between Cork and Limerick was the sides' first meeting at this stage of the championship since 1992. Limerick's victory was their first provincial title since 1996.
- Cork and Kilkenny's All-Ireland quarter-final meeting at Semple Stadium was their first championship meeting outside of Croke Park since 1907.
- For the first time since 1951, Kilkenny did not play a single championship game in Croke Park. It is also the first time since 1996 that Kilkenny failed to qualify for an All-Ireland semi-final.
- The All-Ireland semi-final between Cork and Dublin was the sides' first meeting in the All-Ireland series since 1952.
- The All-Ireland semi-final between Clare and Limerick was the sides' first ever meeting at this stage of the championship.
- The All-Ireland final was notable for a number of reasons. It was the second ever all-Munster All-Ireland decider and the first time since 1997 that this has happened. It was the first time since 2004 that neither the Leinster or Munster champions contested the All-Ireland final. It was the first ever All-Ireland final meeting of Cork and Clare. For the second successive year the All-Ireland final ended in a draw. The replay was also unique as it was the first All-Ireland final to be played on a Saturday.
- Clare win their fourth All-Ireland title to draw level with Galway and Offaly as joint seventh on the all-time roll of honour.
- Clare's victory also marked the first time a team outside the traditional "Big Three" of hurling (Kilkenny, Cork and Tipperary) had won the All-Ireland since Offaly in 1998.

=== Notable matches ===
2013 will be remembered as a year that the traditionally weaker counties made an impact.

Limerick who hadn't been in an All-Ireland Final since 2007 beat reigning Munster Champions Tipperary by 3 points, 1–18 to 1–15 in a Munster semi-final.

Clare under David Fitzgerald held off Waterford in a Munster Quarter-final winning by 2–20 to 1–15. They were overcome by a stronger Cork side in the Munster Semi-final losing 0–23 to 0–15.

Laois made it to the Leinster semi-final where they put it up to Galway even leading by a point at half time [0-08 – 0-07], but Galway's physicality helped them run out 7 point victors [2–17 – 1–13].

Dublin came into the season after a disappointing 2012 season and a hammering by Tipperary in the league semi-final [4–20 0–17]. In their Leinster Quarter-final they drew with Wexford, 1–17 – 1–17 but in the replay ran out easy 8 point winners, 1–17 – 0–12.

Offaly jumped to a 1–01 to 0–00 start against Kilkenny in their quarter-final clash. They led at half time by 2–06 to 0–11 but failed to stop Kilkenny, although they managed to score 4 goals as Kilkenny won 0–26 to 4–09.

In their semi-final Dublin ran at Kilkenny and held out for a draw in the match, 0–17 – 1–14. In the replay Dublin raced to a 0–04 to 0–01 lead after 10 mins and lead 0–11 to 0–07 at half time. They ran out 3 point winners, 1–17 0–17. Dublin made it to a Leinster final while Kilkenny where exiled to the qualifiers for a second year.

Kilkenny fought hard against Tipperary and sent them out of the Championship, winning by three points.

Dublin beat Galway by 12 points to claim their first Leinster title in 52 years.

Kilkenny knocked out Waterford in the final stage of the Qualifiers after extra time.

Carlow lead Wexford for most of their game in the qualifiers, until a late goal sent them out.

At the quarter-final stage, Cork knocked out Championship favourites and title holders, Kilkenny. Clare knocked out Galway, the previous year's runners-up.

Both Provincial Champions were beaten in the semi-finals. Cork defeated Dublin after the game of the season by 1–24 to 1–19, and Clare beat Limerick by 1–22 to 0–18.

The 2013 Championship was described by many as one of the best ever.

== Awards ==
Monthly awards

Month	GAA/GPA Player of the Month	
Month	Player	County
May	Cahir Healy	Laois
June	Richie McCarthy	Limerick
July	Paul Ryan	Dublin
August	Tony Kelly	Clare
September	Shane O'Donnell	Clare

Sunday Game Team of the Year

The Sunday Game team of the year was picked on 28 September, which was the night of the final replay. Clare's victorious All-Ireland winning side had seven players in the hurling team of the year. Tony Kelly of Clare was also picked as The Sunday Game player of the year.

- Anthony Nash (Cork)
- Shane O’Neill (Cork)
- David McInerney (Clare)
- Peter Kelly (Dublin)
- Brendan Bugler (Clare)
- Liam Rushe (Dublin)
- Pat Donnellan (Clare)
- Paul Browne (Limerick)
- Colm Galvin (Clare)
- Seamus Harnedy (Cork)
- Tony Kelly (Clare)
- Danny Sutcliffe (Dublin)
- Podge Collins (Clare)
- Patrick Horgan (Cork)
- Conor McGrath (Clare)

GAA/GPA All Stars

The 2013 All-Star hurling team were announced on 6 November. Speaking at the announcement, GAA President Liam O'Neill said "This year's hurling selection was of particular interest to hurling followers everywhere after the incredible year we had, the players who have made the final cut can take particular satisfaction on doing so in a season of stiff competition as new teams and players emerged – something evidenced in the final make up of the team, I congratulate all 15 players – and those who were nominated too – as their inclusion further underlines their roles as excellent ambassadors through their commitment and dedication to the pursuit of excellence."

Pos.	Player	Team	Appearances
GK	Anthony Nash	Cork	2
RCB	Richie McCarthy	Limerick	1
FB	Peter Kelly	Dublin	1
LCB	David McInerney]	Clare	1
RWB	Brendan Bugler	Clare	2
CB	Liam Rushe	Dublin	1
LWB	Patrick Donnellan	Clare	1
MD	Colm Galvin	Clare	1
MD	Conor Ryan	Clare	1
RWF	Séamus Harnedy	Cork	1
CF	Tony Kelly	Clare	1
LWF	Danny Sutcliffe	Dublin	1
RCF	Podge Collins	Clare	1
FF	Patrick Horgan	Cork	1
LCF	Conor McGrath	Clare	1

Tony Kelly of Clare was named Young Hurler of the Year and Hurler of the Year for 2013 at the All Stars award ceremony on 8 November at Croke Park.

== Media ==
=== DVD release ===
In December 2013, LIAM 13 a double DVD was released containing highlights of the 2013 hurling championship season along with full match coverage of the final and final replay.

=== Documentary ===
A documentary called The Magic of Hurling aired on 27 December 2013 on RTÉ Two. This documentary featured Davy Fitzgerald, Anthony Daly and Ger Loughnane talking to Ger Canning about the 2013 year in hurling and discussing the tactics that brought the All-Ireland title to Clare.

== See also ==
- 2013 Clare county hurling team season
- 2013 Tipperary county hurling team season
