= 2013 Clare county hurling team season =

Hurling competition in Ireland

Clare county hurling team
2013 hurling season
| Manager | Davy Fitzgerald |
| All-Ireland SHC | Winners |
| Munster SHC | Semi-finalists |
| National League | 6th Division 1A |
| Top scorer Championship | Colin Ryan (0-70) |
| Highest SHC attendance | 82,276 (v Cork) All-Ireland Final Replay |
| Lowest SHC attendance | 7,500 (v Laois) All-Ireland Qualifier |

The 2013 season was Davy Fitzgerald's second year as manager of the Clare senior hurling team. Clare went on to win their fourth All-Ireland Senior Hurling Championship after a 5–16 to 3–16 win against Cork in the final on 28 September.

== 2013 squad ==
- Manager: Davy Fitzgerald
- Selectors: Mike Deegan, Louis Mulqueen
- Strength and Conditioning Coach: Joe O'Connor
- Trainer: Paul Kinnerk
- Physios: Diarmuid Horgan, Mary O'Keeffe
- Medical: Dr. Padraic Quinn M.D.
- Team Manager: Seoirse Bulfin
- Backroom Team: Aimee McInerney, Tom Stackpool, Padraig McMahon, Seanie McMahon, Tommy Hegarty, John O' Sullivan, Fergie McDonagh

| No. | Player | Position | Club |
|---|---|---|---|
| 1 | Patrick Kelly | Goalkeeper | Inagh-Kilnamona |
| 2 | Domhnall O'Donovan | Right corner back | Clonlara |
| 3 | David McInerney | Full back | Tulla |
| 4 | Cian Dillon | Left corner back | Crusheen |
| 5 | Brendan Bugler | Right half back | Whitegate |
| 6 | Patrick Donnellan | Centre back | O'Callaghan Mills |
| 7 | Pat O'Connor | Left half back | Tubber |
| 8 | Colm Galvin | Midfield | Clonlara |
| 9 | Conor Ryan | Midfield | Cratloe |
| 10 | John Conlon | Right half forward | Clonlara |
| 11 | Tony Kelly | Centre forward | Ballyea |
| 12 | Colin Ryan | Left half forward | Newmarket-On-Fergus |
| 13 | Podge Collins | Right corner forward | Cratloe |
| 22 | Shane O'Donnell | Full forward | Éire Óg, Inis |
| 15 | Conor McGrath | Left corner forward | Cratloe |

| No. | Player | Position | Club |
|---|---|---|---|
| 16 | Donal Tuohy | Goalkeeper | Crusheen |
| 17 | Conor Cooney | Back | O'Callaghan Mills |
| 18 | Séadna Morey | Back | Sixmilebridge |
| 19 | Liam Markham | Midfield | Cratloe |
| 20 | Nicky O'Connell | Midfield | Clonlara |
| 21 | Fergal Lynch | Forward | Clooney Quin |
| 14 | Darach Honan | Forward | Clonlara |
| 23 | Cathal McInerney | Forward | Cratloe |
| 24 | Peter Duggan | Forward | Clooney Quin |
| 25 | Jonathan Clancy | Forward | Clarecastle |
| 26 | Paul Flanagan | Back | Ballyea |
| 27 | Cathal O'Connell | Forward | Clonlara |
| 28 | Aaron Cunningham | Forward | Wolfe Tones na Sionna |
| 29 | Alan O'Neill | Back | St.Josephs Doora Barefield |
| 30 | Davy O'Halloran | Forward | Éire Óg, Ennis |
| 31 | Stephen O'Halloran | Back | Clarecastle |
| 32 | Seán Collins | Forward | Cratloe |
| 33 | Mark Flaherty | Forward | Killanena |
| 34 | Derek Fahy | Goalkeeper | Sixmilebridge |
| 35 | Patrick Kelly | Back | Clarecastle |
| 36 | Jamie Shanahan | Forward | Sixmilebridge |
| 37 | Killian Ryan | Back | Ruan |

== 2013 Waterford Crystal Cup ==
Clare faced defending champions Tipperary in the final under lights in Thurles on 9 February, with Clare winning by 1–21 to 1–13.

27 January
Quarter-final

| Clare | 3-13 - 1-13 | University of Limerick |
|---|---|---|
| N O’Connell (1-3) 0-1 ‘65, 0-1 f, S Morey (1-0), A O’Neill (1-0), C O’Connell (0-3) f’s, F Lynch (0-2), D OHalloran (0-2), C Ryan, E Barrett, T Kelly (0-1) each. | Report P Kelly; D McInerney, J McInerney, C Cooney; B Bugler, P Donnellan, P Kelly (Clarecastle); N O’Connell, C Ryan; F Lynch, T Kelly, E Barrett; D O’Halloran, A O’Neill, C O’Connell. Subs: S O’Donnell for C O’Connell (46), P O’Connor for P Kelly (Clarecastle) (58), S Morey for Lynch (58), J Clancy for O’Halloran (60) | K Morris (1-6) 0-6 f’s, A Ryan (0-2), D Butler, C Malone, S Golden, P Walsh, G Brennan (0-1) each. |

O'Garney Park, Sixmilebridge
Referee: J Sexton (Cork)

3 February
Semi-final

| Cork | 2-11 - 0-20 | Clare |
|---|---|---|
| A Mannix 2-1, P Horgan 0-4 (3f), C Murphy 0-2, C McCarthy, D Lordan, R O’Shea, J Coughlan 0-1 each. | Report D Tuohy; D O’Donovan, C Duggan, B O’Connell; B Bugler, P Donnellan, P O’Connor; N O’Connell, S Morey; C Ryan, P Collins, E Barrett; S O’Donnell, A O’Neill, J Clancy. Subs: D McInerney for B O’Connell (45), T Kelly for Collins, M Flaherty for O’Neill, C O’Connell for Clancy (all 55), D O’Halloran for O’Donnell (66) | C Ryan 0-8 (6f), N O’Connell 0-6 (5f), P Collins, S O’Donnell 0-2 each, C O’Connell, J Clancy 0-1 each. |

Sixmilebridge
Referee: J Ryan (Tipperary)

10 February
Final

| Clare | 1-21 - 1-13 | Tipperary |
|---|---|---|
| C Ryan 0-9 (7f, 1 ’65′), T Kelly 0-5, S O’Donnell 1-1, S Morey, F Lynch 0-2 each, E Barrett, A O’Neill 0-1 each. | Report P Kelly; D O’Donovan, J McInerney, D McInerney; B Bugler, P Donnellan, P O’Connor; F Lynch, S Morey; C Ryan, T Kelly, E Barrett; P Collins, A O’Neill, S O’Donnell. Subs: P Duggan for Lynch (53), J Clancy for Collins (62), D O’Halloran for O’Donnell (64), L Markham for Barrett (66), D Honan for O’Neill (70+1) | E Kelly 0-6 (5f), P Maher 1-0, S Bourke, S Callanan (1f) 0-2, B O’Meara, J O’Brien, N McGrath (f) 0-1 each. |

Semple Stadium
Referee: G O’Connell (Cork)

== 2013 National Hurling League ==
On 14 April, Clare defeated Cork by two points after extra-time in the League Division 1A relegation playoff to retain their league status in division 1. Speaking after the game manager Davy Fitzgerald said "It’s a good win, we beat Cork in a relegation play-off – that’s it, we’re not going to get carried away by it, we won’t beat the likes of Waterford with so many wides. Cork could just as easily have won that game, we know there’s still a long road to go."

=== Results ===
| 24 February 2013 Round 1 | Clare | 1-17 - 2-15 | Waterford | Cusack Park, Ennis |
| 14:00 | C Ryan 0-9 (0-5f, 0-1 ’65), T Kelly 1-4, S Morey 0-2, F Lynch, S O’Donnell 0-1 each. | Report | J Dillon 1-5 (0-3f), S Prendergast 1-1, B O’Halloran 0-4, P Mahony 0-3 (0-3f), D Fives, B O’Sullivan 0-1 each. | Referee: J Sexton (Cork) |

| 10 March 2013 Round 2 | Clare | 0-18 - 1-13 | Galway | Cusack Park, Ennis |
| 14:00 | Colin Ryan 0-8 (0-7f), T Kelly, J Conlon 0-3 each, P Collins 0-2, S O'Donnell, F Lynch 0-1 each. | Report | J Canning 1-9 (1-8f), D Glennon, A Harte, A Smith, N Donoghue 0-1 each | Referee: C Lyons (Cork) |

| 16 March 2013 Round 3 | Cork | 1-16 - 1-22 | Clare | Páirc Uí Chaoimh, Cork |
| 19:00 | P Horgan 0-9 (0-8fs), L O’Farrell 1-0, S Harnedy, L McLoughlin and P O’Sullivan 0-2 each, D Kearney 0-1. | Report | Colin Ryan 0-12 (0-9fs), T Kelly 0-4, S O’Donnell 1-0, J Conlon 0-2, P O’Connor, Conor Ryan, N O’Connell and D Honan 0-1 each. | Referee: J Ryan (Tipperary) |

| 24 March 2013 Round 4 | Clare | 1-15 - 3-10 | Kilkenny | Cusack Park, Ennis |
| 14:00 | Colin Ryan (0-11, 10f), C Galvin (1-0), T Kelly (0-1), S O'Donnell (0-1), J Conlon (0-1), D Honan (0-1). | Report | E Larkin (0-5, 4f, '65), A Fogarty (1-2), G Aylward (1-1), L Ryan (1-1), R Hogan (0-1). | Referee: A Stapleton (Laois) |

| 31 March 2013 Round 5 | Tipperary | 3-19 - 1-14 | Clare | Semple Stadium, Thurles |
| 15:00 | E Kelly 2-8 (1-6 frees); S Bourke 0-4; L Corbett 1-1; N McGrath 0-3; B Maher 0-2; M Cahill 0-1 each. | Report | Colin Ryan 0-8 (7 frees, 1 65); T Kelly 1-1; J Conlan 0-2; S Morey, Conor Ryan, F Lynch 0-1 each. | Referee: J Owens (Westmeath) |

| 14 April 2013 Relegation play-off | Clare | 0-31 - 2-23 (AET) | Cork | Gaelic Grounds, Limerick |
| 15:00 | Colin Ryan 0-10 (6f), T Kelly 0-6, J Conlon 0-4, C Galvin 0-3, D Honan, C McGrath 0-2 each, P Kelly (f), F Lynch, P Collins and C McInerney, 0-1 each. | Report | P Horgan 0-11 (6f, 1 65), P Cronin 1-3, L O’Farrell 1-2, C Naughton 0-2, C O’Sullivan, D Kearney, C Lehane, S Moylan and C McCarthy 0-1 each. | Attendance: 5,204; Referee: J McGrath (Westmeath) |

=== Division 1A ===
NHL semi-finals Relegated team

| Team | Pld | W | D | L | F | A | Diff | Pts |
|---|---|---|---|---|---|---|---|---|
| Tipperary | 5 | 3 | 0 | 2 | 10-85 | 4-93 | 10 | 6 |
| Kilkenny | 5 | 3 | 0 | 2 | 6-81 | 8-71 | 4 | 6 |
| Galway | 5 | 2 | 1 | 2 | 7-71 | 6-81 | -5 | 5 |
| Waterford | 5 | 2 | 1 | 2 | 3-72 | 4-75 | -6 | 5 |
| Cork | 5 | 1 | 2 | 2 | 6-78 | 4-80 | 4 | 4 |
| Clare | 5 | 2 | 0 | 3 | 4-86 | 10-73 | -5 | 4 |

== 2013 Munster Senior Hurling Championship ==
2 June 2013
16:00
Munster Quarter-final

| Clare | 2-20 - 1-15 | Waterford |
|---|---|---|
| C Ryan (0-7, 0-6f, 0-1 '65'), T Kelly (0-4), S O'Donnell (1-0), C McGrath (1-0), J Conlon (0-3), D Honan (0-3), C Galvin (0-2), F Lynch (0-1). | Report | M Shanahan (0-7, 0-6f), J Dillon (1-2), S Prendergast (0-2), K Moran (0-1), J Barron (0-1), P Mahony (0-1), G O'Brien (0-1). |

Semple Stadium
Attendance: 12,103
Referee: J McGrath (Westmeath)

23 June 2013
16:00
Munster Semi-final

| Cork | 0-23 - 0-15 | Clare |
|---|---|---|
| P Horgan 0-8 (5fs), S Harnedy 0-3, J Coughlan, C Lehane, L O'Farrell 0-2 each, A Nash 0-2fs, D Kearney, C McCarthy, W Egan, P Cronin 0-1 each. | Report | P Collins 0-5, C McGrath, C Galvin, D Honan 0-2 each, C Ryan 0-2 (1f, 1 '65'), T Kelly, S O'Donnell 0-1 each. |

Gaelic Grounds
Attendance: 19,054
Referee: B Kelly (Westmeath)

== 2013 All-Ireland Senior Hurling Championship ==
6 July 2013
15:00
Qualifiers Phase 2

| Clare | 1-32 - 0-15 | Laois |
|---|---|---|
| C Ryan 0-11 (8f, 2 '65s'), P Duggan 0-4, D Honan, C McGrath 0-3 each, S O'Donnell 1-0, P Collins 0-2, T Kelly, P Donnellan, J Conlon, C Galvin, B Bugler, L Markham, D McInerney, C Dillon, P O'Connor 0-1 each. | Report | S Maher 0-5 (3f), Z Keenan 0-4 (1f), W Hyland 0-3, PJ Scully 0-2, J Brophy 0-1. |

Cusack Park
Attendance: 7,500
Referee: C Lyons (Cork)

13 July 2013
17:00
Qualifiers Phase 3

| Wexford | 1-20 - 3-24 (AET) | Clare |
|---|---|---|
| J Guiney (1-8, 0-6 frees); D Redmond, P Morris, P Doran, G Moore (0-2 each); G Sinnott, C Kenny, C McDonald, M O’Regan (0-1 each). | Report | C Ryan (0-10, six frees, two 65s); C McInerney (2-1); S O’Donnell (1-1); T Kelly (0-5, 0-1 pen); J Conlon (0-3); B Bugler, P Collins, S Morey, A Cunningham (0-1 each). |

Semple Stadium
Attendance: 17,235
Referee: D Kirwan (Cork)

28 July 2013
16:00
All-Ireland Quarter-final

| Galway | 2-14 - 1-23 | Clare |
|---|---|---|
| J Canning (0-7, five frees, one 65), D Hayes (0-3), J Glynn, N Healy (1-0 each), A Harte, C Donnellan, D Burke (free), J Cooney (0-1 each). | Report | C Ryan (0-10, eight frees), C McGrath (1-2), P Collins (0-4), J Conlon, D Honan, P O’Connor, B Bugler, T Kelly, F Lynch, N O’Connell (0-1 each). |

Semple Stadium
Attendance: 33,383
Referee: B Gavin (Offaly)

18 August 2013
15:30
All-Ireland Semi-final

| Limerick | 0-18 - 1-22 | Clare |
|---|---|---|
| S Dowling 0-6 (5f, 1 65'), D Hannon (2f), P Browne, G O'Mahony 0-2 each, C Allis, J Ryan, G Mulcahy, D Breen, T Ryan, K Downes 0-1 each. | Report | C Ryan 0-11 (9f), T Kelly 0-4, D Honan 1-0, P Collins 0-3, P Donnellan, P O'Connor, C Galvin, C McInerney 0-1 each. |

Croke Park
Attendance: 62,962
Referee: J Ryan (Tipperary)

=== All-Ireland Final Drawn Game ===
Clare got the opening score of the third minute with a point from Darach Honan. and were ahead by 012 to 0–10 at half time. After 40 minutes Conor Lehane scored the opening goal of the same with a shot past the goalkeeper from the right and into the net to make the score 1–10 to 0–14. Cork got a second goal in the 57th minute when goalkeeper Anthony Nash hit a 20-yard free to the net after Luke O'Farrell had been fouled. With seven minutes left on the clock, Cork captain Patrick Cronin hit a shot to the top left corner of the net to level the game. Patrick Horgan looked to have won it for Cork with a point in the last minute. Added on time of two minutes was already up when Clare right-back Domhnall O'Donovan received the ball out on the left before hitting the ball over the bar just as he was tacked to tie up the match. The referee blew the final whistle after 2 minutes and 38 seconds to bring the match to a replay three weeks later.

8 September 2013
15:30
Final

| Clare | 0-25 - 3-16 | Cork |
|---|---|---|
| D O'Donovan (0-01), Conor Ryan (0-01), J Conlon (0-02), T Kelly (0-03), Colin Ryan (0-12, 11f), P Collins (0-03), D Honan (0-01), C McGrath (0-02). | Report | A Nash (1-00, f), B Murphy (0-01), D Kearney (0-02), S Harnedy (0-02), P Cronin (1-00), C Lehane (1-01), P Horgan (0-10, 8f) |

Croke Park
Attendance: 81,651
Referee: Brian Gavin (Offaly)

CLARE GAA:
| 1 | Patrick Kelly |
| 2 | Domhnall O'Donovan |
| 3 | David McInerney |
| 4 | Cian Dillon |
| 5 | Brendan Bugler |
| 6 | Patrick Donnellan (c) |
| 7 | Patrick O'Connor |
| 8 | Colm Galvin |
| 9 | Conor Ryan |
| 10 | John Conlon |
| 11 | Tony Kelly |
| 12 | Colin Ryan |
| 13 | Podge Collins |
| 14 | Darach Honan |
| 15 | Conor McGrath |
Substitutes Used:
| 23 | Cathal McInerney for D. Honan |
| 21 | Fergal Lynch for J. Conlon |
| 20 | Nicky O'Connell for C. McGrath |
Manager:
Davy Fitzgerald

Cork GAA:
| 1 | Anthony Nash |
| 2 | Stephen McDonnell |
| 3 | Shane O'Neill |
| 4 | Conor O'Sullivan |
| 5 | Brian Murphy |
| 6 | Christopher Joyce |
| 7 | William Egan |
| 8 | Lorcán McLoughlin |
| 9 | Daniel Kearney |
| 10 | Séamus Harnedy |
| 11 | Pa Cronin (c) |
| 12 | Conor Lehane |
| 13 | Luke O'Farrell |
| 14 | Patrick Horgan |
| 15 | Jamie Coughlan |
Substitutes Used:
| 24 | Stephen Moylan for J. Coughlan |
| 22 | Cian McCarthy for L. McLoughlin |
| 23 | Cathal Naughton for C. McCarthy |
| 20 | Stephen White for D. Kearney |
Manager:
Jimmy Barry-Murphy

=== All-Ireland Final Replay ===
John Conlon got the opening score of the game, a point in the second minute. A hat-trick of goals in the 6th, 14th and 19th minutes at the hill 16 end from late call-up Shane O'Donnell put Clare on the way to a four-point lead of 3–9 to 1–11 at half time. Anthony Nash had blasted a 20-metre free past 12 Clare players on the line for a goal that brought Cork back to within three points in the 16th minute. Clare then led by eight points but Cork had drawn level, 1–16 to 3–10, by the 52nd minute. With 18 minutes left the scores were level at 1–16 to 3-10 and they were level again with ten minutes left when Séamus Harnedy scored with a low shot to the net to make the score 2–16 to 3–13. In the 61st minute, Clare's Conor McGrath ran at goals and fired the ball high to the left corner of the net for Clare's fourth goal. Darach Honan, who came on as a second-half substitute got Clare's fifth goal in the 71st minute after he received the ball on the right and managed to get as far as the Cork goals before pushing the ball past the goalkeeper with the ball rolling over the line.

28 September 2013
17:00
Final Replay

| Clare | 5-16 - 3-16 | Cork |
|---|---|---|
| J Conlon (0-02), T Kelly (0-03), Colin Ryan (0-07f), S O’Donnell (3-03), D Honan (1-00), C McGrath (1-01). | Report | A Nash (1-00, f), L McLoughlin (0-01), S Harnedy (1-02), P Cronin (0-01), C Lehane (0-02), P Horgan (0-09, 7f), S Moylan (1-01) |

Croke Park
Attendance: 82,276
Referee: James McGrath (Westmeath)

CLARE GAA:
| 1 | Patrick Kelly |
| 2 | Domhnall O'Donovan |
| 3 | David McInerney |
| 4 | Cian Dillon |
| 5 | Brendan Bugler |
| 6 | Patrick Donnellan (c) |
| 7 | Patrick O'Connor |
| 8 | Colm Galvin |
| 9 | Conor Ryan |
| 10 | John Conlon |
| 11 | Tony Kelly |
| 12 | Colin Ryan |
| 13 | Podge Collins |
| 22 | Shane O'Donnell |
| 15 | Conor McGrath |
Substitutes Used:
| 23 | Cathal McInerney for C.Galvin (52 mins) |
| 20 | Nicky O'Connell for P.Collins (59 mins) |
| 14 | Darach Honan for S. O'Donnell (66 mins) |
| 18 | Séadna Morey for T. Kelly (71 mins) |
Manager:
Davy Fitzgerald

Cork GAA:
| 1 | Anthony Nash |
| 2 | Stephen McDonnell |
| 3 | Shane O'Neill |
| 4 | Conor O'Sullivan |
| 5 | Brian Murphy |
| 6 | Christopher Joyce |
| 7 | William Egan |
| 8 | Lorcán McLoughlin |
| 9 | Daniel Kearney |
| 10 | Séamus Harnedy |
| 11 | Cian McCarthy |
| 12 | Pa Cronin (c) |
| 13 | Luke O'Farrell |
| 14 | Patrick Horgan |
| 15 | Conor Lehane |
Substitutes Used:
| 20 | Stephen White for W. Egan (23 mins) |
| 24 | Stephen Moylan for L O’Farrell (half time) |
| 19 | Tom Kenny for D. Kearney (39 mins) |
| 23 | Cathal Naughton for C. McCarthy (55 mins) |
| 17 | Kilian Murphy for S. McDonnell (67 mins) |
Manager:
Jimmy Barry-Murphy

== Awards ==
The nominations for the 2013 GAA-GPA Hurling All-Stars were announced on 2 October with Clare receiving thirteen nominations. Cian Dillon and Patrick O’Connor were the only Clare players not nominated. The final team selection was made on 6 November before the team being presented with their awards two days later at a banquet at Croke Park. Clare's won eight places on the All-Stars team with David McInerney, Brendan Bugler, Pat Donnellan, Colm Galvin, Conor Ryan, Tony Kelly, Pádraic Collins and Conor McGrath all winning awards.

Clare had two of the three nominations for the GPA Hurler of the Year, Tony Kelly and Pádraic Collins of Clare. All three nominations for the GPA Young Hurler of the Year were from Clare, Tony Kelly, Pádraic Collins, and David McInerney from Clare.

Tony Kelly was named Young Hurler of the Year and Hurler of the Year for 2013 at the All Stars award ceremony on 8 November at Croke Park.

== DVD release ==
On 29 November, a behind-the-scenes documentary on the Clare hurling team during 2013 called Behind the Banner was released.

== Team holiday ==
An 80-strong party of Clare hurlers, their partners and officials flew out in early January 2014 for a 10-day end of year holiday taking in Boston, Cancun in Mexico and New York.
