= 2013 All-Ireland Senior Hurling Championship final =

2013 All-Ireland Senior Hurling Final
- Event: 2013 All-Ireland Senior Hurling Championship
Clare	Cork
0-25 5-16	3-16 3-16
- Date: 8 September 2013 (first game); 28 September 2013 (replay)
- Venue: Croke Park, Dublin
- Man of the Match: Conor Ryan (first game); Shane O'Donnell (replay)
- Referee: Brian Gavin (Offaly) (first game); James McGrath (Westmeath) (replay)
- Attendance: 81,651 (first game); 82,276 (replay)
- Weather: Partly Cloudy (first game); 14 °C (57 °F); Mostly Cloudy (replay); 17 °C (63 °F)

The 2013 All-Ireland Senior Hurling Championship Final, the deciding game of the 2013 All-Ireland Senior Hurling Championship, was played on 8 September 2013 at Croke Park, Dublin. For the second straight year, the final ended in a draw, requiring a replay that was held on 28 September 2013 at Croke Park.

In the replay Clare beat Cork 5–16 to 3–16 to claim their fourth All Ireland title. The replay has been described by some as one of the greatest finals of all time.

The game between Cork and Clare was an all Munster All-Ireland for the second time ever, the first having been in 1997 between Clare and Tipperary.

The drawn final was shown live in Ireland on RTÉ2 as part of The Sunday Game live programme, presented by Michael Lyster from Croke Park, with studio analysis from Cyril Farrell, Liam Sheedy, and Eddie Brennan and pre-match comments from Tomás Mulcahy and Ger Loughnane. Match commentary was provided by Ger Canning with analysis by Michael Duignan. The replay was shown live in Ireland on RTÉ2 as part of The Saturday Game live programme, presented by Michael Lyster from Croke Park, with studio analysis from Cyril Farrell, Liam Sheedy, and Eddie Brennan. Match commentary was provided by Ger Canning with analysis by Michael Duignan.

The drawn match was preceded by the Galway against Waterford minor hurling final which started at 1.15pm and was won by Waterford, their first minor title in 65 years.

A peak Irish television audience of 1.3 million people watched RTÉ's coverage of the drawn final with an average audience of 885,000 viewers, a 64% share of the available television audience.

== Background ==
This All-Ireland final was the 50th championship meeting of Cork and Clare; however, it was their first meeting in an All-Ireland decider. Cork held the balance of power in all previous meetings between the two, having recorded 34 championship victories to Clare's eleven. There had been four drawn games. Both sides last met in the 2013 Munster semi-final, when Cork recorded a 0–23 to 0–15 victory. It was their seventh successive championship defeat of Clare, extending the record which stretches back to the 1998 Munster semi-final when Clare last defeated Cork. In total it was the fifth meeting between the counties in 2013, with Clare having won the first three before Cork prevailed in the Munster semi-final.

Cork, who last played in the final in 2006 when they lost by three points to Kilkenny, were bidding to win the title for the first time since 2005 while Clare, who last reached the final in 2002, had won their last All-Ireland in 1997.

== Route to the Final ==
=== Cork ===
23 June 2013
16:00
Munster Semi-final

Cork	0-23 - 0-15	Clare
P Horgan 0-8 (5fs), S Harnedy 0-3, J Coughlan, C Lehane, L O'Ferrall 0-2 each, A Nash 0-2fs, D Kearney, C McCarthy, W Egan, P Cronin 0-1 each.	Report	P Collins 0-5, C McGrath, C Galvin, D Honan 0-2 each, C Ryan 0-2 (1f, 1 '65'), T Kelly, S O'Donnell 0-1 each.

Gaelic Grounds
Attendance: 19,054
Referee: B Kelly (Westmeath)

14 July 2013
16:00
Munster Final

Limerick	0-24 - 0-15	Cork
D Hannon (0-8, 5 frees, 1 sideline), J Ryan, S Dowling (0-3 each), G Mulcahy, S Tobin, K Downes (0-2 each), P O’Brien, P Browne, S Hickey, N Moran (0-1 each).	Report	P Horgan (0-4, 2 frees), S Harnedy, P Cronin (0-3 each), J Coughlan (0-2 frees), L O’Farrell, D Kearney, C Naughton (0-1 each).

Gaelic Grounds
Attendance: 42,730
Referee: J McGrath (Westmeath)
28 July 2013
14:00
All-Ireland Quarter-final

Cork	0-19 - 0-14	Kilkenny
P Horgan (0-11, 8 frees), C Lehane, P Cronin (0-2 each), L O’Farrell, J Coughlan, S Harnedy, S Moylan (0-1 each).	Report	E Larkin (0-6, 3 frees, one 65), R Power (one free), M Fennelly (0-2 each), P Murphy, A Fogarty, T Walsh, W Walsh (0-1 each).

Semple Stadium
Attendance: 33,383
Referee: B Kelly (Westmeath)

11 August 2013
15:30
All-Ireland Semi-final

Dublin	1-19 - 1-24	Cork
P Ryan (6f) 0-06; D Sutcliffe 0-04; D Treacy 1-01; C Keaney, D O'Callaghan 0-02 each; S Durkin, J McCaffrey, J Boland, R O'Dwyer 0-01 each.	Report	P Horgan (5f) 1-07; L McLoughlin, A Nash (3f), C Lehane 0-03 each; S Harnedy, L O'Farrell 0-02 each; D Kearney, J Coughlan, P Cronin, S Moylan 0-01 each.

Croke Park
Attendance: 62,092
Referee: J Owens (Wexford)

=== Clare ===
2 June 2013
16:00
Munster Quarter-final

Clare	2-20 - 1-15	Waterford
C Ryan (0-7, 0-6f, 0-1 '65'), T Kelly (0-4), S O'Donnell (1-0), C McGrath (1-0), J Conlon (0-3), D Honan (0-3), C Galvin (0-2), F Lynch (0-1).	Report	M Shanahan (0-7, 0-6f), J Dillon (1-2), S Prendergast (0-2), K Moran (0-1), J Barron (0-1), P Mahony (0-1), G O'Brien (0-1).

Semple Stadium
Attendance: 12,103
Referee: J McGrath (Westmeath)

23 June 2014
16:00
Munster Semi-final

Cork	0-23 - 0-15	Clare
P Horgan 0-8 (5fs), S Harnedy 0-3, J Coughlan, C Lehane, L O'Farrell 0-2 each, A Nash 0-2fs, D Kearney, C McCarthy, W Egan, P Cronin 0-1 each.	Report	P Collins 0-5, C McGrath, C Galvin, D Honan 0-2 each, C Ryan 0-2 (1f, 1 '65'), T Kelly, S O'Donnell 0-1 each.

Gaelic Grounds
Attendance: 19,054
Referee: B Kelly (Westmeath)

6 July 2013
15:00
Qualifiers Phase 2

Clare	1-32 - 0-15	Laois
C Ryan 0-11 (8f, 2 '65s'), P Duggan 0-4, D Honan, C McGrath 0-3 each, S O'Donnell 1-0, P Collins 0-2, T Kelly, P Donnellan, J Conlon, C Galvin, B Bugler, L Markham, D McInerney, C Dillon, P O'Connor 0-1 each.	Report	S Maher 0-5 (3f), Z Keenan 0-4 (1f), W Hyland 0-3, PJ Scully 0-2, J Brophy 0-1.

Cusack Park
Attendance: 7,500
Referee: C Lyons (Cork)

13 July 2013
17:00
Qualifiers Phase 3

Wexford	1-20 - 3-24 (AET)	Clare
J Guiney (1-8, 0-6 frees); D Redmond, P Morris, P Doran, G Moore (0-2 each); G Sinnott, C Kenny, C McDonald, M O’Regan (0-1 each).	Report	C Ryan (0-10, six frees, two 65s); C McInerney (2-1); S O’Donnell (1-1); T Kelly (0-5, 0-1 pen); J Conlon (0-3); B Bugler, P Collins, S Morey, A Cunningham (0-1 each).

Semple Stadium
Attendance: 17,235
Referee: D Kirwan (Cork)

28 July 2013
16:00
All-Ireland Quarter-final

Galway	2-14 - 1-23	Clare
J Canning (0-7, five frees, one 65), D Hayes (0-3), J Glynn, N Healy (1-0 each), A Harte, C Donnellan, D Burke (free), J Cooney (0-1 each).	Report	C Ryan (0-10, eight frees), C McGrath (1-2), P Collins (0-4), J Conlon, D Honan, P O’Connor, B Bugler, T Kelly, F Lynch, N O’Connell (0-1 each).

Semple Stadium
Attendance: 33,383
Referee: B Gavin (Offaly)

18 August 2013
15:30
All-Ireland Semi-final

Limerick	0-18 - 1-22	Clare
S Dowling 0-6 (5f, 1 65'), D Hannon (2f), P Browne, G O'Mahony 0-2 each, C Allis, J Ryan, G Mulcahy, D Breen, T Ryan, K Downes 0-1 each.	Report	C Ryan 0-11 (9f), T Kelly 0-4, D Honan 1-0, P Collins 0-3, P Donnellan, P O'Connor, C Galvin, C McInerney 0-1 each.

Croke Park
Attendance: 62,962
Referee: J Ryan (Tipperary)

== Pre-match - Drawn game ==
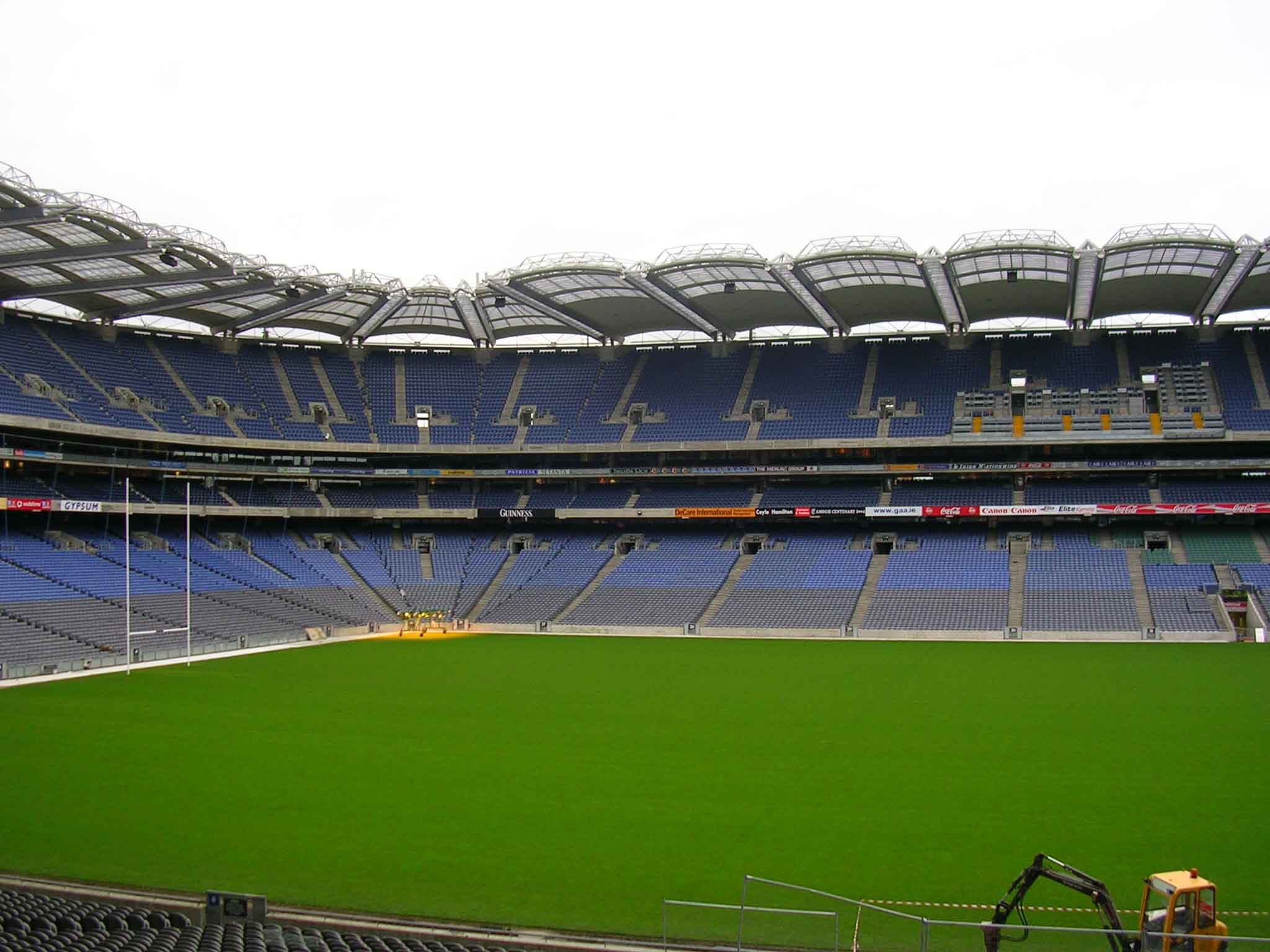
Croke Park, the venue for the 2013 final

=== Build-up ===
In Ennis a big screen was erected at Abbey Street car park in the town centre to screen live coverage of the final. Bookmakers made Cork slight favorites to win at 5/6 with Clare at 6/5. Before the 2013 Munster championship started Cork were priced at 16/1, and Clare at 22/1 to win the All-Ireland Final.

=== Hurling Stars of the 1980s Team ===
The GAA announced on 26 August that a special Hurling Stars of the 1980s team, a specially-chosen line-up of players who were unsuccessful in winning an All-Ireland medal would be acknowledged on finals day before the senior final. The names of the players were put forward by a panel of All-Star and former All-Star selectors who covered Gaelic games for the print and broadcast media during the 1980s.

=== Referee ===
Offaly based referee Brian Gavin was named as the referee for the 2013 All-Ireland final on 26 August. The Clara native took charge of his second final after having previously taken charge of the 2011 Final, and also the All-Ireland championship final at minor level in 2004 and under-21 level in 2006.

=== Team news ===
Cork made one change to the team that played in the semi-final against Dublin with Brian Murphy returning from injury and being named in the wing-back position, with Tom Kenny being omitted. Murphy had been out of action since June when he suffered a collarbone injury in a club match. Clare stated the game with the same fifteen which started the semi-final win over Limerick.

== Match details - Drawn game ==
=== Summary ===
Clare got the opening score of the third minute with a point from Darach Honan. and were ahead by 0–12 to 0–10 at half time. After 40 minutes Conor Lehane scored the opening goal of the game with a shot past the goalkeeper from the right and into the net to make the score 1–10 to 0–14. Cork got a second goal in the 57th minute when goalkeeper Anthony Nash hit a 20-yard free to the net after Luke O'Farrell had been fouled. With seven minutes left on the clock, Cork captain Patrick Cronin hit a shot to the top left corner of the net to level the game. Patrick Horgan looked to have won it for Cork with a point in the last minute. Added on time of two minutes was already up when Clare right-back Domhnall O'Donovan received the ball out on the left before hitting the ball over the bar just as he was tackled to tie up the match. The referee blew the final whistle after 2 minutes and 38 seconds to bring the match to a replay three weeks later.

8 September 2013
15:30
Final

Clare	0-25 - 3-16	Cork
D O'Donovan (0-01), Conor Ryan (0-01), J Conlon (0-02), T Kelly (0-03), Colin Ryan (0-12, 11f), P Collins (0-03), D Honan (0-01), C McGrath (0-02).	Report	A Nash (1-00, f), B Murphy (0-01), D Kearney (0-02), S Harnedy (0-02), P Cronin (1-00), C Lehane (1-01), P Horgan (0-10, 8f)

Croke Park
Attendance: 81,651
Referee: Brian Gavin (Offaly)

CLARE GAA:
1	Patrick Kelly
2	Domhnall O'Donovan
3	David McInerney
4	Cian Dillon
5	Brendan Bugler
6	Patrick Donnellan (c)
7	Patrick O'Connor
8	Colm Galvin
9	Conor Ryan
10	John Conlon
11	Tony Kelly
12	Colin Ryan
13	Podge Collins
14	Darach Honan
15	Conor McGrath
Substitutes used:
23	Cathal McInerney for D. Honan
21	Fergal Lynch for J. Conlon
20	Nicky O'Connell for C. McGrath
Manager:
Davy Fitzgerald

Cork GAA:
1	Anthony Nash
2	Stephen McDonnell
3	Shane O'Neill
4	Conor O'Sullivan
5	Brian Murphy
6	Christopher Joyce
7	William Egan
8	Lorcán McLoughlin
9	Daniel Kearney
10	Séamus Harnedy
11	Pa Cronin (c)
12	Conor Lehane
13	Luke O'Farrell
14	Patrick Horgan
15	Jamie Coughlan
Substitutes used:
24	Stephen Moylan for J. Coughlan
22	Cian McCarthy for L. McLoughlin
23	Cathal Naughton for C. McCarthy
20	Stephen White for D. Kearney
Manager:
Jimmy Barry-Murphy

== Reaction ==
Clare captain Pat Donnellan said that he was "delighted to have another day out, With ten or 15 seconds to go, we thought we were coming home with nothing. We're just delighted to have another day out and we'll look forward to it."

Highlights of the final were shown on The Sunday Game programme which aired at 9:30pm that night on RTÉ Two and was presented by Des Cahill with analysis from Donal Óg Cusack, Ger Loughnane, and Ollie Moran. Also in that programme, Cork manager Jimmy Barry-Murphy and captain Pa Cronin were interviewed by Michael Lyster from the Cork team hotel, the DT hotel in Dublin. Marty Morrissey who was at the Clare team hotel, the Clyde Court Hotel, interviewed Clare manager Davy Fitzgerald and captain Pat Donnellan.

== Pre-match - Replay ==
=== Build-up ===
The replay match was fixed for Saturday 28th rather than a traditional Sunday because the ladies Gaelic football finals are scheduled for the following Sunday, the 29th and are not going to be moved to another date which happened in 2012. The GAA have predicted that the replay will be a sell-out even with the 5pm throw-in time and it will be the first senior final to be played under floodlights. The GAA confirmed that there will be ticket reductions for the replay similar to the 2012 replay with stand tickets priced at €50 (down from €80) and terrace tickets at €25 (down from €40).

Cork manager Jimmy Barry-Murphy commented on the replay saying “It’s more of a game now than it is a final." The replay will be the sixth time that the sides have played each other in 2013. Clare selector Louis Mulqueen thinks that if Clare seize moment in the replay they can kickstart a golden era for the county saying "I still think if they could win the All-Ireland on Saturday we'd be talking about the golden era. But they still have to make the breakthrough and the quicker they make that breakthrough the better." Clare manager Davy Fitzgerald is concerned about the number of games the team has played in 2013 saying ""Since the start of February we've been flat out because we played the league campaign at a championship pace, So, I'd be saying to myself: 'Will these games catch up on them?' That's the only concern, but it doesn't seem to have. They seem to be good. I think the only really flat game we had was that Tipperary league game."

=== Referee ===
James McGrath was named as the referee for the replay on 18 September. It will be McGrath's second final after he was in charge of the 2012 Replay final between Kilkenny and Galway.

=== Team news ===
The Cork team for the replay was named on 25 September with Cian McCarthy being named in place of Jamie Coughlan in the half forward line. Clare named an unchanged team for the replay and also for the third game in succession. There had been speculation that Darach Honan could be replaced before throw-in after he failed to make an impact in the drawn game. A couple of hours before the start of the match, Shane O'Donnell was told that he would be starting the match in place of Darach Honan.

== Match details - Replay ==
=== Summary ===
John Conlon got the opening score of the game, a point in the second minute. A hat-trick of goals in the 6th, 14th and 19th minutes at the hill 16 end from late call-up Shane O'Donnell put Clare on the way to a four-point lead of 3–9 to 1–11 at half time. Anthony Nash had blasted a 20-metre free past 12 Clare players on the line for a goal that brought Cork back to within three points in the 16th minute. Clare then led by eight points but Cork had drawn level, 1–16 to 3–10, by the 52nd minute. With 18 minutes left the scores were level at 1–16 to 3-10 and they were level again with ten minutes left when Séamus Harnedy scored with a low shot to the net to make the score 2–16 to 3–13. In the 61st minute, Clare's Conor McGrath ran at goals and fired the ball high to the left corner of the net for Clare's fourth goal. Darach Honan, who came on as a second-half substitute, got Clare's fifth goal in the 71st minute after he received the ball on the right and managed to get as far as the Cork goals before pushing the ball past the goalkeeper with the ball rolling over the line.

28 September 2013
17:00
Final Replay

Clare	5-16 - 3-16	Cork
J Conlon (0-02), T Kelly (0-03), Colin Ryan (0-07f), S O’Donnell (3-03), D Honan (1-00), C McGrath (1-01).	Report	A Nash (1-00, f), L McLoughlin (0-01), S Harnedy (1-02), P Cronin (0-01), C Lehane (0-02), P Horgan (0-09, 7f), S Moylan (1-01)

Croke Park
Attendance: 82,276
Referee: James McGrath (Westmeath)

CLARE GAA:
1	Patrick Kelly
2	Domhnall O'Donovan
3	David McInerney
4	Cian Dillon
5	Brendan Bugler
6	Patrick Donnellan (c)
7	Patrick O'Connor
8	Colm Galvin
9	Conor Ryan
10	John Conlon
11	Tony Kelly
12	Colin Ryan
13	Podge Collins
22	Shane O'Donnell
15	Conor McGrath
Substitutes used:
23	Cathal McInerney for C.Galvin (52 mins)
20	Nicky O'Connell for P.Collins (59 mins)
14	Darach Honan for S. O'Donnell (66 mins)
18	Séadna Morey for T. Kelly (71 mins)
Manager:
Davy Fitzgerald

Cork GAA:
1	Anthony Nash
2	Stephen McDonnell
3	Shane O'Neill
4	Conor O'Sullivan
5	Brian Murphy
6	Christopher Joyce
7	William Egan
8	Lorcán McLoughlin
9	Daniel Kearney
10	Séamus Harnedy
11	Cian McCarthy
12	Pa Cronin (c)
13	Luke O'Farrell
14	Patrick Horgan
15	Conor Lehane
Substitutes used:
20	Stephen White for W. Egan (23 mins)
24	Stephen Moylan for L O’Farrell (half time)
19	Tom Kenny for D. Kearney (39 mins)
23	Cathal Naughton for C. McCarthy (55 mins)
17	Kilian Murphy for S. McDonnell (67 mins)
Manager:
Jimmy Barry-Murphy

=== Trophy presentation ===
Clare captain Patrick Donnellan accepted the Liam MacCarthy Cup from GAA president Liam O'Neill in the Hogan Stand and gave a speech in which he thanked the Clare panel, selectors, and back room team for their work throughout the year. The Clare team then embarked on a lap of honor around Croke Park.

== Reaction ==
Clare manager Davy Fitzgerald felt Clare were the better team over the two games saying " In my opinion over the two days we were the better team, I think Cork are a fantastic hurling team, but I really believe that we were the better team over the two days, We’re 2013 All-Ireland champions and it feels so good. I’m so proud of them young boys. They did it and fair play to them.” Fitzgerald speaking the morning after the game said “I suppose it still has not sunk in, but it is one of immense satisfaction. I am still the same. I am still so thrilled for the lads." Fitzgerald also said that it hurt that people did not trust him saying "My one objective was for Clare to win. I wasn't trying to do anything else, only to try and make sure Clare would win. It does hurt when people would cut your throat and knife you in the back. It isn't nice." Seven members of Clare's All-Ireland winning side were picked in The Sunday Game hurling team of the year. Man of the match Shane O'Donnell who got 3-3 said the county's win means “absolutely everything” revealing that he did not know he was starting until hours before the game. O'Donnell was named by The Sunday Game as the man of the match for the replay on the night of the match. At the teams celebration banquet at the Clyde Court Hotel in Dublin, he received his award from GAA President Liam O'Neill and Michael Lyster. Cork manager Jimmy Barry-Murphy acknowledged Clare's win saying "There is no disgrace in getting beaten by a team like Clare, you have to acknowledge they deserved their victory". Former Waterford hurler, John Mullane writing in the Irish Independent praised Clare manager Davy Fitzgerald and said "starting with Shane O'Donnell was a masterstroke". Jamesie O'Connor also writing in the Irish Independent believes that Clare have reached the summit earlier than expected saying "With the way Clare finished the year I think the consensus now is that the best team in the country came out on top, it's hard to believe that the hurling year gave us what it did, especially with the old order contesting the league final back in April. They will be back in 2014 but on a far more level playing pitch. Roll on 2014."

Former Offaly All Ireland winner and hurling analyst Daithí Regan thinks that the Clare system was the key as best team of the summer won out, saying "The big question now is, how many can Clare win with this crop of young lads. I was talking to Jamesie O’Connor after the game about what we can expect from this side over the next few years. He made the point that it’s a high-octane, high-energy game that Clare play. And it takes its toll and makes demands on players. But they’re at such an age profile at the moment that they’ll want more. When the celebrations die down, they’ll go back at it and you know I think because of their age profile they’ll be hungry and burnout won’t be an issue." Double All Ireland winning manager Ger Loughnane is confident that this is the start of a golden era for hurling in Clare, saying "“This has been a magical year – the best year I can remember for hurling, but you know we have the prospect that next year and the year after will be even better." British newspaper The Guardian in its editorial section, hailed the 'ancient Irish' game of hurling as a beacon of sporting courage and commitment, Hopefully the Gaelic Athletic Association will do all sports fans everywhere a massive favour and produce DVD copies of this memorable game, where Clare emerged victorious."

In 2017, after three years of under-performing, former Clare manager Ger Loughnane criticized the team that won the title saying "it was the greatest fluke of all time, they didn't beat either Tipperary or Kilkenny - the Litmus test in this era, until they show consistency and beat a big team in a big game, you'd have to say that this Clare team are over-rated.

== Homecoming ==
The Clare team arrived back in Ennis at 9.30pm on the day after the game on an open top bus. The team traveled by train from Heuston Station in Dublin to Limerick and then by bus to Ennis. En route they stopped at Cratloe, Sixmilebridge, Newmarket on Fergus, and Clarecastle. There was a reception held at Tim Smyth Park in Ennis which was attended by 30,000 people. Both sets of players, the senior panel and the under 21 winning panel were introduced on stage by MC's Syl O'Connor of Clare FM and RTÉ's Marty Morrissey. On 2 October, a Clare 'A' team played a Clare 'B' team in the annual GOAL challenge which was played in Sixmilebridge. The match was a 13 a side game with the 'A' team winning by 7–3 to 6–4. A crowd of 6,000 fans attended the match where Shane O’Donnell required a Garda escort to get him to the team bus after the game. On 4 October, Clare manager Davy Fitzgerald along with players Shane O'Donnell and Patrick Donnellan and the Liam MacCarthy Cup appeared as guests on The Late Late Show.

== Awards ==
The nominations for the 2013 GAA-GPA Hurling All-Stars were announced on 2 October with Clare receiving thirteen nominations with Cork receiving nine. Cian Dillon and Patrick O’Connor were the only Clare players not nominated. The final team selection was made on 6 November before the team were presented with their awards two days later at a banquet at Croke Park. Clare's won eight places on the All-Stars team with David McInerney, Brendan Bugler, Pat Donnellan, Colm Galvin, Conor Ryan, Tony Kelly, Pádraic Collins and Conor McGrath all winning awards. Cork won three awards with Anthony Nash, Séamus Harnedy and Patrick Horgan being named on the team. The three nominations for the GPA Hurler of the Year were Tony Kelly and Pádraic Collins of Clare, and Anthony Nash of Cork. Also announced were the three nominations for the GPA Young Hurler of the Year which were Tony Kelly, Pádraic Collins, and David McInerney from Clare.

Tony Kelly of Clare was named Young Hurler of the Year and Hurler of the Year for 2013 at the All Stars award ceremony on 8 November at Croke Park.
