= The Late Late Show season 52 =

Season of television series

The 52nd season of The Late Late Show, the world's longest-running chat show, began on 6 September 2013 and concluded on 30 May 2014. Ryan Tubridy's fifth season as host, it aired on RTÉ One each Friday evening from 21:30.

Local guests this season included Senator David Norris, Ombudsman Emily O'Reilly, John Wilson, Pádraig Harrington, Seán Óg Ó hAilpín, Joanne O'Riordan, Colin Farrell, Conor Lenihan, Lucinda Creighton, Mary Lou McDonald, Bob Geldof, Bosco, Brenda Fricker and Matt Cooper upon his return from North Korea. Brendan Gleeson and his sons Brian and Domhnall were all interviewed separately in different episodes (alongside the cast and crew of their latest projects) during March and April. Domhnall Gleeson also appeared alone in the season's opening episode in September.

Former Ireland rugby boss Warren Gatland was interviewed in October, while two of his successors, Joe Schmidt and Eddie O'Sullivan, were interviewed during consecutive episodes in January. Brian O'Driscoll and wife Amy Huberman featured in separate episodes (in October and in March) and Gordon D'Arcy and wife Aoife Cogan were interviewed together in May. International guests interviewed this season included astronaut Chris Hadfield, world chess champion Garry Kasparov, Sweden's Kevin Walker, South Africa's Francois Pienaar, KITT from Knight Rider, the cast of Anchorman and Richard Dreyfuss and Terry Gilliam (together) and Jonah Hill and Channing Tatum (together).

Musical guests this season included Wet Wet Wet, Cliff Richard, Midge Ure, Lang Lang, José Carreras, Clannad, Aslan, Something Happens, Delorentos, Villagers, Imelda May, O.R.B., Bell X1, Kodaline, Pixie Lott, Paolo Nutini and The Strypes.

== Second episode ==
On 13 September 2013, Majella O'Donnell, the wife of singer Daniel O'Donnell, shaved off her hair on the show in aid of the Irish Cancer Society following her diagnosis with breast cancer. €400,000 was raised for charity as a result.

== Fifth episode ==
=== Clare hurling team interview ===
On 4 October 2013, Clare hurling manager Davy Fitzgerald, along with players Shane O'Donnell and Patrick Donnellan, appeared as guests on the show to discuss the All-Ireland hurling final win and reaction. Davy Fitzgerald returned to the show in January.

=== Dolores O'Riordan revelation ===
Dolores O'Riordan confirmed she would be the new judge on The Voice of Ireland.

=== Sinéad O'Connor incident ===
Sinéad O'Connor used her appearance this season to discuss her feud with Miley Cyrus.

== Fifteenth episode ==
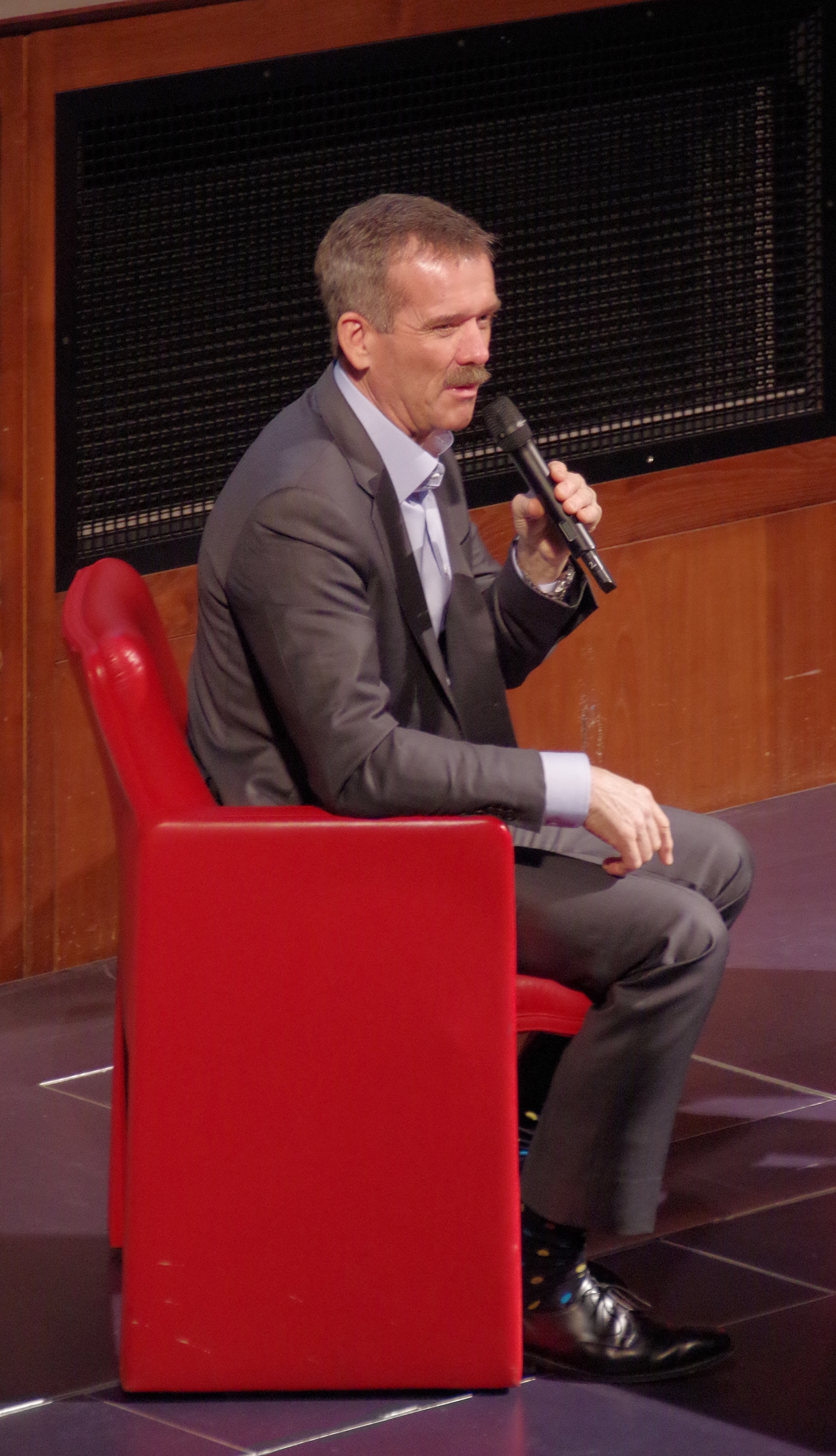
Chris Hadfield

On 13 December 2013, astronaut Chris Hadfield, in Ireland for a book signing the next day, was a guest. He performed his version of "Space Oddity". Such was his popularity, he returned as a guest two episodes later. Some reports suggested he was "the real star" of an episode that also featured the cast of Anchorman (though that sequence was pre-recorded).

== Special editions ==
The season's edition of The Late Late Toy Show was broadcast on 29 November 2013. The show had a Mary Poppins theme, with Ryan Tubridy opening the show dressed as chimney sweep Bert and then tearing off his costume to reveal his Christmas jumper. Guests included Robbie Keane and Bosco.

The 2014 Eurosong Final was held on The Late Late Show on 28 February. The show descended into chaos as Tubridy lost control of his guests and one of the judges, Linda Martin, confronted one of the mentors, Billy McGuinness, live on national television, at one point rising from her seat and shouting that he was an "odious little man". Meanwhile, five acts performed, with one selected to represent Ireland at Eurovision Song Contest 2014 in Copenhagen. The winner of the national song contest was [...] with the song "[...]". But Martin v McGuinness grabbed all the headlines.

== Episode list ==
No.	Original release date	Guest(s)	Musical/entertainment guest(s)
1	6 September 2013	Bob Geldof	The Boomtown Rats
Geldof also performed with The Boomtown Rats
2	13 September 2013	Lucinda Creighton	Clannad
3	20 September 2013	Sinitta	The High Kings
4	27 September 2013	Joanne O'Riordan	Bell X1
5	4 October 2012	Davy Fitzgerald, Shane O'Donnell and Patrick Donnellan	Nathan Carter
6	11 October 2013	Melanie McCabe	CÓRus
7	18 October 2013	Colin Farrell	Big September
8	25 October 2013	Kimberley Walsh	Jack L
9	1 November 2013	Shane Filan	Shane Filan
10	8 November 2013	Amanda Holden, John Delaney, Conor McGregor	Little Green Cars
11	15 November 2013	June Brown	Cliff Richard
12	22 November 2013	Finbar Furey, Helen Fielding, AP McCoy, Pat Shortt	Finbar Furey, Kodaline, Wet Wet Wet
13	29 November 2013	Various children	TBA
The Late Late Toy Show
14	6 December 2013	Gary Barlow	Gary Barlow, Shayne Ward with Foster and Allen
15	13 December 2013	Will Ferrell, Steve Carell, Paul Rudd and David Koechner	Chris Hadfield
Interview with Ferrell, Carell, Rudd and Koechner pre-recorded earlier in the week during their visit for the European premiere of Anchorman 2: The Legend Continues
16	20 December 2013	Una Healy	Wallis Bird and Sharon Shannon duet
Two families were also reunited for Christmas
17	10 January 2014	Kian Egan	Gregory Porter
18	17 January 2014	Davy Fitzgerald	James Vincent McMorrow
19	24 January 2014	Josh Hartnett	Michael Bolton
20	31 January 2014	Keith Barry	Mario Rosenstock's Garth Brooks mania sketch
21	7 February 2014	David Norris	Eddi Reader
22	14 February 2014	David Rawle	Robert Mizzell
23	21 February 2014	Richard Dreyfuss and Terry Gilliam	Corner Boy, Midge Ure, Keith Hanley
24	28 February 2014	Louis Walsh, Linda Martin, Eoghan McDermott, Maia Dunphy, Johnny Logan	Johnny Logan
Eurosong special
25	7 March 2014	Amy Huberman, Hugh O'Conor, Peter McDonald and Brian Gleeson	Judith Owen
26	14 March 2014	The family of the late Christine Buckley	Kian Egan
27	21 March 2014	Mike Ross	Raglans
28	28 March 2014	Brendan Gleeson, Killian Scott and John Michael McDonagh	Pixie Lott, The Riptide Movement, The Wolfe Tones
29	4 April 2014	Garda whistleblower John Wilson	Some of those interviewed?
30	11 April 2014	Linda Nolan	Hothouse Flowers
Magee also performed charity single "These Old Eyes Have Seen It All"
31	18 April 2014	Cathy Kelly	Lang Lang
32	25 April 2014	Michelle Heaton (on her health scares)	Something Happens
33	2 May 2014	Christy Moore	300-person Riverdance performance
34	9 May 2014	Aengus Mac Grianna	Derek Ryan with Sharon Shannon, Mick Flannery
35	16 May 2014	Des Bishop	Emma Stevens
36	23 May 2014	Jonah Hill and Channing Tatum	Aslan
37	30 May 2014	Conor McGregor	HomeTown
