= Daniel Kearney =

Irish hurler (born 1989)

Personal information
- Native name: Dónall Ó Cearnaigh (Irish)
- Born: 19 December 1989 (age 36) Glanmire, County Cork, Ireland
- Occupation: Senior Associate at PwC
- Height: 5 ft 8 in (173 cm)

Sport
- Sport: Hurling
- Position: Right wing-forward
Club*
Years	Club	Apps (scores)
2007-present	Sarsfields	65 (4-92)
Club titles
- Cork titles: 4
College
- Years: College
- 2007-2014: University College Cork
College titles
- Fitzgibbon titles: 1
Inter-county**
Years	County	Apps (scores)
2012-2020	Cork	35 (1-36)
Inter-county titles
- Munster titles: 3
- All-Irelands: 0
- NHL: 0
- All Stars: 0
- * club appearances and scores correct as of 01:58, 9 July 2018. **Inter County team apps and scores correct as of 14:01, 22 September 2019.

Daniel Kearney (born 19 December 1989) is an Irish hurler who plays for Cork Championship club Sarsfields. He was a member of the Cork senior hurling team for eight seasons, during which time he usually lined out as a right wing-forward.

== Early life ==
Kearney was born in Glanmire, County Cork. His twin brother, William Kearney, also played for Cork.

== Playing career ==
=== Glanmire Community College ===
Kearney first came to prominence as a hurler with Glanmire Community College in Rochestown. Having played at every grade, he was a forward on the college's senior teams that played in the Harty Cup.

=== University College Cork ===
During his studies at University College Cork, Kearney established himself as a forward on the senior hurling team. On 3 March 2012, he was a non-playing substitute when UCC defeated Cork Institute of Technology by 2–15 to 2–14 to win the Fitzgibbon Cup.

=== Sarsfields ===
Kearney joined the Sarsfields club at a young age and played in all grades at juvenile and underage levels, enjoying championship success as captain of the minor team in 2007. That same year he made his senior championship debut at left corner-forward in a 0–13 to 0–12 defeat of Blackrock on 13 May 2007.

On 28 September 2008, Kearney lined out at right wing-back in his first senior championship final. He scored one point from play in a 2–14 to 2–13 defeat of Bride Rovers to claim his first championship medal.

After losing the 2009 final to Newrtownshandrum, Sarsfields were back in a third successive decider on 10 October 2010. Kearney once again scored a point in the 1–17 to 0–18 defeat of Glen Rovers.

On 7 October 2012, Sarsfields lined out in their fourth championship final in five seasons. After trailing Bishopstown in the second half, Kearney scored the equalising point in the 41st minute before Sarsfields went on to win by 1–15 to 1–14.

Sarsfields failed to retain the title in 2012 after suffering a two-point defeat by Midleton, however, Kearney played in his sixth final in seven seasons on 12 October 2014. Lining out at midfield, he came in for praise for linking defence and attack and scored a point in the 2–18 to 0–08 defeat of Glen Rovers.

=== Cork ===
==== Under-21 ====
Kearney never played minor hurling for Cork, however, he was subsequently added to the Cork under-21 team, making his debut on 2 June 2010 in a Munster Championship quarter-final defeat of Waterford.

==== Senior ====
Kearney made his senior debut for Cork on 24 June 2012, replacing Darren Sweetnam in the 50th minute of a Munster Championship quarter-final defeat by Tipperary at Páirc Uí Chaoimh. He established himself as a first-team player team the following season. On 14 July 2013 Kearney lined out in his first Munster final, however, Cork faced a 0–24 to 0–15 defeat by Limerick. On 8 September 2013, Kearney lined out against Clare in the All-Ireland final. Three second-half goals through Conor Lehane, Anthony Nash and Pa Cronin, and a tenth point of the game from Patrick Horgan gave Cork a one-point lead as injury time came to an end. A last-minute point from corner-back Domhnall O'Donovan earned Clare a 0–25 to 3–16 draw. The replay on 28 September was regarded as one of the best in recent years. Clare's Shane O'Donnell was a late addition to the team, and went on to score a hat-trick of goals in the first nineteen minutes of the game. Patrick Horgan top scored for Cork, however, further goals from Conor McGrath and Darach Honan secured a 5–16 to 3–16 victory for Clare.

On 13 July 2014, Kearney won his first Munster medal after a six-point defeat of Limerick in the final.

After being substituted in the 32nd minute of the Munster Championship quarter-final defeat by Tipperary on 22 May 2016, there were reports that Kearney left the panel. He was later forced to issue a statement on Twitter denying the rumours.

After taking some time out to recuperate from an injury at the start of the 2017 season, Kearney subsequently returned to the panel for the National League. On 9 July 2017, he won his second Munster medal following a 1–25 to 1–20 defeat of Clare in the final.

On 1 July 2018, Kearney won a third Munster medal following a 2–24 to 3–19 defeat of Clare in the final. He ended the season by being nominated for an All-Star Award.

On 20 January 2020, it was confirmed that Kearney had left the Cork senior team.

=== Munster ===
On 9 February 2014, Kearney played at right win-forward on the Munster team that was defeated by Connacht in the Interprovincial Championship semi-final.

== Career statistics ==
=== Club ===
As of match played 21 September 2019.

Team	Season	Cork		Munster		All-Ireland		Total	
Team	Season	Apps	Score	Apps	Score	Apps	Score	Apps	Score
Sarsfields	2007-08	2	0-02	—		—		2	0-02
Sarsfields	2008-09	5	0-02	1	0-01	—		6	0-03
Sarsfields	2009-10	5	0-01	—		—		5	0-01
Sarsfields	2010-11	6	0-05	1	0-03	—		7	0-08
Sarsfields	2011-12	3	0-02	—		—		3	0-02
Sarsfields	2012-13	5	0-05	1	0-00	—		6	0-05
Sarsfields	2013-14	6	0-11	—		—		6	0-11
Sarsfields	2014-15	6	0-08	1	0-03	—		7	0-11
Sarsfields	2015-16	7	0-09	—		—		7	0-09
Sarsfields	2016-17	4	3-09	—		—		4	3-09
Sarsfields	2017-18	6	0-13	—		—		6	0-13
Sarsfields	2018-19	3	1-12	—		—		3	1-12
Sarsfields	2019-20	3	0-06	—		—		3	0-06
Total		61	4-85	4	0-07	—		65	4-92

=== Inter-county ===
Team	Year	National League			Munster		All-Ireland		Total	
Team	Year	Division	Apps	Score	Apps	Score	Apps	Score	Apps	Score
Cork	2012	Division 1A	0	0-00	1	0-01	3	0-01	4	0-02
Cork	2013	Division 1A	5	0-06	2	0-02	3	0-03	10	0-11
Cork	2014	Division 1B	6	0-04	4	0-05	1	0-00	11	0-09
Cork	2015	Division 1A	8	0-07	1	0-01	3	0-02	12	0-10
Cork	2016	Division 1A	6	0-04	1	0-00	2	1-02	9	1-06
Cork	2017	Division 1A	4	0-02	2	0-00	1	0-00	7	0-02
Cork	2018	Division 1A	5	0-04	5	0-10	1	0-03	11	0-17
Cork	2019	Division 1A	4	0-04	4	0-06	1	0-00	9	0-10
Career total			38	0-31	20	0-25	15	1-11	73	1-64

=== Inter-provincial ===
As of match played 9 February 2014.

Team	Season	Railway Cup	
Team	Season	Apps	Score
Munster	2014	1	0-02
Total		1	0-02

== Honours ==
University College Cork

- Fitzgibbon Cup (1): 2012

Sarsfields

- Cork Senior Hurling Championship (4): 2008, 2010, 2012, 2014
- Cork Minor Hurling Championship (1): 2007 (c)

Cork

- Munster Senior Hurling Championship (3): 2014, 2017, 2018
