= Fergal Lynch =

Irish hurler

Personal information
- Native name: Fergal Ó Loingsigh (Irish)
- Born: 26 October 1982 (age 44) Quin, County Clare, Ireland
- Occupation: Primary School Principal
- Height: 6 ft 3 in (191 cm)

Sport
- Sport: Hurling
- Position: Left wing-forward
Club
- Years: Club
- Clooney-Quin
Inter-county*
Years	County	Apps (scores)
2002-2013	Clare	24 (0-8)
Inter-county titles
- Munster titles: 0
- All-Irelands: 1
- NHL: 0
- All Stars: 0
- *Inter County team apps and scores correct as of 18:51, 4 October 2013.

Fergal Lynch (born 26 October 1982) is an Irish hurler who played as a left wing-forward for the Clare senior team. Lynch attended NUI Galway.

Born in Quin, County Clare, Lynch first arrived on the inter-county scene playing at under-age level for Clare. He made his senior debut in the 2002 National Hurling League. Lynch went on to play a key part for Clare and won one All-Ireland medal.

At club level Lynch is a Munster medallist in the intermediate grade with Clooney-Quin. He has also won one intermediate championship medal in Clare.

Throughout his career Lynch made 24 championship appearances. His retirement came following the conclusion of the 2013 championship.

He will be part of the Clare Hurling back-room team for 2014 as a forwards coach.

== Playing career ==
=== Club ===
Lynch started playing with Clooney-Quin's top team as a sixteen-year-old in 1999, however, it was 2006 before he enjoyed his first major success. On 22 October that year he won an intermediate championship medal following a two-point win over Killanena. Clooney-Quin subsequently represented Clare in the provincial club championship, eventually facing Bishopstown in the Munster decider. After twenty minutes Bishopstown led by four points; three minutes into the second-half they had stretched that to six and were hurling with supreme confidence. But they were made pay for twelve wides while their opponents were much more ruthless in front of the posts. A 0–14 to 1–8 victory gave Lynch a Munster medal.

=== Inter-county ===
Lynch made his senior debut with Clare during the 2002 National Hurling League. He remained on and off the team for a number of years, before making his championship debut in an All-Ireland semi-final defeat by Cork on 14 August 2005.

On 13 July 2008 Lynch lined out in his first Munster final, when he came on as a substitute for Declan O'Rourke against Tipperary. Clare were punished for a sluggish first half on that occasion, and were eventually defeated by 2–21 to 0–19.

On 8 September 2013 Lynch lined out against Cork in his first All-Ireland final when he was introduced as a late substitute once again. Three second-half goals through Conor Lehane, Anthony Nash and Pa Cronin, and a tenth point of the game from Patrick Horgan gave Cork a one-point lead as injury time came to an end. A last-gasp point from corner-back Domhnall O'Donovan earned Clare a 0–25 to 3–16 draw. The replay on 28 September was regarded as one of the best in recent years. Clare's Shane O'Donnell, who Lynch replaced as a brief blood sub, was a late addition to the team, and went on to score a hat-trick of goals in the first nineteen minutes of the game. Patrick Horgan top scored for Cork again, however, further goals from Conor McGrath and Darach Honan secured a 5–16 to 3–16 victory for Clare.

== Honours ==
Cratloe

- Clare Senior Football Championship (1) : 2013

Clooney-Quin

- Munster Intermediate Club Hurling Championship (1): 2006
- Clare Intermediate Hurling Championship (1): 2006

Clare

- All-Ireland Senior Hurling Championship (1): 2013
