= Brian Murphy (hurler, born 1982) =

Irish hurler

Personal information
- Native name: Briain Ó Murchú (Irish)
- Born: 21 July 1982 (age 44) Rathcormac, County Cork, Ireland
- Occupation: Gaelic games development administrator
- Height: 5 ft 11 in (180 cm)

Sport
- Sport: Hurling
- Position: Full-back
Club
- Years: Club
- 1999-2021: Bride Rovers
Club titles
- Cork titles: 0
Inter-county*
Years	County	Apps (scores)
2003–present	Cork	46 (0–2)
Inter-county titles
- Munster titles: 2
- All-Irelands: 2
- NHL: 0
- All Stars: 1
- *Inter County team apps and scores correct as of 19:05, 12 March 2014.

Brian Murphy (born 21 July 1982) is an Irish hurler who plays as a full-back for the Cork senior team.

Born in Rathcormac, County Cork, Murphy first played competitive hurling whilst at school in St. Colman's College. He arrived on the inter-county scene at the age of seventeen when he first linked up with the Cork minor team, before later lining out with the under-21 and intermediate sides. He made his senior debut in the 2003 National Hurling League. Murphy went on to play a key part for Cork during a successful period for the team, and has won two All-Ireland medals and two Munster medals. Murphy was an All-Ireland runner-up on two occasions.

At club level Murphy has won a set of Munster and championship medals with Bride Rovers in the intermediate grade.

Regarded as one of the key members of the Cork defence for over a decade, Murphy has won one All-Star award while he also won the All Stars Young Hurler of the Year award in his debut season.

Throughout his career Murphy made 46 championship appearances for Cork. He announced his retirement from inter-county hurling on 11 March 2014. On 26 May 2015 Murphy announced his return to the Cork senior panel.

== Playing career ==
=== College ===
During his secondary schooling at St. Colman's College, Fermoy, Murphy enjoyed much success on the hurling fields.

In 2001 he won a Harty Cup medal following a defeat of St. Flannan's College, Ennis. The subsequent All-Ireland decider saw Gort Community School providing the opposition. A narrow 2–10 to 2–7 victory gave Murphy an All-Ireland medal.

=== University ===
As a member of the Cork Institute of Technology senior hurling team, Murphy lined out in the final of the Fitzgibbon Cup on 1 March 2003. Waterford Institute of Technology provided the opposition and claimed a comprehensive 0–13 to 0–7 defeat of Murphy's side.

=== Club ===
Murphy plays his club hurling and Gaelic football with Bride Rovers and has enjoyed much success.

In 2003 he lined out in the final of the intermediate championship. Inniscarra provided the opposition and, despite being held on a tight rein in the opening quarter, Bride Rovers powered to the front with a goal in the seventeenth minute and never looked back. A 1–15 to 1–5 victory gave Murphy a championship medal. Bride Rovers later represented Cork in the provincial series of games and even reached the final against Kilruane MacDonagh's of Tipperary. A strong wind made conditions very difficult, however, Bride Rovers triumphed by 0–14 to 0–11 giving Murphy a Munster medal.

On 28 September 2008 Murphy played in the final of the senior championship as Bride Rovers reached the decider for the first time in their history. A goal by Robert O'Driscoll of Sarsfield's with seven minutes of normal time left proved the decisive score as Bride Rovers were narrowly defeated by 2–14 to 2–13.

=== Minor, under-21 and intermediate ===
Murphy first came to prominence on inter-county scene as a member of the Cork minor hurling team. He was an unused substitute during Cork's unsuccessful championship campaign in 1999.

On 10 May 2000 Murphy made his debut for the Cork minors at right corner-back in a 1–9 to 0–10 defeat of Clare. He later won a Munster medal following a 2–19 to 1–10 trouncing of Lmerick. Cork later qualified for the All-Ireland final with Galway providing the opposition. An exciting hour of hurling followed, however, Murphy's side were defeated by 2–19 to 4–10.

Murphy made his Cork under-21 debut on 9 July 2002, however, his two seasons with the team ended without success.

On 16 July 2003 Murphy was included on the Cork intermediate hurling team for the provincial decider against Waterford. On a rain-soaked evening, the Rebels regained the provincial crown and Murphy collected a Munster medal following a 2–12 to 0–11 victory. Murphy was at left corner-back for the subsequent All-Ireland final meeting with Kilkenny. An exciting game of hurling ensued, however, at the final whistle both sides were level. A period of extra-time finally produced a winner, as Cork secured a narrow 1–21 to 0–23 victory. The win gave Murphy an All-Ireland medal in that grade.

=== Senior ===
Murphy made his senior debut in a National Hurling League game against Waterford in 2003. He was later included on Cork's championship panel, and was a non-playing substitute as Cork defeated Waterford to take the Munster crown but eventually lost the All-Ireland to Kilkenny.

Murphy made his senior championship debut for Cork on 16 May 2004 in a Munster quarter-final defeat of Kerry. Cork later reached a Munster final showdown with Waterford. In what many consider to be the greatest provincial championship decider of them all, Cork narrowly lost on a 3–16 to 1–21 score line. The game was not without incident for Murphy, who was involved in an off-the-ball altercation which led to John Mullane's sending off. In spite of surrendering their provincial crown, Cork still reached the All-Ireland final via the back door. Kilkenny provided the opposition on a gloomy and overcast day, however, the game failed to live up to expectations. The sides were level for much of the game, and in the final twenty minutes Cork scored nine points without reply and secured a 0–17 to 0–9 victory. It was Murphy's first All-Ireland medal in the senior grade. He was subsequently presented with the Vodafone Young Hurler of the Year award.

Murphy won his first Munster medal on the field of play on 26 June 2005 when Tipperary were downed on a 1–21 to 1–16 score line. Subsequent defeats of Waterford and Clare set up an All-Ireland final meeting with Galway. Cork never surrendered their lead on the scoreboard after surging to an early lead and held Galway scoreless for the last ten minutes. A 1–21 to 1–16 victory gave Murphy his second All-Ireland medal.

2006 saw Cork turn their attentions to a first three-in-a-row of All-Ireland titles since 1978. For the second successive year, Tipperary provided the opposition in the provincial final. A 2–14 to 1–14 victory gave Murphy his second Munster medal. On 3 September 2006 he lined out in his third successive All-Ireland decider, with Kilkenny providing the opposition. Like previous encounters neither side took a considerable lead, however, Kilkenny had a vital goal from Aidan Fogarty. Cork were in arrears coming into the final few minutes, however, Ben O'Connor goaled for Cork. It was too little too late as the Cats denied the Rebels the three-in-a-row on a score line of 1–16 to 1–13. Murphy was later honoured with an All-Star award for his performances throughout the championship.

The following few seasons proved difficult for Cork, resulting in a strike by the players following Gerald McCarthy's reappointment as manager. After months of pressure McCarthy eventually stepped down as manager in March 2009 and Denis Walsh took over. Just over a month later on 15 April 2009 Murphy announced his shock retirement from inter-county hurling. While some had speculated that his decision was as a result of his opposition to the players' strike, Murphy was also known to have suffered from severe migraines which impacted on his playing.

Murphy later reversed his decision to retire and rejoined the county squad for training on 7 July 2009.

On 23 June 2013 Murphy captained Cork for the first time due to the absence of regular skipper Pa Cronin. The 0–23 to 0–15 defeat of Clare set up a Munster decider with Limerick, however, a shoulder injury in a club game a week later which looked to have brought an end to his season. Murphy recovered from injury and was named in the wing-back position on the starting Cork team to face Clare in the All-Ireland decider on 8 September. Three second-half goals through Conor Lehane, Anthony Nash and Pa Cronin, and a tenth point of the game from Patrick Horgan gave Cork a one-point lead as injury time came to an end. A last-gasp point from corner-back Domhnall O'Donovan earned Clare a 0–25 to 3–16 draw. The replay on 28 September was regarded as one of the best in recent years. Clare's Shane O'Donnell was a late addition to the team, and went on to score a hat-trick of goals in the first nineteen minutes of the game. Patrick Horgan top scored for Cork, however, further goals from Conor McGrath and Darach Honan secured a 5–16 to 3–16 victory for Clare.

== Personal life ==
Murphy completed a diploma in Business and Marketing at the Cork Institute of Technology and subsequently worked as a sales rep with Southern Business & Finance in Cork where his colleagues included former All-Ireland winners Jimmy Barry-Murphy and Dinny Allen.

In 2009 Murphy was appointed to the full-time position of Games Development Administrator with the Cork County Board.

== Honours ==
=== Playing honours ===
St. Colman's College

- All-Ireland Senior Colleges' Hurling Championship (1): 2001
- Harty Cup (1): 2001

Bride Rovers

- Munster Intermediate Club Hurling Championship (1): 2003
- Cork Intermediate Hurling Championship (1): 2003

Cork

- All-Ireland Senior Hurling Championship (2): 2004, 2005
- Munster Senior Hurling Championship (2): 2005, 2006
- All-Ireland Intermediate Hurling Championship (1): 2003
- Munster Intermediate Hurling Championship (1): 2003
- Munster Minor Hurling Championship (1): 2000

=== Personal honours ===
Awards

- Vodafone Young Hurler of the Year (1): 2004
- All-Stars (1): 2006

Achievements
Preceded by Setanta Ó hAilpín (Cork)	Vodafone Young Hurler of the Year; 2004	Succeeded by David Collins (Galway)
Sporting positions
Preceded by Patrick Horgan	Cork Senior Hurling Captain; 2013	Succeeded by Pa Cronin
