= Shane O'Neill (Cork hurler) =

Irish hurler (born 1986)

Personal information
- Native name: Seán Ó Néill (Irish)
- Born: 1 March 1986 (age 40) Bishopstown, Cork, Ireland
- Occupation: Advisory associate at PwC
- Height: 5 ft 11 in (180 cm)

Sport
- Sport: Hurling
- Position: Right corner-back
Club
- Years: Club
- 2004-present: Bishopstown
Club titles
- Cork titles: 0
Inter-county*
Years	County	Apps (scores)
2005-present	Cork	35 (0-1)
Inter-county titles
- Munster titles: 1
- All-Irelands: 0
- NHL: 0
- All Stars: 0
- *Inter County team apps and scores correct as of 15:43, 18 July 2014.

Shane O'Neill (born 1 March 1986) is an Irish hurler who plays as a right corner-back for the Cork senior team.

Born in Bishopstown, Cork, O'Neill first played competitive hurling whilst at school in Coláiste an Spioraid Naoimh. He arrived on the inter-county scene at the age of seventeen when he first linked up with the Cork minor team, before later joining the under-21 side. He joined the senior team as a member of the extended panel during the 2005 championship. Since then O'Neill has become a regular member of the starting fifteen and has won one Munster medal on the field of play. He has been an All-Ireland runner-up on one occasion.

As a member of the Munster inter-provincial team, O'Neill has won one Railway Cup medal. At club level he has won several championship medals in all grades with Bishopstown.

== Playing career ==
=== Club ===
O'Neill played with Bishopstown in a period when the club won back-to-back minor championship medals (in 2003 and 2004) and back-to-back under-21 championship medals (in 2006 and 2007).

In 2006 O'Neill was a member of the Bishopstown team that faced Carrigtwohill in the final of the premier intermediate championship. A 0–20 to 1–11 victory gave him a Cork Premier Intermediate Hurling Championship medal.

=== Inter-county ===
O'Neill first lined out with Cork in the minor grade in 2003. In the following season, 2004, he won his first Munster medal as Cork ended Tipperary's hopes of four-in-a-row with a 2–13 to 3–8 victory.

The following year O'Neill was a member of the Cork under-21 team. He won a Munster Under-21 Hurling Championship medal in his debut year, as Cork defeated Tipperary by 4–8 to 0–13.

Two years later and O'Neill was appointed captain of the Cork under-21 team. He won a second Munster medal on that occasion following a 1–20 to 0–10 win over Waterford.

By 2005 O'Neill's performances for the Cork minor and under-21 teams brought him to the attention of the senior selectors. He was a member of the extended panel during Cork's All-Ireland victory. He won a Munster medal in 2006 as an unused substitute.

On 17 June 2007 O'Neill made his senior championship debut in a 5–15 to 3-18 Munster semi-final defeat by Waterford. The following few seasons saw Cork go into decline. In 2011, O'Neill was appointed captain of the team.

O'Neill lined out in his second Munster decider in 2013, however, Cork faced a 0–24 to 0–15 defeat by Limerick. On 8 September 2013 he lined out against Clare in his first All-Ireland final. Three second-half goals through Conor Lehane, Anthony Nash and Pa Cronin, and a tenth point of the game from Patrick Horgan gave Cork a one-point lead as injury time came to an end. A last-gasp point from corner-back Domhnall O'Donovan earned Clare a 0–25 to 3–16 draw. The replay on 28 September saw Clare's Shane O'Donnell score a hat-trick of goals in the first nineteen minutes of the game. Patrick Horgan was top scorer for Cork, however, further goals from Conor McGrath and Darach Honan secured a 5–16 to 3–16 victory for Clare.

In 2014, O'Neill won his first Munster Senior Hurling Championship medal on the field of play as goals by Séamus Harnedy and Paudie O'Sullivan gave Cork a 2–24 to 0–24 victory over Limerick.

=== Inter-provincial ===
O'Neill was picked for Munster in the inter-provincial series of games. He won an Interprovincial Championship medal in 2013 as Munster defeated Connacht by 1–22 to 0–15.

== Honours ==
Bishopstown

- Cork Premier Intermediate Hurling Championship (1): 2006
- Cork Under-21 Hurling Championship (2): 2006, 2007
- Cork Minor Hurling Championship (2): 2003, 2004

Cork

- All-Ireland Senior Hurling Championship (1): 2005 (sub)
- Munster Senior Hurling Championship (2): 2006 (sub), 2014
- Munster Under-21 Hurling Championship (2): 2005, 2007
- Munster Minor Hurling Championship (1): 2004

Munster

- Railway Cup (1): 2013

Sporting positions
Preceded by Kieran Murphy	Cork Senior Hurling Captain; 2011	Succeeded by Donal Óg Cusack
