= Podge Collins =

Irish footballer & hurler (born 1992)

Personal information
- Native name: Pádraic Ó Coileáin (Irish)
- Nickname: Podge
- Born: 14 January 1992 (age 34) Caherdavin, Limerick, Ireland
- Occupation: Bank of Ireland employee
- Height: 4 ft 11 in (150 cm)

Sport
- Sport: Hurling
Club
- Years: Club
- 2009–: Cratloe
Club titles
	Football	Hurling
Clare titles	3	2
Inter-county*
Years	County	Apps (scores)
2012–2023	Clare	41 (0–18)
Inter-county titles
- Munster titles: 0
- All-Irelands: 1
- NHL: 1
- All Stars: 1
- *Inter County team apps and scores correct as of 20:56, 26 November 2013.

Pádraic "Podge" Collins (born 14 January 1992) is an Irish Gaelic footballer and hurler who plays as a right wing-forward for Cratloe and previously with the Clare senior team.

He arrived on the inter-county scene at the age of eighteen when he first linked up with the Clare minor team, before later lining out with the under-21 side. He made his senior debut in the 2012 championship. Collins has since gone on to play a key role for Clare, and has won one All-Ireland medal.

At club level Collins is a dual senior championship medallist with Cratloe.

== Early life ==
Born in Caherdavin, Limerick, Collins first played competitive hurling whilst at school in St. Caimin's C.S., Shannon.

His father, Colm, managed the Clare senior football team from 2013 onwards.

== Playing career ==
=== Minor and under-21 ===
Collins first came to prominence on the inter-county scene as a member of the Clare minor team in 2010. He won his first Munster medal that year following a 1–16 to 1–11 defeat of Waterford. Clare subsequently qualified for the All-Ireland decider against Kilkenny, however, Collins's side faced a narrow 2–10 to 0–14 defeat.

By 2012 Collins had joined the Clare under-21 team. He won a Munster medal in that grade as Clare defeated Tipperary by 1–16 to 1–14. Clare subsequently faced Kilkenny in the All-Ireland decider. After trailing at half-time, Clare outscored their opponents by 1–10 to 0–4 in the second period of play to secure a 2–17 to 2–11 victory. It was Collins's first All-Ireland medal in the grade.

Clare dominated the under-21 series once again in 2013. A 1–17 to 2–10 defeat of Tipperary in the provincial decider gave Collins a second Munster medal. The subsequent All-Ireland saw Clare face first-time finalists Antrim. In a complete mismatch, Clare powered to a 2–28 to 0–12 victory, with Collins collecting a second consecutive All-Ireland medal.

=== Senior ===
Collins made his senior championship debut at right wing-forward in a 2–17 to 1–18 defeat by Waterford on 17 June 2012.

On 8 September 2013, Collins lined out against Cork in his first All-Ireland final. Three second-half goals through Conor Lehane, Anthony Nash and Pa Cronin, and a tenth point of the game from Patrick Horgan gave Cork a one-point lead as injury time came to an end. A last-gasp point from corner-back Domhnall O'Donovan earned Clare a 0–25 to 3–16 draw. The replay on 28 September was regarded as one of the best in recent years. Clare's Shane O'Donnell was a late addition to the team, and went on to score a hat-trick of goals in the first nineteen minutes of the game. Horgan top scored for Cork, however, further goals from Conor McGrath and Darach Honan secured a 5–16 to 3–16 victory for Clare. It was Collins's first All-Ireland medal. He rounded off the season by collecting his first All-Star award, while he was also a nominee for Hurler of the Year.

In 2014 along with his brother Sean he joined up with the Clare senior football team who were managed by his father Colm. He played during their NFL Div 4 campaign, but missed out on the final. He then lined out in the Munster Senior Football Championship game with Waterford, he missed out on the replay due to hurling. He returned to the side for the Munster semi final where Clare went down by 4 points to Kerry. Clare then entered round 2 of the qualifiers where they faced Carlow. Collins scored a goal as his side ran out 4–26 to 2–13 winners. In the next round despite leading for long stages of the game Clare fell short by a point to Kildare.

At the end of the 2014 Collins along with his brother reported they would be committing to football only for the 2015 season. In October 2015, it was reported that Collins would again play with the Clare footballers and hurlers in 2016.

In December 2023, Collins announced his retirement from inter-county football.

== Honours ==
St. Aidan's National School

- Cumann na mBunscol, Division 1 (1) : 2004

Clare

- All-Ireland Senior Hurling Championship (1) : 2013
- All-Ireland Under-21 Hurling Championship (2) : 2012,2013
- Munster Under-21 Hurling Championship (2) : 2012, 2013
- Munster Minor Hurling Championship (1) : 2010
- National Hurling League Division 1 (1) : 2016
- Waterford Crystal Cup (1) : 2013
- Munster Senior Hurling League (1) : 2016

Cratloe

- Clare Senior Football Championship (3) : 2013, 2014, 2023
- Clare Intermediate Football Championship (1) : 2009
- Clare Senior Hurling Championship (2) : 2009, 2014
- Clare Under-21 Football Championship (2): 2009, 2011

Awards

- GAA-GPA All-Star Award (1): 2013
- The Sunday Game Player of the Year (1): 2013
