= William Egan (hurler) =

Irish hurler (born 1990)

Personal information
- Native name: Liam Mac Aogáin (Irish)
- Born: 16 June 1990 (age 36) Liscarroll, County Cork, Ireland
- Occupation: Corporate finance assistant
- Height: 1.71 m (5 ft 7 in)

Sport
- Sport: Hurling
- Position: Left wing-back
Clubs
- Years: Club
- Kilbrin; Duhallow
College(s)
- Years: College
- 2009-2013 2013-2014: University College Cork; University College Dublin
College titles
- Fitzgibbon titles: 2
Inter-county*
Years	County	Apps (scores)
2010-2016	Cork	22 (0-06)
Inter-county titles
- Munster titles: 1
- All-Irelands: 0
- NHL: 0
- All Stars: 0
- *Inter County team apps and scores correct as of 22:17, 14 January 2019.

William Egan (born 16 June 1990) is an Irish hurler who plays for Duhallow Junior Championship club Kilbrin. He currently plays as a centre-back, but can also be deployed as a wing-back. Egan is a former member of the Cork senior hurling team.

== Playing career ==
=== Club ===
Egan plays his club hurling and Gaelic football with Kilbrin and has enjoyed some success.

As a member of the club's hurling team he has won numerous junior championship and under-21 championship medals at divisional level.

In 2010 Egan won a junior "B" football championship medal with the club following a one-point defeat of Charleville.

=== University ===
During his tenure at University College Cork, Egan played a key role for the university's various hurling teams.

In 2010 he was at midfield when UCC faced fierce local rivals and three-in-a-row hopefuls Cork Institute of Technology in the final of the All-Ireland Freshers Championship. Egan's performance was singled out for particular praise, and chipped in with 0–2 to secure a 3–8 to 1–7 victory.

Egan progressed onto the UCC senior team during the 2011-12 college year, and lined out in the final of the Fitzgibbon Cup. CIT provided the opposition, however, UCC claimed a thrilling extra-time success as they celebrated the centenary of the competition in style on home soil with a narrow 2–15 to 2–14 victory. It was Egan's first Fitzgibbon Cup medal.

In 2012-13 UCC reached the Fitzgibbon decider once again. Mary Immaculate College were the surprise opponents, however, tradition prevailed and UCC retained their title with a 2–17 to 2–12 victory. It was Egan's second Fitzgibbon Cup medal.

=== Inter-county ===
In 2007 Egan first came to prominence for Cork as a member of the county's minor team. He was an unused substitute on the team that lost the Munster final to Tipperary, before later losing the All-Ireland decider to the same opposition.

Egan made his minor debut in a 2–17 to 2-16 Munster quarter-final defeat by Clare on 30 April 2008. In spite of this Cork still reached the provincial decider via the play-off route. Egan once again was praised for his effectiveness at wing-back, and collected a Munster medal following a narrow 0–19 to 0–18 defeat of Tipperary.

In 2009 Egan joined the Cork under-21 hurling team, however, after three seasons with the team, two which were spent as captain, he ended his period in that grade without any silverware.

Egan also spent one season with the Cork intermediate hurling team in 2009. He was an unused substitute for much of the championship campaign, however, he did collect a set of Munster and All-Ireland medals.

On 18 April 2010 Egan made his senior debut with Cork in a National Hurling League defeat by Galway. Later that season on 17 July 2010, he made his championship debut when he came on as a substitute in the replayed Munster decider. Cork were defeated by 1–16 to 1–13 after extra time.

After a 0–24 to 0–15 defeat by Limerick in the 2013 Munster decider, Cork still reached the All-Ireland final facing Clare on 8 September 2013. Three second-half goals through Conor Lehane, Anthony Nash and Pa Cronin, and a tenth point of the game from Patrick Horgan gave Cork a one-point lead as injury time came to an end. A last-gasp point from corner-back Domhnall O'Donovan earned Clare a 0–25 to 3–16 draw. The replay on 28 September was regarded as one of the best in recent years. Clare's Shane O'Donnell was a late addition to the team, and went on to score a hat-trick of goals in the first nineteen minutes of the game. Patrick Horgan top scored for Cork, however, further goals from Conor McGrath and Darach Honan secured a 5–16 to 3–16 victory for Clare.

On 13 July 2014 Egan won his first Munster medal when he was introduced as a substitute in Cork's 2–24 to 0–24 victory over Limerick.

== Career statistics ==
=== Inter-county ===
Team	Year	Pre-season		National League		Munster		All-Ireland		Total	
Team	Year	Apps	Score	Apps	Score	Apps	Score	Apps	Score	Apps	Score
Cork	2010	1	0-01	1	0-02	1	0-01	2	0-01	5	0-05
Cork	2011	1	0-01	5	0-01	1	0-00	3	0-00	10	0-02
Cork	2012	0	0-00	7	0-08	1	0-00	2	0-00	10	0-08
Cork	2013	—		5	0-02	2	0-01	4	0-00	11	0-03
Cork	2014	—		5	0-04	3	0-01	0	0-00	8	0-05
Cork	2015	—		—		—		—		—	
Cork	2016	3	0-00	4	0-01	1	0-00	2	0-02	10	0-03
Total		5	0-02	27	0-18	9	0-03	13	0-03	54	0-26

== Honours ==
Kilbrin

- Duhallow Junior A Hurling Championship (5): 2007, 2011, 2012, 2013, 2014
- Cork Junior B Football Championship (1): 2010

University College Cork

- Fitzgibbon Cup (2): 2012, 2013
- All-Ireland Freshers Hurling Championship (1): 2010

Cork

- Munster Senior Hurling Championship (1): 2014
- All-Ireland Intermediate Hurling Championship (1): 2009
- Munster Intermediate Hurling Championship (1): 2009
- Munster Minor Hurling Championship (1): 2008

Sporting positions
Preceded by Patrick Horgan	Cork Under-21 Hurling Captain; 2010-2011	Succeeded by Conor Lehane
