= Patrick Donnellan =

Irish hurler (born 1985)

Personal information
- Native name: Pádraig Ó Dónalláin (Irish)
- Born: 19 June 1985 (age 41) Ennis, County Clare, Ireland
- Occupation: Sales manager
- Height: 6 ft 2 in (188 cm)

Sport
- Sport: Hurling
- Position: Centre-back
Club
- Years: Club
- O'Callaghan's Mills
Club titles
- Clare titles: 0
Inter-county*
Years	County	Apps (scores)
2006-2017	Clare	26 (0-5)
Inter-county titles
- Munster titles: 0
- All-Irelands: 1
- NHL: 0
- All Stars: 1
- *Inter County team apps and scores correct as of 17:23, 27 December 2014.

Patrick Donnellan (born 19 June 1985) is an Irish hurler who played as a centre-back for the Clare senior team and captain from 2012. At club level Donnellan plays with O'Callaghan's Mills.

Born in O'Callaghan's Mills, County Clare, Donnellan first arrived on the inter-county scene at the age of seventeen when he first linked up with the Clare minor team before later joining the under-21 side. He made his senior debut during the 2006 championship. Donnellan has since gone on to play a key part in defence for Clare, and has won one All-Ireland medal and one National League (Division 2) medal.

As a member of the Munster inter-provincial team on a number of occasions, Donnellan has yet to win a Railway Cup medal. At club level he plays with O'Callaghan's Mills.

== Playing career ==
=== Inter-county ===
Donnellan first played for Clare as a member of the minor and under-21 teams, however, he ended his underage playing days without a single victory.

On 28 May 2006, Donnellan made his senior championship debut in Clare's 0–20 to 0-14 Munster semi-final defeat by Cork. He was dropped from the team in 2007 before being recalled the following year.

Donnellan was appointed captain of the Clare senior hurling team in 2012.

On 8 September 2013 Donnellan led out Clare in the All-Ireland final against Cork. Three second-half goals through Conor Lehane, Anthony Nash and Pa Cronin, and a tenth point of the game from Patrick Horgan gave Cork a one-point lead as injury time came to an end. A last-gasp point from corner-back Domhnall O'Donovan earned Clare a 0–25 to 3–16 draw. The replay on 28 September was regarded as one of the best in recent years. Clare's Shane O'Donnell was a late addition to the team, and went on to score a hat-trick of goals in the first nineteen minutes of the game. Horgan top scored for Cork, however, further goals from Conor McGrath and Darach Honan secured a 5–16 to 3–16 victory for Clare. It was Donnellan's first All-Ireland medal, while he became only the third Clare man to lift the Liam MacCarthy Cup.

In October 2017, Donnellan announced his retirement from inter-county hurling. He had missed the 2016 season with a cruciate ligament injury, and wasn't selected to play in the 2017 championship.

== Honours ==
=== Player ===
Clare

- All-Ireland Senior Hurling Championship (1): 2013 (c)
- National League (Division 2) (1): 2009
- Waterford Crystal Cup (2): 2009, 2013

=== Individual ===
Awards

- All-Star (1): 2013

Sporting positions
Preceded by Pat Vaughan	Clare Senior Hurling Captain; 2012-present	Succeeded by Incumbent
Achievements
Preceded by Eoin Larkin (Kilkenny)	All-Ireland Senior Hurling Final winning captain 2013	Succeeded by Lester Ryan (Kilkenny)
