= Kilian Murphy =

Irish hurler

Personal information
- Native name: Cillian Ó Murchú (Irish)
- Born: 4 July 1989 (age 37) Glounthaune, County Cork, Ireland
- Height: 5 ft 8 in (173 cm)

Sport
- Sport: Hurling
- Position: Full-back
Club
- Years: Club
- Erin's Own
Club titles
- Cork titles: 2
Inter-county*
Years	County	Apps (scores)
2013-2014	Cork	1 (0-00)
Inter-county titles
- Munster titles: 0
- All-Irelands: 0
- NHL: 0
- All Stars: 0
- *Inter County team apps and scores correct as of 21:27, 1 October 2013.

Kilian Murphy (born 4 July 1989) is an Irish hurler who played as a full-back for the Cork senior team.

Born in Glounthaune, County Cork, Murphy first played competitive hurling in his younger days. He arrived on the inter-county scene at the age of seventeen when he first linked up with the Cork minor team, before later lining out with the under-21 side. He joined the senior panel and made his debut during the 2013 championship.

At club level Murphy plays with Erin's Own and has won two championship medals.

== Playing career ==
=== Club ===
Murphy plays his club hurling with Erin's Own and has enjoyed some success.

In 2006 Murphy was just seventeen years-old when he joined the club's senior team as a substitute. It was a successful year as Erin's Own reached the championship decider and faced Cloyne. Two vital scores from Kieran "Hero" Murphy and Brian Corcoran inspired the team after man of the match Eoghan Murphy kept them in touch throughout the first half with superb free-taking and popped up again with a vital goal in the second half. Murphy was introduced as a substitute in the second half and collected a Cork Senior Hurling Championship medal following a 2–19 to 3–14 victory.

=== University ===
During his tenure at University College Cork, Murphy played a key role for the university's various hurling teams.

In 2012 he was a key member of the team when UCC reached the final of the Fitzgibbon Cup. Fierce local rivals Cork Institute of Technology provided the opposition, however, UCC claimed a thrilling extra-time success as they celebrated the centenary of the competition in style on home soil with a narrow 2–15 to 2–14 victory. It was Murphy's first Fitzgibbon Cup medal.

In 2012-13 UCC reached the Fitzgibbon decider once again. Mary Immaculate College were the surprise opponents, however, tradition prevailed and UCC retained their title with a 2–17 to 2–12 victory. It was Murphy's second Fitzgibbon Cup medal.

=== Inter-county ===
Murphy first came to prominence on the inter-county scene as a member of the Cork minor hurling team. He made his debut on 26 June 2007 in a Munster semi-final defeat of Clare. Cork lost the subsequent Munster decider to Tipperary, however, both sides faced each other in the subsequent All-Ireland decider. Cork took a four-point lead after the first eleven minutes, however, Tipp took control for the rest of the game and secured a 3–14 to 2–11 victory.

In 2013 Murphy joined the Cork senior hurling panel. He was an unused substitute for Cork's championship campaign until the All-Ireland final replay on 28 September, when he was introduced as a substitute. The game itself was regarded as one of the best deciders in recent years. Clare's Shane O'Donnell was a late addition to the team, and went on to score a hat-trick of goals in the first nineteen minutes of the game. Horgan top scored for Cork, however, further goals from Conor McGrath and Darach Honan secured a 5–16 to 3–16 victory for Clare.

On 3 April 2014 it was announced that Murphy had been dropped from Cork's championship panel.
