= Jackie O'Gorman =

Irish hurler (1943–2024)

Personal information
- Native name: Seánie Ó Gormáin (Irish)
- Born: October 1943 Cratloe, County Clare, Ireland
- Died: 22 January 2024 (aged 80) Blackrock, Dublin, Ireland
- Occupation: Maintenance foreman

Sport
- Sport: Hurling
- Position: Left corner-back
Club
- Years: Club
- 1964–1984: Cratloe
Club titles
- Clare titles: 0
Inter-county
- Years: County
- 1967–1979: Clare
Inter-county titles
- Munster titles: 0
- All-Irelands: 0
- NHL: 2
- All Stars: 0

John O'Gorman (October 1943 – 22 January 2024) was an Irish hurler. At club level he played with Cratloe and was also a member of the Clare senior hurling team. O'Gorman, who also served as a selector, is regarded as one of Clare's greatest ever players.

== Playing career ==
O'Gorman began hurling as a schoolboy at Cratloe national school. He progressed through the juvenile ranks with the Cratloe club, however, he received a two-year suspension after being found to be overage for a game against Newmarket-on-Fergus. O'Gorman enjoyed his first club success when Cratloe won the Clare JAHC title in 1964. He added a Clare IHC medal to his collection in 1970.

O'Gorman first appeared for the Clare senior hurling team when he was a substitute in the 1967 Munster final defeat by Tipperary. He made his debut later that year in an Oireachtas Cup game against Wexford. O'Gorman was an ever-present member of the team over the following 12 years. He played in Munster finals in 1972, 1974, 1977 and 1978 but suffered defeat on each occasion. O'Gorman won consecutive National Hurling League medals in 1977 and 1978, before retiring from inter-county hurling in 1979.

O'Gorman also earned selection to the Munster inter-provincial team in the Railway Cup and was an All-Star replacement on a number of occasions. He lost consecutive Clare IHC finals in 1979 and 1980, before ending his club career in 1984.

== Coaching career ==
O'Gorman became involved with the Clare senior team as a selector shortly after his playing career ended. He was part of the management team when Clare lost the Munster final in both 1981 and 1986. O'Gorman also served as a selector with the Cratloe club when they won the Clare IHC title in 1994.

== Personal life and death ==
O'Gorman married Joan Bennis from Patrickswell, County Limerick in August 1975. Her brothers, Phil and Richie Bennis, won All-Ireland SHC medals with Limerick in 1973.

O'Gorman died at the Blackrock Clinic in Dublin, on 22 January 2024, at the age of 80.

== Honours ==
=== Player ===
Cratloe

- Clare Intermediate Hurling Championship: 1970
- Clare Junior A Hurling Championship: 1964

Clare

- National Hurling League: 1976–77, 1977–78

=== Management ===
Cratloe

- Clare Intermediate Hurling Championship: 1994
