= Liam Markham =

Irish hurler (born 1990)

Personal information
- Nickname: Markham
- Born: 31 October 1990 (age 36) Ennis, Republic of Ireland
- Occupation: Tax Solicitor
- Height: 5 ft 10 in (178 cm)

Sport
- Sport: Hurling, Football
- Position: Left half back
Club
- Years: Club
- 2007-: Cratloe
Club titles
- Clare titles: 1
Inter-county
Years	County	Apps (scores)
2011-2014	Clare	4 (0-2)
Inter-county titles
- Munster titles: 0
- All-Irelands: 1
- NHL: 0
- All Stars: 0

Liam Markham is an Irish sportsperson. He plays hurling with his local club Cratloe and has been a member of the Clare senior inter-county team since 2011, making his Championship debut when coming on as a substitute against Galway on 2 July 2011.

Markham attended NUI Galway. He currently works as a Tax solicitor in London. At the age of 4 he temporarily lived in North Carolina
