= Conor Ryan =

Irish hurler

Personal information
- Native name: Conchúr Ó Riain (Irish)
- Born: 25 March 1991 (age 35) Limerick, Ireland
- Occupation: Stockbroker
- Height: 1.88 m (6 ft 2 in)

Sport
- Sport: Hurling
- Position: Midfield
Club
- Years: Club
- 2008–2017: Cratloe
Club titles
	Football	Hurling
Clare titles	2	2
Inter-county
Years	County	Apps (scores)
2013–2017	Clare	10 (0-6)
Inter-county titles
- All-Irelands: 1
- All Stars: 1

Conor Ryan is an Irish former hurler who played at midfield for the Clare senior team. At club level Ryan played with Cratloe.

He is the older brother of Clare hurler Diarmuid Ryan.

== Career ==
Ryan made his Senior Championship debut on 2 June 2013 against Waterford, starting in midfield in a 2–20 to 1–15 victory. Ryan was named as the Man of the Match in the drawn 2013 All-Ireland Senior Hurling Championship Final against Cork.

Ryan missed the 2017 season on medical advice but was part of the analytics support team for the year.

Ryan was forced to retire from hurling in 2018 for health reasons.

== Honours ==
=== Team ===
Clare

- All-Ireland Senior Hurling Championship (1) : 2013
- All-Ireland Under-21 Hurling Championship (1) : 2012
- Munster Under-21 Hurling Championship (1) : 2012

Cratloe

- Clare Senior Hurling Championship (2) : 2009, 2014
- Clare Senior Football Championship (2): 2013, 2014

=== Individual ===
- GAA-GPA All-Star Award (1): 2013
- All-Ireland Senior Hurling Championship Final Man of the Match (1): 2013 (Draw)

Awards
Preceded by Walter Walsh (Kilkenny)	All-Ireland Senior Hurling Final; Man of the Match; 2013 (drawn game)	Succeeded by Shane O'Donnell (Clare)
