= Cratloe GAA =

Sports club in County Clare, Ireland

Cratloe
- Creatlach
- Founded: 1887
- County: Clare
- Nickname: The Blues
- Colours: Blue and white
- Coordinates: 52°41′45.23″N 8°45′39.52″W

Playing kits
Regular Kit	Change Kit

Senior Club Championships
	All Ireland	Munster champions	Clare champions
Football:	-	0	3
Hurling:	-	0	2

Cratloe GAA is a Gaelic Athletic Association club located in the village of Cratloe, County Clare, Ireland. The club deals with both Gaelic football and hurling and basketball. The club competes in Clare GAA competitions.

In November 2013, Cratloe won their first ever Clare Senior Football Championship title, defeating Doonbeg by 0-10 to 0-7. They reached the 2013 Munster Senior Club Football Championship final on 1 December, but were defeated 0-13 to 0-12 by Dr Crokes.

In 2014, Cratloe won the Clare Senior Hurling championship on 5 October and the Clare Senior Football Championship seven days later. This was the first time that a Clare club had lifted both senior club trophies on the field of play since Ennis Dalcassians completed 'The Double' in 1929.

In 2023, Cratloe bridged a nine year gap to win their third senior football title. They defeated St. Breckan's, Lisdoonvarna by 1-10 to 1-08 in Cusack Park, Ennis.

== Major honours ==
=== Hurling ===
- Munster Senior Club Hurling Championship Runners-Up: 2014
- Clare Senior Hurling Championship (2): 2009, 2014
- Clare Intermediate Hurling Championship (4): 1937, 1943, 1970, 1994
- Clare Junior A Hurling Championship (4): 1935, 1964, 1976, 2013
- Clare Under-21 A Hurling Championship (1): 1992

=== Gaelic football ===
- Munster Senior Club Football Championship Runners-Up: 2013
- Clare Senior Football Championship (3): 2013, 2014, 2023
- Munster Intermediate Club Football Championship Runners-Up: 2009
- Clare Intermediate Football Championship (2): 2004, 2009
- Clare Junior A Football Championship (1): 2002
- Clare Football League Div.3 (1): 2022
- Clare Under-21 A Football Championship (2): 2009, 2011

== Notable players ==
- Podge Collins (son of Colm)
- John Galvin
- Liam Markham
- Conor McGrath
- Cathal McInerney
- Jackie O'Gorman
- Conor Ryan
- Billy Sheehan
