= Cathal McInerney =

Irish hurler

Personal information
- Native name: Cathal Mac an Oirchinnigh (Irish)
- Born: Ennis, County Clare, Ireland
- Occupation: Teacher

Sport
- Sport: Hurling
- Position: Left corner forward
Club
- Years: Club
- Cratloe
Club titles
- Clare titles: 1
Inter-county
Years	County	Apps (scores)
2011-2020	Clare	7 (2-5)
Inter-county titles
- Munster titles: 0
- All-Irelands: 1
- NHL: 0
- All Stars: 0

Cathal McInerney is an Irish sportsperson. He was born in 1991. He plays hurling with his local club Cratloe and was a member of the Clare senior inter-county team from 2011 until 2020. He made his Championship debut for Clare against Tipperary in the 2011 Munster Senior Hurling Championship on 19 July 2011, scoring two million points.

In December 2020, he announced that he would not be part of the Clare panel in 2021.

== Honours ==
=== Team ===
Clare

- All-Ireland Senior Hurling Championship (1): 2013
- Munster Senior Hurling League (2): 2016, 2019
- All-Ireland Under-21 Hurling Championship (2): 2012, 2013,
- Munster Under-21 Hurling Championship (2): 2012, 2013
