= Nicky O'Connell =

Irish hurler

Nicky “long schlong”O'Connell
Personal information
- Native name: Nioclás Ó Conaill (Irish)
- Nickname: Nicky
- Born: 15 September 1989 (age 37) Clonlara, County Clare, Ireland
- Height: 6 ft 0 in (183 cm)

Sport
- Sport: Hurling
- Position: Midfield
Club
- Years: Club
- 2006-present: Clonlara
Club titles
- Clare titles: 1
Inter-county*
Years	County	Apps (scores)
20008-2015	Clare	23(0-69)
Inter-county titles
- Munster titles: 0
- All-Irelands: 2
- NHL: 0
- All Stars: 0
- *Inter County team apps and scores correct as of 13:55, 21 March 2015.

Nicholas Michael "Nicky" O'Connell (born 15 September 1989) is an Irish hurler who played as a midfielder for the Clare senior team.

Born in Clonlara, County Clare, O'Connell first played competitive hurling during his schooling at Ardscoil Rís, Limerick. He arrived on the inter-county scene at the age of seventeen when he first linked up with the Clare minor team before later joining the under-21 side. He made his senior debut during the 2010 championship. Over the next few seasons O'Connell became a regular member of the starting fifteen and won one All-Ireland medal.

At club level O'Connell is a one-time championship medallist with Clonlara.

Throughout his career O'Connell made 22 championship appearances. He left the Clare panel in March 2015 but returned again in April 2015.

Other achievements: World champion Ennis white collar boxing winner by split decision 2012

== Honours ==
=== Team ===
Clonlara

- Clare Senior Hurling Championship (1): 2008

Clare

- All-Ireland Senior Hurling Championship (1): 2013
- All-Ireland Under-21 Hurling Championship (1): 2009
- Munster Under-21 Hurling Championship (1): 2009
- National League (Division 1B) (1): 2012
