= Brendan Bugler =

Irish hurler

Personal information
- Native name: Breandán Dé Buigléir (Irish)
- Born: 22 July 1985 (age 41) Whitegate, County Clare, Ireland
- Occupations: Secondary schoolteacher, St Flannans College Ennis
- Height: 6 ft 2 in (188 cm)

Sport
- Sport: Hurling
- Position: Right half back
Club
- Years: Club
- Whitegate
Club titles
- Clare titles: 0
Inter-county*
Years	County	Apps (scores)
2007-2017	Clare	25 (0-8)
Inter-county titles
- Munster titles: 0
- All-Irelands: 1
- NHL: 1
- All Stars: 2
- *Inter County team apps and scores correct as of 20:04, 26 October 2012.

Brendan Bugler (born 1985) is a former Irish hurler who played as a right wing-back for the Clare senior team.

Bugler made his first appearance for the team during the 2007 National League and became a regular player over the last few seasons of his playing career. During that time he has won one All Ireland Senior Hurling Championship, one National League (Division 1B) medal, one Waterford Crystal Cup medal and two All-Star award.

At club level Bugler plays with Whitegate.

He served as a Wexford senior hurling team selector under the management of Davy Fitzgerald from October 2019, replacing Stephen Molumphy.

== Playing career ==
=== Club ===
Bugler plays with his home club in Whitegate. In 2013 he captained them to an Intermediate county title. He also plays football with Cratloe.

=== Inter-universities ===
During his tenure as a student at the University of Limerick, Bugler enjoyed some success with the university senior team. In 2011 he won a Fitzgibbon Cup medal following a 1–17 to 2–11 defeat of city rivals Limerick Institute of Technology.

=== Inter-county ===
Bugler first came to prominence on the inter-county scene as a member of the Clare minor hurling panel in 2002. He enjoyed little success in this grade, before later moving onto the Clare under-21 team. Bugler also enjoyed little success in this grade of hurling.

In 2007 Bugler made his senior debut for Clare in a National League game against Down. Later that year he made his championship debut at midfield in a Munster quarter-final defeat by Cork.

Two years later in 2009 Bugler enjoyed his first major success with the Clare senior hurlers. A 1-12 t 1–7 defeat of Tipperary secured the pre-season Waterford Crystal Cup title.

Bugler won a National League (Division 1B) medal in 2012 as Clare defeated Limerick by 0–21 to 1–16. In spite of enjoying little success in the subsequent championship, Bugler finished off the season by winning an All-Star award.

In October 2017, Bugler released a statement confirming his retirement from inter-county hurling.

=== Inter-provincial ===
Bugler has also lined out with Munster in the inter-provincial series of games.

== Coaching ==
In October 2019, Bugler was named by Wexford manager Davy Fitzgerald as one of his selectors for 2020.

On 28 December 2020, Offaly GAA club Birr confirmed that Bugler would be its senior manager for 2021.

In September 2023, he was named by Brian Lohan as one of the new coaches of the Clare senior hurling team. On 21 July 2024, Clare defeated Cork by 3–29 to 1–34 to win the All-Ireland title for a fifth time.

== Honours ==
=== Team ===
Whitegate

Clare Intermediate Hurling Championship (2) : 2009, 2013

Clare

- All-Ireland Senior Hurling Championship (1) : 2013
- National Hurling League (2): 2012 (Div 1B), 2016

=== Individual ===
- GAA-GPA All-Star Award (2): 2012, 2013
