= Cian Dillon =

Irish hurler

Personal information
- Native name: Cian Ó Diolún (Irish)
- Born: 30 October 1988 (age 38) Ennis, Ireland
- Occupation: Primary school teacher
- Height: 1.88 m (6 ft 2 in)

Sport
- Sport: Hurling
- Position: Left Corner Back
Club
- Years: Club
- 2006–: Crusheen
Club titles
- Clare titles: 2
College
- Years: College
- NUI Galway
Inter-county*
Years	County	Apps (scores)
2010–2018	Clare	74 (0-4)
Inter-county titles
- All-Irelands: 1
- NHL: 1
- *Inter County team apps and scores correct as of 23:01, 9 January 2018.

Cian Dillon (born 30 October 1988) is an Irish hurler who plays for club side Crusheen. He usually plays as a left corner-back, but can also be deployed as a full-back. Dillon was a member of the Clare senior hurling team that won the 2013 All-Ireland Championship.

== Career ==
Dillon played hurling at juvenile and underage levels with the Crusheen club, and later became a member of the club's senior hurling team. He won back-to-back Clare Senior Hurling Championship titles with the club in 2010 and 2011.

Dillon first played for Clare as a member of the minor team in 2006, before later playing at full-back on Clare's All-Ireland Under-21 Championship-winning team in 2009. He made his first appearance with the Clare senior team in 2010. Dillon won an All-Ireland Championship medal in 2013, when Clare claimed the title for the first time in 16 years. He later won a National Hurling League medal as joint captain of the team in 2016. Dillon announced his retirement from inter-county hurling on 9 January 2019.

== Career statistics ==
Team	Year	National League			Munster		All-Ireland		Total	
Team	Year	Division	Apps	Score	Apps	Score	Apps	Score	Apps	Score
Clare	2010	Division 2	7	0-00	1	0-00	1	0-00	9	0-00
Clare	2011	Division 2	7	0-00	1	0-00	1	0-00	9	0-00
Clare	2012	Division 1B	6	0-00	1	0-00	2	0-00	9	0-00
Clare	2013	Division 1A	0	0-00	2	0-00	6	0-01	8	0-01
Clare	2014	Division 1A	7	0-00	1	0-00	2	0-01	10	0-01
Clare	2015	Division 1A	6	0-00	1	0-00	2	0-00	9	0-00
Clare	2016	Division 1B	8	0-02	1	0-00	3	0-00	12	0-02
Clare	2017	Division 1A	6	0-00	1	0-00	1	0-00	8	0-00
Clare	2018	Division 1A	0	0-00	0	0-00	0	0-00	0	0-00
Total			47	0-02	9	0-00	18	0-02	74	0-04

== Honours ==
Crusheen

- Clare Senior Hurling Championship (2): 2010, 2011

Clare

- All-Ireland Senior Hurling Championship (1): 2013
- National League Division 1 (1): 2016
- National League Division 1B (1): 2012
- All-Ireland Under-21 Hurling Championship (1): 2009
- Munster Under-21 Hurling Championship (1): 2009
