= Domhnall O'Donovan =

Irish hurler

Personal information
- Native name: Domhnall Ó Donnabháin (Irish)
- Born: 29 April 1988 (age 38) Limerick, Ireland
- Occupation: Business Analyst
- Height: 1.8 m (5 ft 11 in)

Sport
- Sport: Hurling
- Position: Right Corner Back
Club
- Years: Club
- 2006-: Clonlara
Club titles
- Clare titles: 1
College
- Years: College
- NUI Galway
College titles
- Fitzgibbon titles: 1
Inter-county
Years	County	Apps (scores)
2010-2016	Clare	13 (0-1)
Inter-county titles
- Munster titles: 0
- All-Irelands: 1
- NHL: 0
- All Stars: 0

Domhnall O'Donovan (born 29 April 1988) is an Irish hurler who plays as a right corner-back for the Clare senior team.

Born in Clonlara, County Clare, O'Donovan first played competitive hurling whilst at school in St. Munchin's College. He arrived on the inter-county scene at the age of twenty-one when he first linked up with the Clare under-21 team. He made his senior debut in the 2010 Waterford Crystal Cup. O'Donovan has since gone on to play a key role in defence for Clare.

At club level O'Donovan has won one championship medal with Clonlara.

O'Donovan played a key part in the drawn 2013 All Ireland Senior Hurling Final on 8 September against Cork. Despite leading for the whole game Clare found themselves a point down after 72 minutes. O'Donovan scored his first ever championship point coming from corner back to send the match to a replay which Clare won.

In February 2016, O'Donovan announced that he had left the Clare senior hurling panel due to work commitments.

O'Donovan attended NUI Galway. There he studied civil engineering, previously having engineered for himself a total of 530 Leaving Certificate points. His twin brother Cormac was a student of the same course at Galway as well. Both were part of the university hurling team during their winning 2010 Fitzgibbon Cup campaign.

As of 2025 he is a coach and a player for the Hurling Club of Madison located in the state of Wisconsin in the United States of America

== Honours ==
=== Team ===
NUI Galway

- Fitzgibbon Cup (1): 2010

Clonlara

- Clare Senior Hurling Championship (1): 2008
- Munster Intermediate Hurling Championship (1) : 2007
- Clare Intermediate Hurling Championship (1) : 2007

Clare

- All-Ireland Senior Hurling Championship (1): 2013
- All-Ireland Under-21 Hurling Championship (1): 2009
- Munster Under-21 Hurling Championship (1): 2009
