= Shane O'Donnell =

Irish hurler

Personal information
- Native name: Séan Ó Dónaill (Irish)
- Nickname: SOD
- Born: 15 June 1994 (age 32) Ennis, County Clare, Ireland
- Height: 6 ft (183 cm)

Sport
- Sport: Hurling
- Position: Full-forward
Club
- Years: Club
- 2011-present: Éire Óg, Ennis
Club titles
- Clare titles: 1
College
- Years: College
- 2012-2018: University College Cork
College titles
- Fitzgibbon titles: 0
Inter-county*
| Years | County | Apps (scores) |
| 2013-present | Clare | 62 (16-80) |
Inter-county titles
- Munster titles: 0
- All-Irelands: 2
- NHL: 2
- All Stars: 3
- *Inter County team apps and scores correct as of 22:09, 20 June 2026.

Shane O'Donnell (born 15 June 1994) is an Irish hurler who played as a forward for the Clare senior team.

Born and bred in Ennis, Co Clare O'Donnell first arrived on the inter-county scene at the age of sixteen when he first linked up with the Clare minor team, before later lining out with the under-21 side. He made his senior debut in the 2013 Waterford Crystal Cup. O'Donnell has since gone on to play a key part for Clare, and has won two All-Ireland medals, two National Hurling League medals and one Waterford Crystal Cup medal.

At club level O'Donnell plays with Éire Óg, Ennis. He missed the 2019 National Hurling League as he was awarded a Fulbright Scholarship to Harvard University in the US. He won Clare SHC Final for Eire Og on 5/10/2025.

== Playing career ==
=== Inter-county ===
O'Donnell made his senior debut during the pre-season Waterford Crystal Cup in 2013. It was a successful campaign for Clare, as a 1–21 to 1–13 defeat of Tipperary gave O'Donnell a winners' medal in that competition. Later that year he made his championship debut at left corner-forward in a Munster quarter-final defeat of Waterford. The rest of the championship campaign saw O'Donnell dropped from the starting fifteen for several games, however, he was a late addition at full-forward for Clare's All-Ireland final replay against Cork. His selection seemed surprising but was justified, as O'Donnell scored a hat-trick of goals in the first nineteen minutes of the game. Further goals from Conor McGrath and Darach Honan secured a 5–16 to 3–16 victory following a classic championship decider. The win gave O'Donnell an All-Ireland medal, while he was also named man of the match.

In October 2013, O'Donnell won the Opel Player of the Month Award for September.

In June 2021, he received a heavy blow when training with the Clare team that left him with a serious concussion. It ruled him out of the 2021 Championship. He returned to the Clare panel in March 2022.

On 21 July 2024, he started in the full-forward line as Clare won the All-Ireland for the first time in 11 years after an extra-time win against Cork by 3–29 to 1-34, claiming their fifth All-Ireland title. O'Donnell won his third All Star and was selected as GAA/GPA Hurler of the Year at the end of the 2024 season.

On 5 July 2026, O'Donnell played his last game for Clare in the 2026 All-Ireland Senior Hurling Championship semi-final against Limerick at Croke Park, as Limerick won by 1–21 to 1–19. Speaking after the game to RTE Sport, O'Donnell said "It's been an honour to be able to wear the Clare jersey, and I've enjoyed every minute of it,".

== Personal life ==
O’Donnell completed his degree in UCC where he was a Quercus Scholar. He completed a PhD in Microbiology in 2021. Between 2018 and 2019, he spent six months in Harvard University as the recipient of a Fulbright scholarship.

== Career statistics ==
As of 20 June 2026

| Team | Year | National League | | | Munster | | All-Ireland | | Total | |
| Team | Year | Division | Apps | Score | Apps | Score | Apps | Score | Apps | Score |
|---|---|---|---|---|---|---|---|---|---|---|
| Clare | 2013 | Division 1A | 6 | 1-03 | 2 | 1-01 | 5 | 5-04 | 13 | 7-08 |
| Clare | 2014 | Division 1A | 5 | 4-02 | 0 | 0-00 | 0 | 0-00 | 5 | 4-02 |
| Clare | 2015 | Division 1A | 6 | 3-05 | 1 | 0-01 | 2 | 1-02 | 9 | 4-08 |
| Clare | 2016 | Division 1B | 7 | 0-01 | 1 | 0-00 | 3 | 1-06 | 11 | 1-07 |
| Clare | 2017 | Division 1A | 2 | 0-00 | 2 | 2-02 | 1 | 0-02 | 5 | 2-04 |
| Clare | 2018 | Division 1A | 6 | 1-03 | 5 | 0-03 | 3 | 1-08 | 14 | 2-14 |
| Clare | 2019 | Division 1A | 0 | 0-00 | 4 | 1-01 | — | | 4 | 1-01 |
| Clare | 2020 | Division 1B | 5 | 3-07 | 1 | 0-00 | 3 | 0-02 | 9 | 3-09 |
| Clare | 2021 | Division 1B | — | | — | | — | | — | |
| Clare | 2022 | Division 1A | 0 | 0-00 | 5 | 0-09 | 2 | 0-06 | 7 | 0-15 |
| Clare | 2023 | Division 1A | 0 | 0-00 | 5 | 0-08 | 2 | 2-03 | 7 | 2-11 |
| Clare | 2024 | Division 1A | 1 | 0-01 | 5 | 1-07 | 3 | 1-07 | 9 | 2-15 |
| Clare | 2025 | Division 1A | 0 | 0-00 | 2 | 0-00 | — | | 2 | 0-00 |
| Clare | 2026 | Division 1B | 1 | 1-01 | 4 | 0-06 | 1 | 0-02 | 6 | 1-09 |
| Career total | | | 39 | 13-23 | 37 | 5-38 | 25 | 11-42 | 101 | 29-103 |

== Honours ==
Clare

- All-Ireland Senior Hurling Championship (2): 2013, 2024
- National Hurling League (2): 2016, 2024
- Waterford Crystal Cup (1): 2013
- All-Ireland Under-21 Hurling Championship (2): 2013 2014
- Munster Under-21 Hurling Championship (2): 2013 2014
- Munster Minor Hurling Championship (1) : 2011

Eire Og

- Clare Senior Hurling Championship (1): 2025

Awards

- All-Star Award (3): 2022, 2023, 2024
- GAA/GPA Hurler of the Year (1): 2024
- The Sunday Game Team of the Year (3): 2022, 2023, 2024
- The Sunday Game Hurler of the Year: 2024
- All-Ireland Senior Hurling Championship Final Man of the Match (1): 2013 (replay)

Awards
| Preceded by Conor Ryan | All-Ireland Senior Hurling Final; Man of the Match; 2013 (replay) | Succeeded by Richie Hogan |
