= Darach Honan =

Irish hurler

Personal information
- Native name: Darach Ó hEoghanáin (Irish)
- Born: 21 March 1990 (age 36) Clonlara, County Clare, Ireland
- Occupation: Financial Advisor
- Height: 6 ft 6 in (198 cm)

Sport
- Sport: Hurling
- Position: Full-forward
Club
- Years: Club
- 2007-present: Clonlara
Club titles
- Clare titles: 1
Inter-county*
Years	County	Apps (scores)
2010-2017	Clare	13 (5-21)
Inter-county titles
- Munster titles: 0
- All-Irelands: 1
- NHL: 1
- All Stars: 0
- *Inter County team apps and scores correct as of 23:54, 6 September 2012.

Darach Honan (born 21 March 1990 in Clonlara, County Clare, Ireland) is an Irish sportsperson. He plays hurling with his local club Clonlara and was a member of the Clare senior inter-county team from 2010 until 2017.

== Early life ==
Born in Clonlara, County Clare, Honan is the son of Colm Honan, a former Clare hurler, and Máire Ní Ghráda, an academic and native of Cork. Honan was educated at the local national school before attending Ard Scoil Rís in Limerick. Here he concentrated on basketball and enjoyed much success at All-Ireland level with the school. Honan subsequently studied at University College Cork.

== Playing career ==
=== Club ===
Honan plays his club hurling with Clonlara and has enjoyed much success. In 2008 he was just out of the minor grade when Clonlara lined out against Newmarket-on-Fergus in the final of the county senior championship. On that occasion Clonlara ended an 89-year wait to claim the championship with a 1–12 to 1–9 win.

=== Inter-county ===
Honan first played hurling for Clare as a member of the county's minor team. He enjoyed little success in this grade but later became a key member of the Clare under-21 side. In 2009 Clare made history by winning the Munster title in that grade for the very first time. Honan's side later played in the All-Ireland final against Kilkenny, claiming a narrow 0–15 to 0–14 victory and a very first All-Ireland under-21 title. Honan was later named the inaugural Bord Gáis Energy Breakthrough Player of the Year.

Honan made his senior championship debut for Clare in a Munster semi-final clash against Waterford in 2010. In spite of being beaten Honan scored an impressive 1–3 on his debut. Honan came on as a sub against Cork and scored Clare's fifth goal in the 2013 All-Ireland Hurling final replay played at Croke Park as Clare won their fourth All Ireland senior title.

In October 2017, Honan announced his retirement from inter-county hurling.

== Honours ==
- 1 All-Ireland Senior Hurling Championship 2013
- 1 All-Ireland Under-21 Hurling Championship 2009
- 1 Munster Under-21 Hurling Championship 2009
- 1 National Hurling League Division 1B 2012

=== Individual ===
- Bord Gáis Under-21 Player of the Year: 2013
