= Conor McGrath =

Irish hurler (born 1991)

Personal information
- Native name: Conchúir Mac Craith (Irish)
- Born: 29 May 1991 (age 35) Ennis, County Clare, Ireland
- Occupation: Financial auditor
- Height: 1.78 m (5 ft 10 in)

Sport
- Sport: Hurling
- Position: Left corner-forward
Club
- Years: Club
- 2008-: Cratloe
Club titles
	Football	Hurling
Clare titles	2	2
Inter-county*
Years	County	Apps (scores)
2011-present	Clare	19 (6-57)
Inter-county titles
- Munster titles: 0
- All-Irelands: 1
- NHL: 1
- All Stars: 1
- *Inter County team apps and scores correct as of 17:28, 11 June 2016.

Conor McGrath (born 29 May 1991) is an Irish hurler who plays as a left corner-forward for the Clare senior team.

Born in Ennis, County Clare, McGrath was introduced to hurling by his father, a Toomevara native who was heavily involved in hurling coaching. He developed his skills in the Harty Cup with St. Caimin's Community School, while simultaneously becoming involved at underage levels with the Cratloe club. A dual player at the highest level, McGrath has won two championship medals each in both hurling and Gaelic football.

McGrath made his debut on the inter-county scene when he first linked up with the Clare minor team. After little success in this grade, he later won two All-Ireland medals with the under-21 team. McGrath made his senior debut during the 2011 championship. He has since gone on to play a key role for Clare in attack during a successful era, and has won one All-Ireland medal and one National Hurling League medal.

McGrath attended NUI Galway.

== Playing career ==
=== Club ===
In 2009 McGrath was at right corner-forward as Cratloe qualified for their first ever championship decider. Reigning champions Clonlara provided the opposition in what turned out to be a close game. McGrath scored 2–1 in helping Cratloe to a 3–5 to 1–9 victory. It was a first championship medal for McGrath.

McGrath was a key member of the Cratloe senior football team that faced Doonbeg in the 2013 final. A close game developed, however, a 1–0 to 0–7 victory gave McGrath the distinction of being a dual championship medal winner.

2014 was a huge year for McGrath, as the Cratloe hurlers and footballers reached the finals of their respective championships. A 0–14 to 0–6 defeat of Crusheen in the hurling decider gave McGrath, who scored 0–6, a second championship medal. A week later the Cratloe lined out against Éire Óg in the football decider. A 2–12 to 1–11 victory not only saw the team retain the football title they won for the first time the previous year but they were also the first team in Clare in 100 years to win both senior hurling and football titles in the same season.

=== Inter-county ===
McGrath first played for Clare as a member of the minor team, however, he enjoyed little success in this grade. He was still eligible for the minor grade when he was drafted onto the under-21 panel in 2009. McGrath won his first Munster medal that year after being introduced as a substitute in Clare's 2–17 to 2–12 defeat of Waterford. On 13 September 2009, Clare faced Kilkenny in the All-Ireland decider. A last-gasp Cormac O'Donovan point secured a narrow 0–15 to 0–14 victory. McGrath was introduced as a substitute once again and collected his first All-Ireland medal in what was Clare's first championship title.

== Career statistics ==
As of match played 5 June 2016.

Team	Year	National League			Championship		Total	
Team	Year	Division	Apps	Score	Apps	Score	Apps	Score
Clare	2011	Division 2	6	3-13	2	1-11	8	4-24
Clare	2012	Division 1B	4	2-35	3	0-15	7	2-50
Clare	2013	Division 1A	1	0-02	8	3-10	9	3-12
Clare	2014	Division 1A	7	3-15	3	1-11	10	4-26
Clare	2015	Division 1A	6	0-11	2	1-07	8	1-18
Clare	2016	Division 1B	8	1-41	1	0-03	9	1-44
Total			32	9-117	19	6-57	51	15-174

== Honours ==
Cratloe

- Clare Senior Hurling Championship (2) : 2009, 2014
- Clare Senior Football Championship (2) : 2013, 2014
- Clare Intermediate Football Championship (1) : 2009

Clare

- All-Ireland Senior Hurling Championship (1): 2013
- National Hurling League Division 1 (1) : 2016
- National Hurling League Division 1B (1) : 2012
- All-Ireland Under-21 Hurling Championship (2) : 2009, 2012
- Munster Under-21 Hurling Championship (2) : 2009, 2012

=== Individual ===
Awards

- GAA-GPA All-Star Award (1): 2013
- Clare Senior Hurling Championship Top-Scorer (1) : 2014 (7-41)

Achievements
Preceded by Barry Daly (Galway)	All-Ireland Under-21 Hurling Final winning captain 2012	Succeeded by Paul Flanagan (Clare)
