= Clare GAA =

County board of the Gaelic Athletic Association in Ireland

- Irish: An Clár CLG
- Nickname(s): The Banner
- Province: Munster
- Dominant sport: Hurling
- Ground(s): Zimmer Biomet Páirc Chíosóg, Ennis
- County colours: Saffron Blue

County teams
- NFL: Division 3
- NHL: Division 1A
- Football Championship: Sam Maguire Cup
- Hurling Championship: Liam MacCarthy Cup
- Ladies' Gaelic football: Brendan Martin Cup
- Camogie: O'Duffy Cup

The Clare County Board of the Gaelic Athletic Association (GAA) (Irish: Cumann Lúthchleas Gael Coiste Contae an Chláir) or Clare GAA is one of the 32 county boards of the GAA in Ireland, and is responsible for Gaelic games in County Clare. Clare plays its home games at Zimmer Biomet Páirc Chíosóg in Ennis.

The county hurling team competes in Division 1 of the National Hurling League and in the Munster Senior Hurling Championship (SHC), the former of which it has won five times, most recently in 2024. Clare has won the All-Ireland Senior Hurling Championship (SHC) five times in its history. The county won its first title in 1914 and took another 81 years to win a second title in 1995, which remains the record wait for a successive title in Senior Championship history. Clare won All-Ireland SHC titles in 1914, 1995, 1997, 2013 and 2024.

The county football team contested the 1917 All-Ireland Senior Football Championship Final.

== Governance ==
Pat Fitzgerald served as county secretary from June 1990. He became one of the longest serving administrators in the province of Munster. Initially in the role in a voluntary capacity, he was offered his first full-time contract in 2009 and a second one in 2016. Fitzgerald is with the Sixmilebridge club. He is the father of Davy Fitzgerald, the former hurler and manager of the Clare senior hurlers. A Garda investigation was established into claims that Fitzgerald was being abused on social media. Fitzgerald mentioned it in his 2019 annual report. In June 2022, Pat Fitzgerald announced his intention to resign from his role as Clare county secretary after 32 years.

Deirdre Murphy took over as Head of Operations from October 2022.

== Zimmer Biomet Páirc Chíosóg ==
Zimmer Biomet Páirc Chíosóg (Irish: Páirc Uí Chíosóg) is the primary home of the Clare hurling, football, camogie and Peil na mBan teams at all grades. Zimmer Biomet Páirc Chíosóg was previously named Cusack Park but the naming rights were sold in 2025

Named after the founder of the GAA, Michael Cusack, the ground had an original capacity of about 28,000 (mostly terraced), but following a 2011 safety review, the certified capacity was reduced to 14,864. Three sides of the ground are terraced - the two areas behind the goals and one terraced length of the pitch which is also covered.

In 2006 there were media reports of substantial offers from property developers to buy the stadium and relocate it to a new 42,000 capacity site outside the town centre. However by 2009 it appeared unlikely given the recent Celtic Tiger crash that this would happen. Between 2009-12, Clare GAA invested over €500,000 in refurbishment works including pitch drainage and fencing around the pitch. In 2015 a major renovation started, this included the demolition and re-erection of the main stand and construction of a new entrance/exit at the north side of the stadium. Once completed in late 2017 the official capacity was increased to 19,000 people for the start of the 2018 season.

On 17 June 2018, the stadium was completely sold out for the first time since re-opening for the visit of local hurling rivals Limerick.

The knockout stages of the Clare Senior Hurling Championship and the Clare Senior Football Championship are held annually in the stadium.

== Hurling ==
=== Clubs ===
Clubs contest the Clare Senior Hurling Championship. That competition's most successful club is Newmarket-on-Fergus, with 23 titles.

=== County team ===
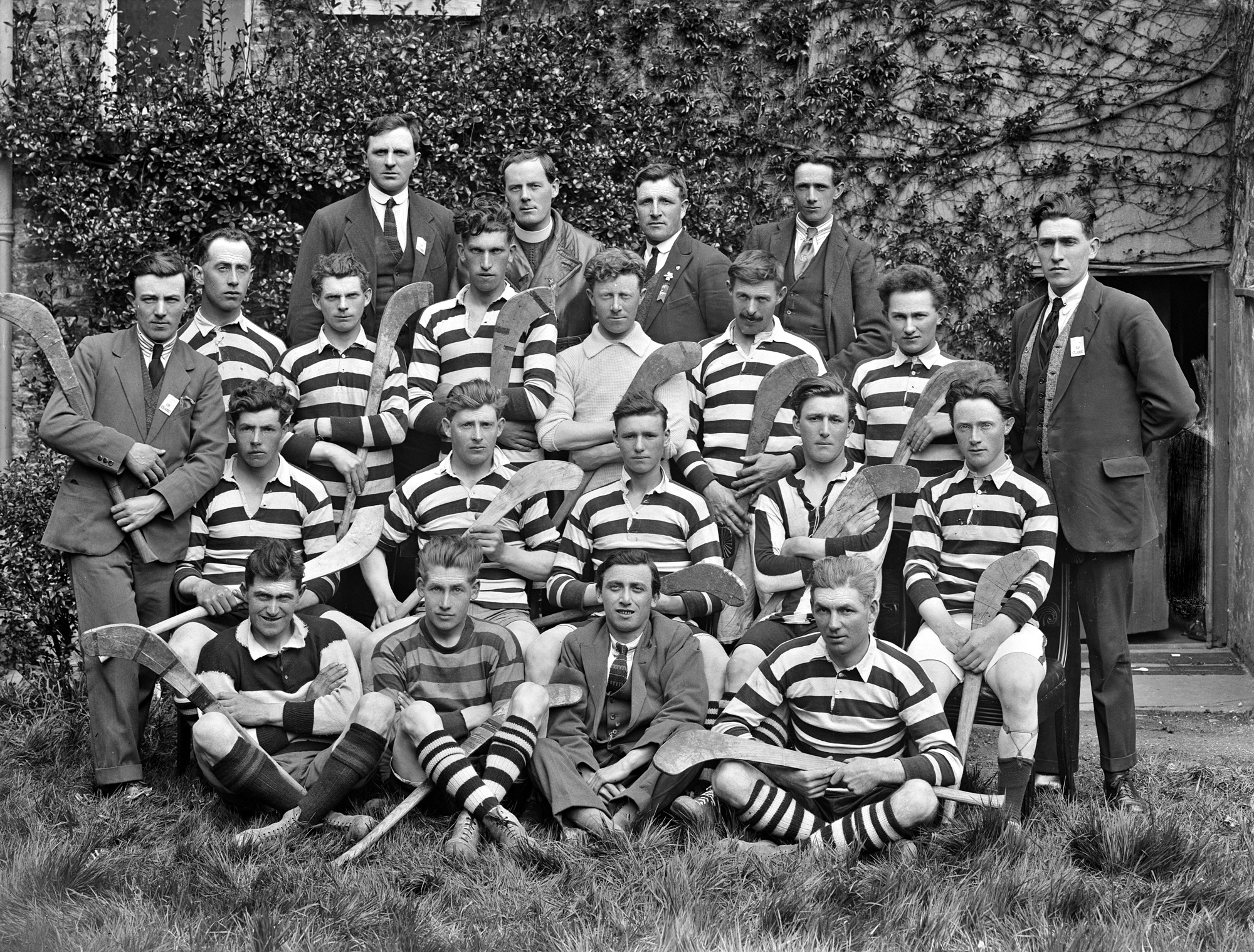
An early Clare hurling team

Clare have won six Munster SHCs and five All-Ireland SHCs.

In 1889, Clare won its first Munster SHC title after receiving a walkover from Kerry in the final. Clare contested the 1889 All-Ireland Senior Hurling Championship Final, but lost to Dublin by a scoreline of 5–1 to 1–6. Clare won a second Munster SHC title in 1914, defeating Cork by a scoreline of 3–2 to 3–1. Clare then defeated Galway in the All-Ireland semi-final by 6–6 to 0–0 to reach the 1914 All-Ireland Senior Hurling Championship Final. In that game Clare defeated Laois by a scoreline of 2–4 to 1–2, with Amby Power becoming the first man to captain Clare to an All-Ireland hurling title. Clare won another Munster SHC title in 1932, defeating Cork on a scoreline of 5–2 to 4–1. The team contested the 1932 All-Ireland Senior Hurling Championship Final, but lost to Kilkenny by a scoreline of 3–3 to 2–3.

After losing Munster SHC finals in 1993 and 1994, Len Gaynor was replaced as manager by Ger Loughnane, from Feakle. Clare made a return to the Munster SHC final in 1995 after a 2–13 to 3–9 victory over Cork in the semi-final. In the closing minutes of that game, Cork were leading by two points, at which point Clare earned a sideline, which was taken by Fergie Tuohy. It travelled to the edge of the square, where Ollie Baker doubled on the sliotar, scoring a goal, to send Clare through to the decider. In the final, Clare faced Limerick. Clare dominated the game and easily won, by a scoreline of 1–17 to 0–11. This was Clare's first Munster SHC title in 63 years. In the All-Ireland SHC semi-final, Clare played Galway. 2–01 from Ger 'Sparrow' O'Loughlin and 0–07 from Jamesie O'Connor helped Clare through to the final by a scoreline of 3–12 to 1–13. Offaly, the reigning All-Ireland SHC champions, awaited Clare in that game. In the second half, an Anthony Daly free rebounded off the post and fell to Éamonn Taaffe at the edge of the square; Taaffe sent the ball into the back of the Offaly net. Clare won by a scoreline of 1–13 to 2–8 to secure a first All-Ireland SHC in 81 years.

In 1997, Clare defeated Kerry and Cork to qualify for a Munster SHC final against Tipperary. That game was held in Páirc Uí Chaoimh, Cork and Clare won a close match by a scoreline of 1–18 to 0–18. Clare then defeated Kilkenny by a scoreline of 1–17 to 1–13 in the All-Ireland SHC semi-final. In the subsequent All-Ireland SHC final, Clare faced Tipperary, an opponent that had advanced through "the back door" to reach the final. A late Tipperary goal gave that team the lead but, entering the closing stages, the teams were tied at 2–13 to 0–19. Jamesie O'Connor then scored a point that was enough to win Clare the All-Ireland SHC title. He finished the game with 0–7 and later won the All Stars Hurler of the Year award.

In 1998, Clare retained the Munster SHC title. The team defeated Cork by a scoreline of 0–21 to 0–13 to qualify for the final, where they faced Waterford. A late goal from a Paul Flynn free tied the game at 1–16 to 3–10 and sent it to a replay. Clare won the replay by a scoreline of 2–16 to 0–10. Clare faced Offaly in the 1998 All-Ireland SHC semi-final. That game ended in a draw, 1–13 apiece. In the replay Clare were leading in the closing stages by a scoreline of 2–10 to 1–16; however the referee accidentally blew the match up early. Disarray engulfed Croke Park as disgruntled Offaly supporters began a sit-down protest on the pitch. As the full 70 minutes had not been completed, the semi-final had to be replayed. On this occasion, Offaly won by a scoreline of 0–16 to 0–13.

In 2012, Davy Fitzgerald began his tenure as Clare manager. Managerial backroom team included Paul Kinnerk and Seoirse Bulfin. At that time Clare had not won a championship match since 2008 and the team was also in the second tier of the National Hurling League. Clare won Division 1B of the league to gain promotion for the following year. In the Munster SHC, Clare lost to Waterford by a scoreline of 2–17 to 1–18. Clare then faced Dublin in a 2012 All-Ireland Senior Hurling Championship qualifier. In what was Tony Kelly's first senior game for the county, he scored 1–02 to help Clare win by a scoreline of 1–16 to 0–16. In the next round Limerick defeated Clare by a scoreline of 3–18 to 1–20. In the 2013 season, Clare defeated Waterford in the Munster SHC quarter-final by a scoreline of 2–20 to 1–15, outscoring them by 2–12 to 0–6 in the second half. This was the first time Clare had won a Munster SHC game since 2008. In the Munster SHC semi-final, Cork defeated Clare by a scoreline of 0–23 to 0–15. Clare then defeated Laois and Wexford in the 2013 All-Ireland SHC qualifiers. Thus Clare advanced to an All-Ireland SHC quarter-final against Galway, winning that game by a scoreline of by 1–23 to 2–14. Munster SHC winner Limerick awaited Clare in the All-Ireland SHC semi-final. An early Darach Honan goal helped Clare win by a scoreline of 1–22 to 0–18 and qualify for a first All-Ireland SHC final since 2002. The 2013 All-Ireland Senior Hurling Championship Final was held on 8 September and Clare led at half-time. In the second half Cork scored three goals to get back into the game. With the sides level, Patrick Horgan scored to put Cork into the lead. Moments later, in injury-time, Domhnall O'Donovan pointed to send the game to a replay, the full-time score being 3–16 to 0–25. On 28 September 2013, Clare won the replay by a scoreline of 5–16 to 3–16. Shane O'Donnell scored 3–3 of Clare's total in that game. A Conor McGrath goal in the 61st minute was quickly followed by three points to put Clare 4–16 to 2–16 ahead. A late Stephen Moylan goal was cancelled out by a Darach Honan goal and Clare won by a scoreline of 5–16 to 3–16. Clare's centre-forward, Tony Kelly, was awarded both the All Stars Young Hurler of the Year and All Stars Hurler of the Year awards.

Clare won the 2016 National Hurling League in May that year, a first since 1978 after a 1–23 to 2–19 win against Waterford in a replay.

On 21 July 2024, Clare won the All-Ireland SHC final against Cork by 3–29 to 1–34 after extra-time, claiming a fifth All-Ireland SHC title and a first in 11 years.

== Camogie ==
Camogie was established by County Secretary, Mick Hennessy, of Clooney in 1934. Peggy Nagle of Ennistymon and Sheila Carroll of Lahinch revived the game in 1958. Under Camogie's National Development Plan 2010-2015, "Our Game, Our Passion", five new camogie clubs were to be established in the county by 2015.

Clare have the following achievements in camogie.

All-Ireland Championship

- All-Ireland Junior Camogie Championship: 5
  - 1974, 1981, 1986, 2008, 2023
- All-Ireland Intermediate Camogie Championship: 3
  - 1993, 1995, 1999

== Football ==
=== Clubs ===
Clubs contest the Clare Senior Football Championship. That competition's most successful club is Kilrush Shamrocks, with 21 titles.

=== County team ===
Clare has won two Munster Senior Football Championship (SFC) titles.

Clare won its first Munster SFC in 1917, defeating Cork on a scoreline of 5–4 to 0–1. This was after losing deciders in 1912 and 1915 to Kerry and in 1916 to Cork. Clare then faced Galway in the 1917 All-Ireland Senior Football Championship (SFC) semi-final and won by a scoreline of 2–1 to 0–5. However, in the 1917 All-Ireland Senior Football Championship Final, Clare narrowly lost to Wexford by a scoreline of 0–9 to 0–5. A low point for the county team was the so-called "Milltown Massacre" in 1979. During a game played in Milltown Malbay, Clare lost to Kerry by a scoreline of 1–9 to 9–21, a difference of 35 points. Clare football's greatest day since 1917 arrived in 1992 when, under the stewardship of Mayo native John Maughan, the county won its second Munster SFC by defeating Kerry in the final at the Gaelic Grounds in Limerick by a scoreline of 2–10 to 0–12. This victory was aided in no small part by two second half goals from Colm Clancy and Martin Daly. This victory was also historic in that it is the only year from 1936 to 2020 (when Tipperary won) that neither Kerry nor Cork won the Munster SFC. Clare's luck would run out however and in the 1992 All-Ireland SFC semi-final, the team lost to Dublin by a scoreline of 3–14 to 2–12. Full back on the team of 1992 was Seamus Clancy, brother of full-forward Colm, and he was rewarded for his performances in the 1992 championship with a place on the All-Star team of that year.

== Peil na mBan ==
Clare have the following achievements.

All-Ireland Championship

- All-Ireland Junior Ladies' Football Championship: 2
  - 1991, 1996
- All-Ireland Intermediate Ladies' Football Championship: 3
  - 1991, 1994, 2009
- All-Ireland Under-18 Ladies' Football Championship: 2
  - 1989, 1990
- All-Ireland Under-16 Ladies' Football Championship: 4
  - 1985, 1987, 1990, 1994

Provincial Championship

- Munster Senior Ladies' Football Championship: 1
  - 2001
- Munster Junior Ladies' Football Championship: 6
  - 1988, 1989, 1990, 1991, 1996, 2006

National League

- Ladies' Football National league: 1
  - 2001
- Ladies' Football National League Div 2: 4
  - 1990, 1991, 2000, 2008
- Ladies' Football National League Div 3: 1
  - 2008
