= 2009 Cork county hurling team season =

Cork county hurling team
2009 season
Managers	Gerald McCarthy; John Considine
- All-Ireland SHC
- Munster SHC
- National League
- Top scorer
- Highest SHC attendance
- Lowest SHC attendance
Standard colours

The 2009 season was the Cork senior hurling team's 122nd consecutive season appearing in the Championship, and their 78th season appearing in the National Hurling League. The season has, for a second year running, began badly as the hurling panel withdrew their services because their confidence in manager Gerald McCarthy has been eroded.

== Panel statistics ==
=== Management teams ===
Position	Name	Club	Personal Information
Manager	Gerald McCarthy	St. Finbarr's	Winner of 5 All-Ireland medals with Cork and All-Ireland-winning captain (1966)
Selector	Ger FitzGerald	Midleton	Winner of 2 All-Ireland medals with Cork
Selector	Teddy McCarthy	Sarsfield's	Only player to win All-Ireland medals in both hurling and football in the same year
Selector	Johnny Keane	Liscarroll	Managed Cork to All-Ireland intermediate titles in 2004 and 2006
Selector	John Mortell	Ballyhea	

Following the resignation of Gerald McCarthy and his selectors, the following management team was put in place on a temporary basis on 12 March 2009.

Position	Name	Club	Personal Information
Manager	John Considine	Sarsfield's	Winner of 1 All-Ireland medal with Cork
Selector	Jim Cashman	Blackrock	Winner of 2 All-Ireland medals with Cork
Selector	Tony O'Sullivan	Na Piarsaigh	Winner of 3 All-Ireland medals with Cork
Selector	Denis Ring	Fermoy	
Selector	Paddy Daly	Ballymartle	

=== Hurling panel ===
No.	Pos.	Name	Club	Championship		NHL	
No.	Pos.	Name	Club	Apps	Score	Apps	Score
1	GK	Alan Kennedy	Sarsfield's	0	0-00	3	0-00
2	RCB	Eoin Clancy	Fermoy	0	0-00	2	0-00
3	FB	Chris Murphy	Blackrock	0	0-00	3	0-00
4	LCB	Conor O'Sullivan	Sarsfield's	0	0-00	3	0-00
5	RWB	Eoin Keane	St. Finbarr's	0	0-00	3	0-00
6	CB	Ray Ryan	Sarsfield's	0	0-00	3	0-00
7	LWB	Craig Leahy	Sarsfield's	0	0-00	3	0-00
8	MD	Barry Johnson	Bride Rovers	0	0-00	3	1-15
9	MD	Glenn O'Connor	St. Finbarr's	0	0-00	3	0-01
10	RWF	Tadgh Óg Murphy	Sarsfield's	0	0-00	3	0-05
11	CF	Aidan Ryan	Midleton	0	0-00	3	0-01
12	LWF	Darren Crowley	Bandon	0	0-00	3	0-01
13	RCF	Adrian Mannix	Kilworth	0	0-00	3	0-04
14	FF	Michael Collins	Bride Rovers	0	0-00	3	0-01
15	LCF	Eoghan Cronin	Glen Rovers	0	0-00	3	0-03
		Ciarán Cronin	Lisgoold	0	0-00	0	0-00
		Alwyn Kearney	Midleton	0	0-00	1	0-00
		Joe Moran	Carrigaline	0	0-00	3	0-00
		Ger O'Driscoll	Newcestown	0	0-00	3	0-01
		Tony Murphy	Carrigaline	0	0-00	3	0-01
		Robert O'Driscoll	Sarsfield's	0	0-00	2	0-01
		Paudie Lynch	Kilworth	0	0-00	0	0-00
		Colin O'Leary	Blackrock	0	0-00	0	0-00
		Cian McCarthy	Sarsfield's	0	0-00	3	0-00
		Stephen White		0	0-00	1	1-00

== Waterford Crystal Cup game ==
11 January
Quarter-final

Cork	0-9 – 0-14	Waterford IT
B. Johnson 0-7 (0-6 fs), D. Crowley and R. O’Driscoll 0-1 each	Report	T. Hammersley (0-4); J. Gahan, R. McCarthy (0-3); F. O’Leary (0-2), R. McLoughney (f), S. Lillis (f) 0-1 each

Páirc Uí Rinn, Cork
Referee: G. Hoey (Clare)

== National League games ==
8 February
Round 1

Cork	1-14 – 4-14	Dublin
B Johnson 1-6 (1-0 pen, 0-4f, 0-1 ‘65’), A Mannix 0-2, G O’Connor, A Ryan, D Crowley, M Collins, E Cronin, G O’Driscoll 0-1 each	Report	A McCrabbe 1-9 (1-0 sideline, 0-4f, 0-1 ‘65’), L Rushe 2-1, J Kelly 1-0, D O’Reilly, D O’Callaghan, D Treacy, J McCaffrey 0-1 each

Páirc Uí Chaoimh, Cork

14 February
Round 2

Tipperary	2-15 – 0-9	Cork
P Bourke 0-6 (5f), J O'Brien 1-1, P Maher 1-0, J Woodlock, S Hennessy 0-2 each, J Devane, S Maher, P Kelly, G Ryan 0-1 each	Report	B Johnson 0-7 (5f), T Og Murphy 0-2

Semple Stadium, Thurles
Referee: M. Wadding (Waterford)

1 March
Round 3

Cork	1-11 – 4-16	Galway
S White 1-0; T Óg Murphy, 0-3; A Mannix (1f), B Johnson (1f), E Cronin, 0-2 each; Tony Murphy, R O’Driscoll 0-1 each	Report	A Callinan, 2-1; D Tierney, 1-2; G Farragher, 0-4 (3f, 1‘65); N Healy, 0-4 (1f); C Donnellan, 1-1; K Hynes, A Cullinane, E Forde & A Coen 0-1 each

Páirc Uí Chaoimh, Cork
Referee: G. Hoey (Clare)

22 March
Round 4

Clare	0-16 – 2-14	Cork
C Ryan 0-8 (0-6f, 0-1 65); J Clancy 0-2; P Vaughan, B Nugent, T Griffin, N Gilligan, T Carmody, D McMahon, 0-1 each	Report	B O’Connor 1-9 (1-0 sideline, 0-8f); P Horgan 1-1 (1-0f); K Murphy (Sars), K Murphy (Erin’s Own), N McCarthy, C Naughton, 0-1 each

Cusack Park, Ennis
Referee: A. Kelly (Galway)

29 March
Round 5

Cork	0-00 – 0-00	Limerick

Páirc Uí Chaoimh, Cork
