= List of Cork county hurling team seasons =

Season	All-Ireland Championship	Munster Championship	National Hurling League	Top SHC scorer	Coach(es)
1926	Winner	Winner	Winner		
1927	Runner-up	Winner			
1928	Runner-up	Winner	Group stage		
1929	Winner	Winner	Runner-up		
1930		Semi-finalist	Winner		
1931	Winner	Winner	Group stage		
1932		Runner-up	Group stage		
1933		Semi-finalist	Group stage		
1934		Semi-finalist	Group stage		
1935		Semi-finalist	Group stage		
1936		Quarter-finalist	Runner-up		
1937		Semi-finalist	Group stage		
1938		Semi-finalist	Group stage		
1939	Runner-up	Winner	Group stage		
1940		Runner-up	Winner		
1941	Winner	Runner-up	Winner		
1942	Winner	Winner			
1943	Winner	Winner			
1944	Winner	Winner			
1945		Semi-finalist			
1946	Winner	Winner	Group stage		
1947	Runner-up	Winner	Group stage		
1948		Runner-up	Winner		
1949		Quarter-finalist	Runner-up		
1950		Runner-up	Group stage		
1951		Runner-up	Group stage		
1952	Winner	Winner	Group stage		
1953	Winner	Winner	Winner		
1954	Winner	Winner	Group stage		
1955		Quarter-finalist	Group stage		
1956	Runner-up	Winner	Group stage		
1957		Runner-up	Group stage		
1958		Runner-up	Group stage		
1959		Runner-up	Group stage		
1960		Runner-up	Runner-up		
1961		Runner-up	Group stage		
1962		Semi-finalist	Runner-up		
1963		Semi-finalist	Group stage		
1964		Runner-up	Semi-finalist	Ritchie Browne (4-0)	
1965		Runner-up	Group stage	John Bennett (1-10)	
1966	Winner	Winner	Semi-finalist	Seánie Barry (3-23)	
1967		Quarter-final	Group stage	Seánie Barry (0-5)	
1968		Runner-up	Semi-finalist	Charlie McCarthy (1-12)	
1969	Runner-up	Winner	Winner	Charlie McCarthy (6-13)	
1970	Winner	Winner	Winner	Charlie McCarthy (1-23)	
1971		Semi-finalist	Semi-finalist	Connie Kelly (0-7)	
1972	Runner-up	Winner	Winner	Charlie McCarthy (4-33)	
1973		Semi-finalist	Group stage	Gerald McCarthy (0-8)	
1974		Quarter-finalist	Winner	Charlie McCarthy (1-4)	
1975	Semi-finalist	Winner	Group stage	Charlie McCarthy (4-9)	
1976	Winner	Winner	Semi-finalist	Charlie McCarthy (3-8)	Fr. Bertie Troy
1977	Winner	Winner	Group stage	Charlie McCarthy (1-17)	Fr. Bertie Troy
1978	Winner	Winner	Group stage	Charlie McCarthy (0-14)	Fr. Bertie Troy
1979	Semi-finalist	Winner	Group stage	Charlie McCarthy (1-12)	Fr. Bertie Troy
1980		Runner-up	Winner	John Fenton (0-13)	Fr. Bertie Troy
1981		Semi-finialist	Winner	Jimmy Barry-Murphy (1-1); Tim Crowley (1-1)	Gerald McCarthy
1982	Runner-up	Winner	Semi-finalist	Pádraig Horan (5-17)	Gerald McCarthy
1983	Runner-up	Winner	Group stage	Billy Fitzpatrick (1-24)	Johnny Clifford
1984	Winner	Winner	Group stage	John Fenton (1-33)	Fr. Michael O'Brien; Justin McCarthy
1985	Semi-finalist	Winner	Group stage	John Fenton (4-12)	Fr. Michael O'Brien; Justin McCarthy
1986	Winner	Winner	Semi-finalist	Jimmy Barry-Murphy (5-5); Kevin Hennessy (5-5)	Johnny Clifford
1987		Runner-up	Group stage	John Fenton (1-38)	Johnny Clifford
1988		Runner-up	Group stage	Pat Horgan (2-10)	Johnny Clifford; Charlie McCarthy; Con Roche
1989		Semi-finalist	Group stage	Finbarr Delaney (1-19)	Con Roche
1990	Winner	Winner	Semi-finalist	John Fitzgibbon (7-9)	Fr. Michael O'Brien
1991		Runner-up	Group stage	Tony O'Sullivan (0-15)	Fr. Michael O'Brien
1992	Runner-up	Winner	Group stage	Tony O'Sullivan (0-31)	Fr. Michael O'Brien
1993		Semi-final	Winner	Barry Egan (0-3)	Fr. Michael O'Brien
1994		Quarter-final	Semi-finalist	Kevin Murray (2-0)	Johnny Clifford
1995		Quarter-final	Group stage	Kevin Murray (1-6)	Johnny Clifford
1996		Quarter-final	Group stage	Alan Browne (1-1)	Jimmy Barry-Murphy
1997		Semi-final	Group stage	Ger Manley (0-6)	Jimmy Barry-Murphy
1998		Semi-final	Winner	Joe Deane (0-14)	Jimmy Barry-Murphy
1999	Winner	Winner	Group stage	Joe Deane (1-24)	Jimmy Barry-Murphy
2000	Semi-finalist	Winner	Group stage	Joe Deane (1-28)	Jimmy Barry-Murphy
2001		Quarter-final	Group stage	Alan Browne (1-2)	Tom Cashman
2002	Qualifiers (Round 3)	Semi-final	Runner-up	Ben O'Connor (0-14)	Bertie Óg Murphy
2003	Runner-up	Winner	Round 8	Joe Deane	Dónal O'Grady
2004	Winner	Runner-up	Group stage	Ben O'Connor (1-26)	Dónal O'Grady
2005	Winner	Winner	Group stage	Joe Deane (0-32)	John Allen
2006	Runner-up	Winner	Group stage	Joe Deane (0-32)	John Allen
2007	Quarter-finalist	Semi-finalist	Semi-finalist	Joe Deane (0-35)	Gerald McCarthy
2008	Semi-finalist	Quarter-finalist	Semi-finalist	Ben O'Connor (1-32)	Gerald McCarthy
2009	Qualifiers (Phase 3)	Quarter-finalist	Group stage	Ben O'Connor (0-24)	Gerald McCarthy; John Considine; Denis Walsh
2010	Semi-finalists	Runner-up	Runner-up		Denis Walsh
2011	Qualifiers (Phase 3)	Quarter-finalist	Group stage	Patrick Horgan (3-38)	Denis Walsh
2012	Semi-finalist	Semi-finalist	Runner-up	Patrick Horgan (1-42)	Jimmy Barry-Murphy
2013	Runner-up	Runner-up	Relegated	Patrick Horgan (1-42)	Jimmy Barry-Murphy
