= 2008 Cork county hurling team season =

Cork county hurling team
2008 season
Manager	Gerald McCarthy
All-Ireland SHC	Semi-finalist
Munster SHC	Semi-finalist
National League	Semi-finalist
Top scorer	Ben O'Connor (1-32)
Highest SHC attendance	71,235 vs Kilkenny
Lowest SHC attendance	12,616 vs Dublin
Standard colours

The 2008 season was the Cork senior hurling team's 121st consecutive season appearing in the Championship, and their 77th season appearing in the National Hurling League. After losing to Waterford in both the Munster and All-Ireland championships the previous year, Cork were out to make amends for these shortcomings. The season began badly as both Cork Gaelic football team went on strike due to the withdrawal of the right of the manager to pick his own selectors. The Cork hurling panel also withdrew their services in sympathy, resulting in a less than impressive start to the hurling campaign. The 2008 season was ultimately seen as a failure as Cork failed to reach the final of any competition.

== Panel statistics ==
=== Management team ===
Position	Name	Club	Personal Information
Manager	Gerald McCarthy	St. Finbarr's	Winner of 5 All-Ireland medals with Cork and All-Ireland-winning captain (1966)
Selector	Martin Bowen	Erin's Own	Managed Erin's Own to consecutive county titles in 2006 and 2007
Selector	Donie Collins	Blackrock	Winner of a record 4 All-Ireland club medals (with Blackrock and James Stephens)
Selector	Ger FitzGerald	Midleton	Winner of 2 All-Ireland medals with Cork
Selector	John Mortell	Ballyhea	
Trainer	Jerry Wallis	Midleton	

=== Hurling panel ===
No.	Pos.	Name	Club	Championship		NHL	
No.	Pos.	Name	Club	Apps	Score	Apps	Score
1	GK	Dónal Óg Cusack	Cloyne	5	0-00	4	0-00
2	RCB	Shane O'Neill	Bishopstown	5	0-00	6	0-00
3	FB	Diarmuid O'Sullivan	Cloyne	5	0-00	4	0-00
4	LCB	Brian Murphy	Bride Rovers	5	0-00	4	0-00
5	RWB	John Gardiner (c)	Na Piarsaigh	5	0-04	5	0-14
6	CB	Ronan Curran	St. Finbarr's	5	0-00	1	0-00
7	LWB	Seán Óg Ó hAilpín	Na Piarsaigh	4	0-01	4	0-01
8	MD	Tom Kenny	Grenagh	5	0-06	6	0-08
9	MD	Jerry O'Connor	Newtownshandrum	5	0-06	0	0-00
10	RWF	Ben O'Connor	Newtownshandrum	5	1-32	5	0-24
11	CF	Niall McCarthy	Carrigtwohill	5	0-03	2	0-00
12	LWF	Pa Cronin	Bishopstown	5	0-04	3	0-12
13	RCF	Cathal Naughton	Newtownshandrum	5	0-12	5	1-10
14	FF	Joe Deane	Killeagh	5	1-6	2	0-00
15	WCF	Patrick Horgan	Glen Rovers	4	0-06	3	0-07
16	GK	Anthony Nash	Kanturk	0	0-00	1	0-00
17	RCB	Shane Murphy	Erin's Own	0	0-00	5	0-00
18		John O'Callaghan	Inniscarra	0	0-00	0	0-00
19	LCB	Cian O'Connor	Erin's Own	0	0-00	3	0-00
20	RWB	Eoin Cadogan	Douglas	0	0-00	5	0-00
21	CB	Ciaran McGann	Castlelyons	0	0-00	3	0-01
22	LWB	Kevin Hartnett	Russel Rovers	0	0-00	6	0-01
23	LWF	Timmy McCarthy	Castlelyons	5	1-01	4	0-03
24	RWF	Kieran 'Hero' Murphy	Erin's Own	0	0-00	4	0-00
25	GK	Martin Coleman, Jnr	Ballinhassig	1	0-00	1	0-00
26	CF	Kevin Canty	Valley Rovers	1	0-00	4	0-06
27	FF	Brian Corry	Ballinhassig	1	0-01	6	1-06
28	LCF	Kieran 'Fraggie' Murphy	Sarsfield's	0	0-00	0	0-00
29	FF	Neil Ronan	Ballyhea	3	0-05	2	2-14
30	RCF	Paudie O'Sullivan	Cloyne	2	0-01	2	0-04
	MD	Stephen White	Ballygarvan	0	0-00	3	0-01
	RWF	Leigh Desmond	Youghal	0	0-00	4	0-05
	FF	Fintan O'Leary	Ballinhassig	0	0-00	3	2-00

== Waterford Crystal Cup games ==
10 January
Quarter-final

Limerick Institute of Technology	w/o from	Cork

== National League games ==
10 February
Round 1

Kilkenny	w/o from	Cork

Páirc Uí Chaoimh, Cork

17 February
Round 2

Waterford	w/o from	Cork

Páirc Uí Chaoimh, Cork

9 March
Round 3

Cork	3-18 – 2-16	Dublin
N. Ronan 2-4; F. O’Leary 1-0; J. Gardiner 0-3 (1 f, 1 65), T. Kenny 0-3; P. Cronin, B. Corry and P. Horgan 0-2 each; T. McCarthy and K. McGann 0-1 each	Report	S. Mullen 0-7 (6 fs); D. O’Callaghan 0-5 (2 fs); K. Flynn and P. Kelly 1-0 each; D. O’Dwyer 0-2; J. McCaffrey and R. O’Carroll 0-1 each

Parnell Park, Dublin
Referee: S. Whelan (Wexford)

16 March
Round 4

Cork	1-24 – 1-7	Antrim
P Cronin 0-6 (frees); K Canty 0-5; J Gardiner 0-3 (2f, 1 65); B O’Connor 0-3 (1f); C Naughton 0-3; B Corry 1-0; T Kenny 0-2; K Hartnett 0-1; L Desmond 0-1	Report	L Watson 1-1 (0-1f); K McKeegan 0-1f; S McCrory 0-1 P McGill 0-1; K Stewart 0-1; B Quinn 0-1; P Shiels 0-1

Casement Park, Belfast
Referee: A. Stapleton (Laois)

23 March
Round 5

Cork	0-22 – 1-17	Wexford
N. Ronan 0-10 (0-7 frees); C. Naughton 0-3 (0-1 free); J. Gardiner 0-3 frees; T. McCarthy 0-2; K. Canty, S. O’Neill, B. Corry and P. Horgan 0-1 each	Report	R. Jacob 1-4; S. Nolan 0-4 (0-3 frees); D. Stamp 0-3; P.J. Nolan 0-2; T. Dwyer, C. Farrell, D. Lynch and S. Doyle 0-1 each

Páirc Uí Chaoimh, Cork
Referee: G. Hoey (Clare)

30 March
Play-off

Cork	2-17 – 1-19	Waterford
B. O’Connor 0-8 (0-6 frees); L. Desmond 0-4; P. Horgan 0-4 (all frees); C. Naughton 1-0; F. O’Leary 1-0; S. White 0-1	Report	S. Prendergast 1-3; J. Mullane 0-5; E. Kelly 0-5 (0-4 frees); M. Walsh 0-2; S. O’Sullivan 0-2; E. McGrath 0-2

Walsh Park, Waterford
Referee: J. Ryan (Tipperary)

6 April
Quarter-final

Cork	0-13 – 0-8	Limerick
B. O’Connor 0-5 frees; B. Corry 0-3; J. Gardiner 0-2 (0-1 free, 0-1 ‘65); C. Naughton 0-2; S. Óg Ó hAilpín 0-1	Report	A. O’Shaughnessy 0-4 (0-3 frees); N. Moran, S. O’Connor, P. Tobin and D. O’Grady 0-1 each

Gaelic Grounds, Limerick
Referee: B. Kelly (Westmeath)

13 April
Semi-final

Cork	0-24 – 2-22	Galway
B. O’Connor 0-8 (0-6 frees, 0-1 sideline); P. O’Sullivan and P. Cronin 0-4 each; J. Gardiner (0-1free) and T. Kenny 0-3 each; C. Naughton 0-2	Report	G. Farragher 1-5 (1-3 frees); I. Tannian 1-2; J. Canning 0-4 (0-1 sideline); D. Hayes 0-4; N. Healy 0-3; K. Hynes, A. Cullinane, R. Murray and E. Lynch 0-1 each

Gaelic Grounds, Limerick
Referee: J. Owens

== Championship games ==
=== Vs Tipperary ===
8 June
Semi-final

Cork	1-13 - 1-19	Tipperary
B O'Connor 1-3 (2f), C Naughton 0-4, J O'Connor 0-2, S Óg Ó hAilpín, P O'Sullivan, T Kenny, B Corry 0-1 each.	Report	E Kelly 1-7 (5f), L Corbett 0-4, S Callinan 0-3, E Corcoran (sl), W Ryan, S McGrath, P Kerwick, M Webster 0-1 each.

Páirc Uí Chaoimh, Cork
Referee: B Kelly (Westmeath)

Tipperary created history at Páirc Uí Chaoimh on this occasion as they won their county's first championship match in Cork since 1923. A Ben O'Connor goal and three Cathal Naughton points had Cork leading by 1-08 to 0-04 but Tipp, thanks to a dominant spell late in the half, only trailed by 1-08 to 1-07 at half-time. Tipp, taking their unbeaten run this season to 11 wins and two draws, scored eight of the game's final nine points to power to victory. Team captain Eoin Kelly rocketed home a goal in the 24th minute, leaving his marker Brian Murphy and goalkeeper Donal Óg Cusack gasping. Kelly finished with a personal tally of 1-07 and was ably assisted by Lar Corbett (0-04) and championship debutant Séamus Callinan (0-03).

=== Vs Dublin ===
12 July
Phase 3

Cork	1-17 - 0-15	Dublin
J Deane 1-1, C Naughton 0-3, T Kenny, J O'Connor, B O'Connor (1f), N Ronan 0-2 each, J Gardiner (1f), E Cadogan, N McCarthy, P Cronin, P Horgan 0-1 each.	Report	D O'Callaghan 0-10 (7f), R O'Carroll 0-3, P Ryan 0-2.

Páirc Uí Chaoimh, Cork
Referee: J. Owens (Wexford)

An opportunistic goal from Joe Deane proved crucial at Páirc Uí Chaoimh as Cork fended off a wholehearted Dublin side to progress to the fourth round of the All-Ireland SHC qualifiers. The Rebels, who had an early wind advantage, were 0-10 to 0-06 ahead at half-time with free-taker David O'Callaghan (0-05) top-scoring for the Dubs. Not many observers would have predicted such a hard-fought game as 'the Dubs' proved once again that they can live with the top-tier counties.

=== Vs Galway ===
19 July
Phase 4

Galway	2-15 - 0-23	Cork
J Canning 2-12, N Healy, D Hayes, R Murray 0-1 each.	Report	B O’Connor 0-12, J Deane 0-4, C Naughton 0-3, J Gardiner 0-2, N McCarthy, P Horgan 0-1 each.

Semple Stadium, Thurles
Referee: B Kelly (Westmeath)

Facing each other in the Championship for the first time since the 2005 All-Ireland final, this was a game that both Cork and Galway's seasons rested upon and quite possibly the futures of their respective managers. Ger Loughnane's side got off to a poor start, going 0-04 to 0-00 behind with the Cork forwards all on target. Ten minutes in however, Joe Canning got Galway into contention as he shrugged off the challenge of Diarmuid O'Sullivan and sneaked a stunning shot past Dónal Óg Cusack for his first goal. Some time later a swift Galway attack ended with Alan Kerins batting the sliotar to the Cork net but referee Barry Kelly had already blown his whistle before the goal was scored. Kelly penalised Cork 'keeper Cusack for a foul on Kerins. The foul earned Cusack his second yellow card, Cork were suddenly down to 14 men and they had a penalty to defend. After converting the penalty Canning had 2-04 to show for the first 35 minutes. In the second-half Galway struggled to pull away and Cork managed to heap the pressure on them with a run of six successive points. Loughnane's team threw everything they had at their opponents in the closing ten minutes. Canning tried his heart out, firing over three late points but Ben O'Connor had the last word when he split the posts with a superb effort from near the sideline.

=== Vs Clare ===
27 July
Quarter-final

Clare	2-17 - 2-19	Cork
N Gilligan 0-8 (3f, 1 '65'), D Mc Mahon, B Nugent 1-1 each, J Clancy, T Carmody 0-2 each, G Quinn (1f), P Donnellan, B O'Connell (sl) 0-1 each.	Report	B O'Connor 0-7 (3f, 1 '65'), T McCarthy, K Murphy 1-0 each, P Horgan 0-3, P Cronin, N Ronan 0-2 each, T Kenny, J O'Connor, N McCarthy, C Naughton, J Deane 0-1 each.

Semple Stadium, Thurles
Referee: D Murphy (Wexford)

For the third weekend in-a-row Cork faced a win-or-bust championship game. A feature of the opening quarter was Cork full-back Diarmuid O'Sullivan's struggle to keep tabs on the elusive Niall Gilligan. Wides blighted Clare's play in the Munster final and wayward shooting was again threatening to derail them on this occasion. The tempo of the game increased as Barry Nugent turned onto his right and pointed. A brace of points came from Pat Donnellan and Clare then turned on the afterburners to score 1-04 without reply. Eight points in arrears and staring at an embarrassing championship exit, half-time came at just the right time for Cork. Just as they did when they were in trouble at the break in the Galway game, Cork rallied superbly with a brilliant second half performance. Incredibly, the deficit was back to just four points - 1-11 to 1-07 - within three minutes of the restart. Timmy McCarthy followed up with a timely goal. A short while later Clare were just about keeping Cork at arm's length. As the clock ticked towards 70 minutes, Cork never really looked assured. Searching for that levelling point, Clare were left wanting. It was left to Neil Ronan to confirm crestfallen Clare's exit from the championship as he landed the insurance point in the 72nd minute.

=== Vs Kilkenny ===
10 August
Semi-final

Kilkenny	1-23 - 0-17	Cork
H Shefflin 0-11 (6f), E Larkin 1-2, A Fogarty 0-5, TJ Reid 0-2, R Power, E Brennan, J Fitzpatrick 0-1 each.	Report	B O'Connor 0-8 (8f), N McCarthy, T Kenny, J O'Connor 0-2 each, C Naughton, J Gardiner, P Cronin 0-1 each.

Croke Park, Dublin
Referee: M Wadding (Waterford)

In a unique fixture Cork's All-Ireland semi-final meeting with Kilkenny was the first time in the history of the championship that both sides met outside of the All-Ireland final. Kilkenny were hoping for a victory to keep their three-in-a-row dream on track, while Cork were hoping to deny 'the Cats' a spot in the championship decider and a chance to go one ahead of Cork in the all-time roll of honour. The game began evenly enough and the sides were level six times in the opening twenty-one minutes. Just on the half-hour mark Eoin Larkin found himself in space for a Kilkenny goal to give his side a 1-09 to 0-06 lead. While Cork came back for a brief time in the second half, the deadly accuracy of Henry Shefflin made sure that a victory for 'the Cats' was always going to be the outcome. The nearest Cork came to closing the gap in the second half was to make it a five-point margin. But a great point by Martin Comerford showed that Kilkenny were ready to step up a further gear as they swept to a comprehensive win.
