= 2007 Waterford Crystal Cup =

- Dates: 14 January 2006 – 4 February 2006
- Teams: 11
- Champions: Tipperary (1st title)
- Runners-up: Cork

Tournament statistics
- Matches played: 10
- Goals scored: 24 (2.4 per match)
- Points scored: 253 (25.3 per match)

The 2007 Waterford Crystal Cup was the second staging of the Waterford Crystal Cup. The cup began on 14 January 2007 and ended on 4 February 2007.

Limerick were the defending champions but were defeated by the Limerick Institute of Technology in the preliminary round.

On 4 February 2007, Tipperary won the cup following a 1–17 to 2–11 defeat of Cork in the final. This was their first Waterford Crystal Cup title.

== Results ==
Preliminary round

14 January 2007 Preliminary round	Clare	1-16 - 1-13	University College Cork	Hennessy Memorial Park
	D Quinn 1-4, D O’Rourke 0-4, K Dilleen 0-2, C Lafferty 0-2, P Vaughan 0-1, T Kearse 0-1, A Quinn 0-1, J Cusack 0-1.		E Murphy 1-8, S Cronin 0-1, S O’Neill 0-1, K Hartnett 0-1, P Cronin 0-1, J Halbert 0-1.	Referee: J O'Mahony (Limerick)

14 January 2007 Preliminary round	Limerick	0-12 - 2-12	Limerick Institute of Technology	FitzGerald Park, Kilmallock
	S O’Connor 0-2, M Fitzgerald 0-2, A O’Shaughnessy 0-2, B Foley 0-2, D O’Grady 0-1, M O’Brien 0-1, P Tobin 0-1, P Lawlor 0-1.		J Canning 1-5, B Gaffney 1-0, J Clancy 0-2, K Murphy 0-2, B Earley 0-2, I Tannian 0-1.	Referee: B While (Tipperary)

14 January 2007 Preliminary round	Tipperary	1-13 - 1-11	University of Limerick	MacDonagh Park
	P Kelly 0-5, D O’Halloran 1-1, P Bourke 0-3, T Scrope 0-2, L Corbett 0-1.		A Egan 1-4, A Ó Cairealláin 0-2, P O’Flynn 0-1, B Bugler 0-1, R Ruth 0-1, T Stapleton 0-1, R O’Dwyer 0-1.

Quarter-finals

21 January 2007 Quarter-final	Waterford	2-14 - 1-16 (aet)	Limerick Institute of Technology	Fraher Field, Dungarvan
	E Kelly (1-5); K McGrath (1-4); J Hartley (0-2); J Kennedy, D Shanahan. C Carey (0-1) each.	Report	B Earley (0-7); I Tannian(1-1); C O’Mahony (0-2); E Cadogan (0-2); S McGrath, A Murphy, R Sherlock, K Murphy (0-1) each.	Referee: S Roche (Tipperary)

21 January 2007 Quarter-final	Cork	2-20 - 1-11	Cork Institute of Technology	Páirc Uí Chaoimh, Cork
	N. Ronan 0-8 (0-5 frees); J. O’Callaghan and K. Murphy 0-4 each; D. O’Sullivan and C. Cusack 1-0 each; C. McGann 0-2; M. O’Connell and K. Canty 0-1 each.		J. Hurney 1-1; J. Griffin 0-3; C. Naughton 0-2; M. O’Sullivan 0-2 (0-1 free); B. Ring, B. Corry and L. Desmond 0-1 each.	Referee: M Wadding (Waterford)

21 January 2007 Quarter-final	Kerry	0-6 - 1-5	Clare	Lerrig
	S Brick 0-4, B O'Sullivan 0-1, M Conway.	Report	D Quinn 1-2, C Lafferty 0-1, T Kearse 0-1, D Shannon 0-1.

21 January 2007 Quarter-final	Tipperary	2-18 - 0-5	Waterford Institute of Technology	MacDonagh Park
	P. Kelly 1-2, E. Shinnors 1-0, E. Kelly 0-8 (0-4f), L. Corbett 0-2, P. Bourke 0-2, T. Scroope 0-1, S. Maher, M. Webster 0-1 each.	Report	J. Dalton 0-2 (0-1 f, 0-1 65), L. Lawlor, D. Hoctor, M. Gorman (f) 0-1 each.	Referee: C McAllister (Cork)

Semi-finals

28 January 2007 Semi-final	Clare	1-14 - 3-14	Tipperary	Meelick Sportsfield
	D Quinn 0-4, A Quinn 0-4, D O'Rourke 0-4, P Vaughan 1-0, D Shannon 0-1, K Dilleen 0-1.	Report	E Kelly (1-5, 1-2 frees, 0-1 '65), S Lillis (1-0), M Webster (1-0), P Bourke (0-3), T Scroope (0-2), L Corbett (0-2), P Kelly (0-1), D Hickey (0-1).	Referee: C McAllister (Cork)

28 January 2007 Semi-final	Waterford	2-9 - 0-16	Cork	Fraher Field, Dungarvan
	K McGrath (1-1, frees); M Walsh (1-1); E Kelly (0-3, frees); S Prendergast (0-2); J Murray, J Mullane (0-1) each.	Report	N Ronan (0-10, 0-9 frees); K Murphy (0-2); T Kenny (0- 2); T McCarthy, N McCarthy (0-1) each.	Referee: J Ryan (Tipperary)

Final

4 February 2007 Final	Cork	2-11 - 1-17	Tipperary	Páirc Uí Chaoimh, Cork
	J O'Callaghan (1-3), J Deane (0-4, three frees), D O'Sullivan (1-0), N McCarthy (0-3), C McGann (0-1).	Report	E Kelly (0-9, five frees, one 65), D O'Hanlon (1-1), P Kelly (0-4), T Scroope (0-1), D Egan (0-1), L Corbett (0-1).	Referee: A Heagney (Clare)

== Top scorers ==
Overall

Rank	Player	County	Tally	Total	Matches	Average
1	Eoin Kelly	Tipperary	1-22	25	4	6.25
2	Neil Ronan	Cork	0-18	18	2	9.00
3	Derek Quinn	Clare	2-10	16	3	5.33

Single game

Rank	Player	County	Tally	Total	Opposition
1	Eoghan Murphy	University College Cork	1-8	11	Clare
2	Neil Ronan	Cork	0-10	10	Waterford
3	Eoin Kelly	Tipperary	0-9	9	Cork
4	Eoin Kelly	Tipperary	1-5	8	Clare
4	Joe Canning	Limerick Institute of Technology	1-5	8	Limerick
4	Eoin Kelly	Tipperary	0-8	8	Waterford Institute of Technology
4	Eoin Kelly	Waterford	1-5	8	Limerick Institute of Technology
4	Neil Ronan	Cork	0-8	8	Cork Institute of Technology
9	Derek Quinn	Clare	1-4	7	University College Cork
9	Alan Egan	University of Limerick	1-4	7	Tipperary
9	B. Earley	Limerick Institute of Technology	0-7	7	Waterford
