= Cork county hurling team =

Hurling team in Ireland

Cork
- Sport: Hurling
- Irish: Corcaigh
- Nickname(s): The Rebels; The Leesiders; The Blood and Bandage
- County board: Cork GAA
- Manager: Ben O'Connor
- Captain: Darragh Fitzgibbon
- Home venue(s): Páirc Uí Chaoimh, Cork

Recent competitive record
- Current All-Ireland status: SF in 2026
- Last championship title: 2005
- Current NHL Division: 1A (2nd in 2026)
- Last league title: 2025
First colours	Second colours

The Cork county hurling team represents Cork in hurling and is governed by Cork GAA, the county board of the Gaelic Athletic Association. The team competes in the three major annual inter-county competitions: the All-Ireland Senior Hurling Championship, the Munster Senior Hurling Championship, and the National Hurling League.

Cork's home ground is Páirc Uí Chaoimh, Cork. The team's manager is Ben O'Connor.

The team last won the Munster Senior Championship in 2025, the All-Ireland Senior Championship in 2005 and the National League in 2025.

Cork is regarded as one of 'the big three' in hurling, with Kilkenny and Tipperary completing the trinity. The county currently lies second in the all-time roll of honour in terms of All-Ireland SHC titles, having won its 30th in 2005. Cork has also won the Munster SHC title 51 times, more than any other team in the province. Cork occupies second place in the National League roll of honour, after winning its 14th title in 1998. In 1944, Cork won a fourth consecutive All-Ireland SHC title, a record which stood for 65 years until Kilkenny equalled it in 2009. Limerick has recently achieved the same feat 2023

Cork also competes in the Waterford Crystal Cup and contributes players to the Munster Railway Cup team for an annual inter-provincial series of games.

== History ==
=== Early years ===
During its beginning, Cork had been one of the few teams that was interested in fielding a hurling team in the very first All-Ireland championship in 1887; however, a dispute over which team should represent the county led to Cork not taking part at all. The county entered a team in 1888 and went on to win their first All-Ireland title in 1890 when Aughabullogue beat Castlebridge of Wexford.

In the early years of the competition, the various county champions represented their county in the All-Ireland series. However, this changed in 1892 when Cork contested, and won their second All-Ireland final with a team consisting of players from multiple clubs in the county. Further All-Ireland titles in 1893 and 1894 meant Cork became the first team to win a three-in-row. This record would stand until it was later equaled by Kilkenny and Tipperary. Between 1901 and 1905 Cork appeared in five successive All-Ireland finals; however, victory only came in the form of a two-in-a-row in 1902 and 1903. Following this, Cork's hurlers waited sixteen years before their next All-Ireland win in 1919. A further five All-Ireland finals were contested by Cork between 1926 and 1931 with victory coming on four occasions.

=== 1940s ===
The Cork team of the 1940s is regarded as one of the two greatest teams of all time. They are one of only three teams to win four All-Ireland hurling titles in-a-row the Kilkenny team of 2006 to 2009) and the great Limerick team of 2020 to 2023. Many of the team's detractors, however, have questioned the worth of these championship victories as Cork lost the 1941 Munster championship and overcame a Dublin team, and an Antrim team who only got into the final because Kilkenny and Tipperary could not play due to an outbreak of foot and mouth disease. However, the Cork team was defeated in two All-Ireland finals, those of 1939 and 1947. The former has come to be known as the "thunder and lightning final". On the day before World War II broke out, Cork faced a Kilkenny side who were playing in their fourth final in five years. The game saw both sides remaining level for much of the game. Just as the game reached its climax, a crack of thunder interrupted the play and the rain bucketed down. Kilkenny emerged victorious by a single point.

In 1941, an outbreak of foot-and-mouth disease in the midlands forced Tipperary and Kilkenny to withdraw from the competition. As a result, Cork faced Limerick in the Munster final, and defeated them, before beating Dublin in the All-Ireland decider for one of the handiest championships ever won. Following the All-Ireland final, Cork played Tipperary in the delayed Munster final and lost, thus becoming the very first All-Ireland champions but provincial runners-up. For these reasons, Cork's first win of four in-a-row is often dismissed by their opponents.

In 1942 Cork defeated Tipperary in the Munster final and silenced their critics, before going on to claim their second consecutive All-Ireland title by again defeating Dublinn. In 1943, Cork were repeat Munster champions and qualified for the All-Ireland final, where their opponents were expected to be Kilkenny. Kilkenny, however, were defeated by Antrim, a junior team, in the All-Ireland semi-final. Cork went on to record a victory over Antrim in the final and claim a third consecutive All-Ireland victory. In 1944, Cork repeated as Munster champions, defeating Mick Mackey's Limerick side in the decider. They defeated Galway before beating their old enemy Dublin in the final. Cork set a record of four All-Ireland titles in-a-row the first team to do this.

Five All-Ireland titles in-a-row was beyond this Cork team, as they were defeated in the 1945 Munster final. They returned in 1946, however, winning back their Munster crown and defeating Kilkenny in the All-Ireland final. Cork player Christy Ring, at the age of 25, collected his fifth All-Ireland winners medal. In 1947, Cork were playing in their sixth All-Ireland final of the decade. In what has been described as the greatest All-Ireland Hurling Final of all time, Cork were defeated by a single point. This defeat brought an end to the run of success of the Cork team of the 1940s.

=== 1950s ===
Between 1949 and 1951 Cork had met Tipperary every year in the Munster final. Each year, Tipperary had won and went on to claim the All-Ireland title. By 1952, Cork had an extra motivating factor because they realised that if Tipperary beat them again, they would almost certainly win a fourth consecutive All-Ireland title and equal the record set by Cork in the 1940s. At the start of the 1952 championship, Tipperary was favored to retain their All-Ireland crown. It looked like the same old story in the Munster final as Cork conceded a goal after just three minutes of play. A goal for Cork from Mossie O'Riordan was the turning point of the match, however, and Cork ended Tipp's hopes of four in-a-row with a scoreline of 1–11 to 2–7. Christy Ring, who had again proved instrumental in the victory, was shouldered off the field with blood streaming down his face and a bandage around his head. Cork went on to narrowly defeat Galway in the All-Ireland semi-final before hammering Dublin in the final.

In 1953 Cork set out to defend their title. They defeated their old rivals Tipperary in the Munster final and set up a meeting with Galway in the All-Ireland decider. Galway believed that the physical route was the best way to upset Cork and it did. In a low scoring game Cork won by a single point; however, the battle didn't stop at Croke Park. Later that night some of the Galway players arrived at the Gresham Hotel where Cork were staying. A fight broke, with Christy Ring getting a punch in the face and falling down some steps. The melee ended just as quick as it had begun. In 1954 Cork were the favourites to complete another three in-a-row. They defeated Tipp again in the Munster final, before storming past Galway in the All-Ireland semi-final. The Corkmen then advanced to play Wexford in one of the most eagerly anticipated All-Ireland finals ever. Wexford were hotly tipped to spoil Cork's quest for another treble, however, on the day Cork's defence were on top form. They won on a scoreline of 1–9 to 1–6, with Christy Ring becoming the first player to win eight All-Ireland medals.

In 1955 Cork were beaten by Clare in the opening round of the Munster championship, however, they returned for one final swansong in 1956. They regained their Munster crown, courtesy of a hat-trick by Christy Ring, and set up another All-Ireland final showdown with Wexford. It was another classic encounter but sides at their peak. The turing point of the game came when Wexford were two points up. Their goalkeeper, Art Foley, saved a great shot by Christy Ring and cleared the ball. Within seconds Nicky Rackard scored a goal to win the game for Wexford. The final score was 2–14 to 2–8. Ring had been denied his ninth All-Ireland medal. In a show of solidarity Bobby Rackard and Nick O'Donnell of Wexford shouldered Ring off the field. It would be Cork's last All-Ireland final appearance for ten years.

=== Another three-in-a-row ===
In 1966 Cork came from nowhere to win their first Munster title in a decade and advanced to an All-Ireland final decider against Kilkenny. None of the Cork team had ever played in Croke Park before, however, for Kilkenny it was like their home stadium. There was even speculation that Christy Ring, the age of 45, was about to come out of retirement to play for Cork, however, this didn't happen. While Kilkenny were the favourites Gerald McCarthy captained one of the youngest Cork teams ever to victory. Kilkenny had their revenge over Cork in 1969, however, in 1970 Cork captured the Liam MacCarthy Cup with a massive win over Wexford.

The 1970s was to be a glorious decade for Cork's hurlers. In 1975 Cork won their first Munster title since 1972. It was to be the first of five Munster Championship victories in-a-row. An All-Ireland semi-final loss to Galway raised certain doubts over Cork's ability. They silenced their critics in 1976 when Cork faced Wexford in the All-Ireland final. After 8 minutes Cork were in severe trouble, having conceded two goals and two points. It looked as if the game was going to be a repeat of the 1956 final, however, Cork fought back to win what has been referred to as Pat Moylan's All-Ireland final.

In 1977 Cork were back in the All-Ireland final taking on Wexford for the second consecutive year. The game didn't start as quickly as the previous year, however, it was no less as exciting. Cork's captain, Martin O'Doherty, and the team's goalkeeper, Martin Coleman, were the heroes of the day, as Cork won on a scoreline of 1–17 to 3–8. The three-in-a-row was the major talking-point yet again and Cork didn't disappoint, returning to the All-Ireland final. This time their opponents were Kilkenny. They gave Cork a fright when they scored an early goal, however, an opportunistic goal by Cork's Jimmy Barry-Murphy sealed victory for the Leesiders. Sporting history was made. The possibility of completing a famous four-in-a-row looked extremely likely in 1979 when Cork captured their fifth Munster title. A defeat at the All-Ireland semi-final stage by Galway ended Cork's run of success, and brought an end to the careers of many of their most famous players.

=== 1980s ===
Cork reclaimed their Munster Championship crown in 1982. It was the first of five Munster titles in-a-row. They reached the All-Ireland final that year but were defeated by Kilkenny. In 1983 Cork were defeated by "the cats" for the second consecutive year. 1984 was a special year for Gaelic games as it was the centenary year of the Gaelic Athletic Association. Having lost the previous two All-Ireland finals, Cork were even hungrier for success in 1984. The plan nearly came undone in the Munster final when Tipperary were up by four points with four minutes to go. One goal each from Seánie O'Leary and Tony O'Sullivan sealed victory for "the Rebels" and they advanced to an easy win over Offaly in the All-Ireland final at Semple Stadium.

In 1986 Cork were back in the All-Ireland final, this time facing favourites Galway. Cork scored four goals on that day and, in spite of a late goal by Galway's P. J. Molloy, Cork won the day on a scoreline of 4–13 to 2–15.

=== 1990s ===
Four years later in 1990 Cork were again Munster champions before taking part in another final against Galway. Cork returned as the underdogs coming into the final. In one of the most high-scoring finals in years Cork re-emerged victorious with a scoreline of 5–15 to 2-21. The 1990s which started so well were to prove difficult for the Cork hurlers. After losing to Kilkenny in the All-Ireland final in 1992 it would take until 1999 for Cork to re-emerge as Munster and All-Ireland champions. Jimmy Barry-Murphy, coached the youngest Cork team ever to another All-Ireland victory.

=== 1999-present ===
While it was expected that the team would build on the success of 1999, instead it went down a different path. A loss to Offaly in the All-Ireland semi-final in 2000 was followed by a defeat to Limerick in the first round of the 2001 Munster Championship. In 2002 the entire senior hurling panel took the unprecedented move of going on strike. With the support of the Gaelic Players Association the team vowed not to play or train until the county board agreed to improved funding and conditions. Demands included having their own doctor at all Championship and League fixtures, improved nutrition after training and matches, resolving disputes over travel and ticketing arrangements, providing players with free gymnasium access, and kit allowances as players mentioned that they were forced to pay for basic items such as extra socks. The strike was eventually resolved and all the demands were met, but not before the Cork footballers also went on strike in sympathy.

Following the strike the Cork hurlers came back stronger than ever, winning three out of the next four Munster championships. Cork reached four consecutive All-Ireland finals with victories coming in 2004 and 2005. In 2006 Cork attempted to capture an elusive three-in-a-row, however, they were defeated by Kilkenny.

The Cork senior footballers and hurlers withdrew their services for almost 100 days from November 2007 until February 2008, during a players' strike. This time the strike was not due to playing conditions but rather a dispute over whether the manager or board had the power to appoint selectors.

Cork featured again in 2013, defeating Clare in the Munster semi-final but losing to Limerick in the Munster final. Cork went through the back door accounting for Kilkenny and Dublin on their way to the final, where they met Clare again. The final ended in a draw, requiring a replay and in the replay Clare beat Cork. Both games have been described as some of the greatest finals of all time.

The Cork Hurling team made it to the All-Ireland Hurling Final in 2024, where they lost to Clare by 3–29 to 1–34 after extra time.

Cork won its first national title in 20 years winning the National Hurling League Final in 2025, beating Tipperary by 3–24 to 0–23.

In 2025, Cork despite winning both the National League an Munster hurling final, the latter after a dramatic penalty shoot out win over Limerick, Cork were defeated by Tipperary in the All Ireland final as Tipperary outscored a fourteen man Cork team by 3-14 to 0-2 to in the second half to record a 3-27 to 1-18 winning scoreline

== Supporters ==
Roy Keane, the former association football player, has attended Cork games and, before the 2024 All-Ireland Senior Hurling Championship final, told other former players from that sport that "an All-Ireland hurling final at Croke Park was the best live sporting occasion a person could attend".

Adam Idah, another association football player, attended games when he was a boy.

== Current panel ==
Team as per Cork vs Tipperary in the 2025 All-Ireland Senior Hurling Championship Final, 20th July 2025:

No.	Player	Position	Club
1	Patrick Collins	Goalkeeper	Ballinhassig
2	Niall O'Leary	Right corner-back	Castlelyons
3	Eoin Downey	Full-back	Glen Rovers
4	Seán O'Donoghue	Left corner-back	Inniscarra
5	Ciarán Joyce	Right half-back	Castlemartyr
6	Robert Downey (c)	Centre-back	Glen Rovers
7	Mark Coleman	Left half-back	Blarney
8	Tim O'Mahony	Midfield	Newtownshandrum
9	Darragh Fitzgibbon	Midfield	Charleville
10	Diarmuid Healy	Right half-forward	Lisgoold
11	Shane Barrett	Centre-forward	Blarney
12	Declan Dalton	Left half-forward	Fr. O'Neill's
13	Patrick Horgan	Right corner-forward	Glen Rovers
14	Alan Connolly	Full-forward	Blackrock
15	Brian Hayes	Left corner-forward	St Finbarr's

No.	Player	Position	Club
16	Bríon Saunderson	Goalkeeper	Midleton
17	Damien Cahalane	Full-back	St Finbarr's
18	Ger Millerick	Wing-back	Fr. O'Neill's
19	Cormac O'Brien	Wing-back	Newtownshandrum
20	Tommy O'Connell	Midfield	Midleton
21	Luke Meade	Midfield	Newcestown
22	Brian Roche	Centre-forward	Bride Rovers
23	Séamus Harnedy	Wing-forward	St. Ita's
24	Robbie O'Flynn	Wing-forward	Erin's Own
25	Conor Lehane	Corner-forward	Midleton
26	Shane Kingston	Wing-forward	Douglas

^{INJ} Player has had an injury which has affected recent involvement with the county team.
^{RET} Player has since retired from the county team.
^{WD} Player has since withdrawn from the county team due to a non-injury issue.

== Current management team ==
Updated to include changes made ahead of 2021 season:

- Manager: Ben O'Connor
- Selectors: Ronan Curran St Finbarr's

Terence McCarthy — Midleton. William Biggane — Newtownshandrum. Donal Cronin — Glen Rovers.

- Sports psychologist: Gerry Hussey

== Managerial history ==
Cork — like Kilkenny and Tipperary — traditionally appoints managers from inside, rather than seeking a "foreign" appointment.

Name	Club	From	To	All-Ireland titles	Munster titles
Bertie Troy	Newtownshandrum	1975	1980	1976, 1977, 1978	1976, 1977, 1978, 1979
Gerald McCarthy	St Finbarr's	1980	1982		
Johnny Clifford	Glen Rovers	1982	1983		1983
Justin McCarthy; Fr Michael O'Brien	Passage; Blackrock	1983	1985	1984	1984, 1985
Johnny Clifford	Glen Rovers	1985	1988	1986	1986
Charlie McCarthy	St Finbarr's	1988	1988		
Con Roche	St Finbarr's	1988	1989		
Fr Michael O'Brien	Blackrock	1989	1993	1990	1990, 1992
Johnny Clifford	Glen Rovers	1993	1995		
Jimmy Barry-Murphy	St Finbarr's	1995	2000	1999	1999, 2000
Tom Cashman	Blackrock	2000	2001		
Bertie Óg Murphy	Sarsfield's	2001	2002		
Dónal O'Grady	St Finbarr's	2002	2004	2004	2003
John Allen	St Finbarr's	2004	2006	2005	2005, 2006
Gerald McCarthy	St Finbarr's	2006	2009		
John Considine	Sarsfield's	2009	2009		
Denis Walsh	St Catherine's	2009	2011		
Jimmy Barry-Murphy	St Finbarr's	2011	2015		2014
Kieran Kingston	Tracton	2016	2017		2017
John Meyler	St Finbarr's	2018	2019		2018
Kieran Kingston	Tracton	2020	2022		
Pat Ryan	Sarsfield's	2023	2025		
Ben O'Connor	Newtownshandrum	2026			

== Players ==
=== Records ===
- First outfield hurler to wear a helmet in an inter-county game: Donal Clifford in the 1969 National Hurling League semi-final.

=== All Stars ===
Cork has 109 All Stars, as of 2019.

- 1971 (2), 1972 (5), 1974 (2), 1975 (1), 1976 (5), 1977 (8), 1978 (6), 1979 (3), 1980 (2), 1981 (1), 1982 (3), 1983 (3), 1984 (6), 1985 (2), 1986 (7), 1987 (1), 1988 (1), 1990 (6), 1991 (3), 1992 (3), 1993 (2), 1999 (6), 2000 (2), 2003 (3), 2004 (7), 2005 (6), 2006 (2), 2008 (1), 2012 (1), 2013 (3), 2017 (2), 2018 (3), 2019 (1)

=== Hurler of the Year winners ===
- Christy Ring - 1959
- Justin McCarthy - 1966
- Pat McDonnell - 1970
- Denis Coughlan - 1977
- John Horgan - 1978
- John Fenton - 1984
- Ger Cunningham - 1986
- Tony O'Sullivan - 1990
- Brian Corcoran - 1992, 1999
- Seán Óg Ó hAilpín - 2004
- Jerry O'Connor - 2005

=== Hurling Team of the Century ===
Goalkeeper: Dave Creedon

Full-backs: Jerry O'Riordan, Seán Óg Murphy, Paddy Collins

Half-backs: Tom Cashman, Jim O'Regan, Jim Young

Midfielders: Jack Lynch, Jim Hurley

Half-forwards: Eudie Coughlan, Christy Ring, Dinny Barry-Murphy

Full-forwards: Johnny Quirke, Ray Cummins, Micka Brennan

=== Hurling Team of the Millennium ===
Goalkeeper: Ger Cunningham

Full-backs: Jamesy Kelleher, Seán Óg Murphy, Brian Corcoran

Half-backs: Tom Cashman, Jim O'Regan, Denis Coughlan

Midfielders: Jack Lynch, Gerald McCarthy

Half-forwards: Eudie Coughlan, Josie Hartnett, Christy Ring

Full-forwards: Johnny Quirke, Ray Cummins, Paddy Barry

=== Strike replacements ===
The Cork senior hurling team of early 2009 was in a unique situation, when replacements had to be found for those who went on strike.

- 1 Alan Kennedy, 2 Eoin Clancy, 3 Chris Murphy, 4 Conor O'Sullivan, 5 Eoin Keane, 6 Ray Ryan (c), 7 Craig Leahy, 8 Barry Johnson, 9 Glenn O'Connor, 10 Tadhg Óg Murphy, 11 Aidan Ryan, 12 Darren Crowley, 13 Adrian Mannix, 14 Michael Collins, 15 Eoghan Cromin
- Substitutes: Ciarán Cronin, Alwyn Kearney, Joe Moran, Ger O'Driscoll, Tony Murphy, Robert O'Driscoll, Paudie Lynch, Colin O'Leary, Cian McCarthy
- Manager: Gerald McCarthy / Selectors: Ger FitzGerald, Teddy McCarthy, Johnny Keane, John Mortell / Trainer: Aodán Mac Gearailt

== Colours and crest ==
=== Kit evolution ===
Cork launched a new jersey ahead of the 2019 season, featuring a different sleeve and without white stripes down the side.

Cork launched a new jersey ahead of the 2021 season.

Cork launched a new jersey ahead of the 2023 season, with a noticeably whiter sleeve.

=== Team sponsorship ===
Cork was sponsored by O2 for 15 years. This arrangement ended on 31 December 2012. In 2013, Chill Insurance announced it would sponsor Cork in a three-year deal. Chill Insurance remained as sponsor for eight years until the end of 2020. Cork admitted in early 2021 that it had concluded a five-year deal with Sports Direct in December 2020, following public reports ahead of the intended launch. Following publication, it was subsequently confirmed that all negotiations were held with Sports Direct's Dublin-based marketing division, with no involvement from the British part of the company or from Mike Ashley, the billionaire owner of an English association football club with links to the company.

== Competitive record ==
=== Head-to-head record ===
Every Munster and All-Ireland SHC result since 2007.

As of 27 June 2022

County	Pld	W	D	L	Win %	First Meeting	Last Meeting	Province
Antrim	2	2	0	0	100%	2010	2022	Ulster
Clare	12	9	0	3	75%	2007	2022	Munster
Dublin	6	6	0	0	100%	2007	2021	Leinster
Galway	6	1	0	5	17%	2008	2022	Connacht
Kilkenny	5	2	0	3	40%	2008	2021	Leinster
Laois	1	1	0	0	100%	2011	2011	Leinster
Limerick	11	4	1	6	33%	2010	2022	Munster
Offaly	4	4	0	0	100%	2007	2012	Leinster
Tipperary	15	4	2	9	23%	2007	2022	Munster
Waterford	13	6	1	6	46%	2007	2022	Munster
Westmeath	1	1	0	0	100%	2019	2019	Leinster
Wexford	3	2	0	1	67%	2012	2016	Leinster

== List of seasons ==
=== Season-by-season record ===
Year	Championship						Other Competitions			
Year	Championship						National Hurling League	Munster Hurling League	Waterford Crystal Cup	
Year	Championship Results				All-Ireland SHC	Munster SHC	National Hurling League	Munster Hurling League	Waterford Crystal Cup	
Year	Pld	W	D	L	All-Ireland SHC	Munster SHC	National Hurling League	Munster Hurling League	Waterford Crystal Cup	
2015	4	2	0	2	QF	SF	RU	-	RU	
2016	3	1	0	2	R2	QF	6th	3rd	-	
2017	4	3	0	1	SF	Ch	QF	Ch	-	
2018	6	3	2	1	SF	Ch	6th	4th	-	
2019	6	3	0	3	QF	3rd	6th	GS	-	
2020	3	1	0	2	R2	SF	7th	RU	-	
2021	5	3	0	2	RU	SF	9th	-	-	
2022	3	3	0	3	QF	3rd	SF	-	-	
2023	4	1	1	2	N/A	4th	SF	TBD	-	-
2024	4	2	0	2	N/A	3rd	3rd	TBD	-	

== Honours ==
=== National ===
- All-Ireland Senior Hurling Championship
  - (gold) Winners (30): 1890, 1892, 1893, 1894, 1902, 1903, 1919, 1926, 1928, 1929, 1931, 1941, 1942, 1943, 1944, 1946, 1952, 1953, 1954, 1966, 1970, 1976, 1977, 1978, 1984, 1986, 1990, 1999, 2004, 2005
  - (silver) Runners-up (22): 1901, 1904, 1905, 1907, 1912, 1915, 1920, 1927, 1939, 1947, 1956, 1969, 1972, 1982, 1983, 1992, 2003, 2006, 2013, 2021, 2024, 2025
- National Hurling League
  - (gold) Winners (15): 1925–26, 1929–30, 1939–40, 1940–41, 1947–48, 1952–53, 1968–69, 1969–70, 1971–72, 1973–74, 1979–80, 1980–81, 1992–93, 1998, 2025
  - (silver) Runners-up (9): 1928–29, 1948–49, 1959–60, 1961–62, 2002, 2010, 2012, 2015, 2022
- All-Ireland Intermediate Hurling Championship
  - (gold) Winners (9): 1965, 1997, 2001, 2003, 2004, 2006, 2009, 2014, 2018
  - (silver) Runners-up (5): 1967, 1969, 2010, 2015, 2017
- All-Ireland Junior Hurling Championship
  - (gold) Winners (11): 1912, 1916, 1925, 1940, 1947, 1950, 1955, 1958, 1983, 1987, 1994
  - (silver) Runners-up (4): 1923, 1929, 1938, 1992
- All-Ireland Under-21/Under-20 Hurling Championship
  - (gold) Winners (14): 1966, 1968, 1969, 1970, 1971, 1973, 1976, 1982, 1988, 1997, 1998, 2020, 2021, 2023
  - (silver) Runners-up (4): 1975, 1977, 2018, 2019
- All-Ireland Minor Hurling Championship
  - (gold) Winners (19): 1928, 1937, 1938, 1939, 1941, 1951, 1964, 1967, 1969, 1970, 1971, 1974, 1978, 1979, 1985, 1995, 1998, 2001, 2021
  - (silver) Runners-up (12): 1936, 1966, 1968, 1975, 1977, 1986, 1988, 1990, 1994, 2000, 2007, 2017
- All-Ireland Vocational Schools Championship
  - (gold) Winners (9): 1970 (Cork County), 1996, 1997, 1998, 2000, 2005, 2006, 2007, 2008, 2009

=== Provincial ===
- Munster Senior Hurling Championship
  - (gold) Winners (55): 1888, 1890, 1892, 1893, 1894, 1901, 1902, 1903, 1904, 1905, 1907, 1912, 1915, 1919, 1920, 1926, 1927, 1928, 1929, 1931, 1939, 1942, 1943, 1944, 1946, 1947, 1952, 1953, 1954, 1956, 1966, 1969, 1970, 1972, 1975, 1976, 1977, 1978, 1979, 1982, 1983, 1984, 1985, 1986, 1990, 1992, 1999, 2000, 2003, 2005, 2006, 2014, 2017, 2018, 2025
  - (silver) Runners-up (31): 1896, 1897, 1898, 1906, 1909, 1910, 1913, 1914, 1916, 1921, 1932, 1940, 1941, 1948, 1950, 1951, 1957, 1959, 1960, 1961, 1964, 1965, 1968, 1980, 1987, 1988, 1991, 2004, 2010, 2013, 2026
- Munster Intermediate Hurling Championship
  - (gold) Winners (15): 1964, 1965, 1967, 1969, 1997, 1999, 2001, 2003, 2004, 2005, 2006, 2009, 2010, 2014, 2015
  - (silver) Runners-up (6): 1961, 1962, 1968, 1970, 2000, 2013
- Munster Junior Hurling Championship
  - (gold) Winners (21): 1912, 1916, 1923, 1925, 1929, 1932, 1937, 1938, 1940, 1947, 1950, 1955, 1958, 1959, 1960, 1983, 1984, 1987, 1992, 1994, 1996
  - (silver) Runners-up (16): 1913, 1914, 1926, 1933, 1934, 1936, 1946, 1948, 1949, 1952, 1953, 1957, 1986, 1989, 1990, 1991
- Munster Under-21/Under-20 Hurling Championship
  - (gold) Winners (22): 1966, 1968, 1969, 1970, 1971, 1973, 1975, 1976, 1977, 1982, 1988, 1991, 1993, 1996, 1997, 1998, 2005, 2007, 2018, 2020, 2021, 2023
  - (silver) Runners-up (14): 1978, 1979, 1980, 1981, 1987, 2000, 2003, 2004, 2006, 2011, 2014, 2017, 2019, 2024
- Munster Minor Hurling Championship
  - (gold) Winners (35): 1928, 1936, 1937, 1938, 1939, 1941, 1951, 1964, 1966, 1967, 1968, 1969, 1970, 1971, 1972, 1974, 1975, 1977, 1978, 1979, 1985, 1986, 1988, 1990, 1994, 1995, 1998, 2000, 2004, 2005, 2006, 2008, 2017, 2021, 2025
  - (silver) Runners-up (13): 1930, 1933, 1935, 1946, 1961, 1962, 1987, 1993, 2001, 2002, 2003, 2007, 2023

=== Other ===
- Centenary Cup
  - (gold) Winners (1): 1984

== See also ==
- Gaelic games in County Cork
