= List of Cork senior hurling team managers =

The following is a list of managers of the Cork senior hurling team and their major honours.

== Managers ==
Name	Home club	From	To	Honours	Notes
Bertie Troy	Newtownshandrum	1975	1980	3 All-Ireland Senior Hurling Championships; 4 Munster Senior Hurling Championships	
Gerald McCarthy	St Finbarr's	1980	1982		First term
Johnny Clifford	Glen Rovers	1982	1983	1 Munster Senior Hurling Championship	First term; co-manager
Fr Michael O'Brien	Blackrock	1983	1985	1 All-Ireland Senior Hurling Championship; 2 Munster Senior Hurling Championships	First term; co-manager
Justin McCarthy	Passage West	1983	1985	1 All-Ireland Senior Hurling Championship; 2 Munster Senior Hurling Championships	
Johnny Clifford	Glen Rovers	1985	1988	1 All-Ireland Senior Hurling Championship; 1 Munster Senior Hurling Championship	Second term
Charlie McCarthy	St Finbarr's	1988	1988		
Con Roche	St Finbarr's	8 November 1988	1989		
Fr Michael O'Brien	Blackrock	17 October 1989	19 October 1993	1 All-Ireland Senior Hurling Championship; 2 Munster Senior Hurling Championships	Second term
Johnny Clifford	Glen Rovers	1993	4 June 1995		Third term
Jimmy Barry-Murphy	St Finbarr's	17 October 1995	7 November 2000	1 All-Ireland Senior Hurling Championship; 2 Munster Senior Hurling Championships; 1 National Hurling League	First term
Tom Cashman	Blackrock	14 November 2000	28 May 2001		
Bertie Óg Murphy	Sarsfield's	17 September 2001	25 September 2002		
Dónal O'Grady	St Finbarr's	23 December 2002	4 October 2004	1 All-Ireland Senior Hurling Championship; 1 Munster Senior Hurling Championship	
John Allen	St Finbarr's	26 October 2004	19 September 2006	1 All-Ireland Senior Hurling Championship; 2 Munster Senior Hurling Championships	
Gerald McCarthy	St Finbarr's	8 November 2006	11 March 2009		Second term
John Considine	Sarsfield's	12 March 2009	29 March 2009		
Denis Walsh	St Catherine's	26 March 2009	23 August 2011		
Jimmy Barry-Murphy	St Finbarr's	6 September 2011	29 August 2015	1 Munster Senior Hurling Championships	Second term
Kieran Kingston	Tracton	10 October 2015	Present		
