= Aidan Ryan =

Aidan Ryan may refer to:

- Aidan Ryan (Cork hurler) (born 1986), Irish hurler
- Aidan Ryan (Tipperary hurler) (born 1965), Irish hurler
