= Joe Moran (hurler) =

Irish hurler

Personal information
- Native name: Seosamh Ó Moráin (Irish)
- Born: 1987 (age 38–39) Carrigaline, County Cork

Sport
- Sport: Hurling
- Position: Corner-back
Club
- Years: Club
- 2005–: Carrigaline
Inter-county
Years	County	Apps (scores)
2009	Cork	0 (0–0)
Inter-county titles
- Munster titles: 0
- All-Irelands: 0

Joe Moran (born 1987 in Carrigaline, County Cork) is an Irish inter-county hurler. At club level he plays with Carrigaline, and at county level he plays with the Cork senior team.

Moran played at underage level for Cork and played with Cork in the 2006 All-Ireland Minor Hurling Championship, winning the Munster championship. In 2008, he was a key player for Carrigaline as they won the Cork Intermediate Hurling Championship, being described as the team defence's "bedrock". Moran was among the players who were called up to the Cork senior squad by Gerald McCarthy for the 2009 National Hurling League when the 2008 squad refused to play under McCarthy, having featured in the pre-season Waterford Crystal tournament. He did not start for Cork in their first match, a loss to Dublin, but was drafted in at right half-back for the second game, against Tipperary. Along with Craig Leahy and Glenn O'Connor, he was praised for a "steady" performance; however, he only played 26 minutes in the next game, against Galway.
