= 2013 Waterford Crystal Cup =

- Dates: 19 January 2013 – 10 February 2013
- Teams: 12
- Sponsor: Waterford Crystal
- Champions: Clare; Patrick Donnellan (captain); Davy Fitzgerald (manager)
- Runners-up: Tipperary; Shane McGrath (captain); Eamon O'Shea (manager)

Tournament statistics
- Matches played: 11
- Goals scored: 14 (1.27 per match)
- Points scored: 131 (11.91 per match)
- Top scorer(s): Gary Guilfoyle (2-20)

The 2013 Waterford Crystal Cup was the eighth staging of the Waterford Crystal Cup since its establishment in 2006. The draw for the 2013 fixtures took place on 8 November 2012. The competition began on 20 January 2013 and concluded on 10 February 2013.

Tipperary were the defending champions. The final was contested by Clare and Tipp under lights in Thurles on 9 February 2013, with Clare winning by 1-21 to 1-13.

== Teams ==
A total of twelve teams will contest the Waterford Crystal Cup, including a return for all of the teams from the 2012 Waterford Crystal Cup.

Mary Immaculate College will make their debut in the competition while Cork Institute of Technology, who last took part in the competition in 2011, will not field a team once again.

== Fixtures ==
=== Preliminary round ===
19 January
Preliminary round

Cork	3-20 - 1-16	University College Cork
P Horgan 2-7 (1-4f, 0-2 65), P O'Sullivan 1-4, P Cronin 0-4, S Moylan 0-3, M Cussen, R O'Shea 0-1 each.	Report	W Griffin 1-7 (1-4f), S Harnedy 0-5, B Murray, D McCormack, B Hartnett, C Lehane 0-1 each.

The Mardyke, Cork

20 January
Preliminary round

Limerick	3-15 - 0-13	Mary Immaculate College
S Dowling 2-5 (0-4f), N Moran 0-4, D Breen 1-0, C Allis, K Downes, D Reidy, S Hickey, T Quaid, S Tobin 0-1. each	Report	J Conlon 0-5 (04f), C Galvin, S Curran 0-2 each, B O'Halloran, L Considine, D Hannon, L O'Farrell 0-1 each.

FitzGerald Park, Kilmallock

20 January
Preliminary round

Waterford	0-18 - 1-20	University of Limerick
S. O’Sullivan 0-6 (0-2 fs, 0-1 65); R. Foley and J. Dillon (0-2 fs, 0-1 pen) 0-3 each; S. Prendergast 0-2; K. Moran, S. Walsh, J. Barron and G. O’Brien (f) 0-1 each.	Report	K. Morris 0-7 (0-6 fs); E. Murphy 0-4; P. Kelly 1-0; A. Ryan and D. Butler 0-2 each; P. Walsh, S. Golden, T. Heffernan, C. Ryan and B. Stapleton 0-1 each.

WIT GAA Grounds, Waterford
Referee: F Horgan (Tipperary)

20 January
Preliminary round

Kerry	6-17 - 0-12	Institute of Technology, Tralee
D Collins 2-3. S Nolan 2-2 (0-2 frees), W O’Dwyer 1-4, S Maunsell 1-1, D Dineen and B O’Leary 0-2 each, D O’Connell 0-1 free, P Boyle and P J Connelly 0-1 each.	Report	M Deegan 0-7 frees, J Walsh, G O’Grady, S Conlon, P O’Connor and D Wallace 0-1 each.

Abbeydorney

=== Quarter-finals ===
24 January
Quarter-final

Kerry	3-7 - 1-25	Limerick Institute of Technology
	Report

Abbeydorney
26 January
Quarter-final

Cork	4-16 - 1-8	Waterford Institute of Technology
A Mannix 2-4, J Coughlan 1-4, C McCarthy 0-4 (fs), A Nash 1-0 (p), B Corry, D Kearney, S Moylan, R O’Shea 0-1 each.	Report	M Sheedy 1-3 (0-2 fs), E Murphy 0-2 (1f, 1 65), M Gaffney, H Kehoe (f), G Aylward 0-1 each.

Páirc Uí Rinn, Cork
Referee: S. Hourigan (Limerick)

27 January
Quarter-final

Clare	3-13 - 1-13	University of Limerick
N O’Connell (1-3) 0-1 ‘65, 0-1 f, S Morey (1-0), A O’Neill (1-0), C O’Connell (0-3) f’s, F Lynch (0-2), D OHalloran (0-2), C Ryan, E Barrett, T Kelly (0-1) each.	Report	K Morris (1-6) 0-6 f’s, A Ryan (0-2), D Butler, C Malone, S Golden, P Walsh, G Brennan (0-1) each.

O'Garney Park, Sixmilebridge
Referee: J Sexton (Cork)

27 January
Quarter-final

Tipperary	0-22 - 1-9	Limerick
J Ryan (4f, 1 65), E Kelly (4f) & B O’Meara (1f), 0-5 each, T Hammersley 0-3, S McGrath 0-2, J O’Dwyer and J O’Neill 0-1 each.	Report	S Dowling 1-3 (1-0 pen, 0-2f), G O’Mahoney 0-2f, N Maher 0-2, J Ryan and S Hickey 0-1 each.

Nenagh
Referee: C Lyons (Cork)

=== Semi-finals ===
3 February
Semi-final

Cork	2-11 - 0-20	Clare
A Mannix 2-1, P Horgan 0-4 (3f), C Murphy 0-2, C McCarthy, D Lordan, R O’Shea, J Coughlan 0-1 each.	Report	C Ryan 0-8 (6f), N O’Connell 0-6 (5f), P Collins, S O’Donnell 0-2 each, C O’Connell, J Clancy 0-1 each.

Sixmilebridge
Referee: J Ryan (Tipperary)

3 February
Semi-final

Tipperary	1-20 - 2-12	Limerick Institute of Technology
J O’Dwyer 0-7 (2f, 2 65s); J Forde, J O’Neill 0-3 each; M Heffernan 1-0; S McGrath, J McLoughney (1f) 0-2 each; J O’Brien, C Coughlan, S Bourke 0-1 each.	Report	G Guilfoyle 2-10 (1-9f); J Guilfoyle, S Collins 0-1 each.

Dolla
Referee: P Casey (Waterford)

=== Final ===
10 February
Final

Clare	1-21 - 1-13	Tipperary
C Ryan 0-9 (7f, 1 ’65′), T Kelly 0-5, S O’Donnell 1-1, S Morey, F Lynch 0-2 each, E Barrett, A O’Neill 0-1 each.	Report	E Kelly 0-6 (5f), P Maher 1-0, S Bourke, S Callanan (1f) 0-2, B O’Meara, J O’Brien, N McGrath (f) 0-1 each.

Semple Stadium
Referee: G O’Connell (Cork)

== Top scorers ==
=== Single game ===
Rank	Player	County	Tally	Total	Opposition
1	Gary Guilfoyle	Limerick Institute of Technology	2-10	16	Tipperary
2	Patrick Horgan	Cork	2-7	13	University College Cork
3	Shane Dowling	Limerick	2-5	11	Mary Immaculate College
4	William Griffin	University College Cork	1-7	10	Cork
