= 2008 Dublin county football team season =

The following is a summary of Dublin county football team's 2008 season.

== O'Byrne Cup ==
2008 O'Byrne Cup

January 05, 2008
Round 1

Dublin	2-12 – 1-9	Wicklow
B Brogan 0-5 (0-3f), B Kennedy 1-1 (0-1f), P Burke 1-0, A Brogan 0-2, C Moran, D O'Mahony, D Lally, J Sherlock 0-1 each		P Earls 0-3 (0-2f), S Hurley, JP Kelly (0-2f) 0-2 each, T Gill, S Furlong 0-1 each

Parnell Park
Attendance: ?
Referee: E Kinsella Laois
January 13, 2008
Quarter Final

Dublin	1-16 – 1-6	Westmeath
B Brogan 0-5 (0-2f), D O'Mahony 1-2 (0-1f), J Sherlock 0-4, D Lally 0-2, P Brogan, S Ryan, J O'Brien 0-1 each.		F Wilson 0-4 (0-1f), M Greene 1-1, D Dolan 0-1.

Parnell Park
Attendance: ?
Referee: P Kneel Louth.
January 22, 2008
Semi Final

Dublin	1-15 – 2-12 (AET)	Carlow
B Brogan 1-5 (0-3f), A Brogan, B Cullen, K Bonner 0-2 each, S O’Shaughnessy, P McMahon, J O’Brien (0-1f), G Cullen 0-1 each		E McCormack 1-5 (0-5f, 1-0 pen), J Murphy 1-0, R Walker 0-2, J Ryan, B Carberry, A Curran, P Walsh, M Nolan 0-1 each

Parnell Park
Attendance: ?
Referee: S Carroll Westmeath.
January 27, 2008
Semi Final Replay

Dublin	1-15 – 1-7	Carlow
O'Brien 0-08, P McMahon 1-01, B Kennedy, C Keaney 0-02 each, D Lally, K Bonner 0-01 each		J Murphy 1-3, E McCormack 0-3 (0-3f), R Walker 0-1

Parnell Park
Attendance: ?
Referee: J Bannon Longford
January 13, 2008
Final

Dublin	2-12 – 1-14	Longford
B Brogan 0-7 (0-5f), J Sherlock 2-0, J O'Brien 0-3 (0-2f), B McManamon, K Bonner 0-1 each		Kavanagh 1-4, F McGee 0-3 (0-2f), D Farrell, K Mulligan 0-2 each, D Barden, P Barden, P Dowd 0-1 each

Parnell Park
Attendance: ?
Referee: P Kneel Louth.

== National Football League ==
2008 National Football League results

February 02, 2008
Round 1

Dublin	1-07 – 1-05	Westmeath
M Vaughan 0-5 (0-5f), P Flynn 1-0, C Keaney, B Cullen 0-1 each.		D Dolan 1-2 (0-2f), M Flanagan 0-2 (0-1 '45'), A Mangan 0-1 (0-1f)

Parnell Park
Attendance: ?
Referee: J McQuillan Cavan.
February 16, 2008
Round 2
Points awarded to Dublin due to 2007–8 Cork players' strike

Dublin	N/A	Cork
N/A		N/A

Páirc Uí Rinn
Attendance: N/A
Referee: – N/A
February 02, 2008
Round 3

Dublin	1-09 – 0-07	Cavan
M Vaughan 0-4 (0-2f), B Brogan 1-1, B McManamon, C Keaney (0-1f) 0-2 each.		S Johnston 0-6 (0-4f), M Lyng 0-1

Breffni Park
Attendance: ?
Referee: – P Fox Westmeath.
February 16, 2008
Round 4
Called off due to waterlogged pitch

Dublin	N/A	Monaghan
N/A		N/A

Parnell Park
Attendance: N/A
Referee: S Doyle Wexford
February 23, 2008
Round 4

Dublin	1-10 – 0-13	Monaghan
C Keaney 0-4 (0-1 '45', 0-1f), P Flynn 1-0, M Vaughan (0-2f), B Brogan (0-2f) 0-2 each, J Sherlock, D Henry 0-1 each.		T Freeman 0-7 (0-7f), P Finlay 0-5 (0-5f), S Gollogly 0-1.

Parnell Park
Referee: S Doyle Wexford
March 30, 2008
Round 5
Called off due to waterlogged pitch

Dublin	N/A	Armagh
N/A		N/A

St. Oliver Plunkett Park
Attendance: N/A
April 5, 2008
Round 6

Dublin	3-20 - 0-07	Roscommon
C Keaney 1-5 (0-3f), D Connolly, T Quinn (0-1f) 1-3 each, B Brogan, B McManamon 0-3 each, C Whelan, A Brogan, E O'Gara 0-1		G Heneghan 0-3 (0-2f), S Kilbride 0-2, D Keenan, F Dolan 0-1 each.

Parnell Park
Attendance: N/A
Referee: John Bannon Longford.
April 13, 2008
Round 5 refixure

Dublin	1-10 - 3-13	Armagh
B Brogan 1-3, C Keaney 0-4 (0-4f), J Sherlock 0-2, E Fennell 0-1.		S McDonnell 1-4 (0-1f), R Clarke 1-3, P McKeever 0-3 (0-3f), C Vernon 1-0, S Kernan 0-2, T Kernan 0-1 (0-1f).

St. Oliver Plunkett Park
Referee: D Fahy Longford.
April 21, 2008
Round 7

Dublin	0-13- 2-06	Meath
T Quinn 0-6 (5f), D Connolly 0-3, C Moran, M Vaughan (f), J Sherlock, B McManamon 0-1 each		J Sheridan 1-1, S Kenny 1-0, C Ward, S Bray, M Ward, P Byrne, G Reilly 0-1 each.

Parnell Park
Referee: Paddy Russell Tipperary.

== Leinster Senior Football Championship ==
June 8, 2008
Quarter final

Dublin	1-21- 0-12	Louth
S Cluxton; D Henry, R McConnell, S O'Shaughnessy; P Casey, B Cullen, B Cahill; E Fennell, S Ryan; C Moran 0-2, J Sherlock 0-2, P Andrews 0-1; A Brogan 1-7, C Keaney 0-3, 3f, T Quinn 0-6, 3f. Subs: M Vaughan 0-1 for P Andrews (on 53 minutes), B McManamon for J Sherlock (61), K Nolan for B Cullen (67), P McMahon for Cahill (69) and D Magee for E Fennell (69).		S Reynolds; D Finnegan, M Fanning, J Neary; J O'Brien, C McGuinness, R Finnegan 0-1; P Keenan 0-1, R Carroll 0-1; A Reid, M Stanfield, D Crilly 0-2, 1f; C Judge 0-1, A Hoey 0-3, 1f, S Lennon 0-1. Subs: A Page for J Neary (on 42 minutes), J Murray 0-1 for D Crilly (46), B White 0-1 for A Reid (53) and B Donnelly for M Stanfield (61)

Croke Park
Attendance: 56,496
Referee: Martin Duffy Sligo.
June 29, 2008
Semi final

Dublin	0-13 - 1-8	Westmeath
Team: S Cluxton; D Henry, R McConnell, S O'Shaughnessy; C Moran, B Cullen, B Cahill; E Fennell, S Ryan; P Flynn, J Sherlock, B Brogan; A Brogan, C Keaney, T Quinn, D Connolly for B Brogan ’17 (inj), P Casey for R McConnell H/T, D Connolly for P Flynn H/T, C Whelan for E Fennell ’55, B McManamon for T Quinn ’65. Scorers: Keaney 0-1 (0-1 f), Quinn 0-4 (0-4 f), A Brogan 0-1, D Henry 0-1, D Connolly 0-2, C Moran 0-1, B Cahill 0-1, J Sherlock 0-1, C Whelan 0-1.		Team:: G Connaughton; F Boyle, K Gavin, J Keane; M Ennis, D Heavin, D Healy; D O'Donoghue, D Duffy; F Wilson, J Smyth, D Harte; D Dolan, D Glennon D Bannon, A Mangan for D Bannon (inj) ’23, M Flanagan for J Smith ’57, David Glennon for F Wilson ’68. Scorers: Dennis Glennon 0-3 (0-1f) Ennis 1-0, D Dolan 0-5 (0-3).

Croke Park
Attendance: 67,005
Referee: Padraig Hughes Armagh
July 20, 2008
Final

Dublin	3-23 - 0-09	Wexford
Team: S Cluxton; D Henry, P Griffin, C Moran (0-01); K Nolan, B Cullen, B Cahill (0-01); C Whelan, S Ryan (0-01); D Connolly (1-03), J Sherlock (0-03), K Bonner; A Brogan (capt) (1-04, 1 '45'), C Keaney (0-06, 4f), T Quinn (0-04, 4f). Subs: P Casey for Nolan (24 mins), P Flynn for Bonner (56), M Vaughan (1-00) for Connolly (58), R McConnell for Griffin (62), D Murray for Sherlock (65).		Team:: A Masterson; N Murphy, P Wallace, B Malone; A Morrissey, D Murphy, C Morris (capt); T Howlin, B Doyle; R Barry (0-01), E Bradley (0-02), A Flynn; C Lyng (0-04, 4f), PJ Banville, M Forde (0-02). Subs: P Colfer for Doyle (27 mins), D Walsh for N Murphy (31), R Stafford for Howlin (39), S Roche for Flynn (60), C Byrne for Banville (60).

Croke Park
Referee: Gerry Kinneavy (Galway)

== All-Ireland Senior Football Championship ==
All-Ireland Senior Football Championship 2008

August 13, 2008
Quarter final

Dublin	1-8 - 3-14	Tyrone
Team: 1 S Cluxton; 2 D Henry, 3 R McConnell, 4 P Griffin; 5 C Moran, 6 B Cullen, 7 B Cahill (0-1); 8 C Whelan, 9 S Ryan; 14 C Keaney (1-1), 11 J Sherlock, 12 K Bonner; 13 A Brogan (capt), 10 D Connolly, 15 T Quinn (0-2, 0-2f). Substitutes: B Brogan (0-3) for A Brogan 5 mins; P Casey for Connolly 47 mins; M Vaughan (0-1, 0-1f) for Sherlock 53 mins; B McManamon for Quinn 53 mins; E Fennell for McConnell 61 mins.		Team:Tyrone: 1 J Devine; 4 C Gourlay, 3 Justin McMahon, 6 C Gormley (0-1); 5 D Harte (1-1), 2 R McMenamin, 7 P Jordan; 20 C Holmes (0-1), 9 E McGinley (0-1); 10 B Dooher (0-2), 11 B McGuigan, 12 Joe McMahon (1-1); 15 C McCullagh (0-3), 14 S Cavanagh (1-2, 0-1f), 13 T McGuigan (0-2). Substitutes: M Penrose for T McGuigan 55 mins; D McCaul for Jordan 61 mins; R Mellon for Dooher 64 mins; K Hughes for Holmes 64 mins; O Mulligan for B McGuigan 68 mins.

Croke Park
Referee: A Mangan (Kerry)

== See also ==
- 2008 Dublin county hurling team season
