= Chris Murphy (hurler) =

Cork hurler

Personal information
- Native name: Criostóir Ó Murchú (Irish)
- Born: Blackrock, County Cork
- Height: 6 ft 0 in (183 cm)

Sport
- Sport: Hurling
- Position: Full-back
Club
Years	Club	Apps (scores)
2000s–	Blackrock	40 (0–0)
Inter-county
Years	County	Apps (scores)
2009–	Cork	0 (0–0)
Inter-county titles
- Munster titles: 0
- All-Irelands: 0

Chris Murphy (born 1985 in Blackrock, County Cork) is an Irish sportsman. He plays hurling with his local club Blackrock and has been a member of the Cork senior team since 2009 where he was called up due to the 2008 panels strike. Murphy was also a Cork Senior Football panelist in 2006 and 2007 before deciding to concentrate on Hurling. In 2005 Murphy won a Junior All Ireland Football medal with Cork. The following year Murphy represented Cork in both U21 Football and Hurling, winning a Munster U21 medal from full back in Football while also playing full back with the U21 hurlers which were beaten in the Munster final by Tipperary. Murphy was awarded the Man of the Match award for his display at Full Back in the 2009 National League encounter against Tipperary In Thurles, which was a notable achievement as his direct opponents on the night where John O Brien and Patrick "Bonner" Maher.
