= 2008 Dublin county hurling team season =

The following is a summary of Dublin county hurling team's 2008 season.

== Walsh Cup and shield ==
January 20, 2008
Round 1

Dublin	0-13 – 2-15	UCD
D O’Callaghan 0-5, P O’Boyle 0-3, D Curtin (0-2f) 0-2, P O’Driscoll, J McCaffrey, K Flynn 0-1 each.		M Nolan 1-5 (0-4f), T Fitzgerald 1-1, S Nolan (0-1f), J Boland, E Power 0-2 each, B Murphy, PJ Nolan, C McBride 0-1 each

Thomas Davis
Referee: A Stapleton Laois.

Dublin decided not to play in the Walsh Cup shield and so the win was handed to Westmeath.

== NHL ==
2008 National Hurling League results

February 10, 2008
Round 1

Dublin	0-22 – 0-15	Antrim
S Mullen 0-12 (0-8f, 0-2 '65'), D O'Callaghan 0-3, D Qualter, R O'Carroll 0-2 each, J Boland, K Flynn, P O'Driscoll 0-1 each.		L Watson 0-9 (0-5f, 0-2 '65'), N McManus 0-3, E McCloskey, P McGill, S McCrory 0-1 each.

Parnell Park
Referee: J McGrath Westmeath
February 17, 2008
Round 2

Dublin	2-10 – 1-21	Kilkenny
S Mullen 0-6 (0-6f) K Flynn 1-1, P Carton 1-0, J McCaffrey, S Lambert, R O’Carroll 0-1 each		E Brennan 0-6, R Hogan 1-2, R Power 0-3 (0-1f), J Fitzpatrick (0-1f), A Fogarty, W O’Dwyer, E Reid 0-2 each, M Comerford, TJ Reid (0-1 sline) 0-1 each.

Nowlan Park
Referee: B Gavin Offaly
March 9, 2008
Round 3

Dublin	2-16 – 3-18	Cork
S Mullen 0-6 (0-6f) K Flynn 1-1, P Carton 1-0, J McCaffrey, S Lambert, R O’Carroll 0-1 each		E Brennan 0-6, R Hogan 1-2, R Power 0-3 (0-1f), J Fitzpatrick (0-1f), A Fogarty, W O’Dwyer, E Reid 0-2 each, M Comerford, TJ Reid (0-1 sline) 0-1 each.

Parnell Park
Referee: S Whelan Wexford.
March 23, 2008
Round 4

Dublin	0-15 – 2-09	Wexford
S Mullen 0-7 (0-6f), D O’Callaghan, P Carton, J McCaffrey 0-2 each, S Lambert, K Flynn 0-1 each.		S Nolan 1-4 (0-4f, 1-0 pen), R Jacob 0-3 (0-3f), C Farrell 1-0, D Redmond 0-2.

Walsh Park
Referee: D Connolly Kilkenny.
March 23, 2008
Round 5

Dublin	1-17 – 3-18	Waterford
D O’Callaghan 0-8 (0-6f, 0-1 ‘65’), D O’Dwyer 1-1, J McCaffrey 0-2, S Lambert, S Mullen, J Burke, P Ryan, K Flynn, P Kelly 0-1 each.		J Mullane 3-4, E Kelly 0-9 (0-6f, 0-1 ‘65’), S Prendergast 0-2, M Walsh, E McGrath, D Shanahan 0-1 each.

Walsh Park
Referee: S McMahon Clare.

== Leinster Senior Hurling Championship ==
May 25, 2008
Quarter-final

Dublin	3-21 – 0-11	Westmeath
G Maguire; N Corcoran, S Hiney, T Brady; M Carton 0-1, R Fallon 0-3(2 65s), J Boland; J McCaffrey 0-1, S Lambert 0-2; J Burke 1-1, D Qualter, K Flynn 0-2; D O’Callaghan 1-5(0-1f), J Kelly 1-1, P Carton 0-1. Subs: R O’Carroll 0-3 for Qualter (30); D Curtin 0-1 for P Carton (46); S Mullen for O’Carroll (63); P O’Driscoll for Lambert (65); G Bennett for McCaffrey (66)		M Briody; G Gavin, P Greville, A Price; D Curley, D McCormack, C Jordan; B Connaughton, E Loughlin; A Mitchell 0-4(fs), L Smith, P Clarke 0-2; J Shaw, P Dowdall, D McNicholas 0-2. Subs: B Murtagh 0-3 for Connaughton (21); E Price for Smith (53); J Clarke for Mitchell (58), B Smith for Jordan (65).

O'Moore Park
Referee: C McAlister Cork.
June 14, 2008
Semi-final

Dublin	0-19 – 2-13	Wexford
G Maguire; N Corcoran, S Hiney, T Brady; M Carton (0-01), R Fallon, J Boland; J McCaffrey (0-01, 0-01sl), S Lambert (0-01); J Burke (0-01), D O'Dwyer (0-01), K Flynn (0-01); D O'Callaghan (0-09, 0-03f), J Kelly, R O'Carroll (0-04).Subs used: P Ryan for Kelly (40 mins), D Curtin for Flynn (55), D Qualter for Lambert (63), P Kelly for Burke (69).		D Fitzhenry; M Travers, K Rossiter, P Roche; M Jacob, D O'Connor, D Stamp; B O'Leary, C Farrell; PJ Nolan, E Quigley (1-02), D Lyng (0-05, 0-04f); D Redmond (0-01), S Banville (1-00), R Jacob (0-03).Subs used: S Doyle (0-02) for Farrell (41 mins), M Doyle for O'Leary (49), J Tonks for Roche (57).

Nowlan Park
Referee: S Roche Tipperary.
June 22, 2008
Semi-final replay

Dublin	1-15 – 2-15	Wexford
G Maguire; N Corcoran, S Hiney, T Brady; M Carton (0-01), R Fallon (0-02), J Boland; J McCaffrey (0-02), S Lambert; J Burke, D O'Dwyer, K Flynn (0-01) (P Carton 28 mins); D O'Callaghan (1-09), J Kelly, R O'Carroll. Subs used: P Carton for Flynn (28 mins), D Qualter for Lambert, P Ryan for Kelly (both 42), P Kelly for M Carton (53), P O'Driscoll for O'Dwyer (55).		: D Fitzhenry; M Travers, K Rossiter, P Roche; M Jacob, D O'Connor, D Stamp; D Redmond (0-01), PJ Nolan (0-01); S Doyle (0-03), E Quigley (0-01), D Lyng (0-04); W Doran (0-02), S Banville (1-01), R Jacob (1-02). Subs used: B Lambert for Redmond (62 mins), M Doyle for Nolan (66), C Farrell for S Doyle (70).

Croke Park
Referee: W Wadding Waterford.

== All-Ireland qualifiers ==
All-Ireland Senior Hurling Championship 2008

July 13, 2008
All-Ireland qualifiers round 1

Dublin	0-15 – 1-17	Cork
G Maguire; N Corcoran, K Ryan, T Brady; S Hiney, R Fallon, J Boland; J McCaffrey, S Lambert; J Burke, D O'Dwyer, D Qualter, D O'Callaghan (0-10, three frees), K Flynn, R O Carroll (0-3) Subs: P O'Driscoll for Flynn (44 mins), P Ryan (0-2) for Burke (49 mins), P Bergin for Ryan (50 mins), J Kelly for D O'Dwyer (56 mins), P Kelly for McCaffrey (63 mins).		D Óg Cusack; S O'Neill, D O'Sullivan, B Murphy; E Cadogan (0-1), J Gardiner (0-1, a free), K McGann; T Kenny (0-2), J O'Connor (0-2); B O'Connor(0-2, one free), N McCarthy (0-1), T McCarthy; C Naughton (0-3), N Ronan (0-2, one free), J Deane (1-1). Subs: K Hartnett for Cadogan (51 mins), P Cronin (0-1) for T McCarthy (51 mins), R Curran for McGann (60 mins), P Horgan (0-1) for B O'Connor 65mins.

Páirc Uí Chaoimh
Referee: James Owens Wexford.

== See also ==
- 2008 Dublin county football team season
