= Ger O'Driscoll (hurler) =

Cork hurler

Personal information
- Native name: Gearóid Ó Drisceoil (Irish)
- Born: 5 February 1987 (age 39) Newcestown, County Cork
- Height: 5 10"

Sport
- Sport: Hurling
- Position: Corner-back
Club
- Years: Club
- 2000s–: Newcestown
Inter-county
Years	County	Apps (scores)
2009–	Cork	3 (0–1)
Inter-county titles
- Munster titles: 0
- All-Irelands: 0

Ger O'Driscoll (born 1987 in Newcestown, County Cork) is an Irish sportsman. He plays hurling with his local club Newcestown and has been a member of the Cork senior team since 2009 due to the 2008–9 Cork senior hurling team strike. O'Driscoll won back-to-back Munster minor titles in 2004 and 2005.
