= Martin O'Neill (hurler) =

Irish hurler

Personal information
- Native name: Máirtín Ó Néill (Irish)
- Nickname: Blondie
- Born: 1992 (age 33–34) Waterford, Ireland
- Occupation: Recruiter

Sport
- Sport: Hurling
- Position: Right corner-forward
Club
- Years: Club
- Mount Sion
Club titles
- Waterford titles: 0
College
- Years: College
- 2011-2015: Waterford Institute of Technology
College titles
- Fitzgibbon titles: 0
Inter-county*
Years	County	Apps (scores)
2010-2015	Waterford	7 (0-01)
Inter-county titles
- Munster titles: 0
- All-Irelands: 0
- NHL: 1
- All Stars: 0
- *Inter County team apps and scores correct as of 15:52, 12 December 2021.

Martin O'Neill (born 1992) is an Irish hurler who plays for Waterford Senior Championship club Mount Sion. He previously lined out with the Waterford senior hurling team.

== Career ==
O'Neill first played hurling at juvenile and underage levels with Mount Sion before eventually progressing onto the club's senior team. He simultaneously lined out with the Waterford Institute of Technology in the Fitzgibbon Cup. O'Neill first appeared on the inter-county scene as captain of the Waterford minor hurling team that won the Munster MHC title in 2009. He later lined out with the under-21 team. O'Neill was still a member of the minor team when he was drafted onto the Waterford senior hurling team as a member of the extended training panel in 2010. He was part of the team that won the National Hurling League in 2015.

== Career statistics ==
Team	Year	National League			Munster		All-Ireland		Total	
Team	Year	Division	Apps	Score	Apps	Score	Apps	Score	Apps	Score
Waterford	2012	Division 1A	5	0-15	2	0-01	0	0-00	7	0-16
Waterford	2013	Division 1A	1	0-04	1	0-00	2	0-00	4	0-04
Waterford	2014	Division 1A	0	0-00	0	0-00	2	0-00	2	0-00
Waterford	2015	Division 1B	5	0-01	0	0-00	0	0-00	5	0-01
Career total			11	0-20	3	0-01	4	0-00	18	0-21

== Honours ==
Mount Sion

- Waterford Junior A Football Championship: 2021

Waterford

- National Hurling League: 2015
- Munster Minor Hurling Championship: 2009
