= Alan Kennedy (hurler) =

Cork hurler

Personal information
- Native name: Alan Ó Cinnéide (Irish)
- Nickname: Pops
- Born: 4 January 1986 (age 40) Glanmire, County Cork, Ireland
- Height: 6 ft 0 in (183 cm)

Sport
- Sport: Hurling
- Position: Goalkeeper
Club
- Years: Club
- 2005–: Sarsfields
Club titles
- Cork titles: 5
- Munster titles: 1
Inter-county
Years	County	Apps (scores)
2009	Cork	0 (0–0)
Inter-county titles
- Munster titles: 0
- All-Irelands: 0
- NHL: 0
- All Stars: 0

Alan Kennedy (born 4 January 1986) is an Irish hurler. At club level he plays with Sarsfields and at inter-county level he has played at various levels with Cork.

== Career ==
At club level, Kennedy first played for Sarsfields at juvenile and underage levels. He progressed to the club's senior team as third-choice goalkeeper before becoming the first-choice goalkeeper in 2007. Kennedy won his first Cork SHC medal in 2008 before claiming further winners' medals in 2010, when he was also team captain, 2012, 2014 and 2023. He added a Munster Club SHC medal to his collection in 2024, having been a member of the extended panel.

Kennedy first appeared on the inter-county scene for Cork as sub-goalkeeper on the minor team that beat Tipperary to win the Munster MHC title in 2004. He earned a call-up to the Cork senior hurling team in 2009, at a time when the majority of the team's regular players were on strike. Kennedy lined out in a number of National Hurling League games before the strike ended.

== Career statistics ==
Team	Year	National League			Munster		All-Ireland		Total	
Team	Year	Division	Apps	Score	Apps	Score	Apps	Score	Apps	Score
Cork	2009	Division 1	3	0-00	0	0-00	0	0-00	3	0-00
Career total			3	0-00	0	0-00	0	0-00	3	0-00

== Honours ==
Sarsfields

- Munster Senior Club Hurling Championship: 2024
- Cork Premier Senior Hurling Championship: 2008, 2010 (c), 2012, 2014, 2023

Cork

- Munster Minor Hurling Championship: 2004
