= 2006 Waterford Crystal Cup =

- Dates: 15 January 2006 – 5 February 2006
- Teams: 10
- Champions: Limerick (1st title)
- Runners-up: Waterford Institute of Technology

Tournament statistics
- Matches played: 9
- Goals scored: 19 (2.11 per match)
- Points scored: 231 (25.67 per match)

The 2006 Waterford Crystal Cup was the inaugural staging of the Waterford Crystal Cup. The draw for the fixtures took place on 20 December 2005. The cup began on 15 January 2006 and ended on 5 February 2006.

On 5 February 2006, Limerick won the cup following a 1-19 to 3-10 defeat of Waterford Institute of Technology in the final. This was their first Waterford Crystal Cup title.

== Participating teams ==
The newly launched Waterford Crystal Cup featured five county teams and five third level college teams. The Munster Council run the competition on a similar system to the McGrath Cup.

== Results ==
Preliminary round

15 January 2006 Preliminary round	Waterford	1-9 - 1-18	Limerick	Walsh Park, Waterford
	C Carey 1-3, J Mullane 0-3, P Flynn 0-2 and D Bennett 0-1.	Report	O Moran 1-5, M Keane 0-3, J O’Brien and D Ryan 0-2 each, A O’Shaughnessy, P O’Grady, W Walsh, N Collins, D O’Grady and O Moran 0-1 each.	Referee: D Kirwan (Cork)

15 January 2006 Preliminary round	University of Limerick	0-15 - 1-6	Cork Institute of Technology	Claughaun Sportsfield, Limerick
	J Heenaghan 0-7, P O'Flynn 0-4, N Kenny 0-2, G Ryan, R Ruth 0-1.	Report	S O'Sullivan 1-2, PJ Copps 0-2, K Canty, S Power 0-1.	Referee: G Hoey (Clare)

Quarter-finals

22 January 2006 Quarter-final	Clare	1-14 - 0-16	University College Cork	Clarecastle Sportsfield
	D McMahon 1-7 (6f), T Griffin 0-3, F Lynch 0-2, B Nugent 0-2.	Report	J Fitzpatrick 0-6, S O'Sullivan 0-4 (2 65s, 1f), E Hanley 0-3, R Conway 0-2, I McCarthy 0-1.	Referee: S O'Ryan (Tipperary)

22 January 2006 Quarter-final	University of Limerick	2-14 - 0-5	Limerick Institute of Technology
	B Carroll 0-8; J Greene 1-1; G Ryan 1-0; C Hassett 0-2; P Kennedy, M Culbert, A Egan 0-1 each.	Report	A Quinn 0-2; S Tierney, C Early, N Healy 0-1 each.

22 January 2006 Quarter-final	Kerry	3-10 - 2-19	Waterford Institute of Technology	Ballyheigue Sportsfield

22 January 2006 Quarter-final	Limerick	0-18 - 0-12	Tipperary	Gaelic Grounds, Limerick
	M Keane (0-8, including 5 frees), D Ryan (0-4), M O'Brien (0-2), A O'Shaughnessy (0-1), D O'Grady (0-1), A Brennan (0-1), M Fitzgerald (0-1).	Report	P O'Brien (0-4 frees), K Dunne (0-3 including 1 '65 and 1 free), N Curran (0-2), S Butler (0-2), P Kerwick (0-1).	Referee: A Heagney (Clare)

Semi-finals

29 January 2006 Semi-final	Limerick	1-14 - 0-13	Clare	Gaelic Grounds, Limerick
	M Keane 0-7 (6f); D O'Grady 1-2; C Fitzgerald, P O'Grady, S O'Connor, M O'Brien, O Moran 0-1 each.	Report	D McMahon 0-4 (3f); T Carmody 0-4 (2f); T Griffin 0-2; B O'Connell, D O'Connell, F Lynch 0-1 each.	Referee: B White (Tipperary)

29 January 2006 Semi-final	Waterford Institute of Technology	1-16 - 2-3	University of Limerick	Leahy Park, Cashel
	B Dowlin 0-11; A Cullenane 1-3; N Gleeson and C O Brien 0-1 each.	Report	T Stapleton and G Ryan 1-0 each; C Hassett, R Hayes, P Dowling 0-1 each.	Referee: J McDonnell (Tipperary)

Final

5 February 2006 Final	Limerick	1-19 - 3-10	Waterford Institute of Technology	Gaelic Grounds, Limerick
	M Keane (1-10, 0-8 frees, 0-1 '65), C Fitzgerald, M O'Brien, D Ryan (0-2 each), O Moran, TJ Ryan, N Moran (0-1) each.	Report	B Dowling (1-6, 0-6 frees), W Ryan (1-1, 1-0 pen), C Phelan (1-0), M Walsh, A Cullinane, C O'Brien (0-1) each.	Referee: G Hoey (Clare)

== Top scorers ==
Overall

Rank	Player	County	Tally	Total	Matches	Average
1	Brian Dowling	Limerick	2-25	31	3	10.33
1	Mark Keane	Limerick	1-28	31	4	7.75
