= 2012 Waterford Crystal Cup =

Seventh edition of Waterford Crystal Cup

- Dates: 22 January 2012 – 4 March 2012
- Teams: 12
- Sponsor: Waterford Crystal
- Champions: Tipperary; Brendan Cummins (captain); Declan Ryan (manager)
- Runners-up: Clare; Patrick Donnellan (captain); Davy Fitzgerald (manager)

Tournament statistics
- Matches played: 11
- Goals scored: 35 (3.18 per match)
- Points scored: 363 (33 per match)

The 2012 Waterford Crystal Cup was the seventh staging of the Waterford Crystal Cup since its establishment in 2006. The draw for the 2012 fixtures took place on 3 November 2011. The championship began on 22 January 2012 and ended on 4 March 2012.

Waterford were the defending champions, however, Tipperary won the cup following a 1–21 to 2–12 defeat of Clare.

== Results ==
=== Preliminary round ===
22 January 2012
Preliminary round

Tipperary	2-24 - 1-16	Limerick Institute of Technology
P Bourke 0-13 (12f); J O’Neill 1-1; S McGrath 0-3; T Hammersley 1-0; B Maher, A Ryan, B O’Meara 0-2 each; D Collins 0-1.	Report	J Canning 1-8 (0-6f); P Browne, S O’Brien 0-2 each; C McInerney 0-2f; E Ryan, C Madden 0-1 each.

Silvermines GAA Grounds, Dolla
Referee: J Sexton (Cork)

29 January 2012
Preliminary round

Kerry	1-20 - 1-15	Institute of Technology, Tralee
S Brick 0-12 (8fs, 1 65), D O’Connell 1-4 (2fs), J Egan 0-2, M Boyle, S Nolan 0-1 each.	Report	E Brosnan 1-5 (4fs), M Deegan 0-3 (2fs), M Lynch 0-2, T Morley, B O’Grady, F Kennedy, G O’Doherty, D O’Halloran 0-1 each.

Fitzgerald Stadium, Killarney
Referee: M O'Connor (Limerick)

29 January 2012
Preliminary round

Clare	3-25 - 0-5	Waterford Institute of Technology
D Keane 1-6; C Ryan 0-7 (0-3f); A Cunningham 1-4 (0-2f); E Hayes 1-0; N O’Connell 0-3; P Donnellan 0-2; J Clancy 0-2, C Cooney 0-1.	Report	D Murphy 0-2 (0-2f); J Dillon, K Hammersley (f), C O’Meara (f), 0-1 each.

O'Garney Park, Sixmilebridge
Referee: D Kirwan (Cork)

=== Quarter-finals ===
4 February 2012
Quarter-final

Cork	5-18 - 1-14	Kerry
P Horgan 1-3 (0-2f), B Corry 2-0, E Murphy 1-2, C McCarthy 0-5 (0-2 ’65), R Clifford 1-1, L O’Farrell, C Naughton 0-3 each, D Sweetnam 0-1.	Report	S Brick 0-6 (0-6f), A Boyle 1-0, S Nolan, D Dineen, J Egan 0-2 each, M Boyle, A Royle 0-1 each.

Páirc Uí Rinn, Cork
Referee: M Wadding (Waterford)

4 February 2012
Quarter-final

Tipperary	2-11 - 0-12	University of Limerick
P Bourke 1-3 (1-2f), B O’Meara 1-0, E Kelly 0-3, A Ryan, J O’Neill, G Ryan, J O’Brien, J Woodlock 0-1 each.	Report	C McGrath 0-7 (6fs), P Kelly 0-2, L Ryan (f), M Heffernan, P Walsh 0-1 each.

MacDonagh Park, Nenagh
Referee: C Lyons (Cork)

4 February 2012
Quarter-final

Clare	0-18 - 1-15 (AET)	Limerick
N O’Connell 0-7 (0-3f, 0-1 65); A Cunningham 0-6 (0-6f); P Donnellan 0-2; E Hayes, J Clancy, J Conlon, 0-1 each.	Report	D Hannon 1-11 (1-0p, 0-5f, 0-2 65s); C Allis 0-2; W McNamara 0-2.

O'Garney Park, Sixmilebridge
Referee: C McAllister (Cork)

5 February 2012
Quarter-final

Waterford	3-19 - 1-19	University College Cork
M. O’Neill (1-8, 0-7 frees); M. Walsh (1-3); M. Shanahan (1-0); S. O’Sullivan(0-2); S. Prendergast, S. Walsh, D. Twomey, S. Molumphy, J. Nagle, P. O’Brien(0-1) each.	Report	B. Hartnett(1-2); P. O’Mahony (0-5, 0-4 frees); B. O’Sullivan (0-3); W. Griffin(0-3, frees); S. Bourke (0-2); P. Haughney, E. O’Sullivan, D. McCormack, S. Corry (0-1) each.

WIT Sportsgrounds, Waterford
Referee: S Hourigan (Limerick)

7 February 2012
Quarter-final replay

Limerick	1-15- 2-13	Clare
D Hannon 0-9 (0-4f, 0-2 65s); B Gavin 1-0; M Ryan 0-2; D Moloney, G Mulcahy, M Carmody, D O’Grady, 0-1 each.	Report	P Hickey 0-6 (0-5f, 0-1 65); T Carmody 1-1; R Horan 1-0; J Conlon 0-2; B Donnellan 0-2; C Galvin, J McInerney (f), 0-1 each.

Gaelic Grounds, Limerick
Referee: D Kirwan (Cork)

=== Semi-finals ===
12 February 2012
Semi-final

Tipperary	0-26 - 1-19 (AET)	Cork
B O’Meara 0-5; E Kelly 0-4 (0-3f, 0-1 65); A Ryan 0-3; J O’Brien 0-3; P Bourke 0-3 (0-2f); J Woodlock 0-2; S Curran 0-2; G Ryan 0-2; C O’Mahony, J Ryan, 0-1 each.	Report	M O’Sullivan 1-0; C Naughton 0-3; P Cronin 0-3; B Corry 0-3; J Coughlan 0-3 (0-2f); R Cashman 0-3 (0-2f, 0-1 65); L O’Farrell 0-2; R Clifford, N McCarthy, 0-1 each.

Páirc Shíleáin, Templemore
Referee: S Hourigan (Limerick)

12 February 2012
Semi-final

Waterford	4-9 - 3-17	Clare
M O’Neill (2-6, 0-6 frees); S Prendergast (2-0); S Wash (0-2); M Shanahan (0-1, f).	Report	C Ryan (0-6, 0-5 frees); A Cunningham (1-2); C Galvin (1-1); D Keane (1-1); P O’Connor (0-2); T Carmody, P Donnellan, F Lynch, P Kelly, J Conlon (0-1) each.

Walsh Park, Waterford
Referee: J Ryan (Tipperary)

=== Final ===
4 March 2012
Final

Clare	2-12 - 1-21	Tipperary
D Keane 1-1, C Ryan 0-4fs, A Cunningham 1-0, P Donnellan, N O’Connell (3fs) 0-3 each, C Morey 0-1.	Report	J Woodlock 0-5, N McGrath (2fs) 0-4, B O’Meara 1-0, C O’Mahony (2fs, 1 65), J O’Neill 0-3 each, G Ryan, E Kelly 0-2 each, T Hammersley, A Ryan 0-1 each.

O'Garney Park, Sixmilebridge
Referee: D Kirwan (Cork)

== Top scorers ==
=== Season ===
Rank	Player	County	Tally	Total	Matches	Average
1	Declan Hannon	Limerick	1-20	23	2	11.50
1	Martin O'Neill	Waterford	3-14	23	2	11.50

=== Single game ===
Rank	Player	County	Tally	Total	Opposition
1	Declan Hannon	Limerick	1-11	14	Clare
2	Pa Bourke	Tipperary	0-13	13	Limerick Institute of Technology
3	Martin O'Neill	Waterford	2-6	12	Clare
3	Shane Brick	Kerry	0-12	12	Institute of Technology, Tralee
5	Joe Canning	Limerick Institute of Technology	1-8	11	Tipperary
5	Martin O'Neill	Waterford	1-8	11	University College Cork
7	Daire Keane	Clare	1-6	9	Waterford Institute of Technology
7	Declan Hannon	Limerick	0-9	9	Clare
9	Éamonn Brosnan	Institute of Technology, Tralee|}	1-5	8	Kerry
