= 2007–2008 Cork players' strike =

Sports labour dispute in Gaelic games

- Date: 10 December 2007 – 18 February 2008
- Location: Ireland
- Methods: Strikes and protests

From December 2007 until February 2008, a dispute between the Cork County Board and its Gaelic footballers and hurlers occurred in Ireland. It led to the footballers and hurlers refusing to play for the Cork County Board. The cause of the strike was the issue of deciding who should pick the senior teams' selectors. The players believed the manager should pick the selectors. However, the county board picked the selectors. With the appointment of Teddy Holland as manager, the players also refused to play under his tutorship since he accepted the job during their time of strike.

The strike drew comment from the Taoiseach, Bertie Ahern, and was the first time in the history of the Gaelic Athletic Association that a strike caused inter-county fixtures not to be played.

The strike was the second strike by Cork players in five years. It began on 10 December 2007 and ended on 18 February 2008 – 97 days after the first threat of strike action – and was declared over on 15 February 2008. However Holland was not fired until 18 February. Kieran Mulvey, chairman of the Labour Relations Commission, acted as arbitrator between the players and county board.

== Strike build-up ==
- 16 October: Cork clubs vote to change how selectors are picked. This is confirmed by a second vote on 20 October.
- 8 November: Billy Morgan resigns as manager because he is no longer allowed to choose selectors for his team.
- 13 November: The players issue their first threat of strike action and are supported in doing so by the Gaelic Players Association.
- 16 November: The players write to their clubs highlighting their objections to the board's decision and state that they are seeking to resolve the issue of appointing a new manager.
- 21 November: Teddy Holland is appointed as team manager along with selectors Teddy McCarthy, Liam Hodnett, Diarmuid O'Donovan and Mick O'Loughlin.
- 23 November: The footballers meet with Holland to inform him that their dispute is with the means of choosing selectors and not with his appointment.
- 24 November: The football and hurling panels plan to discuss the appointment of Teddy Holland and to threaten possible strike action.
- 3 December: Cork players' spokesman, Donal Óg Cusack, gives notice of the players intention to strike.
- 9 December: Former Cork hurling captain, Mark Landers, requests that the GAA intervene to help resolve the dispute but the GAA declare their neutrality.
- 12 December: The footballers take a team holiday (largely paid for and organised by themselves).

== Events of the strike ==
On 10 December, the players officially went on strike. The county board and the players held the first of a series of meetings to try resolve the strike ten days later. On 9 January, the hurlers confirmed they would not play in the Waterford Crystal Cup and the county was forced to give a walkover to Limerick IT.

Later in the month (23 January), Teddy Holland issued a press statement announcing he would not resign. More than 100 club delegates voted unanimously in support of Holland at a county board meeting held on 30 January. Three days earlier (27 January), in a bid to resolve their issues, the players and the county board had held 18 hours of talks, chaired by Kieran Mulvey, which ended in stalemate. Mulvey had been asked to chair the talks by Nickey Brennan, the president of the Gaelic Athletic Association.

In the week leading up to the National Football League game against Meath, the Cork county board were unable to guarantee a team would be available to play the game. Consequently, on 30 January the game was postponed. The Taoiseach, Bertie Ahern, called on both sides to resolve the dispute on 5 February and further talks between Kieran Mulvey and Páraic Duffy, the Director General of the GAA, were held.

On 7 February the players refused a solution offered by the county board and it looked likely that Cork would be removed from both the National Hurling League and National Football League and be relegated for the following season. It was claimed that under GAA rules that if a team was unable to take part in two league games that they should be disqualified from the league. A second football match was to be played on 16 February while the second hurling game was due on 17 February.

On 8 February, the Cork players reacted negatively to what they thought was an attempt by the county board to split the footballers and hurlers when a press release claimed the players would accept Holland as manager. The following day Roy Keane compared the 2002 strike to the Saipan incident and warned about players becoming too powerful. A poll showed that 56 percent of fans supported the strike and 70 percent believed the actions of the board damaged Cork's chance of winning All-Ireland championships that year.

The Cork county board, on 12 February, voted 96–13 in favour of entering binding arbitration with the players in a bid to save the teams being disqualified from the leagues and Nickey Brennan called for the dispute to end, "however it is achieved." On 14 February, the players met with Mulvey and agreed to accept the arbitration in an attempt to end the strike, then in its 95th day.

=== Outcome of the arbitration ===
The outcome of arbitration on 15 February was as follows:

- Teddy Holland and his selectors were to resign from their positions.
- The Cork players committed not to engage in future strikes.
- A new management committee would be made up of five county board members and two players.
- The new management would be able to pick their own selectors.

=== Last days of the strike ===
Many newspapers declared the strike over on 15 February after the players accepted the outcome of the arbitration and also declared that Teddy Holland had resigned. However, the GAA confirmed that the Cork-versus-Dublin football and Cork-versus-Waterford hurling games that were due to take place were to be called off.

The county board called an emergency meeting to discuss the recommendations of the arbitration and especially the recommendation from Mulvey that Holland should resign. By 16 February, uncertainty had emerged over the status of the strike. While the county board and Holland met to discuss the issues, an expected vote by the county board to remove Holland was never called. Holland meanwhile issued a statement that didn't indicate if he had stepped down and stated that he was neutral saying: I am my own man and I am proud to be a Cork football man. Holland said the claim that six people had refused the job before him was false and there was no threat of strike when he took the job. However, a statement in support of the strike had been issued by the Gaelic Players Association on 13 November 2007, a week before Holland took the job.

On 17 February it was clear Holland had not resigned or been fired by the county board and that the strike continued. The county board issued a statement saying that they would meet on Monday 18 February to end the strike. The strike officially ended on 18 February – 97 days after the first threat of strike – when, as expected, the county board voted 89–19 to fire Teddy Holland and his selectors, who refused to step down.

== Aftermath of the strike ==
The seven-man panel appointed to help find the next manager began its search as soon as Holland had been removed, and included players Nicholas Murphy and Derek Kavanagh. Conor Counihan was appointed Cork's new football manager with the right to name his own selectors. On 20 February, Seán Óg Ó hAilpín said that, had the strike carried on beyond 18 February, he and others would have resigned from inter-county hurling and football. Cork Under 21 footballer, Sean Cahalane, claimed that the Under 21 panel would not have played in place of the seniors if they had been asked by the county board.

On 19 February, the Central Competitions Control Committee (CCCC) decided not to remove Cork from the football and hurling leagues, but instead awarded the points from the missed games to their opponents and fined the county board €400 for each game missed. Kilkenny county board offered to play their hurling match with Cork and the Cork county board requested CCCC approve the game. However the CCCC had already awarded Kilkenny the point and would not allow the game to take place. It emerged that Cork couldn't have been removed from the leagues as there was no such rule.

Cork went on to win their first football and hurling matches after the strike, beating Dublin's hurlers 2–16 to 3–18 and Roscommon's footballers 0–15 to 1–14 However, the decision to award the teams that Cork did not play victory points had a knock-on effect for other teams in both leagues. Roscommon and Wexford both lodged unsuccessful appeals against the decision. Wexford's case was taken to the Disputes Resolution Authority but was rejected.

=== Hurling league controversy ===
When the National Hurling League 2008 ended, the Cork and Waterford hurling teams both finished on level points. The CCCC ruled that the teams had to play each other in a play-off and that scoring difference could not be used to separate the teams. (The play-off was to determine which team entered the semi-final and which entered the quarter-final.)

However, both Dublin and Wexford also finished on level points and, having both played Cork, the CCCC ruled the team's standings at the end of the league could be used and thus scoring difference would apply, thus relegating Wexford. This lead Wexford's chairman to accuse the GAA and the CCCC of "making the rules up as they go along".

== See also ==
- 2008–2009 Cork senior hurling team strike
