= Michael O'Brien (hurling manager) =

Irish priest, hurling coach and manager

Personal information
- Native name: Mícheál Ó Briain (Irish)
- Nickname: The Canon
- Born: 1931 Innishannon, County Cork, Ireland
- Died: 14 November 2014 (aged 81) Dromahane, County Cork, Ireland
- Occupation: Roman Catholic priest

Sport
- Sport: Hurling
Club management
- Years: Club
- Valley Rovers; Ballinhassig; Tracton; Argideen Rangers; Newcestown; Blackrock
Inter-county management
- Years: Team
- 1983–1985 1989–1993: Cork; Cork
Inter-county titles as manager
County	League	Province	All-Ireland
Cork	2	4	4

Michael G. O'Brien (1933 – 14 November 2014) was an Irish Roman Catholic priest who was also a noted hurling coach and manager.

Born in Innishannon, County Cork, O'Brien was ordained into the priesthood in 1958. Over the next forty-five years he ministered in both Ireland and the United Kingdom, while also serving as a teacher at St Finbarr's College and chaplain to the Irish Navy. O'Brien retired from active ministry in 2003.

Concurrently with his duties as a priest, O'Brien was heavily involved as a hurling coach at colleges, university, club and inter-county levels. His biggest success came with Cork, whom he steered to two All-Ireland SHC titles, four Munster SHC titles and one National Hurling League title.

== Biography ==
O'Brien was born in the parish of Innishannon/Knockavilla, County Cork. He entered St Patrick's College, Maynooth, and was ordained for the Diocese of Cork and Ross in the seminary chapel on 22 June 1958. He then ministered in the Irish-emigrant areas of London until 1961, when he returned to his home diocese and a curacy in the parish of Blackrock, Cork, where he helped to rebuild St Michael's Church which had burnt to the ground. For 12 years, from 1964 to 1976, O'Brien taught at St Finbarr's Seminary, Farranferris, where he was also the hurling trainer for the school team. He was "at the helm as Farranferris won Dr Harty Cups in 1969, 1971, 1972, 1973 and 1974, adding All-Ireland titles in 1972 and 1974". A 12-year stint as chaplain at the Naval Base of Haulbowline followed before O'Brien returned to parish ministry, again in Blackrock. In 1985, he started a lengthy stay in Carrigaline where he served as curate, administrator and finally parish priest of Carrigaline, before retiring from active ministry in 2003.

O'Brien was later resident in Nazareth Home in Dromahane. He died on 14 November 2014 after a long illness.

O'Brien served as the coach of the Cork senior hurling team on several occasions, guiding the team to All-Ireland SHC titles in 1984 and 1990. At colleges' level he also managed UCC to Fitzgibbon Cup titles, and later managed Blackrock GAA. He also helped coaching Coláiste Chríost Rí.

He is not to be confused with Canon Michael O'Brien of the neighbouring Roman Catholic Diocese of Cloyne.

== Honours ==
=== Team ===
St Finbarr's College

- Dr Croke Cup (3): 1969, 1972, 1974
- Dr Harty Cup (5): 1969, 1971, 1972, 1973, 1974

University College Cork

- Fitzgibbon Cup (10): 1981, 1982, 1983, 1984, 1985, 1986, 1987, 1988, 1990, 1991

Argideen Rangers

- Cork Junior Hurling Championship (1): 1996

Ballinhassig

- Cork Intermediate Hurling Championship (2): 1975, 1977

Blackrock

- Cork Senior Hurling Championship (2): 1985, 1999

Tracton

- Cork Intermediate Hurling Championship (1): 1991
- Cork Junior Hurling Championship (1): 1979

Cork

- All-Ireland Senior Hurling Championship (2): 1984, 1990
- Munster Senior Hurling Championship (5): 1984, 1985, 1990, 1992
- National Hurling League (1): 1992–93
- All-Ireland Junior Hurling Championship (1): 1983
- All-Ireland Minor Hurling Championship (6): 1969, 1970, 1971, 1974, 1978, 1979
- Philips Sports Manager of the Year (1): 1990

Sporting positions
Preceded by Johnny Clifford	Cork Senior Hurling Manager (jointly with Justin McCarthy); 1983–1985	Succeeded by Johnny Clifford
Preceded by Con Roche	Cork Senior Hurling Manager; 1989–1993	Succeeded by Johnny Clifford
Achievements
Preceded by Pat Henderson (Kilkenny)	All-Ireland SHC winning manager 1984	Succeeded by Dermot Healy (Offaly)
Preceded by Babs Keating (Tipperary)	All-Ireland Senior Hurling Final winning manager 1990	Succeeded by Babs Keating (Tipperary)
