= All-Ireland championships =

All-Ireland championships may refer to:

- All-Ireland Senior Camogie Championship
- All-Ireland Senior Football Championship
- All-Ireland Senior Hurling Championship
- All-Ireland Senior Ladies' Football Championship
- All-Ireland Under 21 Football Championship
- All-Ireland Under 21 Hurling Championship
- All-Ireland Minor Football Championship
- All-Ireland Minor Hurling Championship
- All-Ireland Senior Club Camogie Championship
- All-Ireland Senior Club Football Championship
- All-Ireland Senior Club Hurling Championship
