= 2015 Waterford Crystal Cup =

Hurling competition

- Dates: 10 January 2015 – 31 January 2015
- Teams: 11
- Sponsor: Waterford Crystal
- Champions: Limerick; Donal O'Grady (captain); TJ Ryan (manager)
- Runners-up: Cork; Anthony Nash (captain); Jimmy Barry-Murphy (manager)

Tournament statistics
- Matches played: 10
- Goals scored: 27 (2.7 per match)
- Points scored: 345 (34.5 per match)
- Top scorer(s): Luke O'Farrell, Cork (2-13)

The 2015 Waterford Crystal Cup was the tenth and final staging of the Waterford Crystal Cup. It was replaced by the Munster Senior Hurling League in 2016.

The Waterford Crystal Cup is a hurling competition organised by the Munster Council of the Gaelic Athletic Association for the inter-county teams and third-level institutes and universities in the province of Munster in Ireland.

The competition began on 10 January 2015 and ended on 31 January 2014. Tipperary were the defending champions.

Limerick won their second Waterford Crystal Cup after a 3-20 to 1-16 win against Cork in the final in Mallow.

== Teams ==
A total of eleven teams contested the 2015 Waterford Crystal Cup.

The following third level colleges took part.

- University College Cork (UCC)
- Limerick Institute of Technology (LIT)
- University of Limerick (UL)
- Cork Institute of Technology (CIT)
- Mary Immaculate College (Mary I)

The following county teams took part.

- Cork
- Clare
- Kerry
- Tipperary
- Limerick
- Waterford

== Fixtures ==
=== Preliminary round ===
10 January 2015 Preliminary	Cork	1-18 - 1-15	UL	CIT
	Luke O’Farrell (0-9, 0-8 frees); Dayne Lee (1-0); Paul Haughney, Stephen Moylan, Brian Lawton (0-2); Brian Murray, Peter Kelleher, Andy Walsh (0-1)	Report	Jason Forde (0-5, 0-3 frees); Conor Martin (1-2), Tony Kelly (0-3); Mark Carmody (0-2); Daire Quinn, PJ Scully (0-1); David McInerney (0-1 free)	Referee: Paul Foley (Waterford)

11 January 2015 Preliminary	Waterford	1-22 - 0-18	LIT	WIT Sports Complex, Carriganore
	Pauric Mahony (0-10, 0-8 frees); Brian O’Halloran (1-4); Gavin O’Brien, Pa Walsh, Martin O’Neill, Shane O’Sullivan, Kevin Moran, Michael Walsh, Shane Bennett, Donie Breathnach (0-1)	Report	David Reidy (0-9, 0-8 frees); Seanie O’Brien (0-3); Paul Flaherty (0-2), Alan Dempsey, David Dempsey, Patrick Fitzgerald, Barry O’Connell (0-1)

9 January 2015 Preliminary	Tipperary	4-16 - 1-16	Mary I	Dr. Morris Park, Thurles
	S Callanan (3-7, 0-4 frees, 0-1 65); D Butler (0-4); S Maher (1-1); Pádraic Maher, D Maher, C Kenny (0-1); K Bergin (0-1 free)	Report	D Reidy (0-10, 0-8 frees); N O’Meara (1-1); D O’Donovan (0-2); T Gallagher (0-2, 0-1 sideline), C Sheahan (0-1)	Referee: Nathal Wall (Cork)

=== Quarter-finals ===
18 January 2015 Quarter-final	Clare	0-16 - 0-15	Tipperary	Sixmilebridge
14:00	Cathal O’Connell (0-4 frees); Davy O’Halloran, Patrick Donnellan (0-2); Colin Ryan (0-2, 0-1 free); Aaron Cunningham, Brendan Bugler, Colm Galvin, Conor Ryan, Bobby Duggan, Paul Flanagan (0-1)	Report	Brendan Maher (0-7, 0-5 frees); Sean Maher, Denis Maher (0-2); Gearoid Ryan, Tom Stapleton, David Butler, Shane McGrath (0-1)	Referee: Johnny Murphy (Limerick)

17 January 2015 Quarter-final	Cork	4-15 - 1-13	CIT	CIT
14:00	Darren McCarthy (2-2); Paudie O’Sullivan (0-5, 0-3 frees); Stephen Moylan (1-2); Daniel Kearney (1-0); Dayne Lee, Paul Haughney (0-2); Patrick Cronin, Séamus Harnedy (0-1)	Report	Daire Lordan (0-4, 0-3 frees); Kevin Kavanagh (1-0); John O’Dwyer, Seán O’Mahony, Conor Hammersley (0-2); William Murphy, John Cronin, Bill Cooper (0-1)	Referee: John McCormack (Tipperary)

17 January 2015 Quarter-final	Limerick	2-15 1-15	Waterford	FitzGerald Park, Kilmallock
14:00	Adrian Breen (1-2); Cian Lynch (0-3); Cathal King, Donal O’Grady (0-2); Thomas O’Brien, Tom Morrissey (0-2, 0-1 free); Dan Morrissey (0-1); Shane Dowling (0-1 free)	Report	Martin O’Neill (0-8, 0-6frees); Jake Dillon (1-3, 0-3 frees); Thomas Connors (0-2); Shane O’Sullivan, Shane Bennett (0-1)	Referee: Damien Fox (Clare)

17 January 2015 Quarter-final	UCC	2-23 - 2-14	Kerry	Austin Stack Park, Tralee
13:30	A Cadogan (0-6); B Lawton (0-6, 0-3 frees); R O'Shea (0-4, 0-2 frees); E Finn (0-4), S O'Keeffe, B Hartnett (1-0); K Burke (0-2), M Breen (0-1)	Report	S Nolan (0-8, 0-6 frees); A Royle (1-1), P Boyle (1-0); M O'Leary (0-3); C Harty (0-2)	Referee: Jason Mullins (Limerick)

=== Semi-finals ===
24 January 2015 Semi-final	Cork	2-21 - 0-18	Clare	Mallow
13:00	Luke O’Farrell (2-3); Cian McCarthy (0-7, 0-3 frees, 0-2 65s); Stephen Moylan, Andy Walsh (0-2); Brian Murray, Peter Kelleher, Brian Lawton, Darren McCarthy, Dayne Lee, Paul Haughney, Alan Frahill-O’Connor (0-1)	Report	Cathal O’Connell (0-4, 0-3 frees); Bobby Duggan (0-4); Colin Ryan (0-3, 0-1 frees); Brendan Bugler (0-3); Patrick Donnellan (0-2); Shane Golden, Daire Keane (0-1)	Referee: Paul Foley (Waterford)

24 January 2015 Semi-final	Limerick	0-22 - 1-17	UCC	FitzGerald Park, Kilmallock
14:00	Shane Dowling (0-4, 0-2 frees); Thomas O’Brien (0-4 frees); Adrian Breen (0-3); Conor Allis (0-2, 0-1 free); Cian Lynch, James Ryan (0-2); Niall Moran, Cathal King, Tom Morrissey, Paul Browne, Patrick Begley (0-1)	Report	Conor Lehane (0-6, 0-3 frees); Rob O’Shea (0-4, 0-3 frees); DJ Foran (1-0); Alan Cadogan, Stephen O’Keeffe (0-2); Shane O’Donnell, Daniel Roche (0-1), Paudie Prendergast (0-1 free)	Referee: Pat Casey (Waterford)

=== Final ===
31 January 2015 Final	Limerick	3-20 - 1-16	Cork	Mallow
19:00	Adrian Breen (2-3); Gavin O’Mahony (1-2); Cian Lynch (0-4); Tom Condon (0-3); James Ryan, Cathal King, Tom Morrissey (0-2); Niall Moran, Shane Dowling (0-1)	Report	Cian McCarthy (0-8, 0-3 frees); Stephen Moylan (1-0); Paul Haughney, Andy Walsh (0-2); Brian Lawton, Brian Murray, Luke O’Farrell, Patrick Horgan (0-01)	Referee: Johnny Ryan (Tipperary)
