= Ciarán McGann =

Irish hurler

Ciarán McGann is an Irish hurler from Castlelyons in County Cork. He plays with the local Castlelyons club and with the Cork senior inter-county team. He has appeared for Cork as a half-back and as a half-forward.

== Playing career ==
McGann has been a member of the Cork squad for the National Hurling League and All-Ireland Senior Hurling Championship since 2006, though he has never established himself as a regular starter. Along with five other members of the Cork squad for the All-Ireland Senior Hurling Championship 2006 final, McGann was not selected in the 2007 squad by manager Gerald McCarthy. However, he was part of the Cork set-up in 2008, impressing McCarthy at centre-back in the run-up to the Munster Senior Hurling Championship.
