= Craig Leahy =

Irish hurler

Personal information
- Native name: Craig Ó Laocha (Irish)
- Nickname: Nailer
- Born: 1 September 1989 (age 37) Glanmire, County Cork, Ireland
- Occupation: Piping designer
- Height: 6 ft 2 in (188 cm)

Sport
- Sport: Hurling
- Position: Full-back
Club
- Years: Club
- 2008–: Sarsfields
Club titles
- Cork titles: 5
- Munster titles: 1
College
- Years: College
- Cork Institute of Technology
College titles
- Fitzgibbon titles: 0
Inter-county
Years	County	Apps (scores)
2008–2009	Cork	0 (0–0)
Inter-county titles
- Munster titles: 0
- All-Irelands: 0
- NHL: 0
- All Stars: 0

Craig Leahy (born 1 September 1989) is an Irish hurler. At club level he plays with Sarsfields and at inter-county level he has played at various levels with Cork.

== Career ==
Leahy was a "late starter" to hurling and only started playing at the age of 12. He played as a student at Glanmire Community College and lined out in all grades during his time there. Leahy later studied at Cork Institute of Technology and played in the Fitzgibbon Cup.

At club level, Leahy first played for Sarsfields at juvenile and underage levels. He won a Cork Premier MHC medal in 2007 before making his senior team debut a year later. Leahy won his first Cork SHC medal in 2008 before claiming further winners' medals in 2010, 2012, 2014 and 2023. He added a Munster Club SHC medal to his collection in 2024.

Leahy first appeared on the inter-county scene for Cork as a substitute on the minor team beaten by Tipperary in the 2007 All-Ireland minor final. He earned a call-up to the Cork senior hurling team in 2009, at a time when the majority of the team's regular players were on strike. Leahy lined out in Cork's first three National Hurling League games before the strike ended.

== Honours ==
Sarsfields

- Munster Senior Club Hurling Championship: 2024
- Cork Premier Senior Hurling Championship: 2008, 2010, 2012, 2014, 2023
- Cork Premier Minor Hurling Championship: 2007
