= Aidan Ryan (Cork hurler) =

Cork hurler

Personal information
- Native name: Aodán Ó Riain (Irish)
- Born: 4 February 1986 (age 40) Midleton, County Cork, Ireland
- Height: 1.91 m (6 ft 3 in)

Sport
- Sport: Hurling
- Position: Full-back
Club
- Years: Club
- Midleton
Club titles
- Cork titles: 1
Inter-county
- Years: County
- 2009–2015: Cork
Inter-county titles
- Munster titles: 0
- All-Irelands: 0
- NHL: 0
- All Stars: 0

Aidan Ryan (born 4 February 1986) is an Irish sportsman. He plays hurling with his local club Midleton and has been a member of the Cork senior team since 2009, when he was called up due to the 2008-2009 Cork players strike. Ryan also played under 21 for Cork during the 2006 and 2007 season

== Honours ==
Midleton

- Cork Senior Hurling Championship: 2013
