= Robert O'Driscoll =

Irish hurler

Robert O' Driscoll (born 20 February 1989) is an Irish hurler who played at right corner-forward for the Cork senior team, under 21 team and minor team.

Born in Glanmire, County Cork, O'Driscoll first arrived on the inter-county scene at the age of 18 when he first linked up with the Cork minor team, losing to Tipperary in the Munster final and then at 19 was called up to the Cork Under 21 team . He made his senior debut in the 2009 National Hurling League. O'Driscoll has since gone on to play with Cork Seniors in 2009; however, he has enjoyed little success in terms of silverware.

At club level O'Driscoll plays with Sarsfields and has won three championship medals and one county minor medal .

== Career ==
=== Club ===
O'Driscoll plays his club hurling with Sarsfields and has experienced success.

On 28 September 2008, he lined out in his first senior championship decider, with Bride Rovers providing the opposition. A goal by O'Driscoll with seven minutes of normal time left proved the decisive score as Sarsfield's claimed a 2–14 to 2–13 victory. It was O'Driscoll's first championship medal.

After surrendering their championship crown to Newtownshandrum in 2009, Sarsfields reached a third successive championship decider on 10 October 2010. Glen Rovers, who were playing in their first championship decider in nineteen years, provided the opposition. Michael Cussen set up Kieran Murphy for a key point late in the game. A narrow 1–17 to 0–18 victory gave O'Driscoll a second championship medal.

Sarsfields failed to retain the title once again; however, on 7 October 2012 O'Driscoll lined out in his fourth championship decider in five years. Sars were the more experienced side, as Bishopstown were the surprise finalists. In spite of this, it took a late goal from O'Driscoll to secure a 1–15 to 1–13 victory.

=== Inter-county ===
O'Driscoll first came to prominence on the inter-county scene as a member of the so-called Cork "development panel" in late 2008.This new team came into being as a result of the 2008 hurling panel's refusal to play under manager Gerald McCarthy. O'Driscoll first lined out for Cork in a challenge game to celebrate the 150th anniversary of St. Colman's College. On that occasion the new Cork team defeated a star-studded St. Colman's team, which featured many Cork stars of the past.

After making his competitive debut in a 4–14 to 1–14 defeat by Dublin in the opening round of the 2009 National Hurling League .

The resignation of Gerald McCarthy as manager resulted in the 2008 panel returning to the inter-county set-up. O Driscoll has been a member of the extended on extended cork senior panel.
