= John Considine (hurler) =

Cork player

Personal information
- Native name: Seán Mac Consaidín (Irish)
- Born: 26 October 1964 (age 62) Glanmire, County Cork, Ireland
- Height: 5 ft 10 in (178 cm)

Sport
- Sport: Hurling
- Position: Right corner-back
Club
- Years: Club
- Sarsfields
Club titles
- Cork titles: 0
College
- Years: College
- University College Cork
College titles
- Fitzgibbon titles: 4
Inter-county*
| Years | County | Apps (scores) |
| 1988–1993 | Cork | 8 (0–0) |
Inter-county titles
- Munster titles: 1
- All-Irelands: 1
- NHL: 1
- All Stars: 1
- *Inter County team apps and scores correct as of 11:37, 8 July 2015.

John Considine (born 26 October 1964) is an Irish former hurler who played as a right corner-back at senior level for the Cork county team.

Born in Glanmire, Cork, Considine first played competitive hurling during his schooling at Sullivan's Quay CBS. He arrived on the inter-county scene at the age of twenty-one when he first linked up with the Cork under-21 team. He joined the senior panel during the 1988 championship. Considine subsequently became a regular member of the starting fifteen and won one All-Ireland medal, one Munster medal and one National Hurling League medal.

Considine played his club hurling with Sarsfields.

Throughout his career Considine made 8 championship appearances. His retirement came following the conclusion of the 1993 championship.

In retirement from playing Considine became involved in team management and coaching. After being heavily involved in coaching at University College Cork, he later took charge as manager of the Cork minor, under-21 and senior teams.

== Playing career ==
=== University ===
In 1987 Considine was at left wing-back on the University College Cork team that reached the final of the inert-varsities championship. Fierce rivals University College Dublin provided the opposition, however, a narrow 1-11 to 0-11 victory gave Considine a first Fitzgibbon Cup medal.

Considine was included on the University College Cork team once again in 1988. A convincing 1-14 to 1-3 defeat of University College Galway secured a remarkable eight successive title for UCC and a second successive Fitzgibbon Cup medal for Considine.

Nine-in-a-row proved beyond UCC, however, the team lined out in yet another decider in 1990. A 3-10 to 0-12 defeat of the Waterford Institute of Technology gave Considine a third Fitzgibbon Cup medal.

Considine won a fourth and final Fitzgibbon Cup medal in 1991 as UCC defeated University College Dublin by 1-14 to 1-6.

=== Club ===
Considine played his club hurling with his local Sarsfields club. He was part of the Sarsfields squad that, in 1989, qualified for the final of the county senior championship. A high-scoring game ensued against Glen Rovers, however, at full-time Considine ended up on the defeated team.

=== Inter-county ===
Considine first came to prominence with Cork as an unused substitute with the under-21 team during the team's unsuccessful championship campaign in 1985.

Three years later in 1988 Considine was added to the Cork senior panel, however, he was dropped the following year.

Considine made his senior championship debut on 20 May 1990 in a 3-17 to 3-7 Munster quarter-final defeat of Kerry. He later won a Munster medal that year following a 4-16 to 2-14 defeat of Tipperary. The subsequent All-Ireland final on 2 September 1990 pitted Cork against Galway for the second time in four years. Galway were once again the red-hot favourites and justified this tag by going seven points ahead in the opening thirty-five minutes thanks to a masterful display by Joe Cooney. Cork fought back with an equally expert display by captain Tomás Mulcahy. The game was effectively decided on an incident which occurred midway through the second half when Cork goalkeeper Ger Cunningham blocked a point-blank shot from Martin Naughton with his nose. The umpires gave no 65-metre free, even though he clearly deflected it out wide. Cork went on to win a high-scoring and open game of hurling by 5–15 to 2–21. As well as winning an All-Ireland medal Considine was later presented with a first All-Star.

Cork surrendered their All-Ireland crown to Tipperary in 1991, while Considine played no part with the team the following year.

Considine won a National Hurling League medal in 1993 following a 3-11 to 1-12 defeat of Wexford. After a subsequent unsuccessful championship campaign he left the inert-county scene.

== Coaching career ==
Considine was appointed caretaker manager of the Cork senior hurling team on 12 March 2009 He succeeded Gerald McCarthy and defeated Dónal O'Grady for the position. In his first match as manager the team beat Clare with a score of 2-14 to 0-16. In his second and final game in charge, Cork defeated Limerick 1-20 to 2-16. Considine left the post as the only Cork manager in history to record a 100% success rate. He was also Cork camogie manager.

== Honours ==
=== Player ===
University College Cork

- Fitzgibbon Cup (4): 1987, 1988, 1990, 1991

Cork

- All-Ireland Senior Hurling Championship (1): 1990
- Munster Senior Hurling Championship (1): 1990
- National Hurling League (1): 1992-93

=== Individual ===
Honours

- All-Star (1): 1990

Sporting positions
| Preceded by Denis Ring | Cork Under-21 Hurling Manager; 2007–2009 | Succeeded by Ger FitzGerald |
| Preceded by Gerald McCarthy | Cork Senior Hurling Manager; 2009 | Succeeded by Denis Walsh |
| Preceded by Ger Manley | Cork Minor Hurling Manager; 2009–2011 | Succeeded by Pat Kenneally |
| Preceded by Denis Ring | Cork Minor Hurling Manager; 2017–2019 | Succeeded by Donal Óg Cusack |
