= Bertie Troy =

Irish hurling manager

Canon Bertie Troy
Personal information
- Born: 1930 Newtownshandrum, County Cork
- Died: 28 January 2007 Midleton, County Cork
- Occupation: Roman Catholic priest

Sport
- Sport: Hurling
Inter-county management
- Years: Team
- 1975–1980: Cork
Inter-county titles as manager
County	League	Province	All-Ireland
Cork	3	5	5

Bartholomew J. Troy (1930 – 28 January 2007), known as Father Bertie Troy and later as Canon Bertie Troy, was a Roman Catholic priest and an All-Ireland Hurling Final winning manager with Cork.

Troy was born in Newtownshandrum, County Cork in 1930, the son of Ellen (née Flannery) and Richard Troy, He was educated and the local national school and later at St Colman’s College in Fermoy. While he studied here Troy became involved in Gaelic games, particularly the college hurling team. He was a member of the college team that won their first Dr Harty Cup title in 1948. Troy later studied for the priesthood in Maynooth and was ordained for the Diocese of Cloyne in 1955 by Archbishop McQuaid in Dublin. Following his ordination he served in England for a year before returning to Ireland to serve as a priest in the parishes of Carrigtwohill, Ballycotton and Kanturk. He also worked as a teacher at St Colman’s College for twenty-five years. Troy later served as parish priest in Midleton between 1991 and his retirement in 2005.

== Managerial career ==
Troy was also hugely involved as a selector and a coach with a range of Cork hurling teams at all levels. In the mid-1960s he became involved with the Cork minor hurling side. He coached the team to win six Munster titles in-a-row between 1966 and 1971. These provincial wins were converted into four All-Ireland titles in the same period. During the same period Troy was hugely involved with Cork’s under-21 hurlers. He guided them to a record four Munster and four All-Ireland titles in-a-row between 1968 and 1971. Many of the players that he coached at these levels went on to form the backbone of the Cork senior team in the mid-1970s.

=== Cork ===
In 1975 Troy was joint-coach of the senior hurling team with Justin McCarthy, before being appointed coach/manager in his own right the following year. In this capacity he steered the team to a record five Munster titles in-a-row. These were converted into a remarkable three All-Ireland titles in-a-row in 1976, 1977 and 1978, thus making Troy one of the most successful managers of the modern era.

In retirement from coaching he maintained a keen interest in Cork’s hurling fortunes. Canon Bertie Troy died on 28 January 2007.

Sporting positions
Preceded by ?	Cork Senior Hurling Manager; 1975-1980	Succeeded by Gerald McCarthy
Achievements
Preceded by Fr. Tommy Maher (Kilkenny)	All-Ireland SHC winning manager 1976 - 1978	Succeeded by Pat Henderson/Eddie Keher (Kilkenny)
