= Waterford Crystal Cup =

Annual hurling competition

- Irish: Craobh Chriostail Phort Láirge
- Code: Hurling
- Founded: 2006
- Abolished: 2015
- Region: Munster (GAA)
- No. of teams: 11
- Last Title holders: Limerick (2nd title)
- First winner: Limerick
- Most titles: Tipperary (4 titles)
- Sponsors: Waterford Crystal
- TV partner: TG4

The Waterford Crystal Cup was an annual hurling competition organised by the Munster Council of the Gaelic Athletic Association from 2006 to 2015 for the top inter-county teams and third-level institutes and universities in the province of Munster in Ireland.

The series of games were played during January and February. The prize for the winning team is a special piece of glassware donated by Waterford Crystal. This cup competition was always been played on a straight knockout basis whereby once a team loses they are eliminated from the series of games.

The Waterford Crystal Cup was effectively a pre-season tournament. It allowed teams to blood new players and to experiment prior to the opening of the National Hurling League (for county teams) or Fitzgibbon Cup (for third-level teams).

== History ==
The Waterford Crystal Cup was played for the first time in 2006. It replaced the informal Waterford Crystal South-East Hurling League which had been running since 1996 and was the brainchild of the Waterford County Board.

In 2016 it was replaced by the Munster Senior Hurling League, which only admits county teams.

== Format ==
The Waterford Crystal Cup is a knockout tournament with pairings drawn at random - there are no seeds.

Each match is played as a single leg. If a match is drawn a period of extra-time is played, however, if both sides are still level at the end a second replay takes place and so on until a winner is found.

== Roll of honour ==
Team	Wins	Years won
Tipperary	4	2007, 2008, 2012, 2014
Limerick	2	2006, 2015
Clare	2	2009, 2013
Waterford	2	2010, 2011

== List of finals ==
Year	Winners		Runners-up		Winning captain	Venue
Year	County	Score	County	Score	Winning captain	Venue
2016–present	Counties now compete in the Munster Senior Hurling League					
2015	Limerick	3-20	Cork	1-16	Donal O'Grady	Mallow
2014	Tipperary	4-22	Clare	3-11	James Woodlock	Gaelic Grounds
2013	Clare	1-21	Tipperary	1-13	Patrick Donnellan	Semple Stadium
2012	Tipperary	1-21	Clare	2-12	Brendan Cummins	O'Garney Park
2011	Waterford	0-21	Cork	0-16	Stephen Molumphy	Páirc Uí Rinn
2010	Waterford	1-9	University College Cork	0-11	Declan Prendergast	Fraher Field
2009	Clare	1-12	Tipperary	1-07	Gerry O'Grady	Páirc Uí Stuairt
2008	Tipperary	3-13	Waterford	0-13	Eoin Kelly	Páirc Shíleáin
2007	Tipperary	1-17	Cork	2-11	Brendan Cummins	Páirc Uí Chaoimh
2006	Limerick	1-19	Waterford Institute of Technology	3-10	T. J Ryan	Gaelic Grounds
