= SETU Waterford GAA =

Gaelic games club in County Waterford, Ireland

South East Technological University Waterford GAA
- CLG Ollscoil Teicneolaíochta an Oirdheiscirt, Port Láirge
- Founded: 1981
- County: Waterford
- Colours: Blue
- Grounds: Waterford

Playing kits
Standard colours

South East Technological University Waterford GAA or SETU Waterford GAA is a Gaelic Athletic Association (GAA) club located in the South East Technological University, Waterford, County Waterford, Ireland. Its hurling team has played in the Fitzgibbon Cup and Waterford Crystal Cup as well as Higher Education Leagues. Its football team has played in the Sigerson Cup and McGrath Cup as well as Higher Education Leagues. Its camogie team competed in the Ashbourne Cup. The ladies Gaelic football team has previously contested the O'Connor Cup.

== History ==
In 1981, SETU Waterford GAA (formerly Waterford IT GAA) consisted of one hurling team playing in Division 3. By 2009, it had sixteen teams competing in twenty-two competitions in the third-level education sector.

Teams from SETU Waterford GAA have won dozens of titles, including: Division 1 hurling titles, Fitzgibbon Cup trophies, Fresher 1 and Fresher 2 All-Irelands, Ashbourne Cup, Purcell Cups, Division 1 leagues and several other men's and Ladies' football titles.

Titles won in the 21st century include the Fitzgibbon cup in 2003, 2004 and 2006, the Ashbourne cup in 2001, fresher Camogie All-Ireland in 2005, the Division 3 Ladies football title in 2003, the fresher hurling All-Ireland in 2006 and the fresher hurling and Camogie All-Ireland shield in 2007.

== Honours ==
Competition	Wins	Years won	Last final lost
Sigerson Cup	0	—N/a	—N/a
Fitzgibbon Cup	9	1992, 1995, 1999, 2000, 2003, 2004, 2006, 2008, 2014	2010
O'Connor Cup	1	1989	2000
Waterford Crystal Cup	0	—N/a	

== Notable players ==
- Declan Browne
- Éamonn Corcoran
- Jake Dillon
- Brian Dowling
- Tommy Dunne
- Harry Kehoe
- Pauric Mahony
- Eoin Murphy
- Gavin O'Brien
- Stephen O'Keeffe
- Eoin Reid
- T. J. Reid
- Keith Rossiter
- Henry Shefflin
