= 2008–2009 Cork senior hurling team strike =

Strike by Irish sports team

The 2008–2009 Cork senior hurling team strike was a withdrawal of playing services by the 2008 Cork senior hurling team over the issue of team management. The strike marked the third such strike in five years with the 2007–2008 Cork players' strike being the most recent. Reports of unrest within Cork began at least as early as 4 November 2008 when the manager Gerald McCarthy played down talk of unrest in the panel.

== January ==
In January the 2008 panel issued a statement outlining their reasons for striking, primarily claiming the Cork County Board was not following the processed agreed in the aftermath of the 2007–2008 strike. The statement was signed by the goalkeeper, Dónal Óg Cusack, on behalf of the 2008 squad.

== February ==
With the strike ongoing the Cork county board fielding a team made up of players who were not involved in the 2008 panel. While an estimated 10,000 marched in support of the striking hurlers. The Cork footballers have said they will join the Hurlers on strike if the matter is not settled by the end of the National Football League. While the Hurlers asked the clubs of Cork too put a motion of no confidence in Gerald McCarthy before the county board.

== March ==
On 1 March 2009, Cork management were forced to field an understrength side that was defeated by Galway by 14 points in front of crowd of only 600 their third defeat in a row.

On 5 March 2009, Na Piarsaigh became one of many clubs to support the hurlers.

On 10 March 2009, Gerald McCarthy confirmed that he would be stepping down as Cork hurling manager with immediate effect after reported death threats.
