= Cathal =

- Pronunciation: English: /ˈkɒhəl/ Irish: [ˈkahəlˠ]
- Gender: Masculine
- Language: Irish; Scottish Gaelic; English

Origin
- Language: Celtic
- Derivation: cath + val
- Meaning: "battle" + "ruler"

Other names
- Pet name: Cathalán
- See also: Cathal, Cathel, Cahal, Charles, Cahill, Kathel

Cathal is a common given name in Ireland. The name is derived from two Celtic elements: the first, cath, means "battle"; the second element, val, means "rule". There is no feminine form of Cathal. The Gaelic name has several anglicised forms, such as Cathel, Cahal, Cahill and Kathel. It has also been anglicised as Charles, although this name is of an entirely different origin as it is derived from a Germanic element, karl, meaning "free man".

As is evident from the list below, the name was, in medieval times, most popular in Ireland's two western provinces, Munster and Connacht.

== People with the name ==
=== Pre-19th century ===
- St. Cathal of Taranto (died 685), archbishop
- Cathal mac Áedo (died 627), king of Munster
- Cathal Cú-cen-máthair (died 665), king of Munster
- Cathal mac Muiredaig (died 735), king of Connacht
- Cathal mac Finguine (died 742), king of Munster
- Cathal mac Murchadh (died 816), king of Uí Maine
- Cathal mac Conchobair (died 925), king of Connacht
- Cathal mac Tadg (died 973), king of Connacht
- Cathal mac Donnubáin (fl. 1014), king of Uí Chairpre Áebda
- Cathal Crobhdearg Ua Conchobair (died 1224), king of Connacht
- Cathal mac Conchobair Ruadh Ua Conchobair (died 1288), king of Connacht
- Cathal mac Domhnall Ua Conchobair (died 1324), king of Connacht
- Cathal Óg Mac Maghnusa (died 1498), main compiler of the Annals of Ulster
- Cathal Buí Mac Giolla Ghunna (died 1756), poet

=== Later ===
- Cathal Barrett (born 1993), Irish hurler who plays for Tipperary
- Cathal Berry, Irish Independent politician, former Irish Army officer and medical doctor who has been a Teachta Dála (TD) for the Kildare South
- Cathal Black, Irish film director, writer, and producer
- Cathal Breslin (born 1978), concert pianist from Northern Ireland
- Cathal Brugha (died 1922), revolutionary
- Cahal Carvill (born 1987), Northern Irish hurler
- Cathal Coughlan (musician) (1960-2022), singer and musician with the bands Microdisney and the Fatima Mansions
- Cathal Casey (born 1967), Irish retired hurler
- Cathal Corey, Gaelic football manager and former player
- Cathal Crowe, (born 1982), Irish Fianna Fáil politician
- Cahal Daly (1917–2009), Roman Catholic Archbishop of Armagh and Primate of All Ireland from 1990 to 1996
- Cathal Daniels (born 1996), Irish eventing rider.
- Cathal J. Dodd (born 1956), singer and voice actor
- Cathal Dunbar (born 1996), Irish hurler who plays for Wexford Senior Championship
- Cathal Dunne (born 1951), singer, represented Ireland in Eurovision Song Contest 1979
- Cathal Gannon (1910–1999), Irish harpsichord maker, a fortepiano restorer and an amateur horologist
- Cathal Óg Greene (born 1987), Gaelic footballer for London
- Cathal Hayden, Northern Irish fiddle and banjo player of note.
- Cathal Magee (born 1954), Chief Executive Officer of the Health Service Executive (HSE) in Ireland (2010–2012)
- Cathal Mannion (born 1994), Irish hurler who plays for Galway Senior Championship
- Cathal Mac Coille (born 1952), retired Irish broadcaster, researcher and journalist
- Cathal MacSwiney Brugha (born 1949), Irish decision scientist, the Emeritus Professor of Decision Analytics at University College Dublin's College of Business
- Cathal McCabe (born 1963)
- Cathal McCarron, All Ireland Winning Gaelic footballer for Tyrone.
- Cathal McCarthy (born 2006), Irish footballer for UCD and Hull City
- Cathal McConnell (born 1944), musician and singer
- Cathal McInerney, Irish sportsperson
- Cathal Naughton (born 1987), Irish retired hurler who played for Cork Senior Championship
- Cathal Kelly, Canadian writer
- Cathal O'Connell, Irish hurler who plays as a forward for the Clare senior team.
- Cathal Ó Murchadha, born Charles Murphy (1880–1958), Irish politician and republican
- Cathal Ó Searcaigh (born 1956), poet
- Cathal Ó Sándair, born Charles Saunders was one of the most prolific Irish language authors of the 20th century
- Cathal O'Shannon (1928–2011), Irish journalist and television presenter
- Cathal Parlon (born 1986), Irish hurler
- Cathal Pendred (born 1987), retired mixed martial artist*
- Cathal Ryan, Gaelic footballer from County Laois.
- Cathal Smyth (born 1959), singer and songwriter, better known as Chas Smash of the British band Madness

== Places ==
- Cathal Brugha Street, street on the northside of Dublin, Ireland.
- Cathal Brugha Barracks, Irish Army barracks in Rathmines, Dublin

== See also ==
- List of Irish-language given names
- Cadwallon (disambiguation)
