= Cahal =

Cahal may refer to:

- Cahal Avenue, East Nashville, Tennessee
- Cahal Pech, a Mayan site in Belize
- Cahal Pech Village Resort, a hotel in Belize

== People with the surname ==
- Terry H. Cahal (1802–1851), American politician

== People with the given name ==
- Cahal Carvill (born 1987), Northern Irish hurler
- Cahal Daly (1917–2009), Irish philosopher
- Cahal Dunne (born 1951), Irish singer

== See also ==
- Cathal, a surname
