= 2016 National Hurling League =

85th season of the National Hurling League

National Hurling League 2016
League details
- Dates: 13 February – 8 May 2016
- Teams: 34

League champions
- Winners: Clare (4th win)
- Captain: Tony Kelly & Cian Dillon
- Manager: Davy Fitzgerald

League runners-up
- Runners-up: Waterford
- Captain: Kevin Moran
- Manager: Derek McGrath

Other division winners
- Division 1B: Clare
- Division 2A: Westmeath
- Division 2B: Armagh
- Division 3A: Roscommon
- Division 3B: Fermanagh

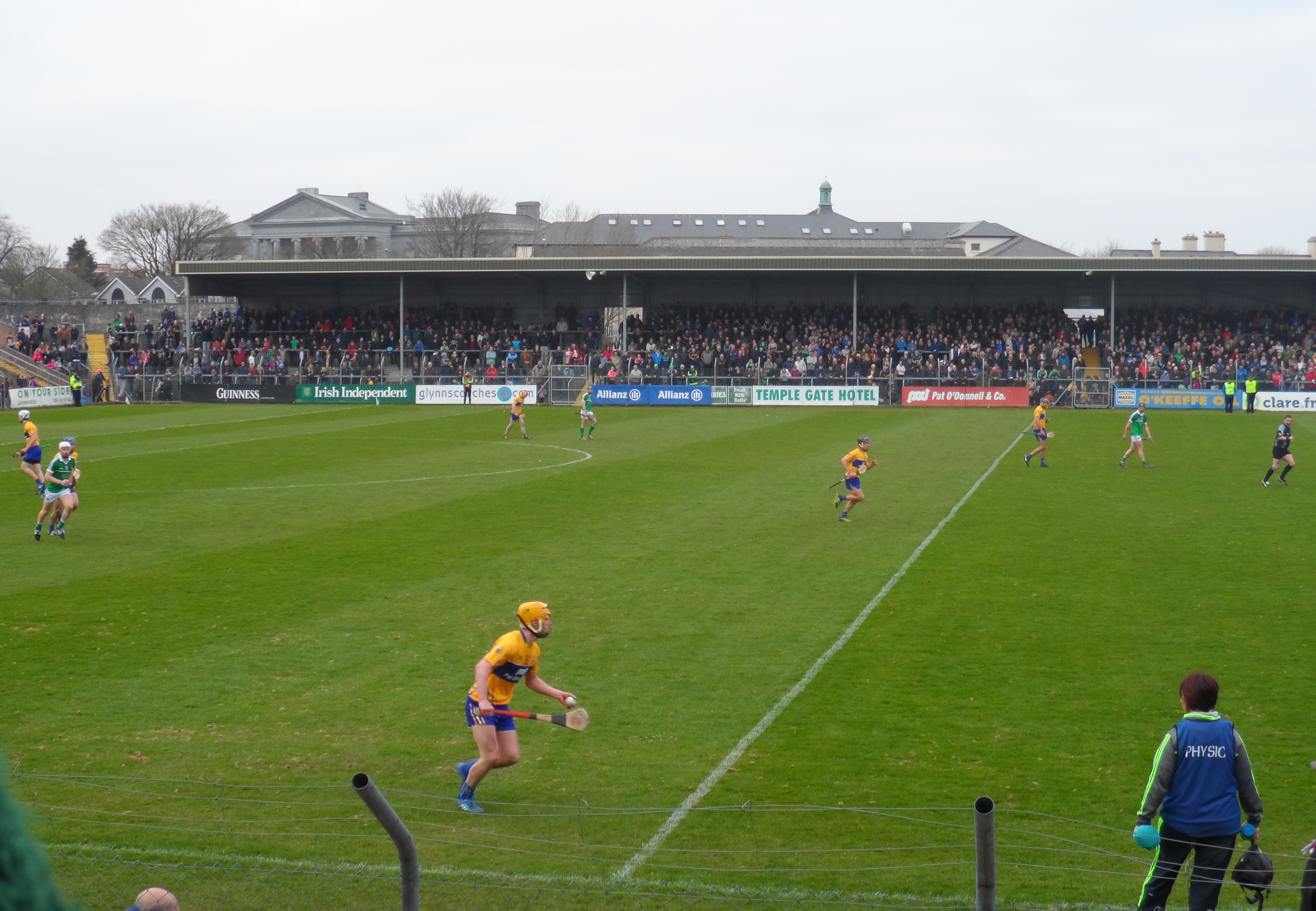
Clare v. Limerick (Division 1B, 20 March 2016)

The 2016 National Hurling League was the 85th season of the National Hurling League for inter-county hurling teams since its establishment in 1925. The fixtures were announced on 16 November 2015. The season began on 13 February 2016, and finished on 8 May 2016.

Waterford came into the season as defending champions of the 2015 season. Kerry entered Division 1 as the promoted team from the 2015 season.

Clare won the title for the first time since 1978 after a 1-23 to 2-19 win against Waterford in a replay.

== Format ==
League structure

Thirty four teams compete in the 2016 NHL – six teams in the top five divisions (Divisions 1A, 1B, 2A, 2B & 3A) and four teams in Division 3B. Thirty one county teams from Ireland take part (Cavan do not). Fingal, London and Warwickshire complete the lineup.

Each team plays all the other teams in their division once, either home or away. 2 points are awarded for a win, and 1 for a draw.

Tie-breaker

- If only two teams are level on league points, the team that won the head-to-head match is ranked ahead. If this game was a draw, score difference (total scored minus total conceded in all games) is used to rank the teams.
- If three or more teams are level on league points, score difference is used to rank them.

Finals, promotions and relegations

- Division 1A
  - The top four teams qualify for the Division 1 quarter-finals
  - The bottom two teams meet in a relegation play-off, with the loser relegated to Division 1B
- Division 1B
  - The top 2 teams are promoted to Division 1A and qualify for the Division 1 quarter-finals
  - Teams ranked 2, 3 & 4 qualify for the Division 1 quarter-finals
  - The bottom two teams meet in a play-off, with the loser playing a relegation/promotion match against the Division 2A champions
- Division 2A
  - The top two teams meet in Division 2A final, with both teams being promoted
  - The bottom team is relegated to Division 2B
- Division 2B
  - The top two teams meet in Division 2B final, with both being promoted
  - The bottom two teams meet in a play-off, with the loser playing a relegation/promotion match against the Division 3A champions
- Division 3A
  - The top two teams meet in Division 3A final, with both being promoted
  - The second bottom team play a relegation/promotion match against the Division 3B champions
  - The bottom team is relegated to Division 3B
- Division 3B
  - The top two teams meet in Division 3B final, with both being promoted

== Division 1A ==
National Hurling League Division 1
- Season: 2016
- Matches: 41
- Top goalscorer: T. J. Reid (2-61)
- Biggest home win: Limerick 6-29 - 1-12 Laois (12 March 2016)
- Biggest away win: Wexford 2-25 - 0-8 Kerry (6 March 2016)
- Highest scoring: Limerick 6-29 - 1-12 Laois (12 March 2016)
- All statistics correct as of 8 May 2016.

Waterford came into the season as defending champions of the 2015 season. Kerry entered Division 1 as the promoted team.

On 8 May 2016, Clare won the title following a 1-23 to 2-19 win over Waterford in a replay of the final. It was their first league title since 1978 and their fourth National League title overall.

Galway, who actually finished above Cork, were relegated from Division 1A after losing the relegation play-off to Cork by 2-22 to 0-25. Clare, who were undefeated in Division 1B, secured promotion to the top tier.

Kilkenny's T. J. Reid was the Division 1 top scorer with 2-61. Clare's Patrick Kelly was the top goalkeeper having kept 4 clean sheets.

=== Structure ===
The 12 teams in Division 1 were divided into two groups of six teams named Division 1A and Division 1B. Each team played all the others in its group once. Two points were awarded for a win and 1 for a draw. The first four teams in 1A and 1B advanced to the league quarter-finals with the top team in Division 1A playing the fourth team in Division 1B, the second team in Division 1A playing the third in Division 1B, etc.

=== Division 1A Table ===
NHL runners-up Relegated team

Team	Pld	W	D	L	F	A	Diff	Pts
Kilkenny	5	4	0	1	4-94	4-82	12	8
Waterford	5	3	1	1	1-90	3-81	3	7
Dublin	5	3	0	2	6-83	3-90	2	6
Tipperary	5	2	1	2	5-107	7-81	20	5
Galway	5	1	2	2	5-94	3-105	-5	4
Cork	5	0	0	5	8-89	9-118	-32	0

=== Division 1A Rounds 1 to 5 ===
13 February 2016; 19:00; Round 1	Tipperary	1-23 - 0-12	Dublin	Semple Stadium; Attendance: 5,105; Referee: C Lyons (Cork)
13 February 2016; 19:00; Round 1	J Forde (1-5), J McGrath (0-7, 5f), C Kenny (0-3), J O’Dwyer (0-3), Padraic Maher (0-2), N McGrath (0-2), D Fitzelle (0-1).	Report	D Treacy (0-3f), N McMorrow (0-2), D Plunkett (0-1), E Dillon (0-1), D O’Callaghan (0-1), P Ryan (0-1f), M Schutte (0-1), C Cronin (0-1), D O’Connell (0-1).	Semple Stadium; Attendance: 5,105; Referee: C Lyons (Cork)

14 February 2016; 14:00; Round 1	Galway	1-27 - 1-21	Cork	Pearse Stadium; Attendance: 5,800; Referee: B Kelly (Westmeath)
14 February 2016; 14:00; Round 1	J Canning (0-9, 7 frees), N Burke (1-2), D Glennon (0-4), C Whelan (0-3), D Burke (0-3), P Brehony (0-2), C Mannion (0-2), G Lally (0-1 free), A Harte (0-1).	Report	P Horgan 0-9 (0-5f), S Harnedy 1-0, B Cooper 0-2, P O’Sullivan 0-2, C Murphy 0-1, A Nash 0-1 (0-1f), A Cadogan 0-1, L O’Farrell 0-1, C Lehane 0-1, L McLoughlin 0-1, C McCarthy 0-1, D Cahalane 0-1.	Pearse Stadium; Attendance: 5,800; Referee: B Kelly (Westmeath)

14 February 2016; 14:00; Round 1	Waterford	0-14 - 0-10	Kilkenny	Walsh Park; Attendance: 6,000 est. Referee: A Kelly
14 February 2016; 14:00; Round 1	S Bennett (0-3, two frees), M Shanahan (0-3, one free), P Curran (0-3, one free), J Dillon (0-2), C Dunford (0-2), A Gleeson (0-1).	Report	TJ Reid (0-7, six frees), P Walsh (0-1), R Hogan (0-1), C Fennelly (0-1).	Walsh Park; Attendance: 6,000 est. Referee: A Kelly

20 February 2016; 19:00; Round 2	Cork	1-14 - 0-20	Waterford	Páirc Uí Rinn; Attendance: 4,000 est. Referee: J Owens (Wexford)
20 February 2016; 19:00; Round 2	P Horgan (1-0 pen, 0-4 frees)(1-6); C Lehane (0-3); B Lawton (0-2); D Kearney, A Walsh (sideline), A Cadogan (0-1 each).	Report	M Shanahan (0-5 frees, 0-1 65)(0-6); A Gleeson (0-1 f), P Curran (0-3 each); J Barron, C Dunford (0-2 each); J Dillon, S Bennett, D Fives, K Moran (0-1 each).	Páirc Uí Rinn; Attendance: 4,000 est. Referee: J Owens (Wexford)

20 February 2016; 19:00; Round 2	Dublin	1-17 - 0-13	Galway	Parnell Park; Attendance: 4,754; Referee: F Horgan (Tipperary)
20 February 2016; 19:00; Round 2	D Treacy 0-10 (9f, 1'65), N McMorrow 0-4, S McGrath 1-0, D O'Callaghan, D McConnell, C Cronin 0-1.	Report	J Canning 0-5 (4f), C Mannion 0-3 (2f, 1'65), D Burke (1f), P Brehony, N Burke, A Harte, A Smith 0-1.	Parnell Park; Attendance: 4,754; Referee: F Horgan (Tipperary)

21 February 2016; 14:00; Round 2	Kilkenny	2-17 - 0-18	Tipperary	Nowlan Park; Attendance: 10,982; Referee: C McAllister (Cork)
21 February 2016; 14:00; Round 2	TJ Reid 0-10 (6f, 1 65), K Kelly 2-1, J Maher 0-4, P Walsh & W Walsh 0-1 each.	Report	J O’Dwyer 0-9 (3f, 2 65s), J McGrath 0-4 (1f), C Kenny & N McGrath 0-2 each, M Breen 0-1.	Nowlan Park; Attendance: 10,982; Referee: C McAllister (Cork)

5 March 2016; 17:00; Round 3	Dublin	4-21 - 2-17	Cork	Croke Park; Attendance: 20,280; Referee: A Kelly (Galway)
5 March 2016; 17:00; Round 3	D Treacy (1-7, 0-5 frees); E Dillon (2-2); S McGrath (1-0); M Schutte, N McMorrow S Barrett (0-2 each); D O'Callaghan, L Rushe, J McCaffrey, S Treacy, D Plunkett (0-1 each).	Report	P Horgan (0-7, 0-6 frees, 0-1 '65); S Harnedy (2-0); C Lehane (0-4); P Haughney (0-1 '65), L Farrell (0-2 each); B Lawton, B Cooper (0-1 each).	Croke Park; Attendance: 20,280; Referee: A Kelly (Galway)

6 March 2016; 14:00; Round 3	Kilkenny	0-21 - 1-14	Galway	Nowlan Park; Attendance: 7,402; Referee: B Kelly (Westmeath)
6 March 2016; 14:00; Round 3	TJ Reid (0-14, 7 frees, 3 65s); R Hogan, C Fogarty, J Maher (0-2 each); C Fennelly (0-1).	Report	J Canning (0-8, 3 frees); P Hoban (1-0); I Tannian, D Glennon (0-2 each); J Flynn, P Brehony (0-1 each).	Nowlan Park; Attendance: 7,402; Referee: B Kelly (Westmeath)

6 March 2016; 15:00; Round 3	Tipperary	1-17 - 1-18	Waterford	Semple Stadium; Attendance: 6,540; Referee: C Lyons (Cork)
6 March 2016; 15:00; Round 3	J O'Dwyer (0-11)(0-9 frees); J McGrath (1-2); M Breen (0-2); B Maher, N McGrath (0-1 each).	Report	P Curran (0-8)(0-6 frees); T Devine (1-0), S Bennett (0-3); K Moran, A Gleeson (0-2 each); J Barron, C Dunford (0-1 each).	Semple Stadium; Attendance: 6,540; Referee: C Lyons (Cork)

12 March 2016; 19:00; Round 4	Cork	2-22 - 2-23	Kilkenny	Páirc Uí Rinn; Attendance: 8,105; Referee: F Horgan (Tipperary)
12 March 2016; 19:00; Round 4	S Harnedy 1-3, P Horgan 0-6 (0-4f, 0-1 65), C Lehane 0-6 (0-1f), B Cooper 1-0, C Murphy 0-2, D Kearney, P Haughney, L O’Farrell, B Lawton, L McLoughlin 0-1 each.	Report	TJ Reid 1-12 (0-10f), C Fennelly 1-2, W Walsh, L Ryan 0-3 each, D Cody, R Hogan, J Power 0-1 each.	Páirc Uí Rinn; Attendance: 8,105; Referee: F Horgan (Tipperary)

13 March 2016; 14:00; Round 4	Galway	2-19 - 1-22	Tipperary	Pearse Stadium; Attendance: 6,619; Referee: J Owens (Wexford)
13 March 2016; 14:00; Round 4	J Canning 1-11 (0-8f, 0-1 s-l), N Burke 0-4, J Flynn 0-3, I Tannian 1-0, D Glennon 0-1.	Report	J McGrath 0-6 (0-5f), N O’Meara 1-0, M Breen 0-3, N McGrath 0-3, B Maher 0-2, A Ryan 0-2, J O’Dwyer 0-2, D Quinn 0-1, C Barrett 0-1, P Maher 0-1, B Heffernan 0-1.	Pearse Stadium; Attendance: 6,619; Referee: J Owens (Wexford)

13 March 2016; 14:00; Round 4	Waterford	0-14 - 0-19	Dublin	Walsh Park; Attendance: 6,362; Referee: P O'Dwyer (Carlow)
13 March 2016; 14:00; Round 4	P Curran (0-1 65, 0-5 frees)(0-7); A Gleeson (0-2 frees)(0-3); J Barron, S Bennett, J Dillon, C Dunford (0-1 each)	Report	D Treacy (0-9 frees); E Dillon (0-4); D O'Connell, J McCaffrey, N McMorrow, S McGrath, S Treacy, C Crummy (0-1 each).	Walsh Park; Attendance: 6,362; Referee: P O'Dwyer (Carlow)

20 March 2016; 14:00; Round 5	Kilkenny	0-23 - 1-14	Dublin	Nowlan Park; Attendance: 8,871; Referee: J Keenan (Wicklow)
20 March 2016; 14:00; Round 5	TJ Reid 0-11 (0-6f), R Hogan 0-3, W Walsh 0-3, P Walsh 0-2, L Ryan 0-2, J Power 0-1, K Joyce 0-1 (0-1f).	Report	D Treacy 0-5 (0-4f), F MacGib 1-1, E Dillon 0-3, N McMorrow 0-2, M Schutte 0-1, J McCaffrey 0-1, L Rushe 0-1.	Nowlan Park; Attendance: 8,871; Referee: J Keenan (Wicklow)

20 March 2016; 14:00; Round 5	Waterford	0-24 - 1-21	Galway	Walsh Park; Attendance: 5,029; Referee: B Gavin (Offaly)
20 March 2016; 14:00; Round 5	M Shanahan (0-9, 0-8f), S Bennett (0-6), B O’Halloran (0-3), M Kearney (0-2), T Ryan (0-1), T Devine (0-1), G O’Brien (0-1), C Roche (0-1).	Report	N Burke (1-3), J Canning (0-6,0-4f), C Mannion (0-2), C Whelan (0-2), E Burke (0-2), D Glennon (0-2), D Burke (0-2), A Harte (0-1), J Flynn (0-1).	Walsh Park; Attendance: 5,029; Referee: B Gavin (Offaly)

20 March 2016; 14:10; Round 5	Tipperary	2-27 - 2-15	Cork	Semple Stadium; Attendance: 7,251; Referee: P O'Dwyer (Carlow)
20 March 2016; 14:10; Round 5	J O’Dwyer 0-10 (9f), M Breen 1-4, J McGrath 0-5, N O’Meara 1-1, N McGrath, S Callanan & D McCormack 0-2 each, B Maher 0-1.	Report	P Horgan 1-8 (0-6f), P O’Sullivan 1-0, C Lehane 0-3, P Haughney, B Lawton, B Cooper & L O’Farrell 0-1 each.	Semple Stadium; Attendance: 7,251; Referee: P O'Dwyer (Carlow)

== Division 1B ==
=== Division 1B Table ===
NHL champions

Team	Pld	W	D	L	F	A	Diff	Pts
Clare	5	5	0	0	6-107	2-69	50	10
Limerick	5	4	0	1	10-108	3-75	54	8
Wexford	5	2	0	3	6-84	4-92	-2	4
Offaly	5	2	0	3	5-85	8-84	-8	4
Kerry	5	2	0	3	5-74	9-103	-41	4
Laois	5	0	0	5	3-78	9-113	-53	0

=== Division 1B Rounds 1 to 5 ===
13 February 2016; 19:00; Round 1	Limerick	2-23 - 0-15	Wexford	Gaelic Grounds; Attendance: 2,359; Referee: D Kirwan (Cork)
13 February 2016; 19:00; Round 1	D Hannon (1-4, 0-3f), G Mulcahy (1-1), P Browne (0-4), D Byrnes (0-4, 3f), T Morrissey (0-2), B Nash (0-2), G O’Mahony (0-2), J Fitzgibbon (0-1), D Reidy (0-1), S Tobin (0-1), C Lynch (0-1).	Report	H Kehoe (0-6f), I Byrne (0-2f), L Chin (0-2), A Shore (0-2), M O’Hanlon (0-1), L Og McGovern (0-1), S Murphy (0-1).	Gaelic Grounds; Attendance: 2,359; Referee: D Kirwan (Cork)

14 February 2016; 14:00; Round 1	Clare	2-21 - 0-15	Offaly	Cusack Park; Referee: S Cleere (Kilkenny)
14 February 2016; 14:00; Round 1	C Ryan 0-9 (7f); J Conlon 0-3; P Duggan 1-0, A Shanagher 1-0; D McInerney, B Duggan (1f) 0-2; C Galvin, C Dillon, D Reidy, C Cleary, S O’Donnell 0-1 each.	Report	S Dooley 0-8 (6f, 1′ 65); P Camon 0-3; P Murphy 0-2; C Doughan, S Kinsella 0-1 each.	Cusack Park; Referee: S Cleere (Kilkenny)

14 February 2016; 14:00; Round 1	Laois	2-14 - 1-24	Kerry	O'Moore Park; Referee: C McAllister (Cork)
14 February 2016; 14:00; Round 1	PJ Scully 0-6 (0-4f, 1 ’65), C Dwyer 0-4, C Healy, P Purcell 1-0 each, C Collier 0-2, M Whelan, S Maher 0-1 each.	Report	S Nolan 0-8 (0-5f, 0-2 ’65s), M Boyle 1-1, J Egan 0-4, J Goulding 0-3, M O’Leary, P Kelly, C Harty 0-2 each, J Griffin, J Conway 0-1 each.	O'Moore Park; Referee: C McAllister (Cork)

21 February 2016; 14:00; Round 2	Kerry	1-15 - 1-19	Limerick	Fitzgerald Stadium; Referee: J Ryan (Tipperary)
21 February 2016; 14:00; Round 2	S Nolan 0-5 (0-4f), J Egan 0-4, M Boyle 1-0, P Lucid (0-1f), M O’Leary 0-2, C Harty, J Goulding 0-1 each.	Report	D Hannon 1-4, B Nash 0-4, D Byrne (0-2f, 0-1 ’65), D Reidy 0-3 each, P Browne 0-2, C Lynch, G Mulcahy 0-1 each.	Fitzgerald Stadium; Referee: J Ryan (Tipperary)

21 February 2016; 14:00; Round 2	Offaly	1-17 - 0-15	Laois	O'Connor Park
21 February 2016; 14:00; Round 2	S Dooley 0-12 (0-6f, 0-1 ’65), L Langton 1-0, P Murphy 0-2, J O’Connor, S Kinsella and C Egan 0-1 each.	Report	PJ Scully 0-5 (0-3f), S Maher 0-3, R King, E Rowland and Z Keenan 0-2 each, W Hyland 0-1.	O'Connor Park

21 February 2016; 14:00; Round 2	Wexford	1-11 - 0-18	Clare	Innovate Wexford Park; Referee: J McGrath (Westmeath)
21 February 2016; 14:00; Round 2	H Kehoe 0-6 (0-6f); M Fanning 1-0 (pen); D Dunne 0-2; P Doran, E Moore and A Shore 0-1 each.	Report	C Ryan 0-10 (0-8f, 0-1 ’65); C McGrath, J Browne and B Duggan 0-2 each; J Conlon and D Reidy 0-1 each.	Innovate Wexford Park; Referee: J McGrath (Westmeath)

5 March 2016; 19:00; Round 3	Laois	0-16 - 1-21	Clare	O'Moore Park; Referee: D Kirwan (Cork)
5 March 2016; 19:00; Round 3	Z Keenan (0-5 (4f); W Hyland, PJ Scully (2f) (0-3 each); C Dwyer (0-2); L Bergin, S Maher, E Rowland (’65) (0-1 each).	Report	B Duggan (0-6f); J Conlon (1-2); Colin Ryan (0-5, 1f, 1’65); D Reidy (0-3); A Cunningham (0-2); G O’Connell, Conor Ryan, C O’Connell (0-1 each).	O'Moore Park; Referee: D Kirwan (Cork)

6 March 2016; 12:45; Round 3	Kerry	0-8 - 2-25	Wexford	Austin Stack Park; Referee: J O'Brien (Tipperary)
6 March 2016; 12:45; Round 3	S Nolan (0-5, 4 frees); M Boyle, J Egan, C Harty (0-1 each).	Report	A Shore (1-7); H Kehoe (0-6 frees); C McDonald (1-2); S Tomkins, I Byrne (pen), A Nolan (0-2 each); L Óg McGovern, L Chin, E Moore, D O’Keeffe (0-1 each).	Austin Stack Park; Referee: J O'Brien (Tipperary)

6 March 2016; 14:00; Round 3	Offaly	0-14 - 1-19	Limerick	O'Connor Park; Referee: J Keenan (Wicklow)
6 March 2016; 14:00; Round 3	S Dooley 0-8 (5fs, 1 s-l), J Bergin 0-2, C McDonald, C Egan, S Gardiner, J Sampson 0-1 each.	Report	D Hannon 1-6 (0-2fs), D Byrne (3fs), T Morrissey, P Browne 0-3 each, G O'Mahony 0-2, S Hickey, D O'Donovan 0-1 each.	O'Connor Park; Referee: J Keenan (Wicklow)

12 March 2016; 17:00; Round 4	Limerick	6-29 - 1-12	Laois	Gaelic Grounds; Referee: J McGrath (Westmeath)
12 March 2016; 17:00; Round 4	J Fitzgibbon 1-14 (0-9f, 0-1 sideline), B Nash 2-2, G Mulcahy 1-1, P Browne 0-4, T Morrissey 0-4, P Ryan 1-0, M Ryan 1-0, K O’Brien 0-2, G O’Mahony 0-1, D Byrnes 0-1 (0-1f).	Report	PJ Scully 1-5 (0-4f), C Dwyer 0-3, R Mullaney 0-1, C Collier 0-1, R King 0-1, S Maher 0-1.	Gaelic Grounds; Referee: J McGrath (Westmeath)

13 March 2016; 13:00; Round 4	Wexford	3-11 - 2-22	Offaly	Innovate Wexford Park; Referee: J Ryan (Tipperary)
13 March 2016; 13:00; Round 4	C McDonald (2-0 pens, 0-7 frees) 2-8, A Nolan 1-0, A Shore, D O’Keeffe, J O’Connor 0-1 each.	Report	S Dooley (0-11 frees, 0-1, 65) 0-15, P Murphy, J Bergin (1-2 each), S Ryan, J Mulrooney 0-1 each.	Innovate Wexford Park; Referee: J Ryan (Tipperary)

13 March 2016; 14:00; Round 4	Clare	2-28 - 1-9	Kerry	Cusack Park; Referee: B Gavin {Offaly}
13 March 2016; 14:00; Round 4	B Duggan 1-7 (1-0 Pen, 5f, 1 '65'); A Cunningham 1-6; C McGrath 0-5; C Galvin 0-5; D Reidy 0-2; C O’Connell, C Cleary, B Bugler 0-1 each	Report	J Egan 0-4 (3f); D Collins 1-0f; M O’Leary 0-2; J Diggins, J Buckley, B Brosnan 0-1 each	Cusack Park; Referee: B Gavin {Offaly}

20 March 2016; 14:00; Round 5	Clare	1-19 - 0-18	Limerick	Cusack Park; Attendance: 8,847; Referee: F Horgan (Tipperary)
20 March 2016; 14:00; Round 5	B Duggan 0-6 (0-6f), C McGrath 0-5, J Conlon 1-1, C Galvin, C O’Connell (0-2f) 0-2 each, D McInerney, D Reidy, C Dillon 0-1 each.	Report	D Hannon 0-9 (0-8f), P Browne 0-4, D Byrnes (0-1f), G Mulcahy, J Ryan, D O’Donovan, D Reidy 0-1 each.	Cusack Park; Attendance: 8,847; Referee: F Horgan (Tipperary)

20 March 2016; 14:00; Round 5	Laois	0-21 - 0-22	Wexford	O'Moore Park; Referee: S Cleere (Kilkenny)
20 March 2016; 14:00; Round 5	PJ Scully (0-9, 0-7f), C Dwyer (0-3), W Hyland (0-2), P Purcell (0-2), W Dunphy (0-2), S Maher (0-1), C Stapleton (0-1), J Lennon (0-1).	Report	C McDonald (0-8, 0-6f), I Byrne (0-5, 0-1f), S Tomkins (0-4); P Morris (0-2), C Dunbar (0-1), L Óg McGovern (0-1), L Chin (0-1).	O'Moore Park; Referee: S Cleere (Kilkenny)

20 March 2016; 14:00; Round 5	Offaly	2-17 - 2-18	Kerry	St. Brendan's Park, Birr; Referee: J Keane (Galway)
20 March 2016; 14:00; Round 5	S Dooley (0-13, 0-8f, 0-1 sideline, 0-1 '65'), J Mulrooney (1-1), J Bergin (1-1), C Egan (0-1), S Ryan (0-1).	Report	J Egan (1-10, 0-9f), C Harty (1-0), J Conway (0-3), M Boyle (0-2), J Griffin (0-1), S Nolan (0-1).	St. Brendan's Park, Birr; Referee: J Keane (Galway)

== Division 1 Knockout ==
=== Division 1 Quarter-finals ===
2 April 2016; 19:00; Quarter-final	Dublin	1-19 - 1-21	Limerick	Parnell Park; Attendance: 4,000 est. Referee: B Gavin (Offaly)
2 April 2016; 19:00; Quarter-final	D Treacy 1-8 (0-7f), N McMorrow 0-4, E Dillon 0-3, D O'Connell 0-2, F MacGib 0-1, D O'Callaghan 0-1	Report	S Dowling 0-6 (0-4f, 0-1 65), K Downes 1-2, D Byrnes 0-3, T Morrissey 0-2, B Nash 0-2, G O'Mahony 0-2, P Browne 0-1, R Lynch 0-1 (0-1f), J Fitzgibbon 0-1, P O'Brien 0-1	Parnell Park; Attendance: 4,000 est. Referee: B Gavin (Offaly)

3 April 2016; 15:30; Quarter-final	Wexford	1-13 - 0-17	Waterford	Innovate Wexford Park; Attendance: 4,000 est. Referee: J Ryan (Tipperary)
3 April 2016; 15:30; Quarter-final	I Byrne 0-4 (3fs, 1 65’); C McDonald 1-0; H Kehoe 0-3, L Chin, A Nolan 0-2 each; S Tomkins, P Morris 0-1 each.	Report	M Shanahan 0-12 (9fs, 1 65’); A Gleeson 0-2; P Mahony, P Curran, M Walsh 0-1 each.	Innovate Wexford Park; Attendance: 4,000 est. Referee: J Ryan (Tipperary)

3 April 2016; 15:45; Quarter-final	Kilkenny	6-20 - 0-14	Offaly	Nowlan Park; Attendance: 5,000
3 April 2016; 15:45; Quarter-final	K Kelly (1-7, 0-7f), C Fennelly (2-1), L Blanchfield (1-3), J Power (1-2), L Ryan (1-2), M Fennelly (0-2), W Walsh (0-1), C O'Shea (0-1), C Buckley (0-1).	Report	S Dooley (0-6, 0-6f), K Connolly (0-3), J Mulrooney (0-2), P Murphy (0-1), J Bergin (0-1), C Egan (0-1).	Nowlan Park; Attendance: 5,000

3 April 2016; 15:45; Quarter-final	Clare	2-13 - 0-18	Tipperary	Cusack Park; Attendance: 9,038; Referee: D Kirwan (Cork)
3 April 2016; 15:45; Quarter-final	J Conlon 1-1, A Shanagher 1-0, B Duggan (2f), D Honan 0-3 each, C Galvin, C McGrath, C O’Connell (2f) 0-2 each.	Report	J McGrath 0-6, J O’Dwyer 0-3 (3f), S Callanan (2f), M Breen P Maher 0-2 each, J Forde, R Maher, N McGrath 0-1 each.	Cusack Park; Attendance: 9,038; Referee: D Kirwan (Cork)

=== Division 1 Semi-finals ===
17 April 2016; 2:00 pm Semi-final	Limerick	1-18 - 3-23	Waterford	Semple Stadium; Attendance: 20,481; Referee: B Kelly (Westmeath)
17 April 2016; 2:00 pm Semi-final	R Lynch 0-7f, S Dowling 1-1f, T Morrissey 0-3, D Byrnes & B Nash 0-2 each, P Browne, J Ryan & T Condon 0-1 each.	Report	P Curran 1-10 (0-7f, 0-2 65s), S Bennett 1-3 (1-0 pen), T Devine 1-1, A Gleeson 0-3 (1f), C Dunford 0-2, T de Búrca, D Fives, K Moran & B O’Halloran 0-1 each.	Semple Stadium; Attendance: 20,481; Referee: B Kelly (Westmeath)

17 April 2016; 4:00 pm Semi-final	Clare	4-22 - 2-19	Kilkenny	Semple Stadium; Attendance: 20,481; Referee: F Horgan (Tipperary)
17 April 2016; 4:00 pm Semi-final	A Cunningham 2-3, C McGrath 1-6 (0-2f, 0-2 65s), C Galvin 0-5, J Conlon 1-1, D Honan & T Kelly 0-2 each, D Reidy, P Collins & C O’Connell 0-1 each.	Report	TJ Reid 1-7 (1-6f), JJ Farrell 1-1, P Walsh, W Walsh, K Kelly & C Bolger 0-2 each, C Buckley, J Power & R Hogan 0-1 each.	Semple Stadium; Attendance: 20,481; Referee: F Horgan (Tipperary)

=== Division 1 Final & Replay ===
1 May 2016; 3:30 pm Final	Waterford	0-22 - 0-22 (a.e.t)	Clare	Semple Stadium; Attendance: 19,498; Referee: B Gavin (Offaly)
1 May 2016; 3:30 pm Final	S Bennett (0-9, 6f), P Curran (0-4, 2f), A Gleeson (0-2, 2f), T Ryan (0-2), B O'Halloran (0-1), M Shanahan (0-1f), P Mahony (0-1), J Barron (0-1), C Dunford (0-1).	Report	C McGrath (0-13, 10f), T Kelly (0-3), C Galvin (0-2), P Duggan (0-1), D Reidy (0-1), P Collins (0-1), C Ryan (0-1).	Semple Stadium; Attendance: 19,498; Referee: B Gavin (Offaly)

8 May 2016; 3:30pm Final replay	Waterford	2-19 - 1-23	Clare	Semple Stadium; Attendance: 14,210
8 May 2016; 3:30pm Final replay	P Curran 1-9 (0-6f, 0-1 ’65), A Gleeson 0-3, J Dillon 1-0, J Barron, S Bennett 0-2 each, K Moran, D Fives, B O’Halloran 0-1 each.	Report	T Kelly 1-6 (0-1f), C McGrath 0-8 (0-5f), D Honan, C Ryan (0-1f) 0-2 each, P O’Connor, D Fitzgerald, D Reidy, A Cunningham, P Collins 0-1 each.	Semple Stadium; Attendance: 14,210

=== Division 1A relegation play-off ===
3 April 2016; Play-off	Galway	0-25 - 2-22	Cork	Pearse Stadium; Attendance: 6,110
3 April 2016; Play-off	J Canning 0-13 (11f, 1’65, 1’sl), N Burke 0-3, C Mannion 0-3, D Burke 0-1, A Harte 0-1, P Brehony 0-1, C Whelan 0-1, I Tannian 0-1, A Smith 0-1.	Report	P Horgan 1-7 (3f), C Lehane 0-6, A Cadagon 0-3, S Harnedy 1-0, D Kearney 0-2, B Lawton 0-2, W Egan 0-1, B Cooper 0-1.	Pearse Stadium; Attendance: 6,110

=== Division 1B play-off ===
2 April 2016; Play-off	Kerry	2-27 - 1-19	Laois	Austin Stack Park; Referee: S Cleere (Kilkenny)
2 April 2016; Play-off	S Nolan 1-9 (0-6 frees), J Egan (1-6), M O’Leary 0-3, J Griffin, B O’Leary, M Boyle and J Goulding 0-2 each, C Harty 0-1.	Report	PJ Scully 0-7 (0-3, 0-1 ’65), S Maher 1-1, C Dwyer 0-4, C Healy and W Hyland 0-2 each, E Rowland (0-1 free), P Purcell and W Dunphy 0-1 each	Austin Stack Park; Referee: S Cleere (Kilkenny)

=== Division 1B Relegation/Promotion play-off ===
9 April 2016; 3:30 pm Relegation/Promotion play-off	Laois	0-23 - 0-16	Westmeath	O'Connor Park; Referee: J Keenan (Wicklow)
9 April 2016; 3:30 pm Relegation/Promotion play-off	PJ Scully (0-10, 0-6f, 0-1 '65'), C Dwyer (0-6), W Dunphy (0-2), N Foyle (0-1), E Rowland (0-1f), J Lennon (0-1), Z Keenan (0-1), M Kavanagh (0-1).	Report	N O’Brien (0-7), B Murtagh (0-3f), E Price (0-3), L Varley (0-1), N Dowdall (0-1), C Boyle (0-1).	O'Connor Park; Referee: J Keenan (Wicklow)

=== Statistics ===
Top scorer overall

Rank	Player	Team	Tally	Total	Matches	Average
1	T. J. Reid	Kilkenny	2-61	67	6	11.16
2	Shane Dooley	Offaly	0-62	62	6	10.33
3	Joe Canning	Galway	1-52	55	6	0.16
4	P. J. Scully	Laois	2-47	53	7	7.57
5	Patrick Horgan	Cork	3-43	52	6	8.66
6	Patrick Curran	Waterford	2-45	51	8	6.37
7	David Treacy	Dublin	2-42	48	6	8.0
8	Conor McGrath	Clare	1-41	44	8	5.50
9	John O'Dwyer	Tipperary	0-38	38	6	6.33
10	Conor McGrath	Clare	1-33	36	7	5.14

Top scorer in a single game

Rank	Player	Team	Tally	Total	Opposition
1	John Fitzgibbon	Limerick	1-14	17	Laois
2	T. J. Reid	Kilkenny	1-12	15	Cork
2	Shane Dooley	Offaly	0-15	15	Wexford
4	Conor McDonald	Wexford	2-8	14	Offaly
4	Joe Canning	Galway	1-11	14	Tipperary
4	T. J. Reid	Kilkenny	0-14	14	Galway
7	John Egan	Kerry	1-10	13	Offaly
7	Shane Dooley	Offaly	0-13	13	Kerry
7	Conor McGrath	Clare	0-13	13	Waterford
7	Joe Canning	Galway	0-13	13	Cork

Clean sheets

Rank	Goalkeeper	Team	Clean sheets
1	Patrick Kelly	Clare	4
2	Eoin Murphy	Kilkenny	3
2	Stephen O'Keeffe	Waterford	3
2	James Skehill	Galway	3
2	Conor O'Leary	Wexford	3
6	Nickie Quaid	Limerick	2
6	Conor Dooley	Dublin	2
6	Anthony Nash	Cork	2
6	Enda Rowland	Laois	2
10	Darren Gleeson	Tipperary	1
10	Mark Fanning	Wexford	1
10	James Dempsey	Offaly	1
10	Andrew Fahey	Clare	1
10	Gary Maguire	Dublin	1
10	Paddy Maloney	Westmeath	1

== Division 2A ==
National League Division 2A
- Season: 2016
- Champions: Westmeath
- Relegated: Derry
- Matches: 16
- Top goalscorer: Kevin O'Loughlin (3-37)
- Best goalkeeper: Patrick Maloney (4 clean sheets)
- Biggest home win: Carlow 2-25 - 0-9 Derry (6 March 2016)
- Biggest away win: Carlow 1-11 - 5-16 London (21 February 2016)
- Highest scoring: Antrim 3-25 - 3-13 Kildare (21 February 2016)
- All statistics correct as of 29 March 2016.

On 26 March 2016, Westneath won the title after a 0-10 to 0-8 win over Carlow. It was their first league title since 2008 when they claimed the Division 2 title in the old system.

London's Kevin O'Loughlin was the Division 2A top scorer with 3-37.

=== Table ===
Division 2A Champion Relegated to Division 2B

Team	Pld	W	D	L	F	A	Diff	Pts
Carlow	5	4	0	1	6-86	7-65	18	8
Westmeath	5	4	0	1	7-74	0-66	29	8
London	5	3	1	1	7-77	4-73	13	7
Antrim	5	2	0	3	6-86	9-74	3	4
Kildare	5	1	1	3	5-69	7-86	-23	3
Derry	5	0	0	5	3-63	7-91	-40	0

=== Rounds 1 to 5 ===
14 February 2016; 14:00; Round 1	Derry	2-12 - 1-21	Antrim	Celtic Park; Referee: J Keane (Galway)
14 February 2016; 14:00; Round 1	R Convery (1-8, all frees), G O'Kane (1-0), S Farren (0-2), B Quigley (0-1), B Laverty (0-1).	Report	C Clarke (0-8, 6 frees), K McKernan (0-4), D Nugent (1-0), E McCloskey (0-3), Conor Johnston (0-2), J Black (0-1), N McKenna (0-1), J McGreevy (0-1), S McCaughan (0-1).	Celtic Park; Referee: J Keane (Galway)

14 February 2016; 14:00; Round 1	Kildare	0-14 - 2-13	Carlow	St. Conleth's Park; Referee: G McGrath (Dublin)
14 February 2016; 14:00; Round 1	M Fitzgerald 0-7(5f)G Keegan and J Byrne 0-2 each, J Sheridan, P Divilly, P Ryan 0-1 each.	Report	D Murphy 0-9(6f, 1'65), R Smithers and S Murphy 1-0 each, K Mc Donald, D Byrne, D English, C Wall 0-1 each.	St. Conleth's Park; Referee: G McGrath (Dublin)

14 February 2016; 14:00; Round 1	London	0-13 - 2-16	Westmeath	Irish TV Grounds, Ruislip; Referee: P Murphy (Carlow)
14 February 2016; 14:00; Round 1	K O'Loughlin (0-10, 8f, 1'65), S O'Donnell (0-1), K Reid (0-1), N McDonnell (0-1).	Report	C Boyle (1-2), B Murtagh (0-5, 4f), R Greville (1-1), N Dowdall (0-3), D Egerton (0-2), N O'Brien (0-1f), L Varley (0-1), P Lynam (0-1).	Irish TV Grounds, Ruislip; Referee: P Murphy (Carlow)

21 February 2016; 13:00; Round 2	Carlow	1-11 - 5-16	London	Netwatch Cullen Park; Referee: J O'Brien (Tipperary)
21 February 2016; 13:00; Round 2	C Wall 0-4, S M Nolan 0-3, S Whelan 1-0, D English 0-2 (1 '65, 1 pen), S Murphy, C Lawlor 0-1 each.	Report	K O'Loughlin 3-9 (0-3fs, 3 '65s', 1-0 pen, 0-2s-l), M Duggan 1-1, B Walsh 1-0, Mark O'Dwyer, D Roberts 0-2 each, N McDonnell, K Reid 0-1 each.	Netwatch Cullen Park; Referee: J O'Brien (Tipperary)

21 February 2016; 14:00; Round 2	Antrim	3-25 - 3-13	Kildare	Páirc Mac Uílín; Referee: D Hughes (Carlow)
21 February 2016; 14:00; Round 2	C Clarke 1-9 (0-5fs, 0-1 '65'), S McCaughan 2-1, K McKernan 0-5 (1f), N McKenna, Conor Johnston 0-3 each, J McGreevy 0-2, E McCloskey, S McCrory 0-1 each.	Report	M Fitzgerald 0-7 (6fs), G Keegan 1-3, J Sheridan 2-0, N O Muineachain, R Casey, P Cocoman 0-1 each.	Páirc Mac Uílín; Referee: D Hughes (Carlow)

21 February 2016; 14:00; Round 2	Westmeath	2-11 - 0-13	Derry	Cusack Park; Referee: J Keenan (Wicklow)
21 February 2016; 14:00; Round 2	A Devine, D McNicholas (1f) 1-1 each, L Varley, C Doyle, B Murtagh (2f) 0-2 each, A Clarke, C Boyle, E Price 0-1 each.	Report	R Convery 0-6 (6f), J O'Dwyer, M McGuigan 0-2 each, P Kelly, G O'Kane, P Cleary 0-1 each.	Cusack Park; Referee: J Keenan (Wicklow)

5 March 2016; 14:00; Round 3	London	1-11 - 0-14	Kildare	Irish TV Grounds, Ruislip; Referee: É Hassan (Derry)
5 March 2016; 14:00; Round 3	K Reid (1f) 0-5; M Duggan 1-1; K O'Loughlin (3f) 0-3, D Roberts, D Browne 0-1 each.	Report	G Keegan (3f) 0-6; M Fitzgerald 0-2; M Delaney, M Moloney, N O'Muineachain, P Cocoman, D Flaherty, J Sheridan 0-1 each.	Irish TV Grounds, Ruislip; Referee: É Hassan (Derry)

6 March 2016; 14:00; Round 3	Carlow	2-25 - 0-9	Derry	Netwatch Cullen Park; Referee: P Burke (Kilkenny)
6 March 2016; 14:00; Round 3	D Murphy 1-12 (0-9fs), M Kavanagh 0-5, J Kavanagh 1-1, James Doyle 0-2, J O'Hara, Seamus Murphy, S Whelan, R Kelly, Seán Murphy 0-1 each.	Report	O McCloskey, J O'Dwyer 0-3 each, R Convery 0-2 (2fs), G O'Kane 0-1 (1f).	Netwatch Cullen Park; Referee: P Burke (Kilkenny)

6 March 2016; 14:00; Round 3	Westmeath	2-11 - 0-10	Antrim	Cusack Park; Referee: G McGrath (Wexford)
6 March 2016; 14:00; Round 3	D McNicholas (1-5, 0-4 frees), R Greville (1-0), L Varley (0-2, both frees), B Murtagh (0-1), N O Brien (0-1 free), C Boyle (0-1), G Greville (0-1).	Report	C Clarke (0-4, 3 frees), Conor Johnston (0-2), K McKernan (0-2, 1 free), J Connolly (0-1), L Watson (0-1).	Cusack Park; Referee: G McGrath (Wexford)

12 March 2016; 14:00; Round 4	Kildare	0-10 - 0-21	Westmeath	St. Conleth's Park
12 March 2016; 14:00; Round 4	G Keegan 0-3, M Fitzgerald 0-2, S Gainey 0-1, N Ó Muineacháin 0-1, J Sheridan 0-1, M Delaney 0-1, J Byrne 0-1.		D McNicholas 0-7, C Boyle 0-3, A McGrath 0-2, A Devine 0-2, L Varley 0-2, G Greville 0-1, B Murtagh 0-1, K Doyle 0-1, R Greville 0-1, D Egerton 0-1.	St. Conleth's Park

13 March 2016; 13:00; Round 4	Derry	0-13 - 0-16	London	Celtic Park; Referee: J Keane (Galway)
13 March 2016; 13:00; Round 4	R Convery 0-6 (5f), A Grant 0-4(4f), T McCloskey 0-2 and J O'Dwyer 0-1.	Report	K O'Loughlin 0-7, (6fs), M Duggan 0-3, K Reid 0-2, T Lawrence, M Murphy, M O'Dwyer 0-1 each and E Kelly 0-1 (1f).	Celtic Park; Referee: J Keane (Galway)

13 March 2016; 14:00; Round 4	Antrim	1-11 - 1-17	Carlow	Páirc Mac Uílín; Referee: S Cleere (Kilkenny)
13 March 2016; 14:00; Round 4	C Johnston 0-3, 1f, J Connolly 1-0, C Clarke (2f), L Watson (1f, 1 '65') 0-2 each, K McKernan, E McCloskey, M Dudley, N McKenna 0-1 each.	Report	D Murphy 0-7f, M Kavanagh 1-1, J Doyle, Sean Murphy, S Whelan, 0-2 each, D English, J Kavanagh, JM Nolan 0-1 each.	Páirc Mac Uílín; Referee: S Cleere (Kilkenny)

20 March 2016; 14:00; Round 5	Carlow	0-20 - 1-15	Westmeath	Netwatch Cullen Park; Referee: J Ryan (Tipperary)
20 March 2016; 14:00; Round 5	J Doyle 0-7 (5fs), M Kavanagh (1f), K McDonald, J Kavanagh 0-3 each, D Byrne, J O'Hara, Seán Murphy, Seamus Murphy 0-1 each.	Report	B Murtagh 1-4 (0-1f), L Varley 0-5 (4fs), C Boyle, E Price 0-2 each, R Greville, D Egerton 0-1 each.	Netwatch Cullen Park; Referee: J Ryan (Tipperary)

20 March 2016; 14:00; Round 5	Kildare	2-18 - 1-16	Derry	St. Conleth's Park; Referee: J Herffernan (Wexford)
20 March 2016; 14:00; Round 5	M Fitzgerald 1-9 (5fs, 3'65), J Byrne 1-3, P Ryan 0-3, P Cocoman 0-2, N O'Muineachain 0-1.	Report	R Convery 0-10 (7fs, 1'65, 1s), O McCluskey 1-2, A Grant 0-2, M McGuigan, J O'Dwyer 0-1.	St. Conleth's Park; Referee: J Herffernan (Wexford)

20 March 2016; 14:00; Round 5	London	1-21 - 1-19	Antrim	Irish TV Grounds, Ruislip; Referee: E Hassan (Derry)
20 March 2016; 14:00; Round 5	K O'Loughlin 0-8 (3fs, 2 '65s');S O'Donnell 1-2; K Reid 0-4; M Duggan 0-2; E Kelly (f); T Lawrence, B Regan, O Gately, M O'Dwyer 0-1.	Report	C Johnston 0-6 (3f); E McCloskey 0-4; N McKenna 1-0; J Connolly, S Beatty 0-2; C Clarke 0-2 (1f); D Nugent, D Hamill, K McKernan 0-1.	Irish TV Grounds, Ruislip; Referee: E Hassan (Derry)

=== Division 2A Final ===
26 March 2016; Final	Carlow	0-8 - 0-10	Westmeath	O'Connor Park; Referee: J Keane (Galway)
26 March 2016; Final	K McDonald (0-4f); M Kavanagh (0-3, 2 frees); J Doyle (0-1)	Report	B Murtagh (0-7, 5 frees, 2 ‘65s); A Devine, E Price & C Boyle (0-1 each).	O'Connor Park; Referee: J Keane (Galway)

=== Statistics ===
Top scorer overall

Rank	Player	Team	Tally	Total	Matches	Average
1	Kevin O'Loughlin	London	3-37	46	5	9.2
2	Ruairí Convery	Derry	1-32	35	5	7.0
3	Denis Murphy	Carlow	1-28	31	3	10.3
4	Martin Fitzgerald	Kildare	1-27	30	5	6.0
5	Ciarán Clarke	Antrim	1-25	28	5	5.6
6	Brendan Murtagh	Westmeath	1-20	23	6	3.8
7	Derek McNicholas	Westmeath	2-13	19	5	3.8
8	Gerry Keegan	Kildare	1-14	17	5	5.4
9	Marty Kavanagh	Carlow	1-12	15	4	3.75
10	Kevin McKernan	Antrim	0-13	13	5	2.6

Single game

Rank	Player	Club	Tally	Total	Opposition
1	Kevin O'Loughlin	London	3-9	18	Carlow
2	Denis Murphy	Carlow	1-12	15	Derry
3	Ciarán Clarke	Antrim	1-9	12	Kildare
3	Martin Fitzgerald	Kildare	1-9	12	Derry
5	Ruairí Convery	Derry	1-8	11	Antrim
6	Kevin O'Loughlin	London	0-10	10	Westmeath
6	Ruairí Convery	Derry	0-10	10	Kildare
8	Denis Murphy	Carlow	0-9	9	Kildare
9	Derek McNicholas	Westmeath	1-5	8	Antrim
9	Ciarán Clarke	Antrim	0-8	8	Derry
9	Kevin O'Loughlin	London	0-8	8	Antrim

== Division 2B ==
National League Division 2B
- Season: 2016
- Champions: Armagh
- Matches: 17
- Top goalscorer: Ryan Gaffney (0-53)
- Biggest home win: Meath 2-35 - 0-9 Donegal (6 March 2016)
- Biggest away win: Donegal 0-14 - 3-22 Down (13 March 2016)
- Highest scoring: Wicklow 2-27 - 0-17 Donegal (20 March 2016)
- All statistics correct as of 30 March 2016.

On 26 March 2016, Armagh won the title after a 0-20 to 1-15 win over Down. It was their first league title since 2006 when they claimed the Division 3 title in the old system. The victory also secured promotion to Division 2A for 2017.

Armagh's Ryan Gaffney was the Division 2B top scorer with 0-53.

=== Table ===
Champions and promoted team Possible relegation

Team	Pld	W	D	L	F	A	Diff	Pts
Down	5	4	0	1	11-83	3-73	34	8
Armagh	5	4	0	1	7-88	7-59	29	8
Mayo	5	3	0	2	2-76	5-69	-2	6
Meath	5	2	0	3	6-90	2-84	18	4
Wicklow	5	2	0	3	6-80	6-81	-1	4
Donegal	5	0	0	5	1-61	10-112	-78	0

=== Rounds 1 to 5 ===
14 February 2016; 14:00; Round 1	Armagh	2-14 - 2-16	Down	Athletic Grounds; Referee: É Hassan (Derry)
14 February 2016; 14:00; Round 1	C Corvan (1-4), R Gaffney (0-5, 0-3 frees), J Corvan (1-0), D Coulter (0-2 65s), N Curry (0-1), E McGuinness (0-1), D McKenna (0-1).	Report	D Toner (1-6, 0-1 free), C Woods (1-3, 1-0 sideline), C Bailie (0-2), C O’Prey (0-1), D Hughes (0-1), S Nicholson (0-1), F Conway (0-1), C Mageean (0-1).	Athletic Grounds; Referee: É Hassan (Derry)

14 February 2016; 14:00; Round 1	Mayo	1-14 - 0-13	Donegal	Elverys, MacHale Park; Referee: J Murphy (Limerick)
14 February 2016; 14:00; Round 1	K Feeney (1-5, 4f), K Higgins (0-4, 1f), C Freeman (0-2), S Regan (0-1), J McManus (0-1), E Collins (0-1)	Report	C Matthewson (0-5, 3f 1 65’), K Campbell (0-4, 4f), L Henderson (0-1), J O’Loughlin (0-1), J Boyle (0-1), B Lafferty (0-1).	Elverys, MacHale Park; Referee: J Murphy (Limerick)

14 February 2016; 14:00; Round 1	Wicklow	0-13 - 0-22	Meath	Pearse Park, Arklow; Referee: P Quilty (Kilkenny)
14 February 2016; 14:00; Round 1	D Masterson 0-6f, G Weir, R Keddy 0-2 each, A Byrne, E Dunne, E Kearns 0-1 each.	Report	J Keena 0-8 (6f), J Regan 0-5 (1 '65, 4f), T Hammersley 0-3, K Keoghan 0-2, D Healy, N Heffernan, A Gannon, C Fitzsimons 0-1 each.	Pearse Park, Arklow; Referee: P Quilty (Kilkenny)

21 February 2016; 14:00; Round 2	Donegal	1-8 - 2-14	Armagh	O'Donnell Park; Referee: C Cunning (Antrim)
21 February 2016; 14:00; Round 2	L Henderson 0-6 (6f), P Hannigan 1-0, J Boyle, S McVeigh 0-1 each.	Report	R Gaffney 0-8 (6f), C Corvan 1-2, D McKenna 1-0, S Keenan, J Corvan, D Coulter, J King 0-1 each.	O'Donnell Park; Referee: C Cunning (Antrim)

21 February 2016; 14:00; Round 2	Down	4-12 - 0-11	Wicklow	McKenna Park; Referee: J Clarke (Cavan)
21 February 2016; 14:00; Round 2	D Toner (3f) 1-4; S Nicholson (1f) 1-2; C Bailie, R Brannigan 1-1 each; C O'Prey (65), P Sheehan (1f), J McGrath, C Mageean 0-1 each.	Report	S Kelly, D Staunton (4f) 0-4 each; R Keddy 0-2; J Byrne 0-1.	McKenna Park; Referee: J Clarke (Cavan)

21 February 2016; 14:00; Round 2	Meath	2-9 - 0-19	Mayo	St. Loman's Park; Referee: R McGann (Clare)
21 February 2016; 14:00; Round 2	K Keoghan, S Quigley 1-1 each, J Regan 0-2fs, S Geraghty, J Keena (f), A Gannon, J Toher, T Clarke 0-1 each.	Report	K Feeney 0-7 (5fs), J McManus, S Boland 0-3 each, C Freeman, S Regan 0-2 each, G Nolan, C Scahill 0-1 each.	St. Loman's Park; Referee: R McGann (Clare)

6 March 2016; 12:45; Round 3	Wicklow	2-15 - 2-17	Armagh	Aughrim County Ground
6 March 2016; 12:45; Round 3	C Moorehouse (1-5, 0-5f), D Masterson (0-5, 3f, 2'65), J Henderson (1-0), A Byrne (0-2), R Keddy (0-1), E Kearns (0-1), W Kavanagh (0-1).		R Gaffney (0-8, 6f, 2'65), C Corvan (1-3), J Corvan (1-0), S Gaffney (0-1), K McKernan (0-1), E McGuinness (0-1), C Carvill (0-1), D McKenna (0-1), D Coulter (0-1).	Aughrim County Ground

6 March 2016; 14:00; Round 3	Down	0-16 - 0-20	Mayo	McKenna Park
6 March 2016; 14:00; Round 3	D Toner (0-7f), S Nicholson (0-3), C Woods (0-3), C Bailie (0-3, 1f).		K Feeney (0-13, 5f, 1'65), S Boland (0-3), B Hunt (0-1), G McManus (0-1), C Scahill (0-1), S Mulroy (0-1).	McKenna Park

6 March 2016; 14:00; Round 3	Meath	2-35 - 0-9	Donegal	St. Loman's Park
6 March 2016; 14:00; Round 3	S Clynch (0-12, 6f), A Gannon (1-3), T Clarke (0-6), S Morris (0-4), J Toher (0-4, 1f), L Martyn (1-0), J Keena (0-3), D Healy (0-1), S Geraghty (0-1), S Quigley (0-1).		L Henderson (0-5, 4f, 1'65), S McVeigh (0-3), S Doherty (0-1).	St. Loman's Park

13 March 2016; 12:45; Round 4	Armagh	0-26 - 1-10	Meath	Athletic Grounds; Referee: C Cunning (Antrim)
13 March 2016; 12:45; Round 4	R Gaffney 0-13 (13fs), C Carvill 0-6, C Corvan, C Devlin 0-2 each, D Carvill, D Coulter, S Renaghan 0-1 each.	Report	J Keena 1-3, R Sherlock, S Clynch 0-2 each, A Gannon, T Clarke, N Heffernan 0-1 each.	Athletic Grounds; Referee: C Cunning (Antrim)

13 March 2016; 12:45; Round 4	Mayo	0-13 - 2-14	Wicklow	Elverys, MacHale Park; Referee: K McGeeney (Roscommon)
13 March 2016; 12:45; Round 4	K Feeney 0-9 (9f), G McManus, S Mulroy, S Boland, and E Collins 0-1 each.	Report	C Moorehosue (7, 5f, 2'65), M Lee 1-4, E McCormack 1-0, G Weir and P Doran, M Lee 1-2.	Elverys, MacHale Park; Referee: K McGeeney (Roscommon)

13 March 2016; 13:15; Round 4	Donegal	0-14 - 3-22	Down	O'Donnell Park; Referee: A Ferguson (Fermanagh)
13 March 2016; 13:15; Round 4	L Henderson 0-11 (10f), P Sheridan, P Hannigan, S McVeigh 0-1 each.	Report	D Hughes 1-3, D Toner 0-6 (3f), R Brannigan 1-1, S Nicholson 0-4 (2f), C Egan 1-0, R Campbell, C Woods, B Byres 0-2 each, C O'Prey, A O'Prey 0-1 each.	O'Donnell Park; Referee: A Ferguson (Fermanagh)

20 March 2016; 14:00; Round 5	Armagh	1-17 - 1-10	Mayo	Athletic Grounds; Referee: G McGrath (Wexford)
20 March 2016; 14:00; Round 5	R Gaffney 0-7fs, D Coulter 1-3, C Corvan 0-3, D Carvill 0-2, E McGuinness, K McKernan 0-1 each.	Report	K Feeney 0-6 (3fs, 2 '65s'), P O'Flynn 1-0, C Charlton, C Freeman, G Nolan, C Scahill 0-1 each.	Athletic Grounds; Referee: G McGrath (Wexford)

20 March 2016; 14:00; Round 5	Down	2-17 - 1-14	Meath	McKenna Park; Referee: C Cunning (Antrim)
20 March 2016; 14:00; Round 5	D Toner 0-9 (7fs), R Brannigan, C Mageean 1-0 each, C O'Prey (2fs), S Dineen 0-2 each, S Nicholson, C Woods ('65'), D Hughes, C Egan 0-1 each.	Report	J Keena 0-7 (6fs), K Keena 1-0, K Keoghan 0-3 (3fs), J Toher (2fs), N Heffernan 0-2 each.	McKenna Park; Referee: C Cunning (Antrim)

20 March 2016; 14:00; Round 5	Wicklow	2-27 - 0-17	Donegal	Pearse Park; Referee: B Purke (Kilkenny)
20 March 2016; 14:00; Round 5	M Lee 1-8 (0-4fs), P Doran 1-2, E Kearns 0-4, D Masterson (1f), R Keddy 0-3 each, J Cranley, A Byrne 0-2 each, S Kelly, T Storey, G Weir 0-1 each.	Report	L Henderson 0-6 (5fs), B Lafferty, S McVeigh 0-3 each, P Nelson 0-2, J O'Loughlin, C Mathewson, C Flood 0-1 each.	Pearse Park; Referee: B Purke (Kilkenny)

=== Division 2B Final ===
26 March 2016; 14:00; Final	Down	1-15 - 0-20	Armagh	Páirc Naomh Brídl, Dowdallshill; Referee: P Murphy (Carlow)
26 March 2016; 14:00; Final	D Toner 0-7 (4f), C Egan 1-0, C O' Prey 0-3 (3f), J McGrath 0-2, S Nicholson 0-2, R Brannigan 0-1.	Report	R Gaffney 0-11 (10f), D Coulter 0-4, S Renaghan 0-2, J Corvan, C Corvan, C Devlin 0-1 each.	Páirc Naomh Brídl, Dowdallshill; Referee: P Murphy (Carlow)

=== Division 2B play-off ===
2 April 2016; Play-off	Wicklow	2-19 - 1-9	Donegal	St. Colman's College; Referee: J Clarke (Cavan)
2 April 2016; Play-off	D Masterson (0-11, 0-6f), C Moorhouse (1-2), S Kelly (1-0), A Byrne (0-2), E Kearns (0-1).	Report	C Mathewson (1-2, 0-2f), L Henderson (0-3), S McVeigh (0-2), D Cullen (0-1), K Campbell (0-1).	St. Colman's College; Referee: J Clarke (Cavan)

=== Division 2B Relegation/Promotion play-off ===
9 April 2016; Relegation/Promotion play-off	Donegal	4-9 - 3-13	Roscommon	James Stephens Park, Ballina; Referee: J Keane (Galway)
9 April 2016; Relegation/Promotion play-off	A Murphy 3-0; J Fallon (3f), R O'Meara (2f) 0-3 each; C Egan, T Seale, E Flanagan 0-2 each; M Kelly 0-1.	Report	P Hannigan 2-0; C Mathewson 1-2 (0-1f); L Henderson (4f) 0-4; D Cullen 1-0; B Lafferty, C McDermott, S McVeigh 0-1 each.	James Stephens Park, Ballina; Referee: J Keane (Galway)

=== Statistics ===
Top scorer overall

Rank	Player	Team	Tally	Total	Matches	Average
1	Ryan Gaffney	Armagh	0-53	52	6	8.6
2	Danny Toner	Down	2-39	45	6	7.5
3	Kenny Feeney	Mayo	1-40	43	5	8.6
4	Lee Henderson	Donegal	0-29	29	5	5.8
5	John Keena	Meath	1-22	25	5	5.0
6	Conor Corvan	Armagh	3-14	23	5	4.6

Single game

Rank	Player	Club	Tally	Total	Opposition
1	Kenny Feeney	Mayo	0-13	13	Down
1	Ryan Gaffney	Armagh	0-13	13	Meath
3	Stephen Clynch	Meath	0-12	12	Donegal
4	Mikey Lee	Wicklow	1-8	11	Donegal
4	Lee Henderson	Donegal	0-11	11	Down
4	Ryan Gaffney	Armagh	0-11	11	Down
4	Diarmuid Masterson	Wicklow	0-11	11	Donegal
8	Adrian Murphy	Donegal	3-0	9	Roscommon
8	Danny Toner	Down	1-6	9	Armagh
8	Kenny Feeney	Mayo	0-9	9	Wicklow
8	Danny Toner	Down	0-9	9	Meath

Clean sheets

Rank	Goalkeeper	Team	Clean sheets
1	Shane McGann	Meath	4
1	Stephen Keith	Down	4
3	Donal O'Brien	Mayo	2
3	D O'Neill	Wicklow	2
5	Bob Fitzgerald	Wicklow	1

== Division 3A ==
National League Division 3A
- Season: 2016
- Champions: Roscommon
- Relegated: Warwickshire
- Matches: 16
- Top goalscorer: Damian Casey (2-52)
- Best goalkeeper: Noel Fallon (3 clean sheets)
- Biggest home win: Fingal 4-18 - 1-6 Warwickshire (14 February 2016)
- Biggest away win: Monaghan 2-13 - 2-18 Tyrone (14 February 2016)
- Highest scoring: Louth 2-19 - 2-16 Tyrone (13 March 2016)
- All statistics correct as of 30 March 2016.

On 26 March 2016, Roscommon won the title after a 4-15 to 0-7 win over Monaghan. It was their first league title since 2011 when they claimed the Division 3B title in the old system. The victory also secured automatic promotion to Division 2B for 2017.

At the other end of the table, Warwickshire were relegated after losing all five of their group stage games. They had secured promotion in 2015 but will return to Division 3B in 2017.

Tyrone's Damian Casey was the Division 3A top scorer with 2-52. Roscommon's Noel Fallon was the top goalkeeper having kept 3 clean sheets.

=== Table ===
Champions and possible promotion Relegated team

Team	Pld	W	D	L	F	A	Diff	Pts
Roscommon	5	5	0	0	8-76	5-66	19	10
Monaghan	5	3	0	2	9-69	7-66	9	6
Louth	5	3	0	2	11-68	9-70	4	6
Fingal	5	2	0	3	11-71	11-63	8	4
Tyrone	5	2	0	3	6-82	13-67	-6	4
Warwickshire	5	0	0	5	9-46	9-80	-34	0

- Fingal are ranked ahead of Tyrone as they won the head-to-head match in the league.

=== Rounds 1 to 5 ===
14 February 2016; 14:00; Round 1	Fingal	4-18 - 1-6	Warwickshire	DCU Showgrounds; Referee: M Murtagh
14 February 2016; 14:00; Round 1	L Kelly 1-0, R McGarry 0-4, P Graves 0-1, K O’Sullivan 2-6, 4f, J.M Sheridan 0-4, P Sheridan 0-1, S Owens 0-1, S Goff 0-1, D Cullen 1-0.	Report	S Conlan 0-1, 1f, S Morrissey 1-2, 1f, J Reddan 0-1, K Dwyer 0-1, E O Long 0-1, 1f.	DCU Showgrounds; Referee: M Murtagh

14 February 2016; 14:00; Round 1	Louth	1-14 - 1-16	Roscommon	Louth GAA Centre of Excellence, Darver; Referee: P Burke
14 February 2016; 14:00; Round 1	L Dwan (0-6), S Callan (1-1), D Murphy (0-4), P Lynch (0-1), G Smyth (0-1), D O’Hanrahan (0-1).	Report	J Fallon (0-6, 5 five frees), C Egan (1-1), L Kilcline (1-1), J Kilkenny (0-3), C Dolan (0-2), J Lawlor (0-1), R O' Meara (0-1), T Doyle (0-1).	Louth GAA Centre of Excellence, Darver; Referee: P Burke

14 February 2016; 14:00; Round 1	Monaghan	2-13 - 2-18	Tyrone	St. Mary's Park; Referee: J Connors (Donegal)
14 February 2016; 14:00; Round 1	M Treanor (1-4), S Lambe (0-6f), S Leonard (1-1), F Rafter (0-1), N Garland (0-1).	Report	D Casey (0-10, 8f, 1 ’65), M Mulgrew (1-1), C Grogan (1-0), A Kelly (0-3), R McKernan (0-1), S Óg Grogan (0-1), G Gilmore (0-1), E O’Sullivan (0-1).	St. Mary's Park; Referee: J Connors (Donegal)

20 February 2016; 15:00; Round 2	Warwickshire	2-10 - 2-11	Louth	Páirc na hÉireann
20 February 2016; 15:00; Round 2	S Morrissey (2-5, 2f), J Reddan (0-2), S Conlon (0-1), O Long (0-1), P Crehan (0-1).		L Dwan (1-5, 4f), T Hendry (1-0), D Murphy (0-3, 1f), N Stanley (0-1), G Smyth (0-1), S Callan (0-1).	Páirc na hÉireann

21 February 2016; 14:00; Round 2	Roscommon	1-12 - 0-10	Monaghan	Athleague; Referee: K Brady (Louth)
21 February 2016; 14:00; Round 2	C Egan 0-4, A Murphy 1-0, R O'Meara 0-3, G Fallon 0-2, J Kilkenny, M Kelly (f), E Flanagan 0-1 each.	Report	N Garland 0-5 (5fs), S Lambe 0-3 (2fs), F Rafter, M Treanor 0-1 each.	Athleague; Referee: K Brady (Louth)

21 February 2016; 14:00; Round 2	Tyrone	1-17 - 4-10	Fingal	Healy Park; Referee: A Ferguson (Armagh)
21 February 2016; 14:00; Round 2	D Casey 0-12 (8fs), C Grogan 1-1, T Morgan 0-2, C Cross, G Gilmore 0-1 each.	Report	JM Sheridan 2-0, K O'Sullivan 1-8 (0-5fs), TJ Howard 1-1, R McGarry 0-1.	Healy Park; Referee: A Ferguson (Armagh)

5 March 2016; 17:00; Round 3	Tyrone	0-17 - 1-12	Warwickshire	Healy Park; Referee: J Clarke (Cavan)
5 March 2016; 17:00; Round 3	D Casey 0-12, A Kelly 0-2, J Kelly 0-1, G Gilmore 0-1, M Mulgrew 0-1.	Report	P Crehan (0-5), S Morrissey (1-0), P Treacy (0-1), J Meagher (0-1), L Reale (0-1), C Robins (0-1), J Reddan (0-1), O Long (0-1).	Healy Park; Referee: J Clarke (Cavan)

6 March 2016; 13:00; Round 3	Monaghan	2-19 - 1-12	Louth	St. Mary's Park; Referee: C Cunning
6 March 2016; 13:00; Round 3	S Lambe (1-6, 0-3f), F Rafter (1-2), C Boyle (0-4, 3f), B McGuigan (0-2), M Treanor (0-2), N Garland (0-1), D Crowe (0-1f), S McNally (0-1).		L Dwan (0-5), S Connolly (1-1), D Murphy (0-3), S Callan (0-1), A McCrave (0-1), G McKeown (0-1).	St. Mary's Park; Referee: C Cunning

6 March 2016; 13:00; Round 3	Roscommon	1-14 - 0-16	Fingal	Athleague; Referee: R McCann
6 March 2016; 13:00; Round 3	E Flanagan (0-4), J Fallon (0-4, 3f, 1'65), T Seale (1-0), A Murphy (0-3), C Dolan (0-3).		JM Sheridan (0-10, 7f), P Sheridan (0-3, 1f), K O'Flynn (0-1), E O'Connor (0-1), P Graves (0-1).	Athleague; Referee: R McCann

12 March 2016; 15:00; Round 4	Warwickshire	3-12 - 1-21	Roscommon	Páirc na hÉireann; Referee: J Murphy (Limerick)
12 March 2016; 15:00; Round 4	P Crehan 2-7 (7fs), O Long 1-0, L Reale 0-3, S Morrissey, C Robins 0-1 each.	Report	G Fallon 0-12 (8fs, 2 65s), E Flanagan 1-3, C Egan 0-3, S Curley, A Murphy, M Kelly 0-1 each.	Páirc na hÉireann; Referee: J Murphy (Limerick)

13 March 2016; 14:00; Round 4	Fingal	1-18 - 3-14	Monaghan	Swords; Referee: G Quilty (Kilkenny)
13 March 2016; 14:00; Round 4	JM Sheridan 0-8(3f), E Thynne 1-1, I Furlong 0-4, P Graves 0-2, R McGarry, L Kelly, P Sheridan 0-1 each.	Report	S Lambe 1-6(3f), M Treanor 1-1, B McGuigan 1-1, N Garland 0-4(3f), D Crowe, F Rafter 0-1 each.	Swords; Referee: G Quilty (Kilkenny)

13 March 2016; 14:00; Round 4	Louth	2-19 - 2-16	Tyrone	Darver; Referee: D Hughes (Carlow)
13 March 2016; 14:00; Round 4	L Dwan 1-6 (0-6fs); Shane Calla, G Smyth 0-4 each; A Mackin 1-0; N Stanley 0-3; D Murphy 0-2.	Report	D Casey 1-11 (0-6fs); G Gilmore 1-2; J Kelly, A Kelly, S Óg Grogan 0-1 each.	Darver; Referee: D Hughes (Carlow)

19 March 2016; 16:00; Round 5	Monaghan	2-13 - 2-6	Warwickshire	St. Tiernach's Park
19 March 2016; 16:00; Round 5	S Lambe 0-7, M Treanor 1-2, R Curran 1-0, F Rafter 0-2, B McGuigan 0-2.		L Teale 1-0, O Long 1-0, S Morrissey 0-2, P Crehan 0-2, C Robins 0-1, K Boxwell 0-1.	St. Tiernach's Park

20 March 2016; 14:00; Round 5	Louth	5-12 - 2-8	Fingal	Darver; Referee: G Quilty (Kilkenny)
20 March 2016; 14:00; Round 5	D Murphy 2-2 (0-1f, 1-0 pen), S Connolly 2-1, D Kettle 1-1, P Lynch 0-3 (1 sl, 1f) N Stanley, S Callan 0-2 each, R Byrne 0-1.	Report	P Graves 1-1, TJ Howard 1-0, JM Sheridan 0-4 (3fs), L Kelly, R McGarry, K O'Sullivan 0-1 each.	Darver; Referee: G Quilty (Kilkenny)

20 March 2016; 14:00; Round 5	Roscommon	4-13 - 1-14	Tyrone	Athleague; Referee: J Murphy (Limerick)
20 March 2016; 14:00; Round 5	R O'Meara 2-1, J Fallon 0-7 (6fs), A Murphy 1-1, N Connaughton 1-0, M Kelly 0-2fs, T Seale, C Egan 0-1 each.	Report	D Casey 1-7 (1-4fs), G Gilmore 0-2, P McKillion, C Grogan, E O'Sullivan, C McNulty, P Daly 0-1 each.	Athleague; Referee: J Murphy (Limerick)

=== Division 3A Final ===
26 March 2016; 16:00; Final	Roscommon	4-15 - 0-7	Monaghan	Aodh Ruadh, Ballyshannon; Referee: M MUrtagh (Westmeath)
26 March 2016; 16:00; Final	C Egan (2-2), J Fallon (0-6, 4 frees, 1 sideline), M Kelly (0-3), A Murphy, C Duignan (1-0) each, T Seale (0-2), N Connaughton, R O’Meara (0-1) each.	Report	S Lambe (0-5, 4 frees), C McKenna, F Rafter (0-1) each.	Aodh Ruadh, Ballyshannon; Referee: M MUrtagh (Westmeath)

=== Division 3A Relegation/Promotion play-off ===
9 April 2016; Relegation/Promotion play-off	Tyrone	1-24 - 1-19 (a.e.t.)	Fermanagh	Aodh Ruadh, Ballyshannon
9 April 2016; Relegation/Promotion play-off	D Casey 0-15 (9fs, 2 '65s'), A Kelly 1-0, C Grogan 0-3, A Kelly 0-2, T Morgan, S Og Grogan, E O'Sullivan, R McKernan 0-1 each.	Report	D Teague 1-2, S Corrigan 0-12 (9fs, 1 '65'), JP McGarry 0-3, F McBrien, R Bogue 0-1 each.	Aodh Ruadh, Ballyshannon

=== Statistics ===
Top scorer overall

Rank	Player	Team	Tally	Total	Matches	Average
1	Damian Casey	Tyrone	2-52	58	5	11.6
2	Stephen Lambe	Monaghan	2-33	39	6	6.5
3	Gerry Fallon	Roscommon	0-37	37	6	6.16
4	John Matthew Sheridan	Fingal	2-26	32	5	6.4
5	Liam Dwan	Louth	2-22	28	4	7.0
6	Kieran O'Sullivan	Fingal	3-15	24	4	6.0
7	Shane Morrissey	Warwickshire	4-10	22	5	4.40
8	Pauric Crehan	Warwickshire	2-15	21	4	5.25
9	Diarmuid Murphy	Louth	2-14	20	5	4.0
10	Mark Treanor	Monaghan	3-10	19	6	3.16

Single game

Rank	Player	Team	Tally	Total	Opposition
1	Damian Casey	Tyrone	1-11	14	Louth
2	Pauric Crehan	Warwickshire	2-7	13	Roscommon
3	Kieran O'Sullivan	Fingal	2-6	12	Warwickshire
3	Damian Casey	Tyrone	0-12	12	Fingal
3	Damian Casey	Tyrone	0-12	12	Warwickshire
3	Gerry Fallon	Roscommon	0-12	12	Warwickshire
7	Shane Morrissey	Warwickshire	2-5	11	Louth
7	Kieran O'Sullivan	Fingal	1-8	11	Tyrone
9	Damian Casey	Tyrone	1-7	10	Roscommon
9	Damian Casey	Tyrone	0-10	10	Monaghan
9	John Matthew Sheridan	Fingal	0-10	10	Tyrone

Clean sheets

Rank	Goalkeeper	Team	Clean sheets
1	Noel Fallon	Roscommon	3
2	Michael Cremin	Warwickshire	1

== Division 3B ==
National League Division 3B
- Season: 2016
- Champions: Fermanagh
- Matches: 7
- Top goalscorer: Joe O'Brien (4-26)
- Best goalkeeper: Reuben Murray (1 clean sheet)
- Biggest home win: Longford 3-12 - 0-13 Leitrim (6 March 2016)
- Highest scoring: Sligo 5-13 - 5-21 Longford (20 March 2016)
- All statistics correct as of 21 March 2016.

On 26 March 2016, Fermanagh won the title after a 2-13 to 3-8 win over Longford. It was their first league title since 2013 when they also claimed the Division 3B title.

Longford's Joe O'Brien was the Division 3B top scorer with 3-22. Longford's Reuben Murray was the top goalkeeper having kept one clean sheet.

=== Table ===
Champion and possible promotion

Team	Pld	W	D	L	F	A	Diff	Pts
Fermanagh	3	2	0	1	6-42	5-38	7	4
Longford	3	2	0	1	11-46	8-43	12	4
Leitrim	3	1	0	2	4-39	7-41	-11	2
Sligo	3	1	0	2	8-40	9-45	-8	2

=== Rounds 1 to 3 ===
6 March 2016; 12:45; Round 1	Sligo	1-14 - 1-9	Fermanagh	Markievicz Park; Referee: J Connors (Donegal)
6 March 2016; 12:45; Round 1	K Raymond 0-7 (4fs, 1 '65'), C Brenan 1-0, C Behan (2fs), M Davey, S Kenny 0-2 each, D Kirby 0-1.	Report	D McGarry 1-4 (0-1f), J Duffy 0-2fs, JP McGarry, F McBrien, S Corrigan 0-1 each.	Markievicz Park; Referee: J Connors (Donegal)

6 March 2016; 14:00; Round 1	Longford	3-12 - 0-13	Leitrim	Allen Park; Referee: K McGeeney (Roscommon)
6 March 2016; 14:00; Round 1	C Mullane 2-3, J O'Brien 1-5 (2f), J Casey, P Farrington, K Connelly, J Mulhern 0-1 each.	Report	C Cunniffe 0-7 (4fs, 2 '65s'), B Byrne 0-4 (3fs), P McWeeney, C Moreton 0-1 each.	Allen Park; Referee: K McGeeney (Roscommon)

13 March 2016; 14:00; Round 2	Fermanagh	3-17 - 3-13	Longford	Brewster Park (Enniskillen); Referee: J Clarke (Cavan)
13 March 2016; 14:00; Round 2	S Corrigan 0-10 (6fs, 1 ‘65’), D Teague 1-3, J Duffy 1-1, R Porteous 1-0, P McGarry 0-2, D McGarry 0-1.	Report	J O’Brien 1-7 (0-4fs), C Mullane 1-3, P Farrington 1-1, B Hanley, K Connelly 0-1 each.	Brewster Park (Enniskillen); Referee: J Clarke (Cavan)

13 March 2016; 14:00; Round 2	Leitrim	3-15 - 2-13	Sligo	Páirc Seán Mac Diarmada; Referee: J Connors (Donegal)
13 March 2016; 14:00; Round 2	P O’Donnell 1-7(6fs); Z Moradi 1-4; K McDermott 1-0; C Cunniffe 0-2 (2fs); S Kiernan, J Ryan 0-1 each.	Report	K Raymond 0-8 (5fs); S Kenny 1-3; M Davey 1-0; D Kirby, C Brennan 0-1 each.	Páirc Seán Mac Diarmada; Referee: J Connors (Donegal)

20 March 2016; 14:00; Round 3	Leitrim	1-11 - 2-16	Fermanagh	Páirc Seán Mac Diarmada; Referee: K McGeeney (Roscommon)
20 March 2016; 14:00; Round 3	P O'Donnell 1-9 (1-0 pen, 0-5fs), C Cunniffe, D McGovern 0-1 each	Report	S Corrigan 1-8 (0-3fs), C McShea 1-1, J Duffy 0-3, R Bogue 0-2, T Cleary, J P McGarry 0-1 each.	Páirc Seán Mac Diarmada; Referee: K McGeeney (Roscommon)

20 March 2016; 14:00; Round 3	Sligo	5-13 - 5-21	Longford	Markievicz Park; Referee: M Murtagh
20 March 2016; 14:00; Round 3	S Kenny 3-8 (1-0 pen, 1-5f), K Raymond 1-2 (1-0f), C Brenan 1-0, B O'Loughlin 0-2, L Reidy 0-1	Report	J O'Brien 1-10 (0-10fs), C Mullane 3-3, P Farrington 1-3, K Connelly 0-3, P Walsh and P Corcoran 0-1 each.	Markievicz Park; Referee: M Murtagh

=== Division 3B Final ===
26 March 2016; 14:00; Final	Fermanagh	2-13 - 3-8	Longford	Markievicz Park; Referee: K McGeeney (Roscommon)
26 March 2016; 14:00; Final	S Corrigan 0-5 (3f), R Bogue, C McShea 1-1 each, F McBrien, D Teague 0-2 each, J Duffy, J P McGarry 0-1 each.	Report	J O'Brien 1-4 (3f), C Mullane 2-1, P Walsh, B Hanley, K Conneely 0-1 each.	Markievicz Park; Referee: K McGeeney (Roscommon)

=== Statistics ===
Top scorer overall

Rank	Player	Team	Tally	Total	Matches	Average
1	Joe O'Brien	Longford	4-26	38	4	9.5
2	Cathal Mullane	Longford	8-10	34	4	8.5
3	Seán Corrigan	Fermanagh	1-24	27	4	6.75
4	Seán Kenny	Sligo	4-13	25	3	8.33
5	Pádraig O'Donnell	Leitrim	2-16	22	3	7.3
6	Keith Raymond	Sligo	1-17	20	3	6.66
7	Paddy Farrington	Longford	2-5	11	4	2.75
8	Clement Cunniffe	Leitrim	0-10	10	3	3.33
8	Joe Duffy	Fermanagh	1-7	10	4	2.5
10	Declan McGarry	Fermanagh	1-5	8	3	2.66

Single game

Rank	Player	Team	Tally	Total	Opposition
1	Seán Kenny	Sligo	3-8	17	Longford
2	Joe O'Brien	Longford	1-10	13	Sligo
3	Cathal Mullane	Longford	3-3	12	Sligo
3	Pádraig O'Donnell	Leitrim	1-9	12	Fermanagh
5	Seán Corrigan	Fermanagh	1-8	11	Leitrim
6	Pádraig O'Donnell	Leitrim	1-7	10	Sligo
6	Joe O'Brien	Longford	1-7	10	Fermanagh
6	Seán Corrigan	Fermanagh	0-10	10	Longford
9	Cathal Mullane	Longford	2-3	9	Leitrim
10	Joe O'Brien	Longford	1-5	8	Leitrim
10	Keith Raymond	Sligo	0-8	8	Leitrim

Clean sheets

Rank	Goalkeeper	Team	Clean sheets
1	Reuben Murray	Longford	1
