= 2005 All-Ireland Minor Football Championship =

Gaelic football competition

Championship details

All-Ireland Champions
- Winning team: Down (4th win)

All-Ireland Finalists
- Losing team: Mayo

Provincial Champions
- Munster: Cork
- Leinster: Laois
- Ulster: Armagh
- Connacht: Galway

The 2005 All-Ireland Minor Football Championship was the 74th staging of the All-Ireland Minor Football Championship, the Gaelic Athletic Association's premier inter-county Gaelic football tournament for boys under the age of 18.

Tyrone entered the championship as defending champions, however, they were defeated by Down in the Ulster quarter-final.

On 25 September 2005, Down won the championship following a 1–15 to 0–8 defeat of Mayo in the All-Ireland final. This was their fourth All-Ireland title overall and their first title in six championship seasons.

== Results ==
=== Connacht Minor Football Championship ===
Rob Robin

2005 Rob Robin	Leitrim	0-7 - 0-6	Sligo	Páirc Seán Mac Diarmada, Carrick-on-Shannon

2005 Rob Robin	Leitrim	3-8 - 2-15	Galway	Páirc Seán Mac Diarmada, Carrick-on-Shannon

2005 Rob Robin	Sligo	1-10 - 0-8	Roscommon	Markievicz Park, Sligo

2005 Rob Robin	Sligo	0-13 - 0-7	Galway	Markievicz Park, Sligo

2005 Rob Robin	Roscommon	1-16 - 1-7	Leitrim	Knockcroghery

2005 Rob Robin	Sligo	0-9 - 0-3	Leitrim	Páirc Seán Mac Diarmada, Carrick-on-Shannon

Semi-Finals

2005 Semi-Final	Mayo	4-12 - 0-7	Roscommon	McHale Park, Castlebar

2005 Semi-Final	Galway	1-10 - 1-7	Sligo	Pearse Stadium, Galway

Final

10 July 2005 Final	Galway	0-10 - 0-9	Mayo	Pearse Stadium, Galway

=== Leinster Minor Football Championship ===
Rob Robin

2005 Rob Robin	Westmeath	0-10 - 0-10	Offaly	Rosemount

2005 Rob Robin	Dublin	1-11 - 0-8	Laois	Stradbally

2005 Rob Robin	Kildare	2-11 - 0-8	Meath	Longwood

2005 Rob Robin	Dublin	0-11 - 1-8	Westmeath

2005 Rob Robin	Meath	2-11 - 0-10	Offaly

2005 Rob Robin	Laois	3-10 - 0-6	Kildare

2005 Rob Robin	Dublin	6-10 - 0-4	Meath

2005 Rob Robin	Kildare	1-12 - 1-8	Offaly

2005 Rob Robin	Laois	3-7 - 0-2	Westmeath

2005 Rob Robin	Kildare	1-11 - 2-5	Dublin

2005 Rob Robin	Laois	0-9 - 0-7	Offaly

2005 Rob Robin	Meath	3-8 - 2-6	Westmeath

2005 Rob Robin	Kildare	1-19 - 0-3	Westmeath

2005 Rob Robin	Laois	1-13 - 1-8	Meath

2005 Rob Robin	Offaly	3-8 - 2-7	Dublin

2005 Rob Robin	Longford	1-15 - 0-8	Kilkenny	Ballymahon

2005 Rob Robin	Carlow	2-9 - 0-5	Wexford	Dr. Cullen Park, Carlow

2005 Rob Robin	Louth	2-6 - 3-8	Wicklow	Wicklow

2005 Rob Robin	Longford	1-10 - 0-5	Wexford

2005 Rob Robin	Louth	3-12 - 2-3	Kilkenny

2005 Rob Robin	Carlow	1-6 - 0-9	Wicklow

2005 Rob Robin	Carlow	2-13 - 1-5	Kilkenny

2005 Rob Robin	Louth	1-5 - 1-4	Longford

2005 Rob Robin	Wexford	1-10 - 0-12	Wicklow

2005 Rob Robin	Louth	1-9 - 0-8	Carlow

2005 Rob Robin	Wicklow	1-9 - 1-6	Longford

2005 Rob Robin	Wicklow	0-13 - 0-5	Kilkenny

2005 Rob Robin	Louth	4-10 - 0-6	Wexford

2005 Rob Robin	Longford	2-11 - 2-4	Carlow

2005 Rob Robin	Longford	0-13 - 1-7	Kilkenny

2005 Rob Robin	Carlow	1-13 - 2-10	Wexford

2005 Rob Robin	Kilkenny	2-7 - 0-9	Louth	Drogheda Park, Drogheda

2005 Rob Robin	Wexford	3-11 - 1-8	Wicklow	Wexford Park, Wexford

2005 Rob Robin	Longford	0-13 - 0-8	Louth	Killoe

2005 Rob Robin	Wicklow	0-14 - 0-7	Carlow	Pearse Park, Arklow

2005 Rob Robin	Westmeath	1-6 - 0-10	Offaly	Cusack Park, Mullingar

2005 Rob Robin	Meath	2-8 - 0-11	Kildare	Páirc Tailteann, Navan

2005 Rob Robin	Dublin	1-15 - 3-6	Wexford	Parnell Park, Dublin

2005 Rob Robin	Laois	3-10 - 0-7	Longford	Killoe

2005 Rob Robin	Offaly	0-13 - 1-9	Meath	Cusack Park, Mullingar

Semi-Final

2005 Semi-Final	Laois	3-8 - 1-7	Dublin	Dr. Cullen Park, Carlow

Final

17 July 2005 Final	Laois	1-12 - 1-7	Offaly	Croke Park, Dublin

=== Munster Minor Football Championship ===
Rob Robin

2005 Rob Robin	Limerick	1-6 - 2-15	Kerry	Gaelic Grounds, Limerick

2005 Rob Robin	Clare	1-6 - 0-8	Cork	FitzGerald Park, Kilmallock

2005 Rob Robin	Tipperary	7-12 - 1-1	Waterford	Páirc Mac Gearailt, Fermoy

2005 Rob Robin	Cork	1-16 - 1-0	Waterford	Páirc Mac Gearailt, Fermoy

2005 Rob Robin	Cork	0-9 - 1-3	Limerick	Gaelic Grounds, Limerick

Semi-Finals

2005 Semi-Final	Cork	3-14 - 0-7	Limerick	Gaelic Grounds, Limerick

2005 Semi-Final	Clare	2-6 - 1-17	Kerry	Austin Stack Park, Tralee

Final

10 July 2005 Final	Cork	3-8 - 1-11	Kerry	Páirc Uí Chaoimh, Cork

=== Ulster Minor Football Championship ===
Rob Robin

10 July 2005 Rob Robin	Armagh	0-14 - 2-3	Fermanagh	St Tiernach's Park, Clones

10 July 2005 Rob Robin	Down	2-10 - 0-15	Tyrone	Healy Park, Omagh

10 July 2005 Rob Robin	Cavan	1-13 - 1-5	Antrim	Breffni Park, Cavan

10 July 2005 Rob Robin	Monaghan	0-8 - 0-17	Derry	Healy Park, Omagh

10 July 2005 Rob Robin	Armagh	2-10 - 0-12	Donegal	Healy Park, Omagh

Semi-Finals

10 July 2005 Semi-Final	Cavan	0-15 - 1-12	Down	St Oliver Plunkett Park, Crossmaglen

10 July 2005 Semi-Final Replay	Down	0-13 - 1-9	Cavan	St Oliver Plunkett Park, Crossmaglen

Final

10 July 2005 Final	Armagh	0-11 - 0-10	Down	Croke Park, Dublin

=== All-Ireland Minor Football Championship ===
Quarter-Finals

2005 Quarter-Final	Armagh	1-6 - 0-10	Mayo	Dr. Hyde Park, Roscommon

2005 Quarter-Final	Cork	0-10 - 1-9	Offaly	O'Moore Park, Portlaoise

2005 Quarter-Final	Galway	2-11 - 1-17	Down	Páirc Seán Mac Diarmada, Carrick-on-Shannon

2005 Quarter-Final	Kerry	0-14 - 1-4	Laois	Gaelic Grounds, Limerick

Semi-Finals

2005 Semi-Final	Down	1-15 - 1-7	Offaly	Páirc Tailteann, Navan

2005 Semi-Final	Kerry	0-14 - 1-12	Mayo	Croke Park, Dublin

Final

25 September 2005 Final	Down	1-15 - 0-08	Mayo	Croke Park, Dublin

== Championship statistics ==
=== Miscellaneous ===
- Down become the second team to win the All-Ireland title via the "back door". They had earlier been defeated by Armagh in the Ulster final.
- Note: List of Leinster MFC results above contain some Leinster Minor Football League results (hence not exclusive MFC list).
