= Robert Topfer =

Robert Neil Topfer is Director of the investment and advisory firm Taemas Group and Director of the Nextt Group. He was global head of corporate and structured finance with Babcock & Brown before its demise saw shareholders lose the value of their investment, and held significant investments in Tricom and Eircom Holdings.
