= Cathal Magee =

Cathal Magee (born 1954) was the chief executive officer of the Health Service Executive (HSE) in Ireland from 2010 to 2012. He is also a non-executive director of insurance company Vhi Healthcare. Magee was born in County Cavan.

== Education ==
He holds a first class honours degree in Management from the IMI and a MSc in Organizational Behaviour from Trinity College, Dublin.

== Career ==
He worked for the National Australia Bank Group in the UK and Ireland. He was director of human resources and business restructuring with Bord na Móna. He joined Telecom Éireann, now Eircom, in 1995 as group human resources director, then as head of the company's retail arm. He spent six months as acting chief executive of the company in 2009, during which time he started a major restructuring of Eircom's cost base following negotiations with its trade unions, and helped to scuttle Australian financier Rob Topfer's attempt to capture the business cheaply. He served as acting CEO until Paul Donovan was appointed full-time chief executive. He resigned his positions at Eircom in February 2010.

In May 2010, it was announced that Magee would succeed Professor Brendan Drumm as Chief Executive Officer of the HSE. It was stated that Magee was the third choice for the job, behind original front-runner and Minister for Health, Mary Harney's, stated favourite, Professor Tom Keane—and behind Mike Read, an experienced Australian health administrator. Both of these candidates had the advantage of coming from outside the Irish system; Magee's early career was in the health boards, regional precursors to the HSE.

A board member of Vhi Healthcare, the new chief executive has a particularly strong background in human resources. In his time with Eircom, he was noted for adopting a low-key, conciliatory approach to the unions, while at the same time delivering a major reform package for the telecoms company.

He formally began his role on 1 September 2010 for a five-year term. In May Magee said the executive had nearly €1 billion less to spend this year than in 2010 but the demands on it continued to increase, with 7,000 extra attendances at hospital emergency departments in the first three months of this year alone. He said the system was not currently working well enough for the patient, as evidenced by waiting list figures and the number of patients on trolleys in emergency departments each day. The neglect of primary care had contributed to overcrowding in emergency departments but the new Government planned to move care to the community, he said. He described the Government’s plan to provide free GP care to all by 2016 as promised by Fine Gael during the 2011 General Election as “ambitious”, but said “everyone is supportive of that objective if it can be delivered”.

Magee in his first annual report published on 15 June 2011 found that the financial and service information systems in the HSE “are not fit for purpose”. He refers to the fact that the executive was an amalgamation of 17 different bodies and has absorbed a further eight bodies since its formation in 2005, “Today, five years on, it still largely resembles a federation of former autonomous entities, rather than a coherent single integrated organisation model with a shared identity and mission,” he says. Magee also says “a legacy administrative culture still prevails” in the executive “reinforced in recent years through the highly centralised and rigid public service control. It is seriously out of line with the requirements, the demands and challenges of a dynamic 24/7 operating environment.

On 18 July 2012 it was announced that Magee would leave his post at the HSE. The Health Service Executive Governance Bill 2012 provides for a Director General and six Directorates. It covers areas such as hospitals, primary care and public health. Dr James Reilly said the changes will improve patient care and make the system more accountable to the minister. He said that Magee wrote to the Department of Health on Friday 13 July 2012 indicating his intention to step down. Magee has waived his right to compensation for his remaining three years. Dr Reilly said Mr Magee had not resigned and will be leaving during the transition period. The changes come at a crucial time for the HSE, with a budget overrun of €280m and a projected overrun of €500m by the end of the year. It was announced that Tony O'Brien will take over from Magee.

== Family ==
Magee lives with his American-born wife Rosaleen and their family in County Wicklow. They have four children—two sons and two daughters.
