= Cahal Carvill =

Armagh hurler

Personal information
- Native name: Cathal Mac Cearbhaill (Irish)
- Born: 22 April 1987 (age 39) Middletown, County Armagh; Northern Ireland
- Occupation: Solicitor
- Height: 5 ft 8 in (173 cm)

Sport
- Sport: Hurling
- Position: Centre-forward
Club
- Years: Club
- 2004–: Middletown Na Fianna
Club titles
- Armagh titles: 14
College
- Years: College
- 2005–2008: Queen's University Belfast
College titles
- Sigerson titles: 1
Inter-county
- Years: County
- 2006–: Armagh
Inter-county titles
- Ulster titles: 1
- NHL: 2
- All Stars: 3

Cahal Carvill (born 22 April 1987) is a hurler who plays as a centre-forward at senior level for the Armagh county team.

Carvill made his debut on the inter-county scene as a dual player for the Armagh minor teams. He played for several seasons in this grade, and won an Ulster Minor Football Championship medal as a Gaelic footballer, coming on as a late substitute in both the semi-final and final, and an All-Ireland medal as a hurler in the C competition. Carvill subsequently joined the Armagh under-21 hurling and football teams, winning an All-Ireland hurling medal at C level. By that stage he had also joined the Armagh senior hurling team, making his debut in 2006, and going on to win two Nicky Rackard Cup medals (the fourth-highest senior inter-county championship overall in hurling) and two lower National Hurling League medals.

== Honours ==
Queen's University Belfast

- Sigerson Cup (1): 2007

Middleton Na Fianna

- Ulster Intermediate Club Hurling Championship (2): 2011, 2017
- Armagh Senior Hurling Championship (14): 2006, 2009, 2011, 2012, 2015, 2016, 2017, 2019, 2020, 2021, 2022, 2023, 2024, 2025

Armagh

- Nicky Rackard Cup (2): 2010, 2012
- National Hurling League Division 2B (1): 2016 (c)
- National Hurling League Division 3 (1): 2006
- Ulster Minor Football Championship (1): 2005

Awards

- Christy Ring Cup Champion 15 (1): 2011
