= Patrick Kelly (Clare hurler) =

Irish hurler (born 1986)

Personal information
- Native name: Pádraig Ó Ceallaigh (Irish)
- Nickname: Pa
- Born: 30 September 1986 (age 40) Ennis, County Clare, Ireland
- Occupation: Accountant
- Height: 1.8 m (5 ft 11 in)

Sport
- Sport: Hurling
- Position: Goalkeeper
Club
- Years: Club
- 2008-present: Inagh-Kilnamona
Club titles
- Clare titles: 0
Inter-county*
Years	County	Apps (scores)
2008-2018	Clare	17 (0-01)
Inter-county titles
- Munster titles: 0
- All-Irelands: 1
- NHL: 1
- All Stars: 0
- *Inter County team apps and scores correct as of 14:38, 15 December 2018.

Patrick Kelly (born 30 September 1986) is an Irish hurler who plays as a goalkeeper for club side Inagh-Kilnamona and is a former member of the Clare senior hurling team.

Kelly attended NUI Galway.

== Playing career ==
=== St. Flannan's College ===
Kelly first enjoyed major success playing with the St. Flannan's College team.

In 2005 he was in goal as St. Flannan's faced Thurles CBS in the provincial decider, and made a great save to deny Brian Moran and an almost certain Thurles comeback. A 1–11 to 1–6 victory gave Kelly a Harty Cup medal. The subsequent All-Ireland decider saw St. Flannan's face St. Kieran's College. Kelly was singled out for particular praise in the 2–15 to 2–12 victory, giving him an All-Ireland medal.

=== Inagh-Kilnamona ===
Kelly plays his club hurling with Inagh-Kilnamona.

In 2007 he won a championship medal in the under-21 grade.

=== Clare ===
==== Under-21 ====
Kelly was overlooked by the selectors for the Clare minor team, however, he was added to the Clare under-21 team in his final year of being eligible for the grade. On 17 July 2007, he made his debut in a 2–14 to 1-11 Munster semi-final defeat by Cork.

==== Senior ====
Kelly was added to the Clare senior panel by new manager Mike McNamara in 2008. He was an unused substitute throughout the entire National League and subsequent championship campaigns. On 29 March 2009, Kelly made his competitive debut in a 3–16 to 1-09 National League defeat by Kilkenny at Cusack Park.

Over the next two seasons Kelly was an unused substitute, however, in 2012 he became first-choice goalkeeper. On 7 April 2012, he claimed his first silverware at senior level when Clare defeated Limerick by 0–21 to 1–16 to secure the National League Division 1B title. Kelly subsequently made his Munster Championship debut on 17 June 2012 in a 1–18 to 2–17 defeat by Waterford.

On 10 February 2013, Kelly won a Waterford Crystal Cup title after a 1–21 to 1–13 defeat of Tipperary in the final at Semple Stadium. On 8 September 2013, he lined out in goal in the All-Ireland final against Cork having earlier lost the Munster semi-final to the same opposition. Kelly made a number of key saves which denied Daniel Kearney and Anthony Nash goals from frees and the game ended in a 0–25 to 3–16 draw after a last-second point from corner-back Domhnall O'Donovan. The replay on 28 September 2013 also saw Kelly concede three goals, however, a hat-trick by Clare's Shane O'Donnell and further goals from Conor McGrath and Darach Honan secured a 5–16 to 3–16 victory for Clare and an All-Ireland medal for Kelly. He ended the season by being nominated for an All-Star award.

Kelly fell out of favour with the Clare selectors and was dropped as first-choice goalkeeper in favour of Donal Tuohy for the 2014 season. Over the next few seasons, Kelly and Tuohy alternated the goalkeeping position.

On 14 December 2018, Kelly announced his retirement from inter-county hurling.

=== Munster ===
In 2013 Kelly was sub goalkeeper to Anthony Nash on the Munster inter-provincial team. It was a successful campaign, as he claimed his first winners' medal following a 1–22 to 0–15 defeat of Connacht.

== Career statistics ==
=== Inter-county ===
Team	Year	National League			Munster		All-Ireland		Total	
Team	Year	Division	Apps	Score	Apps	Score	Apps	Score	Apps	Score
Clare	2008	Division 1B	0	0-00	0	0-00	0	0-00	0	0-00
Clare	2009	Division 1	3	0-00	0	0-00	0	0-00	3	0-00
Clare	2010	Division 2	0	0-00	0	0-00	0	0-00	0	0-00
Clare	2011	Division 2	0	0-00	0	0-00	0	0-00	0	0-00
Clare	2012	Division 1B	6	0-00	1	0-01	2	0-00	9	0-01
Clare	2013	Division 1A	6	0-01	2	0-00	6	0-00	14	0-00
Clare	2014	Division 1A	2	0-00	0	0-00	2	0-01	4	0-01
Clare	2015	Division 1A	5	0-00	1	0-00	2	0-00	8	0-00
Clare	2016	Division 1B	7	0-00	1	0-00	0	0-00	8	0-00
Clare	2017	Division 1A	2	0-00	0	0-00	0	0-00	2	0-00
Clare	2018	Division 1A	0	0-00	0	0-00	0	0-00	0	0-00
Total			31	0-01	5	0-01	12	0-00	48	0-02

== Honours ==
=== Team ===
St. Flannan's College

- All-Ireland Colleges' Senior Hurling Championship (1): 2005
- Munster Colleges' Senior Hurling Championship (1): 2005

Inagh-Kilnamona

- Clare Under-21 Hurling Championship (1): 2007

Clare

- All-Ireland Senior Hurling Championship (1): 2013
- National Hurling League (1): 2016
- National Hurling League Division 1B (1): 2012
- Waterford Crystal Cup (1): 2013

Munster

- Railway Cup (1): 2012 (sub)
