= Cathal McCabe =

Cathal McCabe (born 1963 in County Down, Northern Ireland), grew up in Warrenpoint. Educated at St Colman's College, Newry, and at the universities of York and Oxford, he lived in Poland for fifteen years where he lectured at the University of Łódź and worked as Literature Consultant with The British Council in Warsaw. From 2003 until 2009 he was Director of the Irish Writers’ Centre in Dublin. Winner of the 2004 Strong Award for Poetry, he was shortlisted for the 2010 Hennessy XO Literary Award in the category Best Emerging Poet. With Founding Patron Seamus Heaney, he established The Ireland-Poland Cultural Foundation (which he continues to direct) and, with Heaney, was awarded (in 2010) the Polish government's prestigious Gloria Artis medal for outstanding services to Polish culture. He lives with his family near Rostrevor, County Down.

His first published collection is Outer Space: Selected Poems (June 2016), published by Metre Editions, an imprint of Metre poetry magazine (1996–2004), edited by David Wheatley and Justin Quinn.

== Poems in magazines ==
- at the New Yorker

in the Times Literary Supplement

- ‘To Elizabeth Bishop’
- at the Irish Times
- at the Manchester Review

== Ireland-Poland Cultural Foundation ==
- IPCF Home

== Poetry Collection ==
- Outer Space: Selected Poems (Metre Editions, June 2016)
