= 2004 All-Ireland Minor Football Championship =

Gaelic football competition

Championship details

All-Ireland Champions
- Winning team: Tyrone (6th win)

All-Ireland Finalists
- Losing team: Kerry

Provincial Champions
- Munster: Kerry
- Leinster: Laois
- Ulster: Tyrone
- Connacht: Galway

The 2004 All-Ireland Minor Football Championship was the 73rd staging of the All-Ireland Minor Football Championship, the Gaelic Athletic Association's premier inter-county Gaelic football tournament for boys under the age of 18. Laois entered the championship as defending champions, however, they were defeated by Kerry in the All-Ireland semi-final.

On 26 September 2004, Tyrone won the championship following a 0-12 to 0-10 defeat of Kerry in the All-Ireland final. This was their sixth All-Ireland title overall and their first title in three championship seasons.

== Results ==
=== Connacht Minor Football Championship ===
Quarter-Final

2004 Quarter-Final	Leitrim	0-12 - 0-9	Leitrim	Dr. Hyde Park, Roscommon

Semi-Finals

2004 Semi-Final	Leitrim	1-11 - 1-10	Leitrim	Dr. Hyde Park, Roscommon

2004 Semi-Final	Galway	1-12 - 1-10	Mayo	McHale Park, Castlebar

Final

18 July 2004 Final	Galway	3-10 - 2-10	Roscommon	McHale Park, Castlebar

=== Leinster Minor Football Championship ===
Rob Robin

2004 Rob Robin	Wexford	0-9 - 1-5	Kilkenny	Nowlan Park, Kilkenny

2004 Rob Robin	Longford	1-17 - 0-7	Carlow	Pearse Park, Longford

2004 Rob Robin	Louth	2-13 - 0-3	Carlow

2004 Rob Robin	Wicklow	0-16 - 0-2	Kilkenny

2004 Rob Robin	Louth	0-11 - 0-11	Longford

2004 Rob Robin	Wexford	1-8 - 0-9	Wicklow

2004 Rob Robin	Louth	0-8 - 2-8	Longford

2004 Rob Robin	Kildare	1-11 - 0-9	Longford	St Conleth's Park, Newbridge

2004 Rob Robin	Laois	2-15 - 1-5	Meath	Páirc Tailteann, Navan

2004 Rob Robin	Dublin	3-12 - 0-4	Wexford	Wexford Park, Wexford

2004 Rob Robin	Westmeath	1-11 - 3-5	Offaly	Cusack Park, Mullingar

2004 Rob Robin	Westmeath	0-9 - 0-10	Offaly	O'Connor Park, Tullamore

Semi-Finals

2004 Semi-Final	Kildare	1-12 - 0-10	Offaly	O'Moore Park, Portlaoise

2004 Semi-Final	Laois	3-7 - 1-9	Dublin	Dr. Cullen Park, Carlow

Final

18 July 2004 Final	Laois	0-10 - 0-6	Kildare	Croke Park, Dublin

=== Munster Minor Football Championship ===
Rob Robin

2004 Rob Robin	Kerry	1-10 - 0-4	Clare	Cusack Park, Ennis

2004 Rob Robin	Tipperary	1-12 - 0-6	Limerick	Páirc Mac Gearailt, Fermoy

2004 Rob Robin	Cork	0-22 - 0-3	Waterford	Lemybrien

2004 Rob Robin	Clare	2-9 - 3-4	Limerick	Gaelic Grounds, Limerick

2004 Rob Robin	Clare	1-9 - 1-12	Waterford	Fraher Field, Dungarvan

Semi-Finals

2004 Semi-Final	Cork	3-15 - 0-7	Waterford	Fraher Field, Dungarvan

2004 Semi-Final	Kerry	1-13 - 1-5	Tipperary	Gaelic Grounds, Limerick

Final

11 July 2004 Final	Kerry	0-9 - 0-9	Cork	Gaelic Grounds, Limerick

18 July 2004 Final Replay	Kerry	0-13 - 1-7	Cork	Páirc Uí Chaoimh, Cork

=== Ulster Minor Football Championship ===
Rob Robin

2004 Rob Robin	Tyrone	2-15 - 1-8	Derry	St Tiernach's Park, Clones

2004 Rob Robin	Cavan	0-11 - 1-12	Down	Casement Park, Belfast

2004 Rob Robin	Armagh	0-11 - 1-8	Monaghan	St Tiernach's Park, Clones

2004 Rob Robin	Armagh	0-19 - 0-11	Monaghan	Breffni Park, Cavan

2004 Rob Robin	Donegal	2-10 - 1-5	Antrim	MacCumhaill Park, Ballybofey

2004 Rob Robin	Tyrone	1-13 - 0-8	Fermanagh	St Tiernach's Park, Clones

2004 Rob Robin	Down	0-14 - 1-7	Armagh	St Tiernach's Park, Clones

Semi-Final

2004 Semi-Final	Tyrone	3-13 - 1-3	Donegal	Brewster Park, Enniskillen

Final

11 July 2004 Final	Tyrone	0-11 - 0-11	Down	Croke Park, Dublin

18 July 2004 Final Replay	Tyrone	0-15 - 0-8	Down	St Tiernach's Park, Clones

=== All-Ireland Minor Football Championship ===
Quarter-finals

August 2004 Quarter-Final	Down	0-15 - 1-11	Galway	Breffni Park, Cavan

August 2004 Quarter-Final	Kerry	2-18 - 1-10	Kildare	Gaelic Grounds, Limerick

August 2004 Quarter-Final	Tyrone	2-15 - 0-2	Roscommon	Breffni Park, Cavan

August 2004 Quarter-Final	Laois	1-9 - 1-9	Cork	Gaelic Grounds, Limerick

August 2004 Quarter-Final Replay	Laois	1-10 - 0-6	Cork	Semple Stadium, Thurles

Semi-finals

22 August 2004 Semi-Final	Tyrone	1-8 - 1-7	Down	Casement Park, Belfast

29 August 2004 Semi-Final	Laois	1-8 - 1-10	Kerry	Croke Park, Dublin

Final

26 September 2004 Final	Tyrone	0-12 - 0-10	Kerry	Croke Park, Dublin
