= Martin Fitzgerald (hurler) =

Kildare hurler

Personal information
- Native name: Máirtín Mac Gearailt (Irish)
- Born: 1991 (age 34–35) Ardclough, County Kildare, Ireland
- Occupation: Business development manager

Sport
- Sport: Hurling
- Position: Midfield
Club
- Years: Club
- Ardclough
Club titles
- Kildare titles: 0
Inter-county
- Years: County
- 2009-present: Kildare
Inter-county titles
- Leinster titles: 0
- All-Irelands: 0
- NHL: 0

Martin Fitzgerald (born 1991) is an Irish hurler who plays as a midfielder at senior level for the Kildare county team.

Born in Ardclough, County Kildare, Fitzgerald was introduced to hurling in his youth. He played with the Holy Family Community School, while simultaneously enjoying championship success at under-age levels with the Ardclough club. Fitzgerald eventually joined the club's senior team.

Fitzgerald made his debut on the inter-county scene at the age of sixteen when he first linked up with the Kildare minor team, before later joining the under-21 team. He made his senior debut during the 2009 league. Fitzgerald has since gone on to play a key role for Kildare, and has won one Christy Ring Cup medal.

Martin once won a "Rear of the year" competition at The Court Nightclubs annual awards night for regulars, but the GPA informed him he couldn't accept the prize money and had to return the award.

He was appointed Kildare captain ahead of the 2019 season.

== Honours ==
=== Team ===
Kildare

- Christy Ring Cup (1): 2014
