= Cahal Pech Village Resort =

Hotel in San Ignacio, Belize

Coordinates: 17.148039°N 89.075325°W

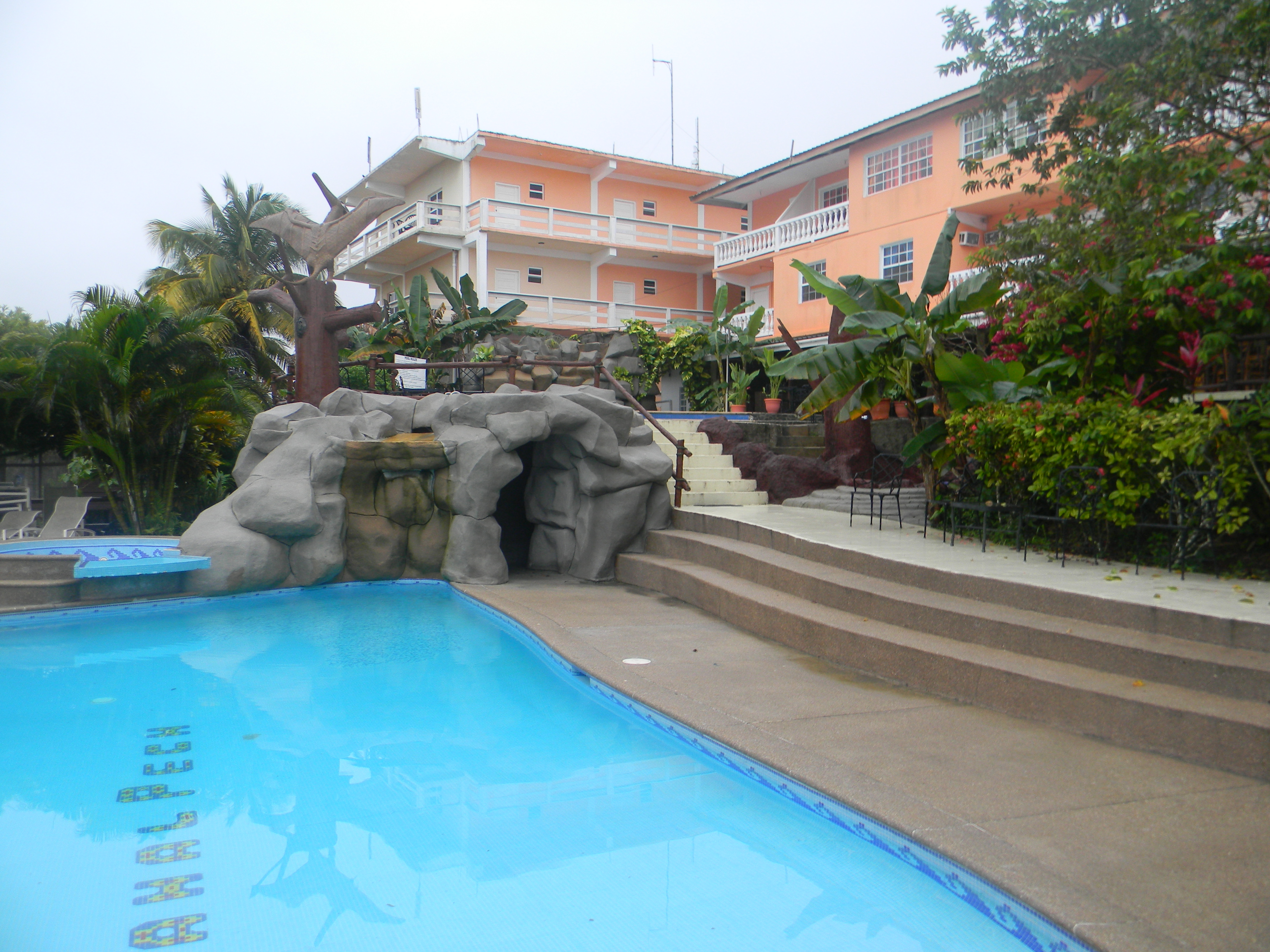
Cahal Pech Village Resort

Cahal Pech Village Resort is one of the largest hotels in San Ignacio, Belize, and sits alongside the ancient Maya Ruins of Cahal Pech. The hotel has been in operation since 1995 and was founded by Daniel and Miriam Silva.

In January 2014, Daniel Silva, the Chairman of the hotel, installed Peter Tonti as its new CEO, Belizean writer and blogger Larry Waight as its Chief Technology Officer and Lloyd Alvarez as the Chief Reservations Manager.
