= Tricom =

In 2008, Tricom was the first Australian broking house in many years to fail to settle its trades with the ASX. Controversially, it held ownership of shares that its borrowers had used margin loans to purchase until the loan was repaid. Tricom would then lend those shares to other traders so that they could be sold, as a form of short selling.
