= Danny Toner =

Northern Irish hurler (born 1990)

Personal information
- Native name: Dónall Ó Tomhnair (Irish)
- Born: 1990 (age 35–36) Ards Peninsula, County Down, Northern Ireland
- Occupation: Gaelic games officer

Sport
- Sport: Hurling
- Position: Midfield
Club
- Years: Club
- Ballygalget
Club titles
- Down titles: 4
Inter-county*
| Years | County | Apps (scores) |
| 2011– | Down | 0 (0–0) |
Inter-county titles
- Ulster titles: 0
- All-Irelands: 0
- NHL: 0
- All Stars: 0
- *Inter County team apps and scores correct as of 22:37, 5 March 2018.

Daniel Toner (born 1992) is a hurler who plays as a midfielder for the Down senior team.

Born in the Ards Peninsula, Toner first played competitive hurling at juvenile and underage levels with the Ballygalget club. He subsequently won four county championship medals with the club's senior team.

Toner made his debut on the inter-county scene when he was selected for the Down minor team in 2008. He played for three championship seasons with the minor team, before later joining the Down under-21 team. Toner made his senior debut during the 2011 league, winning a Christy Ring Cup medal in 2013.

== Career statistics ==
As of match played 25 February 2018.

| Team | Year | National League | | | Ring Cup | | Ulster | | Total | |
| Team | Year | Division | Apps | Score | Apps | Score | Apps | Score | Apps | Score |
|---|---|---|---|---|---|---|---|---|---|---|
| Down | 2011 | Division 2 | 4 | 0–0 | 1 | 0–0 | 2 | 0–1 | 7 | 0–1 |
| Down | 2012 | Division 2B | 6 | 3–6 | 2 | 0–2 | 0 | 0–0 | 8 | 3–8 |
| Down | 2013 | Division 2B | 5 | 3–9 | 5 | 1–6 | 4 | 2–3 | 14 | 6–18 |
| Down | 2014 | Division 2B | 6 | 0–5 | 2 | 0–2 | 0 | 0–0 | 8 | 0–7 |
| Down | 2015 | Division 2B | 5 | 2–16 | 4 | 1–7 | 2 | 1–11 | 11 | 4–34 |
| Down | 2016 | Division 2B | 6 | 2–39 | 4 | 2–13 | 1 | 0–1 | 11 | 4–53 |
| Down | 2017 | Division 2B | 5 | 3–30 | 2 | 0–7 | 0 | 0–0 | 7 | 3–37 |
| Down | 2018 | Division 2B | 3 | 3–6 | 0 | 0–0 | 0 | 0–0 | 3 | 3–6 |
| Total | | | 40 | 16–111 | 20 | 4–37 | 9 | 3–16 | 69 | 23–164 |

== Honours ==
Ballygalget

- Down Senior Hurling Championship (1): 2010, 2013, 2016, 2017

Down

- Christy Ring Cup (1): 2013
