= 2024 Clare county hurling team season =

Hurling competition in Ireland

Clare county hurling team
2024 season
Manager	Brian Lohan
All-Ireland SHC	Winners
Munster SHC	Finalists
National League	Winners
Top scorer Championship	Aidan McCarthy (2-61)
Highest SHC attendance	82,300 (v Cork 21 July))
Lowest SHC attendance	19,418 (v Tipperary 26 May)

The 2024 season was Brian Lohan's fifth year as manager of the Clare senior hurling team since taking over in October 2019.

Clare went on to win their fifth All-Ireland Senior Hurling Championship after a 3–29 to 1–34 win against Cork in the final on 21 July.

== 2024 squad ==
=== Management team ===
- Manager: Brian Lohan
- Selectors: Ken Ralph, Tommy Corbett
- Coaches: Shane Hassett, Brendan Bugler

=== Panel ===
No.	Player	Position	Club
1	Éibhear Quilligan	Goalkeeper	Feakle
2	Rory Hayes	Right Corner Back	Wolfe Tones, Shannon
3	Conor Cleary	Full back	Kilmaley
4	Paul Flanagan	Left Corner Back	Ballyea
5	Diarmuid Ryan	Right half back	Cratloe
6	John Conlon	Centre back	Clonlara
7	David McInerney	Left half back	Tulla
8	David Fitzgerald	Midfield	Inagh-Kilnamona
9	David Reidy	Midfield	Éire Óg, Ennis
10	Cathal Malone	Right half Forward	Sixmilebridge
11	Tony Kelly (C)	Centre forward	Ballyea
12	Shane O'Donnell	Left half Forward	Éire Óg, Ennis
13	Ian Galvin	Right Corner Forward	Clonlara
14	Peter Duggan	Full forward	Clooney-Quin
15	Ryan Taylor	Left Corner Forward	Clooney-Quin

No.	Player	Position	Club
16	Éamonn Foudy	Substitute	Inagh-Kilnamona
17	Paudie Fitzpatrick	Substitute	Sixmilebridge
18	Aron Shanagher	Substitute	Wolfe Tones, Shannon
19	Shane Meehan	Substitute	Banner
20	Aaron Fitzgerald	Substitute	Éire Óg, Ennis
21	Shane Golden	Substitute	Sixmilebridge
22	Darragh Lohan	Substitute	Wolfe Tones, Shannon
23	Cian Nolan	Substitute	Smith O'Brien's, Killaloe
24	Jack Browne	Substitute	Ballyea
25	Domhnall McMahon	Substitute	Tubber
26	Mark Rodgers	Substitute	Scariff

== 2024 Munster Senior Hurling League ==
The 2024 Munster Senior Hurling League, known for sponsorship reasons as the Co-Op Superstores Munster Hurling League, was an inter-county hurling competition in the province of Munster, played by all six county teams in January 2024.

Clare played Limerick in their opening match of the competition on 10 January in Clarecastle on the AstroTurf pitch. Limerick won the game on a 2–21 to 1–19 scoreline. In the second match on 14 January, Cork defeated Clare by 1–24 to 0–24 at Páirc Uí Rinn. After the postponement of multiple games due to inclement weather, the tournament was unfinished.

=== Group A ===
Pos	Team	Pld	W	D	L	PF	PA	PD	Pts	Qualification
1	Limerick	1	1	0	0	27	22	+5	2	Advance to final
2	Cork	1	1	0	0	27	24	+3	2	
3	Clare (E)	2	0	0	2	46	54	−8	0	

Updated to match(es) played on 14 January 2024. Source: Munster GAA
(E) Eliminated

== 2024 National Hurling League ==
The 2024 National Hurling League (NHL), known for sponsorship reasons as the Allianz Hurling League (AHL), was the 93rd season of the National Hurling League, an annual hurling competition held in Ireland for county teams.

On 6 April, Clare defeated Kilkenny by 3–16 to 1–20 to win the final and a fifth league title. Conor Cleary was captain and lifted the cup as Tony Kelly was injured and missed the match.

=== Results ===
4 February 2024; Round 1	Clare	1-25 - 2-19	Cork	Cusack Park; Attendance: 7,380; Referee: M Kennedy (Tipperary)
4 February 2024; Round 1	M Rodgers 0-13 (0-10 f, 0-1 65), S Morey 1-1, D Fitzgerald, D Reidy, R Mounsey, C Malone 0-2 each, D McInerney, S Meehan, G Sheedy 0-1 each.	Report	P Horgan 1-7 (0-7 f), S Kingston 0-3, T O’Connell 1-0, C Lehane, S Barrett 0-2 each, S Twomey, R O’Flynn, C O’Brien, S O’Donoghue, C Joyce 0-1 each.	Cusack Park; Attendance: 7,380; Referee: M Kennedy (Tipperary)

11 February 2024; Round 2	Waterford	1-16 - 0-20	Clare	Walsh Park; Attendance: 3,951; Referee: L Gordon (Galway)
11 February 2024; Round 2	Stephen Bennett 0-6 (6fs), S Walsh 1-1, P Curran, C Ryan, Shane Bennett (2fs) 0-2 each, J Prendergast, P Leavy, D Lyons 0-1 each.	Report	A McCarthy 0-8 (6fs), S Rynne, I Galvin, C Galvin, P Crotty 0-2 each, C Malone, D Fitzgerald, D Reidy, S Meehan 0-1 each.	Walsh Park; Attendance: 3,951; Referee: L Gordon (Galway)

25 February 2024; Round 3	Wexford	1-13 - 0-16	Clare	Chadwicks Wexford Park; Attendance: 4,386; Referee: T Walsh (Waterford)
25 February 2024; Round 3	S Casey 1-4 (1-0 penalty, 0-2 frees), L Chin 0-3 (1 free), C Hearne, C Dunbar, C Byrne-Dunbar, M Fanning (free), J Doran, J O’Connor 0-1 each	Report	D Fitzgerald 0-5, A McCarthy 0-4 (3 frees), M Rodgers 0-2 (1 free), I Galvin, P Crotty, R Mounsey, S Meehan, P Duggan 0-1 each	Chadwicks Wexford Park; Attendance: 4,386; Referee: T Walsh (Waterford)

10 March 2024; Round 4	Clare	0-19 - 0-16	Kilkenny	Cusack Park; Attendance: 6,824; Referee: J Owens (Wexford)
10 March 2024; Round 4	A McCarthy (0-6, frees); D Fitzgerald (0-5); K Smyth (0-2); P Duggan (0-2); C Leen (0-1); D Reidy (0-1); M Rodgers (0-1 free); D Ryan (0-1).	Report	TJ Reid (0-9 frees); J Donnelly (0-3); P Deegan (0-2); D Blanchfield (0-1), E Cody (0-1).	Cusack Park; Attendance: 6,824; Referee: J Owens (Wexford)

16 March 2024; Round 5	Offaly	1-19 - 0-23	Clare	Grant Heating St Brendan's Park; Referee: C Flynn (Westmeath)
16 March 2024; Round 5	E Cahill 0-10 (0-8f, 1 ’65), J Clancy 1-0, L Watkins and S Bourke 0-2 each, D Nally, L Fox, D King, E Kelly and D Maher 0-1 each.	Report	D Conroy 0-5 (0-3f), I Galvin 0-4, P Crotty and D Reidy (0-2) 0-3 each, S Meehan, K Smyth (0-2f) and S Morey 0-2 each, R Hayes and P Donnellan 0-1 each.	Grant Heating St Brendan's Park; Referee: C Flynn (Westmeath)

24 March 2024; Semi-final	Clare	1-24 - 2-13	Tipperary	Laois Hire O'Moore Park; Referee: L Gordon (Galway)
24 March 2024; Semi-final	A McCarthy (0-8, 6 frees, 1 65); D Fitzgerald (1-3); M Rodgers (frees), D Reidy (0-3 each); K Smyth (0-2); D Ryan, D Lohan, A Hogan C Malone, C Galvin (0-1 each).	Report	J Forde (0-6, 5 frees); J Morris (1-2); S Hayes (1-0); D McCormack, A Tynan, W Connors, S Kenneally, S Ryan (free) (0-1 each).	Laois Hire O'Moore Park; Referee: L Gordon (Galway)

6 April 2024; 19:15; Final	Clare	3-16 - 1-20	Kilkenny	FBD Semple Stadium; Attendance: 12,307; Referee: J Murphy (Limerick)
6 April 2024; 19:15; Final	A McCarthy (2-10, 0-9 frees); D Fitzgerald (1-0); M Rodgers (0-2); D Lohan, D Ryan, I Galvin, C Malone (0-1 each).	Report	E Cody (1-4, 0-3 frees); M Keoghan (0-4); A Mullen (0-3); C Kenny (0-2); B Drennan (free), S Murphy, B Ryan, L Blanchfield, R Reid, J Molloy, J Donnelly (0-1 each).	FBD Semple Stadium; Attendance: 12,307; Referee: J Murphy (Limerick)

== 2024 Munster Senior Hurling Championship ==
The 2024 Munster Senior Hurling Championship was the 137th edition of the Munster Senior Hurling Championship since its establishment by the Munster Council in 1888 and is the highest-tier of Hurling for senior county teams in Munster. It is contested by five Munster GAA county teams ranked 1–5 in the 2024 All-Ireland Senior Hurling Championship.

Limerick retained the title for a record sixth year in a row after a 1–26 to 1–20 win against Clare.

=== Final Table ===
Pos	Team	Pld	W	D	L	SF	SA	Diff	Pts	Qualification
1	Limerick	4	3	0	1	8-98	6-78	+26	6	Advance to Munster Final
2	Clare	4	3	0	1	9-89	8-89	+3	6	Advance to Munster Final
3	Cork	4	2	0	2	11-107	9-98	+15	4	Advance to All-Ireland preliminary quarter-finals
4	Waterford	4	1	1	2	9-86	6-103	-8	3	
5	Tipperary	4	0	1	3	2-90	10-102	–36	1	

=== Results ===
21 April 2024 Round 1	Clare	1-18 (21) – (24) 3-15	Limerick	Ennis
2pm		(HT: 1-10 - 0-8)		Venue: Cusack Park
	Pts: Aidan McCarthy (1-10, 8f); David Fitzgerald, Mark Rodgers, Tony Kelly (f) (0-2 each); Shane O’Donnell, Seadna Morey (0-1 each)	Report	Pts: Aaron Gillane (1-5, 5f); Donnacha Ó Dalaigh (1-1); Gearoid Hegarty (0-3); Diarmaid Byrnes (1-0f); Cathal O’Neill, David Reidy (0-2 each); Kyle Hayes, Cian Lynch (0-1 each)	Referee: C Lyons (Cork); Attendance: 20,055; TV: RTÉ2

28 April 2024 Round 2	Cork	3-24 (33) – (35) 3-26	Clare	Cork
14:00		(HT: 0-14 - 0-12)		Venue: Páirc Uí Chaoimh
	Pts: Patrick Horgan 2-10 (1-7fs, 2 65s), Declan Dalton 0-4 (3fs), Séamus Harnedy 0-3, Robert Downey 1-0, Darragh Fitzgibbon, Alan Connolly 0-2, Tim O’Mahony, Ciarán Joyce, Shane Kingston 0-1 each	Report	Pts: Aidan McCarthy 0-10 (8fs), Mark Rodgers 1-6 (1f, 1 sideline), David Fitzgerald, Shane O’Donnell 1-1 each, David Reidy 0-3, Peter Duggan, Diarmuid Ryan 0-2 each, David McInerney 0-1	Referee: J Owens (Wexford); Attendance: 36,841; TV: GAAGO

19 May 2024 Round 4	Clare	4-21 (33) – (32) 2-26	Waterford	Ennis
2pm		(HT: 2-13 - 0-14)		Venue: Cusack Park
	Pts: David Fitzgerald, Mark Rodgers (1’65) (1-4 each); Aidan McCarthy (0-5, 4f); Darragh Lohan, Tony Kelly (1-0 each); Shane O’Donnell, Ian Galvin (0-2 each); David Reidy, Cathal Malone, Diarmuid Ryan, Peter Duggan (0-1 each)	Report	Pts: Dessie Hutchinson (0-6, 5f); Stephen Bennett, Shane Bennett (1-0 Pen) (1-2 each); Kevin Mahony (0-4); Jack Prendergast, Tadhg de Burca (1f), Padraig Fitzgerald (0-2 each); Kieran Bennett, Jamie Barron, Jack Fagan, Patrick Fitzgerald, Ian Kenny, Calum Lyons (0-1 each)	Referee: L Gordon (Galway); Attendance: 19,893; TV: RTÉ2

26 May 2024 Round 5	Tipperary	0-24 (24) – (27) 1-24	Clare	Thurles
16:00		(HT: 0-11 - 0-11)		Venue: Semple Stadium
	Pts: Jake Morris 0-11 (7fs), Seanie Kenneally 0-3, Ronan Maher 0-2 (1f), Eoghan Connolly and Gearoid O’Connor (2fs) 0-2 each, Barry Heffernan, Alan Tynan, Noel McGrath, and Bryan O’Mara 0-1 each	Report	Pts: Aidan McCarthy 0-9 (6fs), Diarmuid Ryan 1-1, David Fitzgerald 0-3, Mark Rodgers 0-3 (2fs), Shane O’Donnell and Tony Kelly 0-2 each, Darragh Lohan, Peter Duggan, David Reidy, Ian Galvin 0-1 each	Referee: J Murphy (Limerick); Attendance: 19,418; TV: RTÉ News (TV channel)

=== Munster Final ===
9 June 2024
4:30pm
Final

Limerick	1-26 (29) – (23) 1-20	Clare
Gearóid Hegarty 1-2; Diarmaid Byrnes (3f), Aaron Gillane (4f) 0-5 each; Tom Morrissey 0-4 (1f); Declan Hannon, Kyle Hayes, David Reidy, Shane O’Brien 0-2 each; Cathal O’Neill, Adam English 0-1 each	Report	Aidan McCarthy 0-8 (6f); Peter Duggan 1-1; David Fitzgerald 0-4; Tony Kelly 0-3; Mark Rodgers 0-2 (2f); Shane O’Donnell, Ian Galvin 0-1 each

Semple Stadium
Attendance: 45,148
Referee: C Lyons (Cork)
Man of the match: Gearóid Hegarty (Limerick)
- Limerick advanced to the All-Ireland semi-finals and Clare advanced to the All-Ireland quarter-finals

== 2024 All-Ireland Senior Hurling Championship ==
The 2024 All-Ireland Senior Hurling Championship was the 137th staging of the All-Ireland Senior Hurling Championship, the Gaelic Athletic Association's premier inter-county hurling tournament, since its establishment in 1887.

The All-Ireland final was played on 21 July at Croke Park in Dublin, between Clare and Cork. Clare won the game by 3–29 to 1–34 to claim their fifth title.

=== Results ===
22 June 2024 Quarter-Final	Clare	2-28 (34) – (22) 1-19	Wexford	Thurles
3:15pm		(HT: 0-15 - 1-10)		Venue: Semple Stadium
	Pts: Shane O’Donnell 1-4, Mark Rodgers 0-6f, Tony Kelly 0-6 (1f), Ian Galvin 1-1, David Reidy 0-3, David Fitzgerald 0-2, Diarmuid Ryan 0-2, Aron Shanagher 0-1, Conor Leen 0-1, Shane Meehan 0-1, Aidan McCarthy 0-1 (65)	Report	Pts: Lee Chin 1-6 (1-0 pen, 5fs), Conor Foley 0-3 (1 sideline), Rory O’Connor 0-2, Cian Byrne 0-2, Mark Fanning 0-1 (f), Conor McDonald 0-1, Conor Hearne 0-1, Cathal Dunbar 0-1, Kevin Foley 0-1, Séamus Casey 0-1	Referee: J Murphy (Limerick); Attendance: 30,509; TV: RTÉ One

6 July 2024 Semi-Final	Kilkenny	2-16 (22) – (24) 0-24	Clare	Dublin
3pm		(HT: 1-10 - 0-8)		Venue: Croke Park
	Pts: TJ Reid 0-7 (4fs, 1 65, 1 sideline), Billy Ryan 1-2, Eoin Cody 1-0, John Donnelly and Cian Kenny 0-2 each, David Blanchfield, Mikey Carey, and Paddy Deegan 0-1 each	Report	Pts: Aidan McCarthy 0-11 (9fs), David Reidy and Tony Kelly 0-3 each, Mark Rodgers and David Fitzgerald 0-2 each, Shane O’Donnell, Ian Galvin, and Peter Duggan 0-1 each	Referee: L Gordon (Galway); Attendance: 39,241; TV: RTÉ One / BBC NI

RTÉ 2
BBC Two

21 July 2024
15:30 IST (UTC+01:00)
Final

Report

Clare	3-29 (38) – (37) 1-34 (a.e.t.)	Cork
(HT: 1-12 – 1-12) (FT: 3-21 – 1-27)
Gls: A McCarthy 1, T Kelly 1, M Rodgers 1 Pts: A McCarthy 7 (3fs, 1 '65'), T Kelly 4, M Rodgers 3, D Ryan 3, D Fitzgerald 3, P Duggan 2 (1s/l), D Reidy 2, S O'Donnell 2, R Taylor 1, I Galvin 1, S Meehan 1		Gls: R Downey 1 Pts: P Horgan 12 (10fs), S Harnedy 4, T O'Mahony 4, M Coleman 3, B Hayes 2, S Barrett 2, D Fitzgibbon 2, S Kingston 2, E Downey 1, A Connolly 1, C Joyce 1, R O'Flynn 1

Croke Park, Dublin
Referee: Johnny Murphy (Limerick)
Attendance: 82,300

=== Summary ===
Cork had two points scored in the first minute and added another before Mark Rodgers scored for Clare in the fifth minute. In the 12th minute Rob Downey won the ball on his own 65 and got away from Peter Duggan on the left before firing the ball high to the net straight off his hurl to put Cork into a seven-point lead. In the 18th minute Shane O’Donnell won the ball out on the left before passing to Peter Duggan and retaining the ball again before passing to Aidan McCarthy who scored with a finish to the right corner of the net past the advancing goalkeeper. The scores were level at half-time on 1–12 each.

Clare got a second goal in the 40th minute when Mark Rodgers picked up a breaking ball before stepping inside Mark Coleman from the right and scoring with a low finish to the net. In the 52nd minute, Tony Kelly ran in on goal from the left before flicking the ball over Seán O'Donoghue’s head, touched it on the Hurley before flicking it past Patrick Collins into the right corner of the net to put Clare into a 3–15 to 1–18 lead. Clare were still leading by three with two minutes to go before Cork came back with Patrick Horgan sending the match to extra-time by scoring a free in the 76th minute.

=== Trophy presentation ===
Clare captain Tony Kelly accepted the Liam MacCarthy Cup from GAA president Jarlath Burns in the Hogan Stand and the team then did a victory lap around Croke Park with the trophy.

=== Reaction ===
Highlights of the final were shown on The Sunday Game programme which aired at 9:30pm that night on RTÉ2 and was presented by Jacqui Hurley with match analysis from Brendan Cummins, Jackie Tyrell, Ursula Jacob, Joe Canning, Shane Dowling, and Anthony Daly. On the man of the match award shortlist were Tony Kelly, Conor Leen and Rob Downey with Tony Kelly winning the award which was presented by GAA president Jarlath Burns at the post match Clare function at the Inter-Continental Hotel in Dublin.

The Observer's architecture critic Rowan Moore wrote in praise of hurling, though also suggested it was "unexportable" and, were this not so, then it would be "a global sport".

=== Homecoming ===
The Clare team arrived back in Ennis at 9pm on the day after the game on an open top bus. There was a reception held at Tim Smyth Park in Ennis with an attendance of over 35,000 people. They had previously visited Wolfe Tones GAA club grounds in Shannon, before going thru Clarecastle on the way to Ennis. The players and manager were introduced on stage by RTÉ's Marty Morrissey.
