= 2024 Fitzgibbon Cup =

Irish collegiate hurling tournament

- Dates: 17 January - 17 February 2024
- Teams: 12
- Sponsor: Electric Ireland
- Champions: Mary Immaculate College (3rd title); Colin O'Brien (captain); Jamie Wall (manager)
- Runners-up: University of Limerick; Darragh Lohan (captain); Brian Ryan (manager)

Tournament statistics
- Matches played: 19
- Goals scored: 57 (3 per match)
- Points scored: 658 (34.63 per match)
- Top scorer(s): Gearóid O'Connor (1-38)

The 2024 Fitzgibbon Cup was the 107th staging of the Fitzgibbon Cup since its establishment by the Gaelic Athletic Association in 1912. The draw for the group stage fixtures took place on 5 December 2023. The competition ran from 17 January to 17 February 2024.

University of Limerick were the defending champions.

The Fitzgibbon Cup final was played on 17 February 2024 at Tom Healy Park in Abbeydorney, between Mary Immaculate College and University of Limerick, in what was their second meeting in the final overall and a first meeting in eight years. Mary Immaculate College won the match by 2–14 to 1–15 to claim their third Fitzgibbon Cup title overall and a first title in seven years.

Gearóid O'Connor was the top scorer with 1-38.

== Group A ==
=== Group A table ===
Advance to knockout stage

Team	Matches				Score			Pts
Team	Pld	W	D	L	For	Against	Diff	Pts
Mary Immaculate College	2	2	0	0	57	42	15	4
University College Cork	2	1	0	1	53	41	12	2
Maynooth University	2	0	0	2	35	62	-27	0

=== Group A results ===
24 January 2024 Round 2	Mary Immaculate College	1-25 - 0-20	University College Cork	MICL Grounds
	Devon Ryan (0-9, 0-8 frees); S O’Brien (0-5); D McLaughlin (1-1); J Gillane (0-1 free), J Devaney, C O’Brien, S Meehan (0-2 each); Diarmuid Ryan, R Power (0-1 each).	Report	B Cunningham (0-7, 0-5 frees); B Hayes (0-4); W Buckley, R Cotter, B Keating (0-2 each); C McCarthy, R Downey, D Flynn (0-1 each).

29 January 2024 Round 1	Maynooth University	1-19 - 2-23	Mary Immaculate College	LOETB Centre of Excellence
	C Fogarty 1-12 (0-11 frees); É Cunneen, C Boran (0-1 free) 0-2 each; C Hackett, P Blanchfield, A Hickey 0-1 each.	Report	Devon Ryan 0-7 (0-5f, 0-1 ’65, 0-1 s/l); C O’Brien 1-3 (0-1 free); S Meehan 0-3; J Devaney 1-0; S O’Brien, D McLaughlin, Diarmuid Ryan, C Quinn 0-2 each; J Gillane (free), F McDonagh 0-1 each.

1 February 2024 Round 3	University College Cork	4-21 - 0-13	Maynooth University	Mardyke Grounds
	S Barrett (2-2, 0-1 free); P McGarry (0-5); D Flynn (0-4, 0-3 frees); B Hayes, F Coleman (1-1); W Buckley (0-3); B Cunningham (0-2, 0-1 free); C McCarthy, C O’Brien, B Keating (0-1 each).	Report	C Fogarty (0-7, 0-4 frees, 0-1 ‘65); C Drennan (0-4); C Hackett, P McDonald (0-1 each).

== Group B ==
=== Group B table ===
Advance to knockout stage

Team	Matches				Score			Pts
Team	Pld	W	D	L	For	Against	Diff	Pts
University of Limerick	2	2	0	0	70	29	41	4
TUS Midwest	2	1	0	1	55	58	-3	2
ATU Galway	2	0	0	2	35	73	-38	0

=== Group B results ===
17 January 2024 Round 1	ATU Galway	0-13 - 3-25	University of Limerick	Connacht GAA Air Dome
	C Molloy 0-7 (0-4f), J Cooney 0-4 (0-3f), C Folan 0-1, R Meehan 0-1.	Report	A English 1-4, G O’Connor 0-6 (0-5f), M Rodgers 1-2, I Byrne 1-0, M Fitzgerald 0-3, C Coughlan 0-3, B O’Grady 0-3, P O’Donovan 0-2, F O’Connor 0-1, C Hanley 0-1f.

24 January 2024 Round 2	University of Limerick	2-30 - 1-13	TUS Midwest	UL Grounds
	G O’Connor (0-10, 0-5 frees, 0-1 ‘65); S O’Hanlon (1-6); A O’Connor (0-5); I Byrne (1-0); C Coughlan, A English, P O’Donovan (0-2 each); B O’Grady, B O’Sullivan, C Galvin (0-1 each).	Report	K Shelly (0-8, 0-6 frees, 0-2 65s); K O’Kelly (1-0); N O’Farrell, E Connolly (0-2 each); P Donnellan, M Ryan (0-1 each).

31 January 2024 Round 3	TUS Midwest	5-24 - 3-13	ATU Galway	TUS Midwest Grounds
	K O’Kelly 3-2, G Browne 1-4, C O’Dwyer 0-7 (2 ‘65s), K Shelly 0-6 (4f), S Kenneally 1-0, N O’Farrell and G Ryan 0-2 each, E Connolly 0-1.	Report	J Cooney 2-3 (1-0 pen, 0-2f), C Molloy 1-5 (3f), J Downey 0-3, C Folan and D Shaughnessy 0-1 each.

== Group C ==
=== Group C table ===
Advance to knockout stage

Team	Matches				Score			Pts
Team	Pld	W	D	L	For	Against	Diff	Pts
SETU Waterford	2	2	0	0	32	22	10	4
MTU Cork	2	1	1	0	26	28	-2	3
DCU Dóchas Éireann	2	0	1	1	30	38	-8	1

=== Group C results ===
18 January 2024 Round 1	DCU Dóchas Éireann	0-13 - 1-18	SETU Waterford	DCU Sportsgrounds
	J Flanagan 0-6, S Bourke 0-4, C Clancy 0-2, F Fitzpatrick 0-1.	Report	R Halloran 0-6, Pádraig Fitzgerald 1-2, S Walsh 0-3, Patrick Fitzgerald 0-2, G Fives 0-2, B Power 0-1, W Beresford 0-1, J Foley 0-1.

25 January 2024 Round 2	SETU Waterford	0-11 - 0-09	MTU Cork	SETU Waterford Complex
	R Halloran 0-7 (7fs), S Walsh 0-3, T Barron 0-1.	Report	B Lynch (2fs), S Walsh 0-2 each, S Quirke (f), M Tobin (f), C Joyce (f), B Kehoe, R Walsh 0-1 each.

1 January 2024 Round 3	MTU Cork	1-14 - 0-17	DCU Dóchas Éireann	MTU Cork Campus
	B Lynch (0-7, 0-4 frees), B Kehoe (1-0), E Kenneally (0-2 frees), S Keoghan, C Joyce (free), S Walsh, J Mulcahy and M Tobin (0-1 each).	Report	J Flanagan (0-11, 0-7 frees, 0-2 65s), P Moylan (0-2), J Barrett, P Langton, F Fitzpatrick and C Clancy (0-1 each).

== Group D ==
=== Group D table ===
Advance to knockout stage

Team	Matches				Score			Pts
Team	Pld	W	D	L	For	Against	Diff	Pts
University of Galway	2	2	0	0	53	35	18	4
SETU Carlow	2	1	0	1	47	45	2	2
University College Dublin	2	0	0	2	34	54	-20	0

=== Group D Results ===
18 January 2024 Round 1	SETU Carlow	2-12 - 3-19	University of Galway	SETU Carlow Grounds
	T Keyes 1-2, E Cody 0-5, D O'Donovan 1-0, C Corcoran 0-1, G Lynch 0-1, A Dunphy 0-1, J Fogarty 0-1, C Nolan 0-1.	Report	N Collins 1-5, G Lee 0-5, C Molloy 1-1, C Mitchell 1-1, T Killeen 0-2, P Burke 0-1, L Leen 0-1, E Lawless 0-1, I McGlynn 0-1, A Connaire 0-1.

25 January 2024 Round 2	University of Galway	1-22 - 2-11	University College Dublin	Dangan Grounds
	N Collins 0-14, C Molloy 1-2, A Connaire 0-3, T Killeen 0-2, I McGlynn 0-1.	Report	E Guilfoyle 0-5, D Purcell 0-4, J Duggan 1-0, C McGuckian 1-0, E Purcell 0-1, M Twomey 0-1.

1 February 2024 Round 3	University College Dublin	2-11 - 4-17	SETU Carlow	Belfield Grounds
	D Purcell 1-3, E Guilfoyle 1-1 (0-1f), L Murphy 0-4 (3f), S Audsley, C McGuckin, L Connellan 0-1 each.	Report	E Cody 2-4 (1-3f), A Dunphy, T Keyes 1-2 each, C Nolan, J Nolan 0-3 each, J Buggy (f), K Moynihan, J Fogarty 0-1 each.

== Knockout stage ==
=== Quarter-finals ===
7 February 2024 Quarter-final	University of Limerick	1-21 - 1-16	University College Cork	UL Grounds
	G O’Connor 0-8 (0-6f), C English 0-4, M Rodgers 1-1, A O’Connor, B O’Grady, M Fitzgerald 0-2 each, P O’Donovan, C O’Meara 0-1 each.	Report	S Barrett 0-7 (0-5f, 0-1 penalty), R Downey, W Buckley 0-2 each, B Hayes, J Fitzpatrick, E Downey, D Stakelum, D Flynn (0-1f) 0-1 each.

7 February 2024 Quarter-final	University of Galway	4-24 - 1-13	MTU Cork	Dangan Grounds
	C Molloy 1-5, N Collins 1-5 (0-4f), G Lee 1-2, T Killeen 0-4, A Connaire 0-3, S Morgan 1-0, I McGlynn 0-1, L Leen 0-1, G Thomas 0-1, D Loftus 0-1, O Flannery 0-1.	[https://www.irishexaminer.com/sport/gaa/arid-41327047.html Report	B Lynch 0-4f, C Joyce 0-4 (0-3f), E Kenneally 1-1, S Walsh 0-2, E Murphy 0-1, B Kehoe 0-1, J Mulcahy 0-1.	Referee: J Murphy (Limerick)

7 February 2024 Quarter-final	SETU Waterford	1-19 - 1-13	SETU Carlow	SETU Waterford Arena
	Patrick Fitzgerald 1-4, Padraig Fitzgerald 0-6, R Halloran 0-5 (5fs), S Walsh 0-3, J Fitzgerald 0-1.	Report	C Nolan 0-7 (1f), E Cody 1-3 (3fs), J Buggy 0-2 (1f), J Nolan 0-1.

7 February 2024 Quarter-final	Mary Immaculate College	1-25 - 1-17	TUS Midwest	Mary I Grounds
	Devon Ryan (0-11, 9 frees); S Meehan (1-2); S O’Brien (0-4); C Quinn (0-3); PJ Fanning, C Hennessy (0-2 each); C O’Brien (0-1 free).	Report	K Shelly (0-9, 7 frees, 1 65); S Kenneally (1-2); G Browne (0-3, 1 free); C O’Dwyer, Jack Ryan, N O’Farrell (0-1 each).

=== Semi-finals ===
14 February 2024 Semi-final	Mary Immaculate College	2-18 - 2-12	SETU Waterford	Mallow GAA Complex
	S Meehan (1-3), D Cahill (1-0), S O’Brien and Devon Ryan (frees) (0-3 each), C Quinn (0-2), J Gillane, PJ Fanning, J Caesar, R Power, C Hennessy, C O’Brien and F McDonagh (0-1 each).	Report	R Halloran (0-7, 0-6 frees, 0-1 65), S Walsh (1-1), B Nolan (1-0 free), G Fives (0-2), P Fitzgerald (Kilrosssanty and T Barron (0-1 each).	Referee: C O'Regan (Ballyhea)

14 February 2024 Semi-final	University of Galway	0-20 - 1-18	University of Limerick	St Joseph's Doora-Barefield Grounds
	N Collins 0-9 (0-8 frees); G Thomas, C Molloy, L Collins 0-2 each; A Connaire, L Leen, C Walsh, T Kileen, G Lee 0-1 each.	Report	G O’Connor 0-6 (0-3f, 0-1 ’65); M Rodgers 1-3; C Coughlan, S O’Hanlon 0-2 each; C Galvin, D Hanniffy, A English, C O’Meara, K Sampson 0-1 each.

=== Final ===
17 February 2024 Final	Mary Immaculate College	2-14 - 1-15	University of Limerick	Tom Healy Park
	Devon Ryan (1-4, 3f), J Gillane (1-3f), C O’Brien (0-2, 1f), D Ryan (0-2), C Quinn, R Power, S Meehan (0-1).	Report	G O’Connor (1-8, 5fs, 1/s/l, 1’65), S O’Hanlon (0-2), A English, B O’Grady, C Coughlan, C O’Meara, I Byrne (0-1 each).	Referee: J Keenan (Wicklow)

== Statistics ==
=== Top scorers ===
Overall

Rank	Player	County	Tally	Total	Matches	Average
1	Gearóid O'Connor	University of Limerick	1-38	41	5	8.20
2	Devon Ryan	Mary Immaculate College	1-34	37	5	7.40
3	Niall Collins	University of Galway	2-33	39	4	9.75
4	Reuben Halloran	SETU Waterford	0-25	25	4	6.25
5	Kyle Shelly	TUS Midwest	0-23	23	4	9.75
6	Colm Fogarty	Maynooth University	1-19	22	2	11.00
7	Eoin Cody	SETU Carlow	3-12	21	3	7.00
8	Shane Meehan	Mary Immaculate College	2-11	17	5	3.40
9	Joe Flanagan	DCU Dóchas Éireann	0-17	17	2	8.50
10	Mark Rodgers	University of Limerick	3-06	15	5	3.00
10	Shane Barrett	UCC	2-09	15	3	5.00
10	Conor Molloy	ATU Galway	1-12	15	2	7.50

In a single game

Rank	Player	Club	Tally	Total	Opposition
1	Colm Fogarty	Maynooth University	1-12	15	Mary Immaculate College
2	Niall Collins	University of Galway	0-14	14	UCD
3	Kian O'Kelly	TUS Midwest	3-02	11	ATU Galway
3	Gearóid O'Connor	University of Limerick	1-08	11	Mary Immaculate College
3	Devon Ryan	Mary Immaculate College	0-11	11	TUS Midwest
3	Joe Flanagan	DCU Dóchas Éireann	0-11	11	MTU Cork
7	Eoin Cody	SETU Carlow	2-04	10	UCD
7	Gearóid O'Connor	University of Limerick	0-10	10	TUS Midwest
9	John Cooney	ATU Galway	2-03	9	TUS Midwest
9	Devon Ryan	Mary Immaculate College	0-09	9	UCC
9	Kyle Shelly	TUS Midwest	0-09	9	Mary Immaculate College
9	Niall Collins	University of Galway	0-09	9	University of Limerick

== Awards ==
The Rising Stars Hurling Team of the Year was sponsored by Electric Ireland and was announced on 19 March 2024.

Team of the Year

Pos.	Player	Team
GK	Jason Gillane	Mary Immaculate College
RCB	Adam Hogan	Mary Immaculate College
FB	Eoin Lawless	University of Galway
LCB	Fergal O'Connor	University of Limerick
RWB	Diarmuid Ryan	Mary Immaculate College
CB	Mark Fitzgerald	University of Limerick
LWB	Joe Caesar	Mary Immaculate College
MD	Cathal Quinn	Mary Immaculate College
MD	Gavin Lee	University of Limerick
RWF	Reuben Halloran	SETU Waterford
CF	Gearóid O'Connor	University of Limerick
LWF	Shane O'Brien	Mary Immaculate College
RCF	Shane Meehan	Mary Immaculate College
FF	Mark Rodgers	University of Limerick
LCF	Niall Collins	University of Galway
