= 2024 All-Ireland Senior Hurling Championship final =

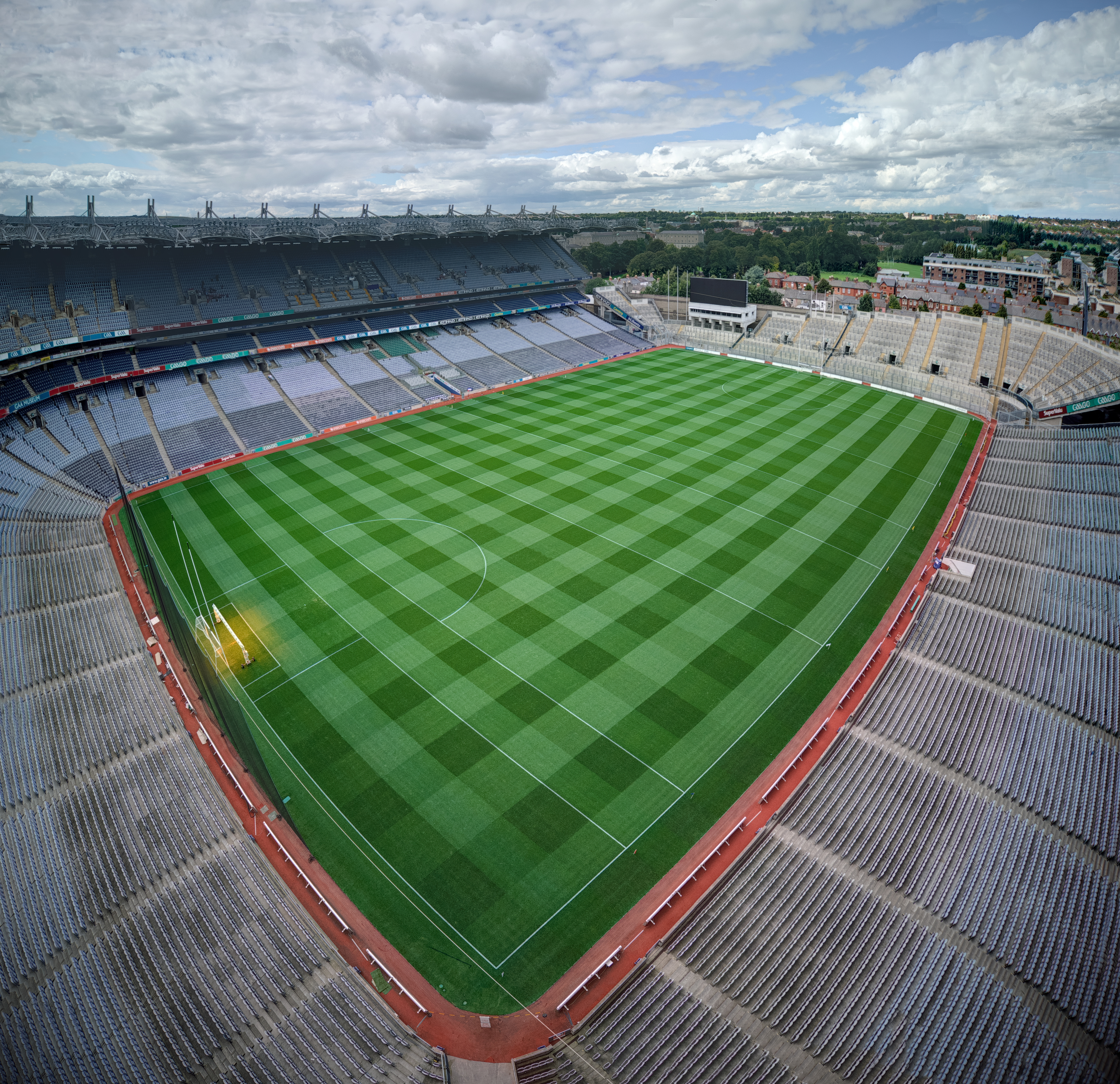
- Event: 2024 All-Ireland Senior Hurling Championship
| Clare | Cork |
| 3–29 (38) | 1–34 (37) |
- Clare win after extra time
- Date: 21 July 2024
- Venue: Croke Park, Dublin
- Man of the Match: Tony Kelly
- Referee: Johnny Murphy (Limerick)
- Attendance: 82,300
- Weather: 16 °C (61 °F), fair

The 2024 All-Ireland Senior Hurling Championship final was a hurling match played at Croke Park in Dublin on 21 July 2024 between Clare and Cork, the culmination of the 2024 All-Ireland Senior Hurling Championship. It was the 137th final of that sport's primary competition, the All-Ireland Senior Hurling Championship.

Clare won the game after extra-time by 3–29 to 1–34, to claim their fifth All-Ireland title.

The match was televised nationally on RTÉ2 as part of The Sunday Game live programme, presented by Joanne Cantwell from the Croke Park studio with analysis by Anthony Daly, Dónal Óg Cusack and Liam Sheedy. Commentary on the game was provided by Marty Morrissey alongside Michael Duignan.

The game was also televised on BBC Two for the first time and internationally on GAAGO. The BBC covered the final for the 2nd year in a row as part of The Championship presented this year for the first time by Sarah Mulkerrins alongside hurlers Neill McManus and Paul Murphy. Mark Sidebottom provides pitchside updates, with commentary by Thomas Niblock and Jamesie O’Connor.

The match was watched by over a million viewers in Ireland, an average of 1,037,000 watched live on RTÉ2, with another 9,000 watching on RTÉ2+1.

== Background ==
- Clare made their eighth final appearance, and their first since winning in 2013. They also won in the finals of 1914, 1995 and 1997, and were beaten finalists in 1889, 1932 and 2002.
- Cork were aiming to win their first title since 2005; they are the second most successful county in the championship's history, with 30 wins; their current streak of 18 consecutive seasons without an All-Ireland was the longest in their history.
- The two teams had met in the final once before, in 2013, with Clare winning after a replay.
- The fifth final to involve two Munster teams, after 1997 (Clare beat Tipperary), 2013 (Clare beat Cork), 2020 (Limerick beat Waterford) and 2021 (Limerick beat Cork).
- This was the fourth final to involve neither the Munster nor the Leinster champions (in 2024, Limerick and Kilkenny). The previous occasions were:
  - 2004 (Cork beat Kilkenny; Waterford and Wexford were provincial champions)
  - 2013 (Clare beat Cork; Dublin and Limerick were provincial champions)
  - 2019 (Tipperary beat Kilkenny; Wexford and Limerick were provincial champions)

== Paths to the final ==
Clare
| Round | Date | Opponent | Venue (H/A/N) | Result | Victory margin | Score | Ref |
|---|---|---|---|---|---|---|---|
| Munster SHC round robin | 21 April 2024 | Limerick | Cusack Park, Ennis (H) | Loss | –3 | 1–18 to 3–15 | |
| Munster SHC round robin | 28 April 2024 | Cork | Páirc Uí Chaoimh (A) | Win | 2 | 3–26 to 3–24 | |
| Munster SHC round robin | 19 May 2024 | Waterford | Cusack Park, Ennis (H) | Win | 1 | 4–21 to 2–26 | |
| Munster SHC round robin | 26 May 2024 | Tipperary | Semple Stadium (A) | Win | 3 | 1–24 to 0–24 | |
| Munster SHC final | 9 June 2024 | Limerick | Semple Stadium (N) | Loss | –6 | 1–20 to 1–26 | |
| All-Ireland SHC quarter-final | 22 June 2024 | Wexford | Semple Stadium (N) | Win | 12 | 2–28 to 1–19 | |
| All-Ireland SHC semi-final | 6 July 2024 | Kilkenny | Croke Park (N) | Win | 2 | 0–24 to 2–16 | |

Cork
| Round | Date | Opponent | Venue (H/A/N) | Result | Victory margin | Score | Ref |
|---|---|---|---|---|---|---|---|
| Munster SHC round robin | 21 April 2024 | Waterford | Walsh Park (A) | Loss | –3 | 1–25 to 2–25 | |
| Munster SHC round robin | 28 April 2024 | Clare | Páirc Uí Chaoimh (H) | Loss | –2 | 3–24 to 3–26 | |
| Munster SHC round robin | 11 May 2024 | Limerick | Páirc Uí Chaoimh (H) | Win | 2 | 3–28 to 3–26 | |
| Munster SHC round robin | 19 May 2024 | Tipperary | Semple Stadium (A) | Win | 18 | 4–30 to 1–21 | |
| All-Ireland SHC preliminary quarter-final | 15 June 2024 | Offaly | O'Connor Park (A) | Win | 9 | 4–25 to 3–19 | |
| All-Ireland SHC quarter-final | 22 June 2024 | Dublin | Semple Stadium (N) | Win | 5 | 0–26 to 0–21 | |
| All-Ireland SHC semi-final | 7 July 2024 | Limerick | Croke Park (N) | Win | 2 | 1–28 to 0–29 | |

== Pre-match ==
=== Officials ===
On 11 July, the GAA named Limerick's Johnny Murphy as the referee for the final, his first All-Ireland final. He previously refereed the 2018 All-Ireland minor final, the 2021 All-Ireland Under-20 final, the 2021 Leinster hurling final and the All-Ireland senior club final in 2023. Galway's Liam Gordon and Tipperary's Michael Kennedy served as linesmen for the final.

=== Jubilee teams ===
The Cork team that won the 1999 All-Ireland final was presented to the crowd before the match, on the silver jubilee.

=== Build-up ===
Tickets for the final were sold out with no general sales, over 32,000 tickets had been issued to Cork and Clare for distribution between the clubs. Cork had a total of 219 active GAA clubs, most of any county in Ireland, with 84 clubs in Clare. Stand tickets for the final cost €100 with terrace tickets at €55.

In Cork the match was shown at the Rebels' Fanzone free event at SuperValu Páirc Uí Chaoimh with 15,000 tickets sold out within 45 minutes. Clare County Council also screened the final on a big screen at a free event in Tim Smythe Park in Ennis.

=== Team news ===
On 18 July, Cork announced the same team for the final that started the semi-final against Limerick. Three players remained from the side that lost the 2013 replay to Clare, with Séamus Harnedy and Patrick Horgan starting and Conor Lehane on the bench. A day later, Clare also announced the same starting team as against Kilkenny in the semi-final. Four players, John Conlon, David McInerney, Tony Kelly and Shane O'Donnell remained from the side that won the final in 2013.

== Match ==
=== Summary ===
Cork had two points scored in the first minute and added another before Mark Rodgers scored for Clare in the fifth minute. In the 12th minute Rob Downey won the ball on his own 65 and got away from Peter Duggan on the left before firing the ball high to the net straight off his hurl to put Cork into a seven point lead. In the 18th minute Shane O’Donnell won the ball out on the left before passing to Peter Duggan and retaining the ball again before passing to Aidan McCarthy who scored with a finish to the right corner of the net past the advancing goalkeeper. The scores were level at half-time on 1–12 each.

Clare got a second goal in the 40th minute when Mark Rodgers picked up a breaking ball before stepping inside Mark Coleman from the right and scoring with a low finish to the net. In the 52nd minute, Tony Kelly ran in on goal from the left before flicking the ball over Seán O'Donoghue’s head, touched it on the Hurley before flicking it past Patrick Collins into the right corner of the net to put Clare into a 3–15 to 1–18 lead. Clare were still leading by three with two minutes to go before Cork came back with Patrick Horgan sending the match to extra-time by scoring a free in the 76th minute.

=== Details ===
RTÉ 2
BBC Two

21 July 2024
15:30 IST (UTC+01:00)
Final

Report

| Clare | 3–29 (38) – (37) 1–34 (a.e.t.) | Cork |
|---|---|---|
(HT: 1–12 – 1–12) (FT: 3–21 – 1–27)
| Gls: A McCarthy 1, T Kelly 1, M Rodgers 1 Pts: A McCarthy 7 (3fs, 1 '65'), T Kelly 4, M Rodgers 3, D Ryan 3, D Fitzgerald 3, P Duggan 2 (1s/l), D Reidy 2, S O'Donnell 2, R Taylor 1, I Galvin 1, S Meehan 1 | | Gls: R Downey 1 Pts: P Horgan 12 (10fs), S Harnedy 4, T O'Mahony 4, M Coleman 3, B Hayes 2, S Barrett 2, D Fitzgibbon 2, S Kingston 2, E Downey 1, A Connolly 1, C Joyce 1, R O'Flynn 1 |

Croke Park, Dublin
Referee: Johnny Murphy (Limerick)
Attendance: 82,300
Standby: Liam Gordon (Galway)
Linesman: Michael Kennedy (Tipperary)
Sideline: Chris Mooney (Dublin)
Umpires: Michael Meade, James Hickey, Jimmy Barry Murphy (all Ballylanders), Andy Dooley (Garryspillane)

| Clare | Cork |

| GK | 1 | Eibhear Quilligan |
| FB | 2 | Adam Hogan | (yellow card) 28' |
| FB | 3 | Conor Cleary | (yellow card) 23' | (substituted off) 70+1' |
| FB | 4 | Conor Leen |
| HB | 5 | Diarmuid Ryan | | (substituted off) 80' |
| HB | 6 | John Conlon |
| HB | 7 | David McInerney |
| MF | 8 | David Fitzgerald |
| MF | 9 | Cathal Malone |
| HF | 10 | Tony Kelly (c) |
| HF | 11 | Mark Rodgers |
| HF | 12 | Peter Duggan | | (substituted off) 65' |
| FF | 13 | Aidan McCarthy | | (substituted off) 55' |
| FF | 14 | Shane O'Donnell | | (substituted off) 80' |
| FF | 15 | David Reidy | | (substituted off) 59' |
Substitutes:
| | 16 | Cian Broderick |
| | 17 | Rory Hayes |
| | 18 | Paul Flanagan |
| | 19 | Cian Galvin | | (substituted on) 80' |
| | 20 | Darragh Lohan | | (substituted on) 70+1' |
| | 21 | Ryan Taylor | | (substituted on) 55' |
| | 22 | Séadna Morey |
| | 23 | Aron Shanagher | | (substituted on) 65' |
| | 24 | Ian Galvin | | (substituted on) 59' |
| | 25 | Shane Meehan | | (substituted on) 80' |
| | 26 | Robin Mounsey |
Manager:
Brian Lohan

| GK | 1 | Patrick Collins |
| FB | 2 | Niall O'Leary |
| FB | 3 | Eoin Downey |
| FB | 4 | Seán O'Donoghue (c) | (substituted off) 80' |
| HB | 5 | Ciarán Joyce |
| HB | 6 | Robert Downey |
| HB | 7 | Mark Coleman |
| MF | 8 | Tim O'Mahony | (substituted off) 85' |
| MF | 9 | Darragh Fitzgibbon |
| HF | 10 | Declan Dalton | (substituted off) 48' |
| HF | 11 | Shane Barrett | (substituted off) 66' |
| HF | 12 | Séamus Harnedy | (substituted off) 67' |
| FF | 13 | Patrick Horgan |
| FF | 14 | Alan Connolly | (substituted off) 63' |
| FF | 15 | Brian Hayes |
Substitutes:
| | 16 | Bríon Saunderson |
| | 17 | Damien Cahalane |
| | 18 | Ger Millerick | (substituted on) 80' |
| | 19 | Tommy O'Connell |
| | 20 | Luke Meade | (substituted on) 85' |
| | 21 | Ethan Twomey | (substituted on) 48' |
| | 22 | Conor Lehane |
| | 23 | Jack O'Connor | (substituted on) 63' |
| | 24 | Shane Kingston | (substituted on) 66' |
| | 25 | Pádraig Power |
| | 26 | Robbie O'Flynn | (substituted on) 67' |
Manager:
Pat Ryan

=== Trophy presentation ===
Clare captain Tony Kelly accepted the Liam MacCarthy Cup from GAA president Jarlath Burns in the Hogan Stand and the team then did a victory lap around Croke Park with the trophy.

=== Reaction ===
Highlights of the final were shown on The Sunday Game programme which aired at 9:30pm that night on RTÉ2 and was presented by Jacqui Hurley with match analysis from Brendan Cummins, Jackie Tyrell, Ursula Jacob, Joe Canning, Shane Dowling, and Anthony Daly. On the man of the match award shortlist were Tony Kelly, Conor Leen and Rob Downey with Tony Kelly winning the award which was presented by GAA president Jarlath Burns at the post match Clare function at the Inter-Continental Hotel in Dublin.

The Observer's architecture critic Rowan Moore wrote in praise of hurling, though also suggested it was "unexportable" and, were this not so, then it would be "a global sport".

=== Homecoming ===
The Clare team arrived back in Ennis at 9pm on the day after the game on an open top bus. There was a reception held at Tim Smyth Park in Ennis with an attendance of over 35,000 people. They had previously visited Wolfe Tones GAA club grounds in Shannon, before going thru Clarecastle on the way to Ennis. The players and manager were introduced on stage by RTÉ's Marty Morrissey.
