= Éibhear Quilligan =

Irish hurler

Eibhear Quilligan
Personal information
- Native name: Eibhear Ó Cuileagáin (Irish)
- Born: 1994 (age 31–32) Feakle, County Clare, Ireland
- Occupation: Business development manager

Sport
- Sport: Hurling
- Position: Goalkeeper
Club
- Years: Club
- Feakle
Club titles
- Clare titles: 1
College
- Years: College
- 2013-2017: Limerick Institute of Technology
College titles
- Fitzgibbon titles: 0
Inter-county*
| Years | County | Apps (scores) |
| 2020-present | Clare | 5 (0-00) |
Inter-county titles
- Munster titles: 0
- All-Irelands: 1
- NHL: 1
- All Stars: 0
- *Inter County team apps and scores correct as of 14:50, 2 July 2021.

Eibhear Quilligan (born 1994) is an Irish hurler who plays for Clare Championship club Feakle and at inter-county level with the Clare senior hurling team. He typically starts as the goalkeeper.

== Career ==
A member of the Feakle club, Quilligan first came to hurling prominence with St. Flannan's College in the Harty Cup. He later lined out with the Limerick Institute of Technology in the Fitzgibbon Cup. Quilligan first appeared on the inter-county scene as a member of the Clare minor team that won the 2011 Munster Championship. He subsequently lined out with the Clare under-21 team and was sub-goalkeeper when the team won the All-Ireland Under-21 Championship in 2014. Quilligan made his debut with the Clare senior hurling team during the 2020 league.

On 21 July 2024, he started as Clare won the All-Ireland for the first time in 11 years after an extra-time win against Cork by 3–29 to 1-34, claiming their fifth All-Ireland title.

== Career statistics ==
As of match played 27 June 2021.

| Team | Year | National League | | | Munster | | All-Ireland | | Total | |
| Team | Year | Division | Apps | Score | Apps | Score | Apps | Score | Apps | Score |
|---|---|---|---|---|---|---|---|---|---|---|
| Clare | 2020 | Division 1B | 3 | 0-00 | 1 | 0-00 | 3 | 0-00 | 7 | 0-00 |
| Clare | 2021 | Division 1B | 5 | 0-00 | 1 | 0-00 | 0 | 0-00 | 6 | 0-00 |
| Career total | | | 8 | 0-00 | 2 | 0-00 | 3 | 0-00 | 13 | 0-00 |

== Honours ==
Clare

- All-Ireland Senior Hurling Championship: 2024
- National Hurling League: 2024
- All-Ireland Under-21 Hurling Championship: 2014
- Munster Under-21 Hurling Championship: 2014
- Munster Minor Hurling Championship: 2011

Feakle

- Clare Senior Hurling Championship: 2024
