= Aidan McCarthy =

Irish hurler and gaelic footballer

Personal information
- Native name: Aodán Mac Cárthaigh (Irish)
- Born: 2000 (age 25–26) Kilnamona, County Clare, Ireland
- Occupation: Student
- Height: 6 ft 0 in (183 cm)

Sport
- Sport: Hurling
- Position: Left corner-forward
Club
- Years: Club
- Inagh-Kilnamona Kilmurry Ibrickane
Club titles
- Clare titles: 0
Inter-county*
Years	County	Apps (scores)
2019-present	Clare	26 (5-108)
Inter-county titles
- Munster titles: 0
- All-Irelands: 1
- NHL: 1
- All Stars: 0
- *Inter County team apps and scores correct as of match played 27 April 2025.

Aidan McCarthy (born 2000) is an Irish hurler who plays as a forward for Clare Championship club Inagh-Kilnamona and Clare Championship club Kilmurry Ibrickane and at inter-county level with the Clare senior hurling team.

On 21 July 2024, he started in the full-forward line as Clare won the All-Ireland for the first time in 11 years after an extra-time win against Cork by 3–29 to 1-34, claiming their fifth All-Ireland title.

== Career statistics ==
As of match played 27 April 2025

Team	Year	National League			Munster		All-Ireland		Total	
Team	Year	Division	Apps	Score	Apps	Score	Apps	Score	Apps	Score
Clare	2019	Division 1A	5	0-01	4	0-03	—		9	0-04
Clare	2020	Division 1B	4	0-03	1	0-00	3	1-01	8	1-04
Clare	2021	Division 1B	5	1-29	2	0-04	2	0-05	9	1-38
Clare	2022	Division 1A	0	0-00	0	0-00	0	0-00	0	0-00
Clare	2023	Division 1A	5	2-51	4	1-27	0	0-00	9	3-78
Clare	2024	Division 1A	6	2-36	5	1-42	3	1-19	14	4-97
Clare	2025	Division 1A			2	1-07			2	1-07
Career total			25	5-120	18	3-83	8	2-25	51	10-228

== Honours ==
Inagh-Kilnamona

- Clare Senior Hurling Championship: 2026
- Clare Under-21 Hurling Championship: 2019

Clare

- All-Ireland Senior Hurling Championship (1): 2024
- National Hurling League (1): 2024
- Munster Senior Hurling League (1): 2019
