= Shane Meehan =

Irish hurler

Personal information
- Native name: Seán Ó Miacháin (Irish)
- Born: 2002 (age 23–24) Ennis, County Clare, Ireland
- Occupation: Student

Sport
- Sport: Hurling
- Position: Left corner-forward
Club
- Years: Club
- Banner
Club titles
- Clare titles: 0
College
- Years: College
- Mary Immaculate College
College titles
- Fitzgibbon titles: 0
Inter-county*
Years	County	Apps (scores)
2021-present	Clare	0 (0-00)
Inter-county titles
- Munster titles: 0
- All-Irelands: 1
- NHL: 0
- All Stars: 0
- *Inter County team apps and scores correct as of 12:52, 19 February 2022.

Shane Meehan (born 2002) is an Irish hurler who plays for Clare Senior Championship club Banner GAA and at inter-county level with the Clare senior hurling team.

== Career ==
A member of the Banner club in Ennis, Meehan first came to prominence as a dual player at juvenile and underage levels and as a schoolboy with Rice College. He made his first appearance on the inter-county scene as a dual player with the Clare minor teams in 2018. Meehan captained the minor footballers the following season and was the minor hurling team's top scorer. He ended the 2019 season as Munster Minor Footballer of the Year, while he was also named on the Minor Hurling Team of the Year. Meehan subsequently progressed to under-20 level where he continued as a dual player. He joined the Clare senior hurling team in 2021.

On 21 July 2024, he came on as a substitute as Clare won the All-Ireland for the first time in 11 years after an extra-time win against Cork by 3–29 to 1-34, claiming their fifth All-Ireland title.

== Career statistics ==
As of 13 February 2022.

Team	Year	National League			Munster		All-Ireland		Total	
Team	Year	Division	Apps	Score	Apps	Score	Apps	Score	Apps	Score
Clare	2021	Division 1B	1	0-01	0	0-00	0	0-00	1	0-01
Clare	2022	Division 1B	2	1-01	0	0-00	0	0-00	2	1-01
Career total			3	1-02	0	0-00	0	0-00	3	1-02

== Honours ==
Mary Immaculate College

- Fitzgibbon Cup: 2024

Clare

- All-Ireland Senior Hurling Championship: 2024

Awards

- Munster Minor Football of the Year: 2019
- GAA Minor Star Hurling Team of the Year Award: 2019
