= Conor Leen =

Irish hurler

Personal information
- Native name: Conchúr Ó Laighin (Irish)
- Born: 2002 (age 23–24) Corofin, County Clare, Ireland

Sport
- Sport: Hurling
- Position: Left corner-back number 4
Club
- Years: Club
- 2020-present: Corofin
Club titles
- Clare titles: 0
- All-Ireland Titles: 0
Inter-county*
Years	County	Apps (scores)
2024-	Clare	6 (0-01)
Inter-county titles
- Munster titles: 0
- All-Irelands: 1
- NHL: 1
- All Stars: 0
- *Inter County team apps and scores correct as of 18:33, 6 July 2024.

Conor Leen (born 2002) is an Irish hurler. At club level he plays with Corofin and at inter-county level with the Clare senior hurling team with whom he won an All-Ireland Senior Hurling medal after extra time in a one-point victory vs Cork on 21 July 2024, final score 3.29 to 1.34.

== Career ==
Leen played schools hurling while a student at Ennistymon CBS. At club level, he played in the various underage grades with the Corofin/Ruan amalgamation and won consecutive Clare MAHC titles in 2019 and 2020, as well as a Clare U21AHC title in 2021. Leen progressed to adult level and won a Clare IHC medal in 2023.

Leen first appeared on the inter-county scene with Clare as a member of the minor team beaten by Limerick in the 2019 Munster MHC final. He later spent two seasons with the under-20 team. Leen made his senior team debut during Clare's National Hurling League-winning campaign in 2024. On 21 July 2024 he started and won his first Senior All-Ireland Hurling medal in an epic 3.29 to 1.34 aet victory vs Cork. He lined out at left-corner back, number 4 and played the entire game. Conor was also picked at number 4 on The Sunday Game Team of the Year. His father, Edward, is a former Kerry hurler and his mother Barbara comes from Clare / Connemara. His grandfather, Donal (the Butch) and two granduncles, Eamonn and Mike (the Black), also played senior hurling with Kerry. Conor was also included in the nominations for an All-Star in 2024.

On 21 July 2024, he started at corner back as Clare won the All-Ireland for the first time in 11 years after an extra-time win against Cork by 3–29 to 1-34, claiming their fifth All-Ireland title.

== Honours ==
Corofin/Ruan

- Clare Under-21 Hurling Championship: 2021
- Clare Minor A Hurling Championship: 2019, 2020

Corofin

- Clare Intermediate Hurling Championship: 2023

Clare

- All-Ireland Senior Hurling Championship: 2024
- National Hurling League: 2024

Awards

- The Sunday Game Team of the Year: 2024

All-Star Nominee 2024.
