= Adam Hogan =

Irish hurler

Personal information
- Born: 2003 (age 22–23) Feakle, County Clare, Ireland
- Occupation: Student

Sport
- Sport: Hurling
- Position: Right corner-back
Club
- Years: Club
- Feakle
Club titles
- Clare titles: 1
Inter-county
- Years: County
- 2022-present: Clare
Inter-county titles
- Munster titles: 0
- All-Irelands: 1
- NHL: 1
- All Stars: 1

Adam Hogan (born 2003) is an Irish hurler and All Ireland Winner. At club level he plays with Feakle, while he has also lined out at inter-county level with various Clare teams.

== Career ==
Hogan first played hurling with the Feakle-Killanena underage amalgamation. He enjoyed some success as a juvenile, winning the Clare U14HC title in 2017, before losing the Clare MAHC final in 2020. Hogan also played as a schoolboy with St Joseph's Secondary School in Tulla and won a Harty Cup medal in 2022.

Hogan first appeared on the inter-county scene with Clare during a two-year tenure with the minor team in 2019 and 2020. He served as captain during his second year on the team. Hogan later spent two seasons with the under-20 team and was team captain in 2023, however, he missed Clare's Munster final defeat by Cork that year. He has been a part of the senior team since 2022 and made his championship debut in 2023.

On 21 July 2024, he started at corner back as Clare won the All-Ireland for the first time in 11 years after an extra-time win against Cork by 3–29 to 1–34, claiming their fifth All-Ireland title.

Hogan won an All Star and was selected as GAA/GPA Young Hurler of the Year at the end of the 2024 season.

== Honours ==
St Joseph's Secondary School

- Harty Cup: 2022

Mary Immaculate College

- Fitzgibbon Cup: 2024

Feakle

- Clare Senior Hurling Championship: 2024
- Clare Under-14 A Hurling Championship: 2017
- Clare Under-21 A Hurling Championship: 2023

Clare

- All-Ireland Senior Hurling Championship: 2024
- National Hurling League: 2024

Awards

- The Sunday Game Team of the Year: 2024
- All Star (1): 2024
- GAA/GPA Young Hurler of the Year (1): 2024
