= Tony Kelly (hurler) =

Irish hurler (born 1993)

Personal information
- Native name: Antaine Ó Ceallaigh (Irish)
- Nickname: TK
- Born: 15 December 1993 (age 32) Ballyea, County Clare, Ireland
- Height: 1.82 m (6 ft 0 in)

Sport
- Sport: Hurling
- Position: Midfield/Centre Forward
Clubs
- Years: Club
- Ballyea; Clondegad
Club titles
- Clare titles: 4
- Munster titles: 1
College
- Years: College
- 2012-2018: University of Limerick
College titles
- Fitzgibbon titles: 2
Inter-county*
Years	County	Apps (scores)
2012-present	Clare	68 (18-343)
Inter-county titles
- Munster titles: 0
- All-Irelands: 2
- NHL: 2
- All Stars: 5
- *Inter County team apps and scores correct as of 17:16, 06 November 2025.

Tony Kelly (Irish: Antaine Ó Ceallaigh) (born 15 December 1993) is an Irish hurler who plays for Clare Senior Championship club Ballyea and at inter-county level with the Clare county hurling team. He is the youngest hurler to win Hurler of the Year during 2013 at age 19, when he also won Young Hurler of the Year and the All-Ireland Senior Hurling Championship. Known for his skill, pace and athleticism, Tony Kelly is widely regarded to be the greatest Clare hurler of all time.

== Early life ==
Kelly attended St Flannan's College in Ennis for his secondary education and as of 2021 works in the school as a Business teacher as well as coaching the senior hurling team.

== Playing career ==
=== Clare ===
==== Minor and under-21 ====
Kelly first came to prominence on the inter-county scene as a member of the Clare minor team in 2010. He won his first Munster medal that year following a 1–16 to 1–11 defeat of Waterford. Clare subsequently qualified for the All-Ireland decider against Kilkenny, however, Kelly's side faced a narrow 2–10 to 0–14 defeat.

In 2011 Kelly was appointed captain of the Clare minor team. He won a second consecutive Munster medal that year following a 1–20 to 3–9 defeat of Waterford once again. The subsequent All-Ireland semi final saw Clare defeated by Galway after extra time.

Kelly also became a member of the Clare under-21 team in 2011, however they were defeated in the Munster Semi-final by Limerick on a scoreline of 2–19 to 1-15 despite a contribution of 3 points from play from Tony Kelly. This remains Kelly's only defeat in the Munster Minor and Under-21 Championships. Kelly won his first Munster medal in that grade as Clare defeated Tipperary by 1–16 to 1–14 in the 2012 Munster Final in Cusack Park in Ennis. After trailing at half-time, Clare outscored Kilkenny by 1–10 to 0–4 in the second period of play to secure a 2–17 to 2–11 victory in the All-Ireland final of the same year. It was Kelly's first All-Ireland medal in the grade.

Clare dominated the under-21 series once again in 2013. A 1–17 to 2–10 defeat of Tipperary in the provincial decider gave Kelly a second Munster medal. The subsequent All-Ireland saw Clare face first-time finalists Antrim. In a complete mismatch, Clare powered to a 2–28 to 0–12 victory, with Kelly collecting a second consecutive All-Ireland medal.

==== Senior ====
Kelly made his senior championship debut at left wing-forward and scoring 1–2 in a 1–16 to 0–16 defeat of Dublin on 7 July 2012.

On 8 September 2013 Kelly lined out against Cork in his first All-Ireland final. Three second-half goals through Conor Lehane, Anthony Nash and Pa Cronin, and a tenth point of the game from Patrick Horgan gave Cork a one-point lead as injury time came to an end. A last-gasp point from corner-back Domhnall O'Donovan earned Clare a 0–25 to 3–16 draw. The replay on 28 September was regarded as one of the best in recent years. Clare's Shane O'Donnell was a late addition to the team, and went on to score a hat-trick of goals in the first nineteen minutes of the game. Horgan top scored for Cork, however, further goals from Conor McGrath and Darach Honan secured a 5–16 to 3–16 victory for Clare. It was Kelly's first All-Ireland medal. He rounded off the season by collecting his first All-Star award, while also becoming the only player in the history of the scheme to have won the Hurler and Young Hurler of the Year awards in the same year.

In June 2014, Kelly featured in the Sky Sports television advert to promote their new broadcasting deal with the GAA.

On 8 May 2016, Clare won the 2016 National Hurling League, their first National Hurling League title since 1978 after a 1–23 to 2–19 win against Waterford in a replay. Kelly scored 1–6 in the game, including two late points to win the game.

On 25 October 2020, Kelly scored 17 points in the first game of the delayed Munster Championship against Limerick, in a game that Clare lost 1–23 to 0-36. On 7 November 2020, he scored 0–13 against Laois in round 1 of the qualifiers, and a week later scored 1–15 against Wexford in round 2.

On 21 July 2024, he was captain and scored 1–4 as Clare won the All-Ireland for the first time in 11 years after an extra-time win against Cork by 3–29 to 1-34, claiming their fifth All-Ireland title. Kelly won an All Star at the end of the 2024 season.

== Career statistics ==
As of match played 20 April 2025

Team	Year	National League			Munster		All-Ireland		Total	
Team	Year	Division	Apps	Score	Apps	Score	Apps	Score	Apps	Score
Clare	2012	Division 1B	0	0-00	0	0-00	2	2-04	2	2-04
Clare	2013	Division 1A	6	2-19	2	0-05	6	0-17	14	2-41
Clare	2014	Division 1A	7	0-21	1	0-01	2	0-07	10	0-29
Clare	2015	Division 1A	4	1-24	1	0-02	2	0-13	7	1-39
Clare	2016	Division 1B	3	1-11	1	0-01	3	0-26	7	1-38
Clare	2017	Division 1A	3	1-16	2	0-10	1	0-06	6	1-32
Clare	2018	Division 1A	5	0-14	5	1-17	3	0-09	13	1-40
Clare	2019	Division 1A	5	0-14	4	1-11	—		9	1-25
Clare	2020	Division 1A	6	0-68	1	0-17	3	1-36	10	1-121
Clare	2021	Division 1B	4	2-39	2	2-21	2	1-20	8	5-80
Clare	2022	Division 1A	3	3-32	4	1-46	2	0-08	9	4-86
Clare	2023	Division 1A	3	1-02	5	2-28	2	3-05	10	6-35
Clare	2024	Division 1A	—		4	1-07	3	1-13	7	2-20
Clare	2025	Division 1A	5	1-15	3	1-09	—		8	2-24
Total			54	12-275	35	9-175	31	8-164	120	29-614

== Honours ==
=== Team ===
University of Limerick

- Fitzgibbon Cup (2) : 2015, 2018

Clondegad

- Clare Under-21 A Football Championship (1) : 2012
- Clare Intermediate Football Championship (1) : 2011
- Clare Minor B Football Championship (1) : 2009

Ballyea

- Munster Senior Club Hurling Championship (1) : 2016
- Clare Senior Hurling Championship (4) : 2016, 2018 (c), 2021, 2022
- Clare Senior B Hurling Championship (1) : 2013
- Clare Under-21 A Hurling Championship (1): 2012
- Clare Under-21 B Hurling Championship (1): 2011
- Clare Minor B Hurling Championship (1) : 2009

Clare

- All-Ireland Senior Hurling Championship (2): 2013, 2024 (c)
- National Hurling League (2): 2016 (c), 2024 (c)
- Munster Senior Hurling League (2): 2016, 2019 (c)
- All-Ireland Under-21 Hurling Championship (3): 2012, 2013, 2014 (c)
- Munster Under-21 Hurling Championship (3): 2012, 2013, 2014 (c)
- Munster Minor Hurling Championship (2): 2010, 2011

=== Individual ===
Awards

- GAA-GPA Hurler of the Year (1): 2013
- GAA-GPA Young Hurler of the Year (1): 2013
- GAA-GPA All-Star Award (5): 2013, 2020, 2021, 2022, 2024
- The Sunday Game Player of the Year (1): 2013
- The Sunday Game Team of the Year (5): 2013, 2020, 2021, 2022, 2024
- All Ireland Hurling Final Man Of The Match (1): 2024
- Bord Gáis Under-21 All-Star (1) : 2013
- Munster Under-21 Hurler Of The Year (1) : 2012
- Munster Minor Player of the Year (1) : 2011

Achievements
Preceded by Paul Flanagan	All-Ireland Under-21 Hurling Final winning captain 2014	Succeeded by Diarmaid Byrnes
Awards
Preceded by Johnny Coen	All Stars Young Hurler of the Year; 2013	Succeeded by Cathal Barrett
Preceded by Henry Shefflin	All Stars Hurler of the Year; 2013	Succeeded by Richie Hogan
Sporting positions
Preceded by Paul Flanagan	Clare Under-21 Hurling Captain; 2014	Succeeded by Conor Cleary
Preceded by Patrick Donnellan; Cian Dillon	Clare Senior Hurling Joint-Captain; 2016	Succeeded by Patrick O'Connor
