= David Reidy (Clare hurler) =

Irish hurler

Personal information
- Native name: Daithí Ó Riada (Irish)
- Born: 1993 (age 32–33) Ennis, County Clare, Ireland
- Occupation: Student

Sport
- Sport: Hurling
- Position: Midfield
Club
- Years: Club
- Éire Óg
Club titles
- Clare titles: 0
College
- Years: College
- Limerick Institute of Technology
College titles
- Fitzgibbon titles: 0
Inter-county*
Years	County	Apps (scores)
2014-present	Clare	145(2-139)
Inter-county titles
- Munster titles: 0
- All-Irelands: 1
- NHL: 2
- All Stars: 0
- *Inter County team apps and scores correct as of 17:29, 24 July 2021.

David Reidy (born 1993) is an Irish hurler who plays as a midfielder for the Clare senior team.

Born in Ennis, County Clare, Reidy developed his hurling skills at St. Flannan's College while playing at underage levels with the Éire Óg club. Reidy subsequently became a member of the Éire Óg senior team.

Reidy made his début on the inter-county scene at the age of twenty when he first linked up with the Clare Under-21 team. He made his senior début during the 2014 league.

On 21 July 2024, he started in the full-forward line as Clare won the All-Ireland for the first time in 11 years after an extra-time win against Cork by 3–29 to 1-34, claiming their fifth All-Ireland title.

== Career statistics ==
As of match played 25 February 2018.

Team	Year	National League			Munster		All-Ireland		Total	
Team	Year	Division	Apps	Score	Apps	Score	Apps	Score	Apps	Score
Clare	2014	Division 1A	4	0-01	0	0-00	0	0-00	4	0-01
Clare	2015	Division 1A	5	0-04	1	0-01	2	0-00	8	0-05
Clare	2016	Division 1B	9	0-11	1	0-01	3	0-00	13	0-12
Clare	2017	Division 1A	5	0-29	2	0-05	1	0-02	8	0-36
Clare	2018	Division 1A	4	2-14	0	0-00	0	0-00	4	2-14
Total			27	2-59	4	0-07	6	0-02	37	2-68

== Honours ==
=== Team ===
Clare

- All-Ireland Senior Hurling Championship (1): 2024
- National Hurling League (2): 2016, 2024
