= Robin Mounsey =

Irish hurler (born 2001)

Personal information
- Born: 2001 (age 24–25) Ruan, County Clare, Ireland
- Occupation: Student

Sport
- Sport: Hurling
- Position: Right corner-forward
Clubs
- Years: Club
- Ruan; Corofin
Club titles
- Clare titles: 0
College
- Years: College
- 2019-present: TUS: Midlands Midwest
College titles
- Fitzgibbon titles: 0
Inter-county
- Years: County
- 2022-present: Clare
Inter-county titles
- Munster titles: 0
- All-Irelands: 0
- NHL: 0
- All Stars: 0

Robin Mounsey (born 2001) is an Irish hurler. At club he plays hurling with Ruan and Gaelic football with Corofin, while he has also lined out at inter-county level with various Clare teams.

== Career ==
Mounsey first played hurling to a high standard as a student at St. Flannan's College in Ennis. He lined out for the college in all grades, including the Harty Cup. He later played with the TUS: Midlands Midwest in the Fitzgibbon Cup.

At club level, Mounsey first played hurling at underage levels with the Corofin/Ruan amalgamation. He captained the amalgamation to the Clare MAHC title in 2019 after a defeat of Clarecastle. He later added a Clare U21AHC title to his collection in 2021. At adult level, Mounsey was a member of the Corofin team that beat Kildysart to secure the Clare IFC title in 2021.

Mounsey first appeared on the inter-county scene with Clare at minor level in 2018. He later spent three years with the under-20 team, but ended his underage career without any success. Mounsey earned a call-up to the senior team in November 2021.

== Honours ==
Corofin/Ruan

- Clare Under-21 A Hurling Championshio: 2021
- Clare Minor A Hurling Championship: 2019 (c)

Corofin

- Clare Intermediate Football Championship: 2021
