= Darragh Lohan =

Irish hurler

Personal information
- Native name: Darragh Ó Leocháin (Irish)
- Born: 2000 (age 25–26) Shannon, County Clare, Ireland
- Occupation: Secondary school teacher
- Height: 6 ft 1 in (185 cm)

Sport
- Sport: Hurling
- Position: Midfield
Club
- Years: Club
- Wolfe Tones na Sionna
Club titles
- Clare titles: 0
College(s)
- Years: College
- Mary Immaculate College; University of Limerick
College titles
- Fitzgibbon titles: 1 (2023)
Inter-county
- Years: County
- 2021-present: Clare
Inter-county titles
- Munster titles: 0
- All-Irelands: 1
- NHL: 1
- All Stars: 0

Darragh Lohan (born 2000) is an Irish hurler. At club he plays with Wolfe Tones na Sionna, while he has also lined out at inter-county level with various Clare teams. He usually lines out at midfield.

== Playing career ==
Lohan first played hurling to a high standard as a student at St Caimin's Community School in Shannon, while he also played a range of other sports including soccer. He later lined out in the Fitzgibbon Cup as a student with Mary Immaculate College, before later playing with University of Limerick. Lohan captained University of Limerick to a 2–14 to 1–15 defeat by Mary Immaculate College in the 2024 final.

At club level, Lohan first played hurling at underage levels with Wolfe Tones na Sionna, before eventually progressing to the club's senior team. He first appeared on the inter-county scene with Clare during a two-year tenure with the under-20 team. Lohan was drafted onto the senior team in 2021 but didn't make his championship debut until 2023.

Lohan claimed his first silverware when Clare beat Kilkenny to win the National League title in 2024.

== Coaching career ==
Lohan's work as a secondary school teacher has also seen him involved as a coach to various teams at St Caimin's Community School and in St. Patrick's Comprehensive School.

== Personal life ==
He is a nephew of former Clare hurlers Brian and Frank Lohan.

== Honours ==
Clare

- All-Ireland Senior Hurling Championship: 2024
- National Hurling League: 2024
