= GAA/GPA Young Hurler of the Year =

Annual gaelic sports award

- Sport: Hurling
- Competition: All-Ireland Senior Championship
- Country: Ireland
- Presented by: GAA and GPA

History
- First award: 1996
- Editions: 23
- First winner: Mark Foley
- Most recent: Darragh McCarthy

The Gaelic Athletic Association/Gaelic Players Association Young Hurler of the Year (known for sponsorship reasons as the PwC GAA/GPA Young Hurler of the Year, or simply the Young Hurler of the Year) is an annual award given to the player aged 21 or under at the start of the season who is adjudged to have been the best during the All-Ireland Championship. The award has been presented since the 1996 All-Ireland Championship. The winner is chosen by a vote amongst the members of the players' trade union, the Gaelic Players Association (GPA). The first winner of the award was Limerick defender Mark Foley. The current holder is Adrian Mullen, who won the award for Kilkenny GAA in 2019. The only players to win the award twice are Eoin Kelly, who won it in 2001 and 2002; and Eoin Cody, in 2020 and 2021.

A shortlist of nominees is published in September. The winner, along with the winners of the GAA/GPA's other annual awards, is announced at a gala event in Dublin in November. Players consider the award to be highly prestigious, because the winner is chosen by his peers.

== Winners ==
The award has been presented on 24 occasions as of 2019, with 23 different winners. The table also indicates where the winning player also won one of the other major "hurler of the year" awards, namely the GAA/GPA Hurler of the Year award (HOTY).

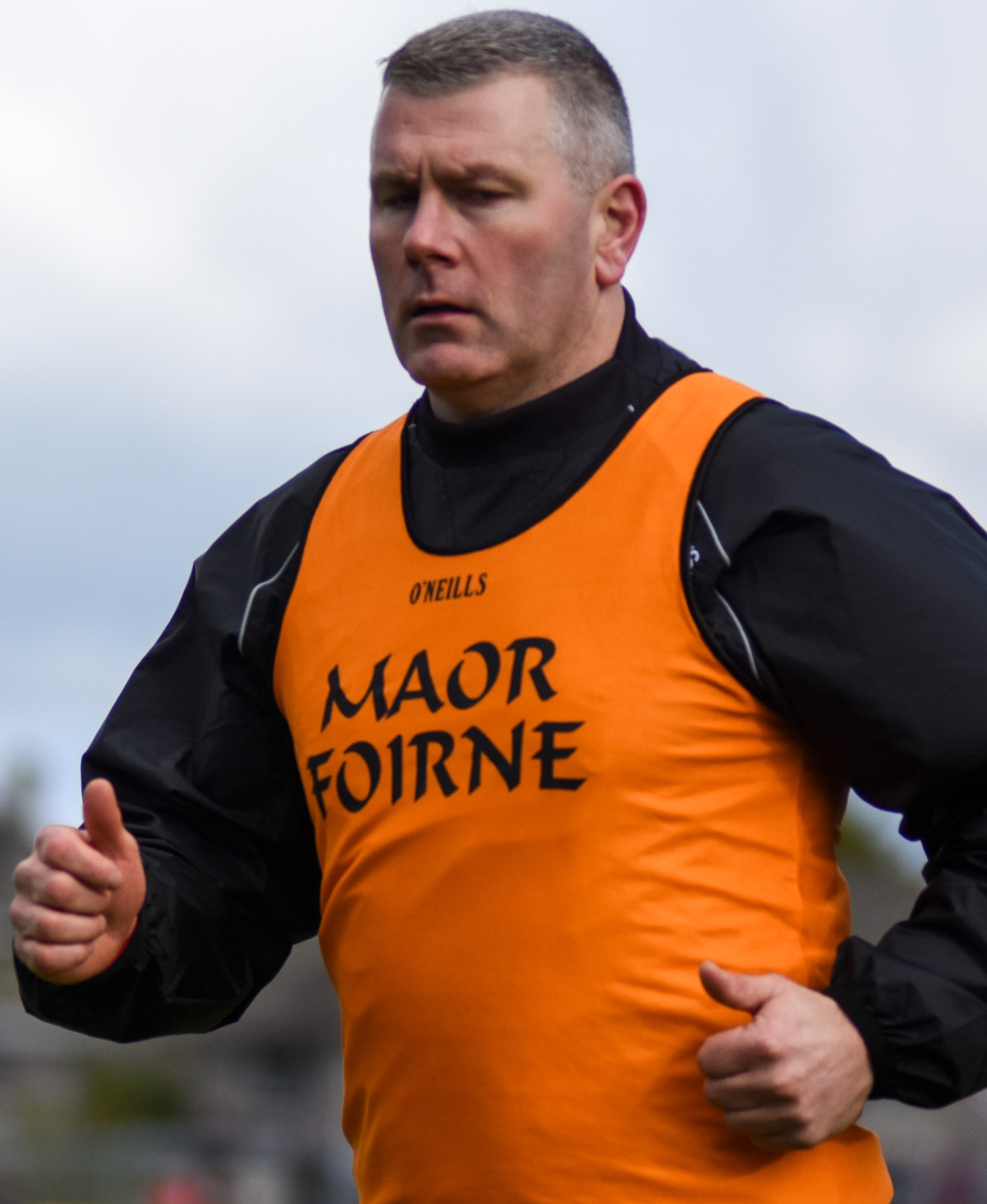
Diarmuid O'Sullivan was Cork's first award-winner in 1999.

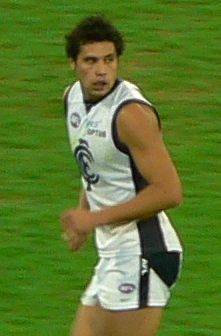
Setanta Ó hAilpín

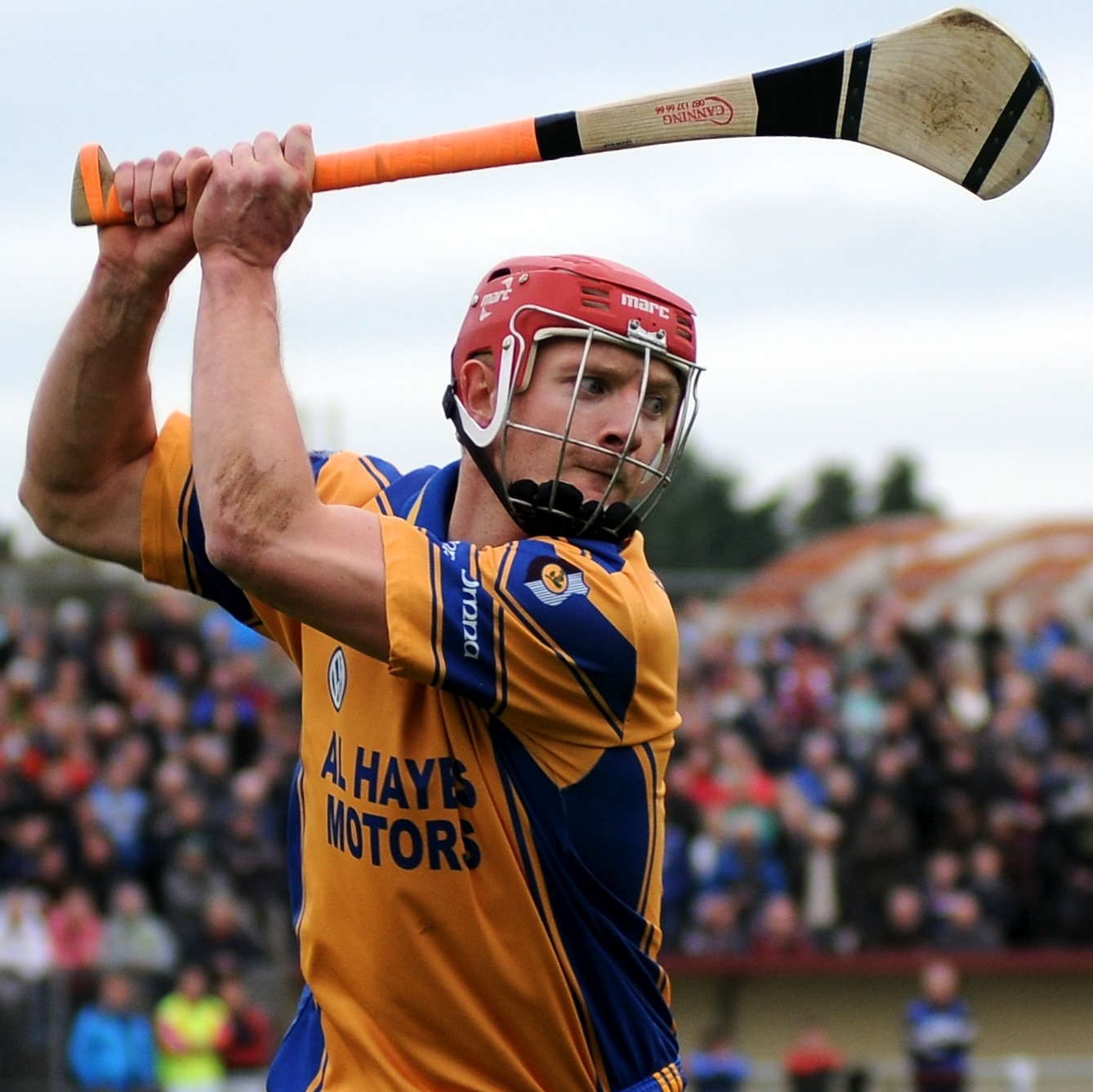
Joe Canning was Galway's first award-winner in 2008.

Year		Player	County	Also won	Notes
1996	Border	Mark Foley	Limerick		
1997	Border	Eugene O'Neill	Tipperary		
1998	Border	Stephen Byrne	Offaly		
1999	Border	Diarmuid O'Sullivan	Cork		
2000	Border	Noel Hickey	Kilkenny		
2001	Border	Eoin Kelly	Tipperary		
2002	Border	Eoin Kelly	Tipperary		
2003	Border	Setanta Ó hAilpín	Cork		
2004	Border	Brian Murphy	Cork		
2005	Border	David Collins	Galway		
2006	Border	James Fitzpatrick	Kilkenny		
2007	Border	Séamus Hickey	Limerick		
2008	Border	Joe Canning	Galway		
2009	Border	Noel McGrath	Tipperary		
2010	Border	Brendan Maher	Tipperary		
2011	Border	Liam Rushe	Dublin		
2012	Border	Johnny Coen	Galway		
2013	Border	Tony Kelly	Clare	HOTY	
2014	Border	Cathal Barrett	Tipperary		
2015	Border	Tadhg de Búrca	Waterford		
2016	Border	Austin Gleeson	Waterford	HOTY	
2017	Border	Conor Whelan	Galway		
2018	Border	Kyle Hayes	Limerick		
2019	Border	Adrian Mullen	Kilkenny		
2020	Border	Eoin Cody	Kilkenny		
2021	Border	Eoin Cody	Kilkenny		
2022	Border	Mikey Butler	Kilkenny		
2023	Border	Mark Rodgers	Clare		
2024	Border	Adam Hogan	Clare		
2025	Border	Darragh McCarthy	Tipperary		

== Breakdown of winners ==
County	Number of wins	Winning years
Tipperary	7	1997, 2001, 2002, 2009, 2010, 2014, 2025
Kilkenny	6	2000, 2006, 2019, 2020, 2021, 2022
Galway	4	2005, 2008, 2012, 2017
Limerick	3	1996, 2007, 2018
Cork	3	1999, 2003, 2004
Waterford	2	2015, 2016
Clare	3	2013, 2023, 2024
Offaly	1	1998
Dublin	1	2011
