= Fergal O'Connor =

Irish hurler

Personal information
- Native name: Ferghal Ó Conchubhair (Irish)
- Born: 5 April 2002 (age 24) Effin, County Limerick, Ireland
- Occupation: Student

Sport
- Sport: Hurling
- Position: Right corner-back
Club
- Years: Club
- Effin
Club titles
- Limerick titles: 0
College
- Years: College
- University of Limerick
College titles
- Fitzgibbon titles: 1
Inter-county*
Years	County	Apps (scores)
2022-present	Limerick	2 (0-00)
Inter-county titles
- Munster titles: 3
- All-Irelands: 2
- NHL: 1
- All Stars: 0
- *Inter County team apps and scores correct as of 20:13, 09 June 2024.

Fergal O'Connor (born 5 April 2002) is an Irish hurler. At club level he plays with Effin, while he is also a member of the Limerick senior hurling team.

== Career ==
O'Connor first played hurling at juvenile and underage levels with the Effin club, before progressing to adult level. He was part of the club's intermediate team that won the Limerick IHC title after a defeat of Croagh-Kilfinny in 2021. O'Connor won a Fitzgibbon Cup medal with University of Limerick in 2023.

O'Connor first appeared at inter-county level with Limerick as a member of the minor team that won the Munster MHC title in 2019. He later joined the under-20 team and was at full-back when Limerick were beaten by Kilkenny in the 2022 All-Ireland under-20 final. O'Connor was also drafted onto the senior team that year and was part of the extended panel when Limerick won the All-Ireland SHC titles in 2022 and 2023.

== Career statistics ==
As of 22 March 2025.

Team	Year	National League			Munster		All-Ireland		Total	
Team	Year	Division	Apps	Score	Apps	Score	Apps	Score	Apps	Score
Limerick	2024	Division 1A	1	0-00	0	0-00	1	0-00	2	0-00
Limerick	2025		3	0-00	0	0-00	0	0-00	3	0-00
Career total			4	0-00	0	0-00	1	0-00	5	0-01

== Honours ==
University of Limerick

- Fitzgibbon Cup: 2023

Effin

- Limerick Intermediate Hurling Championship: 2021

Limerick

- All-Ireland Senior Hurling Championship: 2022, 2023
- Munster Senior Hurling Championship: 2022, 2023
- National Hurling League: 2023
- Munster Under-20 Hurling Championship: 2022
- Munster Minor Hurling Championship: 2019
