= Diarmuid Ryan =

Irish hurler (born 1999)

Personal information
- Native name: Diarmuid Ó Riain (Irish)
- Born: 1999 (age 26–27) Cratloe, County Clare, Ireland
- Occupation: Student
- Height: 6 ft 4 in (193 cm)

Sport
- Sport: Hurling
- Position: Right wing-back
Club
- Years: Club
- Cratloe
Club titles
	Football	Hurling
Clare titles	1	0
College
- Years: College
- Mary Immaculate College
College titles
- Fitzgibbon titles: 1
Inter-county
- Years: County
- 2018-present: Clare
Inter-county titles
- Munster titles: 0
- All-Irelands: 1
- NHL: 1
- All Stars: 0

Diarmuid Ryan (born 1999) is an Irish hurler. At club he plays with Cratloe, while he has also lined out at inter-county level with various Clare teams. He usually lines out at right wing-back.

== Career ==
Ryan first played hurling to a high standard as a student at Ardscoil Rís in Limerick. Regarded as a late developer, he was overlooked for the Dean Ryan Cup team but was later vice-captain of the senior team that won the Harty Cup title in 2018. Ryan later received a scholarship to Mary Immaculate College and has lined out with them in the Fitzgibbon Cup.

At club level, Ryan first played hurling at underage levels with Cratloe, before eventually progressing to the club's senior team. He first appeared on the inter-county scene with Clare at minor level in 2017, before later being included on the under-21 side. Ryan made his senior team debut in the pre-season Munster League in 2018.

On 21 July 2024, he started in the half-back line as Clare won the All-Ireland for the first time in 11 years after an extra-time win against Cork by 3–29 to 1-34, claiming their fifth All-Ireland title.

== Personal life ==
He is the younger brother of former Clare hurler Conor Ryan.

== Honours ==
Ardscoil Rís

- Dr Harty Cup (1): 2018
- Dean Ryan Cup (1): 2016

Cratloe

- Clare Senior Football Championship (1): 2023

Clare

- All-Ireland Senior Hurling Championship: 2024
- National Hurling League: 2024
