= Rory Hayes (hurler) =

Irish hurler

Personal information
- Native name: Ruaii Ó hAodha (Irish)
- Born: 1996 (age 29–30) Shannon, County Clare, Ireland
- Occupation: Production operations

Sport
- Sport: Hurling
- Position: Right corner-back
Club
- Years: Club
- Wolfe Tones na Sionna
Club titles
- Clare titles: 0
College
- Years: College
- 2015-2019: University of Limerick
College titles
- Fitzgibbon titles: 0
Inter-county*
| Years | County | Apps (scores) |
| 2017-present | Clare | 7 (0-01) |
Inter-county titles
- Munster titles: 0
- All-Irelands: 1
- NHL: 1
- All Stars: 0
- *Inter County team apps and scores correct as of 14:50, 2 July 2021.

Rory Hayes (born 1996) is an Irish hurler who plays for Clare Senior Championship club Wolfe Tones na Sionna and at inter-county level with the Clare senior hurling team. He usually lines out as a corner-back.

== Career ==
A member of the Wolfe Tones club in Shannon, Hayes first came to hurling prominence with St. Caimin's Community School in the Harty Cup. He later lined out with the University of Limerick in the Fitzgibbon Cup. Hayes first appeared on the inter-county scene as a member of the Clare minor team before later lining out with the under-21 side. He made his debut with the Clare senior hurling team during the 2018 Munster League.

== Career statistics ==
As of match played 27 June 2021.

| Team | Year | National League | | | Munster | | All-Ireland | | Total | |
| Team | Year | Division | Apps | Score | Apps | Score | Apps | Score | Apps | Score |
|---|---|---|---|---|---|---|---|---|---|---|
| Clare | 2018 | Division 1A | 0 | 0-00 | 0 | 0-00 | 2 | 0-00 | 2 | 0-00 |
| Clare | 2019 | Division 1A | 4 | 0-00 | 0 | 0-00 | 0 | 0-00 | 4 | 0-00 |
| Clare | 2020 | Division 1B | 2 | 0-00 | 1 | 0-00 | 3 | 0-01 | 6 | 0-01 |
| Clare | 2021 | Division 1B | 5 | 0-00 | 1 | 0-00 | 0 | 0-00 | 6 | 0-00 |
| Career total | | | 11 | 0-00 | 2 | 0-00 | 5 | 0-01 | 18 | 0-01 |

== Honours ==
Clare

- National Hurling League: 2024
- All-Ireland Senior Hurling Championship: 2024
