= 2024 Munster Senior Hurling Championship final =

- Event: 2024 Munster Senior Hurling Championship
| Clare | Limerick |
| 1–20 | 1–26 |
- Date: 9 June 2024
- Venue: Semple Stadium, Thurles
- Man of the Match: Gearóid Hegarty (Limerick)
- Referee: C Lyons (Cork)
- Attendance: 45,148
- Weather: Dry

The 2024 Munster Senior Hurling Championship final was a hurling match that was played on 9 June at Semple Stadium in Thurles. It was contested by defending champions Limerick and Clare.

The game was televised live on RTÉ 2 as part of The Sunday Game, presented by Joanne Cantwell. Commentary on the game was provided by Marty Morrissey, alongside Brendan Cummins.

The throw-in was delayed by 30 minutes due to a power cut at the stadium. Limerick, captained by Declan Hannon, retained the title for a record sixth year in a row after a 1-26 to 1-20 win. No team in Munster had ever won six in a row before.

== Background ==
The two teams were meeting in the Munster final for the third year in a row with Limerick winning the final in 2022 by 1–29 to 0-29 after extra-time and also in 2023 by 1-23 to 1-22. Limerick were bidding to win the Munster title for a sixth successive year and for the 25th time overall, with Clare looking for a first Munster title since 1998 and seventh title overall. This was the 64th championship game between the two counties, Limerick having 40 wins to Clare's 21 with two draws, from the previous 63. 15,000 terrace tickets were made available online on 30 May and sold out in 15 minutes.

== Match ==
=== Details ===
9 June 2024
4:30pm
Final

| Limerick | 1–26 (29) – (23) 1–20 | Clare |
|---|---|---|
| Gearóid Hegarty 1-2; Diarmaid Byrnes (3f), Aaron Gillane (4f) 0-5 each; Tom Morrissey 0-4 (1f); Declan Hannon, Kyle Hayes, David Reidy, Shane O’Brien 0-2 each; Cathal O’Neill, Adam English 0-1 each | Report | Aidan McCarthy 0-8 (6f); Peter Duggan 1-1; David Fitzgerald 0-4; Tony Kelly 0-3; Mark Rodgers 0-2 (2f); Shane O’Donnell, Ian Galvin 0-1 each |

Semple Stadium
Attendance: 45,148
Referee: C Lyons (Cork)
Man of the match: Gearóid Hegarty (Limerick)
