= Mark Rodgers =

Irish hurler (born 2001)

Personal information
- Native name: Marcus Mac Ruairí (Irish)
- Born: 2001 (age 24–25) Scariff, County Clare, Ireland

Sport
- Sport: Hurling
- Position: Complete forward
Club
- Years: Club
- 2019-present: Scariff
Club titles
- Clare titles: 0
- Munster titles: Munster
College
- Years: College
- 2019-2023: University of Limerick
College titles
- Fitzgibbon titles: Two
Inter-county*
Years	County	Apps (scores)
Debut 2021- present	Clare	26 (9-85)
Inter-county titles
- Munster titles: 0
- All-Irelands: 1 (2024)
- NHL: 1 (2024)
- All Stars: 1 (All-star corner-forward 2024)
- *Inter County team apps and scores correct as of 17:16, 06 November 2025.

Mark Rodgers (born 2001) plays hurling for his native parish Scariff and at inter-county level with All-Ireland champions Clare.

== Career and education ==
Rodgers had his first hurling successes as a student at Scariff Community College. He was part of the college team that beat St Fergal's College to claim the All-Ireland Colleges SCHC title in 2018. Rodgers later had success with University of Limerick, winning back-to-back Fitzgibbon Cup titles in 2022 and 2023.

At club level, Rodgers first played at juvenile and underage levels with Scariff before eventually joining the club's top adult team. He won a Clare IHC title in 2020 after Scariff beat Tubber in the final.

Rodgers first appeared on the inter-county scene as a member of the Clare minor hurling team in 2018. He later spent two seasons with the Clare under-20 hurling team before being drafted onto the Clare senior hurling team in 2021. Rodgers won a National Hurling League medal in 2024.

On 21 July 2024, he started in the half-forward line as Clare won the All-Ireland for the first time in 11 years after an extra-time win against Cork by 3–29 to 1-34, claiming their fifth All-Ireland title. Rodgers won an All Star at the end of the 2024 season.

== Career statistics ==
As of 4 May 2026

Team	Year	National League			Munster		All-Ireland		Total	
Team	Year	Division	Apps	Score	Apps	Score	Apps	Score	Apps	Score
Clare	2021	Division 1B	4	1-06	2	0-02	2	0-00	8	1-08
Clare	2022	Division 1B	2	1-17	1	0-02	2	0-02	5	1-21
Clare	2023	Division 1A	3	3-02	5	3-06	2	1-21	10	7-29
Clare	2024	Division 1A	5	0-21	5	2-17	3	1-11	13	3-49
Clare	2025	Division 1A	4	1-07	4	2-24	—		8	3-31
Clare	2026	Division 1B	7	1-62	2	0-21	0	0-00	9	1-83
Career total			25	7-115	19	7-72	9	2-34	53	16-221

== Honours ==
=== Team ===
Scariff Community College

- All-Ireland Colleges Senior C Hurling Championship: 2018

University of Limerick

- Fitzgibbon Cup: 2022, 2023 (jc)

Scariff

- Clare Intermediate Hurling Championship: 2020

Scariff/Ogonnoloe

- Clare Minor B Championship 2018
- Clare U21A Hurling Championship 2022

Clare

- All-Ireland Senior Hurling Championship: 2024
- National Hurling League: 2024

=== Individual ===
Awards

- All Star (1): 2024
- GAA-GPA Young Hurler of the Year (1): 2023
- The Sunday Game Team of the Year: 2024
