= 2024 All-Ireland Senior Hurling Championship =

Championship details
- Dates: 21 April – 21 July 2024
- Teams: 17

All-Ireland champions
- Winning team: Clare (5th win)
- Captain: Tony Kelly
- Manager: Brian Lohan

All-Ireland Finalists
- Losing team: Cork
- Captain: Seán O'Donoghue
- Manager: Pat Ryan

Provincial champions
- Munster: Limerick
- Leinster: Kilkenny
- Ulster: Not Played
- Connacht: Not Played

Championship statistics
- Top Scorer: Patrick Horgan (5–74)
- All-Star Team: See here

The 2024 All-Ireland Senior Hurling Championship (SHC) was the 137th staging of the All-Ireland Senior Hurling Championship, the Gaelic Athletic Association's premier inter-county hurling tournament, since its establishment in 1887.

The 2024 championship began with provincial tournaments in April and ended with the All-Ireland Final on 21 July.

Limerick entered the competition as the defending champion, having won the previous four titles. They were attempting to become the first team in history to win five-in-a-row, a feat never achieved in hurling. This had previously been attempted by Cork in 1945 and Kilkenny in 2010, both thwarted by Tipperary.

The final was played on 21 July 2024 at Croke Park in Dublin, between Clare and Cork. Clare won that game by 3–29 to 1–34, thus claiming a fifth title.

== Format ==
=== Leinster Championship ===
Participating counties (6): Antrim, Carlow, Dublin, Galway, Kilkenny, Wexford

Group stage (15 matches): Each team plays each other once. The 1st and 2nd placed teams advance to the Leinster final and the 3rd placed team advances to the all-Ireland preliminary quarter-finals. All other teams are eliminated from the championship and the bottom placed team will be relegated to the 2025 Joe McDonagh Cup.

Final (1 match): The top two teams in the group stage contest this game. The Leinster champions advance to the All-Ireland semi-finals and the Leinster runners-up advance to the All-Ireland quarter-finals.

=== Munster Championship ===
Participating counties (5): Clare, Cork, Limerick, Tipperary, Waterford

Group stage (10 matches): Each team plays each other once. The 1st and 2nd placed teams advance to the Munster final and the 3rd placed team advances to the all-Ireland preliminary quarter-finals. All other teams are eliminated from the championship.

Final (1 match): The top two teams in the group stage contest this game. The Munster champions advance to the All-Ireland semi-finals and the Munster runners-up advance to the All-Ireland quarter-finals.

=== Joe McDonagh Cup ===
Participating counties (6): Down, Kerry, Laois, Meath, Offaly, Westmeath

Group stage (15 matches): Each team plays each other once. The 1st and 2nd placed teams advance to the Joe McDonagh Cup final. All other teams are eliminated from the championship and the bottom placed team are relegated to the 2025 Christy Ring Cup.

Final (1 match): The top two teams in the group stage contest this game. The Joe McDonagh Cup champions and runners-up advance to the All-Ireland preliminary quarter-finals.

=== All-Ireland Championship ===
Preliminary quarter-finals (2 matches): The 3rd placed teams from the Leinster and Munster championships play the Joe McDonagh Cup champions and runners-up. Two teams are eliminated at this stage while the winners advance to the quarter-finals.

Quarter-finals (2 matches): The winners of the preliminary quarter-finals join the Leinster and Munster runners-up to make up the quarter-final pairings. Teams who may have already met in the provincial championships are kept apart in separate quarter-finals. Two teams are eliminated at this stage while the winners advance to the semi-finals.

Semi-finals (2 matches): The winners of the quarter-finals join the Leinster and Munster champions to make up the semi-final pairings. Teams who may have already met in the provincial championships are kept apart in separate semi-finals where possible. Two teams are eliminated at this stage while the winners advance to the final.

Final (1 match): The two winners of the semi-finals contest this game.

== Team changes ==
=== To championship ===
Promoted from the Christy Ring Cup

- Meath

=== From championship ===
Relegated to the Christy Ring Cup

- Kildare

== Teams ==
=== General information ===
Seventeen counties competed in the All-Ireland Senior Hurling Championship: six teams in the Leinster Senior Hurling Championship, five teams in the Munster Senior Hurling Championship and six teams in the Joe McDonagh Cup.

County	Last provincial title	Last championship title	Position in 2023 championship	Current championship
Antrim	2017	—	5th (Leinster Senior Hurling Championship)	Leinster Senior Hurling Championship
Carlow	—	—	Preliminary quarter-finals	Leinster Senior Hurling Championship
Clare	1998	2013	Semi-finals	Munster Senior Hurling Championship
Cork	2018	2005	4th (Munster Senior Hurling Championship)	Munster Senior Hurling Championship
Down	1997	—	5th (Joe McDonagh Cup)	Joe McDonagh Cup
Dublin	2013	1938	Quarter-finals	Leinster Senior Hurling Championship
Galway	2018	2017	Semi-finals	Leinster Senior Hurling Championship
Kerry	1891	1891	4th (Joe McDonagh Cup)	Joe McDonagh Cup
Kilkenny	2023	2015	Runners-up	Leinster Senior Hurling Championship
Laois	1949	1915	3rd (Joe McDonagh Cup)	Joe McDonagh Cup
Limerick	2023	2023	Champions	Munster Senior Hurling Championship
Meath	—	—	Champions (Christy Ring Cup)	Joe McDonagh Cup
Offaly	1995	1998	Preliminary quarter-finals	Joe McDonagh Cup
Tipperary	2016	2019	Quarter-finals	Munster Senior Hurling Championship
Waterford	2010	1959	5th (Munster Senior Hurling Championship)	Munster Senior Hurling Championship
Westmeath	—	—	6th (Leinster Senior Hurling Championship)	Joe McDonagh Cup
Wexford	2019	1996	4th (Leinster Senior Hurling Championship)	Leinster Senior Hurling Championship

=== Personnel and kits ===
County	Manager	Captain(s)	Sponsor
Antrim	Darren Gleeson	Conor McCann	Fibrus
Carlow	Tom Mullally	Kevin McDonald (hurler)	SETU
Clare	Brian Lohan	Tony Kelly	Pat O'Donnell
Cork	Pat Ryan	Sean O'Donoghue	Sports Direct
Down	Ronan Sheehan	TBD	EOS IT Solutions
Dublin	Micheál Donoghue	Paddy Smyth	Staycity
Galway	Henry Shefflin	Conor Whelan	Supermac's
Kerry	Stephen Molumphy	Gavin Dooley	Kerry Group
Kilkenny	Derek Lyng	Richie Reid and Eoin Cody	Avonmore
Laois	Willie Maher	Enda Rowland	Laois Hire
Limerick	John Kiely	Declan Hannon	JP McManus
Meath	Seoirse Bulfin	Charlie Ennis/Jack Regan	Glenveagh
Offaly	Johnny Kelly	Jason Sampson	Glenisk
Tipperary	Liam Cahill	Ronan Maher	Fiserv
Waterford	Davy Fitzgerald	Jamie Barron and Stephen Bennett	Suir Engineering
Westmeath	Joe Fortune	Aonghus Clarke and Killian Doyle	Renault
Wexford	Keith Rossiter	Lee Chin and Kevin Foley	Zurich Insurance Group

== Leinster Senior Hurling Championship ==
=== Group stage ===
Pos	Team	Pld	W	D	L	SF	SA	Diff	Pts	Qualification
1	Kilkenny	5	3	2	0	8–131	7–99	+35	8	Advance to Leinster final
2	Dublin	5	3	1	1	10–124	4–113	+29	7	Advance to Leinster final
3	Wexford	5	2	1	2	8–125	6–100	+31	5	Advance to All-Ireland preliminary quarter-finals
4	Galway	5	2	1	2	7–120	6–112	+11	5	
5	Antrim	5	2	0	3	8–89	14–129	−58	4	
6	Carlow	5	0	1	4	6–91	10–127	−48	1	Relegated to Joe McDonagh Cup

=== Leinster round 1 ===
21 April 2024 Round 1	Wexford	1–21 (24) – (24) 2–18	Dublin	Wexford
2pm		(HT: 1–8 – 0–11)		Venue: Wexford Park
	Pts: Lee Chin 1–12 (1–0 penalty, 0–9 frees), Rory O’Connor 0–4, Mark Fanning, Conor McDonald, Conor Hearne, Cian Byrne, Cathal Dunbar 0–1 each	Report	Pts: Donal Burke 0–7 (6 frees, 1 ‘65), Cian O’Sullivan (0–2 frees), Danny Sutcliffe 1–2 each, Mark Grogan 0–2, Paddy Doyle, Conor Burke, Chris Crummey, Seán Currie, Ronan Hayes 0–1 each	Referee: J Murphy (Limerick); Attendance: 9,754

21 April 2024 Round 1	Galway	2–25 (31) – (20) 2–14	Carlow	Galway
2pm		(HT: 1–14 – 0-09)		Venue: Pearse Stadium
	Pts: Conor Cooney 1–10 (3f, 2 65s), Gavin Lee 1–2, Cathal Mannion and Conor Whelan 0–3 each, Tom Monaghan 0–2, Declan McLoughlin, Donal O'Shea, Adrian Touhey, Ronan Glennon and Evan Niland 0–1 each	Report	Pts: Martin Kavanagh 0–8 (5f), Jon Nolan 1–1, Conor Kehoe 1–0, Chris Nolan 0–2, Ciarán Whelan, Tony Lawlor and John Michael Nolan 0–1 each	Referee: S Stack (Dublin); Attendance: ~1,500

21 April 2024 Round 1	Kilkenny	5–30 (45) – (13) 0–13	Antrim	Kilkenny
2:30pm		(HT: 1–15 – 0–7)		Venue: Nowlan Park
	Pts: Billy Drennan 1–6 (1–0 pen, 0-2f, 0–1 65), Owen Wall 2–2, TJ Reid 1–5 (0-3f), Gearoid Dunne 1–1, Cian Kenny 0–4, John Donnelly 0–3, Martin Keoghan 0–3, Paddy Deegan 0–2, Adrian Mullen 0–1, Richie Reid 0–1, Mikey Carey 0–1, Shane Murphy 0–1	Report	Pts: Conal Cunning 0–7 (0-7f), James McNaughton 0–2, Conor McCann 0–1, Nigel Elliott 0–1, Eoghan Campbell 0–1, Conal Bohill 0–1	Referee: S Hynes (Galway); Attendance: 2,855

=== Leinster round 2 ===
27 April 2024 Round 2	Antrim	2–22 (28) – (26) 2–20	Wexford	Belfast
3pm		(HT: 0–12 – 2–9)		Venue: Corrigan Park
	Pts: C Cunning 0–7 (7fs), S Elliott 1–3, N McKenna 1–1, G Walsh 0–4 (1f, 1sl), K Molloy 0–2, J McNaughton 0–3 (2fs), C Boyd 0–1, N Elliott 0–1	Report	Pts: L Chin 2–11 (1–0 pen, 6fs), C Byrne 0–4, C McDonald 0–2, C Dunbar 0–1, R O'Connor 0–1, L Og McGovern 0–1	Referee: C Lyons (Cork); TV: GAAGO

27 April 2024 Round 2	Carlow	0–22 (22) – (27) 1–24	Dublin	Carlow
6pm		(HT: 0–13 – 0–9)		Venue: Dr Cullen Park
	Pts: M Kavanagh 0–13 (9fs, 2 65s); J Nolan 0–3; C Kehoe 0–2; C Nolan, P Boland, F Fitzpatrick, C Whelan 0–1 each	Report	Pts: D Burke 0–9 (8fs); F Whitely 1–1; C Burke 0–3; D Sutcliffe, D Gray, E O’Donnell 0–2 each; C O’Sullivan, S Currie, D Purcell, P Doyle, C Crummey 0–1 each	Referee: C Flynn (Westmeath); Attendance: ~1,500

28 April 2024 Round 2	Galway	2–23 (29) – (29) 0–29	Kilkenny	Galway
2pm		(HT: 1–9 – 0–16)		Venue: Pearse Stadium
	Pts: Evan Niland 0–7 (6fs), Gavin Lee 1–2, Brian Concannon 1–1, Cathal Mannion and Conor Cooney (2fs, 165) 0–4 each, Conor Whelan 0–3, Cianan Fahy 0–2	Report	Pts: TJ Reid 0–8 (6fs, 165), Martin Keoghan and John Donnelly 0–4 each, Cian Kenny and Tom Phelan 0–3 each, Richie Reid and Jordan Molloy 0–2 each, Mikey Butler, David Blanchfield, and Billy Ryan 0–1 each	Referee: T Walsh (Waterford); Attendance: 9,621; TV: RTÉ2

=== Leinster round 3 ===
4 May 2024 Round 3	Wexford	1–28 (31) – (23) 0–23	Galway	Wexford
16:00		(HT: 0–15 – 0–13)		Venue: Wexford Park
	Pts: Lee Chin 0–11 (7 frees, 1 ’65), Rory O’Connor 1–6, Mark Fanning (frees), Conor McDonald, Cian Byrne 0–2 each, Conor Hearne, Damien Reck, Liam Óg McGovern, Conor Foley, Cathal Dunbar 0–1 each	Report	Pts: Evan Niland 0–11 (10 frees), Conor Cooney (one free), Gavin Lee, Tom Monaghan 0–2 each, Brian Concannon, Cianan Fahy, Conor Whelan, Ronan Glennon, Padraic Mannion, Declan McLoughlin 0–1 each	Referee: S Stack (Dublin); Attendance: 6,170; TV: GAAGO

11 May 2024 Round 3	Dublin	3–32 (41) – (21) 1–18	Antrim	Dublin
16:00		(HT: 1–13 – 1–7)		Venue: Parnell Park
	Pts: Donal Burke 1–11 (1-8fs), Sean Currie 0–5, Conor Burke 0–5, Paul Crummey 1–0, Brian Hayes 1–0, Cian O'Sullivan 0–2, John Bellew 0–2, Ronan Hayes 0–2, Danny Sutcliffe 0–1, Conor Donohoe 0–1, Fergal Whitely 0–1, Sean Gallagher 0–1, Darragh Power 0–1	Report	Pts: James McNaughton 1–2, Conal Cunning 0–4 (4fs), Eoghan Campbell 0–3, Seaan Elliott 0–2, Keelan Molloy 0–2, Gerard Walsh 0–2 (1f), Niall McKenna 0–1, Nigel Elliott 0–1, Fred McCurry 0–1	Referee: K Jordan (Tipperary)

11 May 2024 Round 3	Carlow	1–20 (23) – (23) 1–20	Kilkenny	Carlow
16:30		(HT: 0–9 – 1–11)		Venue: Dr Cullen Park
	Pts: Marty Kavanagh 0–9 (8fs, 65), Chris Nolan 0–4, Conor Kehoe 1–0, Fiachra Fitzpatrick 0–2, Kevin McDonald (f), John Michael Nolan, James Doyle, Paddy Boland, Donagh Murphy 0–1 each	Report	Pts: TJ Reid 0–6 (4fs), Owen Wall 1–3, Martin Keoghan, Cian Kenny 0–3 each, Tom Phelan 0–2, Huw Lawlor, Billy Ryan, Shane Murphy 0–1 each	Referee: C Mooney (Dublin); TV: GAAGO

=== Leinster round 4 ===
18 May 2024 Round 4	Antrim	1–14 (17) – (31) 2–25	Galway	Belfast
3pm		(HT: 1–11 – 1–10)		Venue: Corrigan Park
	Pts: J McNaughton 0–8 (4fs), K Molloy 0–3, C Bohill 1–0, G Walsh 0–2 (1f, 1sl), M Bradley 0–1	Report	Pts: C Cooney 1–6 (1–0 pen, 3fs, 0–1 ), E Niland 0–5 (3fs), C Whelan 0–3, G Lee 1–0, S Linnane 0–2, D O'Shea 0–2, David Burke 0–1, Daithí Burke 0–1, P Mannion 0–1, C Fahy 0–1, T Monaghan 0–1, J Cooney 0–1, J Glynn 0–1	Referee: M Kennedy (Tipperary)

18 May 2024 Round 4	Dublin	2–23 (29) – (31) 1–28	Kilkenny	Dublin
6pm		(HT: 1–12 – 0–16)		Venue: Parnell Park
	Pts: Donal Burke 0–14 (0-10f, 0–1 65), Conor Burke 1–1, Brian Hayes 1–0, Danny Sutcliffe 0–3, Chris Crummey 0–3, Cian O'Sullivan 0–2	Report	Pts: TJ Reid 0–8 (7fs), John Donnelly 0–7, Eoin Cody 1–3, Martin Keoghan 0–3, David Blanchfield 0–3, Cian Kenny 0–2, Mikey Carey 0–1, Billy Ryan 0–1	Referee: J Murphy (Limerick); Attendance: 7,028; TV: GAAGO

19 May 2024 Round 4	Carlow	1–13 (16) – (42) 2–36	Wexford	Carlow
3pm		(HT: 1–7 – 1–21)		Venue: Dr Cullen Park
	Pts: Marty Kavanagh 0-5fs, Conor Kehoe 1–2, Chris Nolan 0–4, Paddy Boland, Richard Coady 0–1 each	Report	Pts: Lee Chin 0–13 (10fs), Conor McDonald 2–2, Rory O’Connor 0–5, Cathal Dunbar, Damien Reck, Conor Hearne, Tomás Kinsella 0–2 each, Liam Og McGovern, Mark Fanning, Richie Lawlor, Liam Ryan, Darragh Carley, Kevin Foley, Charlie McGuckin, Seamus Casey 0–1 each	Referee: T Gleeson (Dublin); Attendance: ~7,000

=== Leinster round 5 ===
26 May 2024 Round 5	Kilkenny	1–24 (27) – (26) 2–20	Wexford	Kilkenny
14:00		(HT: 0–12 – 1–11)		Venue: Nowlan Park
	Pts: TJ Reid 1–13 (1-0pen, 12fs, 1 sideline), Paddy Deegan 0–3, Billy Ryan 0–3, John Donnelly 0–1, Richie Reid 0–1, Martin Keoghan 0–1, Mikey Carey 0–1, Eoin Cody 0–1	Report	Pts: Lee Chin 0–7 (6fs), Cian Byrne 1–3, Conor McDonald 1–2, Rory O'Connor 0–2, Cathal Dunbar 0–2, Liam Og McGovern 0–1, Kevin Foley 0–1, Jack O'Connor 0–1, Conor Hearne 0–1	Referee: L Gordon (Galway); Attendance: 18,785; TV: GAAGO

26 May 2024 Round 5	Galway	1–24 (27) – (33) 2–27	Dublin	Galway
14:00		(HT: 0–19 – 2–11)		Venue: Pearse Stadium
	Pts: Evan Niland 0–8 (5fs, 1 65), Conor Cooney 0–3, Declan McLoughlin 1–0, Joseph Cooney, Tom Monaghan and Cianan Fahy 0–2 each, Gavin Lee, Seán Linnane, Jason Flynn, David Burke, Conor Whelan, Padraic Mannion and Adrian Tuohey 0–1 each	Report	Pts: Dónal Burke 1–10 (3fs, 2 65s), Chris Crummey 0–4, Darragh Power 0–3, Seán Currie 1–0, Fergal Whiteley, Conor Burke, Brian Hayes, John Bellew, Ronan Hayes, Dara Purcell, Danny Sutcliffe, Paddy Smyth, Conor Donohue and Colin Currie 0–1 each	Referee: C Lyons (Cork); Attendance: 8,087; TV: RTÉ2

26 May 2024 Round 5	Antrim	4–22 (34) – (28) 2–22	Carlow	Belfast
14:00		(HT: 3–9 – 1–14)		Venue: Corrigan Park
	Pts: C Cunning 2–7 (1–0 pen, 6fs, 2 65s), J McNaughton 2–3, K Molloy 0–3, N O'Connor 0–2, G Walsh 0–2 (2fs), S Elliott 0–1, P Burke 0–1, N Elliott 0–1, C McCann 0–1, C Boyd 0–1	Report	Pts: M Kavanagh 1–11 (8fs, 2 65s), C Nolan 1–1, J Doyle 0–3, C Kehoe 0–3, JM Nolan 0–1, C Whelan 0–1, J Kavanagh 0–1, K McDonald 0–1	Referee: J Owens (Wexford)

=== Leinster final ===
8 June 2024
6pm
Final

Kilkenny	3–28 (37) – (21) 1–18	Dublin
TJ Reid 2–6 (0-3f); A Mullen 0–7; E Cody 1–2; C Kenny 0–4; J Donnelly 0–3; M Keoghan 0–2; B Ryan, D Blanchfield, T Phelan, W Walsh 0–1 each	Report	D Burke 0–8 (7f); C Burke 0–3; M Grogan 1–0; D Purcell 0–2; J Bellew, P Smyth, C Crummey, D Sutcliffe, D Power 0–1 each

Croke Park
Attendance: 35,484
Referee: T Walsh (Waterford)
Man of the match: Adrian Mullen (Kilkenny)
- Kilkenny advance to the All-Ireland semi-finals and Dublin advance to the All-Ireland quarter-finals

== Munster Senior Hurling Championship ==
=== Group stage ===
Pos	Team	Pld	W	D	L	SF	SA	Diff	Pts	Qualification
1	Limerick	4	3	0	1	8–98	6–78	+26	6	Advance to Munster final
2	Clare	4	3	0	1	9–89	8–89	+3	6	Advance to Munster final
3	Cork	4	2	0	2	11–107	9–98	+15	4	Advance to All-Ireland preliminary quarter-finals
4	Waterford	4	1	1	2	9–86	6–103	−8	3	
5	Tipperary	4	0	1	3	2–90	10–102	−36	1	

=== Munster round 1 ===
21 April 2024 Round 1	Clare	1–18 (21) – (24) 3–15	Limerick	Ennis
2pm		(HT: 1–10 – 0–8)		Venue: Cusack Park
	Pts: Aidan McCarthy (1–10, 8f); David Fitzgerald, Mark Rodgers, Tony Kelly (f) (0–2 each); Shane O’Donnell, Seadna Morey (0–1 each)	Report	Pts: Aaron Gillane (1–5, 5f); Donnacha Ó Dalaigh (1–1); Gearoid Hegarty (0–3); Diarmaid Byrnes (1-0f); Cathal O’Neill, David Reidy (0–2 each); Kyle Hayes, Cian Lynch (0–1 each)	Referee: C Lyons (Cork); Attendance: 20,055; TV: RTÉ2

21 April 2024 Round 1	Waterford	2–25 (31) – (28) 1–25	Cork	Waterford
4pm		(HT: 1–11 – 0–10)		Venue: Walsh Park
	Pts: Dessie Hutchinson 0–10 (9fs), Jamie Barron, Stephen Bennett (1–0 penalty, 1f) 1–3 each, Calum Lyons 0–3, Patrick Curran, Jack Prendergast 0–2 each. Neil Montgomery, Michael Kiely 0–1 each	Report	Pts: Alan Connolly 1–4 (2fs), Patrick Horgan 0–7 (7fs), Darragh Fitzgibbon 0–4, Shane Barrett 0–3, Seamus Harnedy 0–2, Ger Mellerick, Mark Coleman, Conor Lehane, Robbie O'Flynn, Brian Hayes 0–1 each	Referee: M Kennedy (Tipperary); Attendance: 11,973; TV: GAAGO

=== Munster round 2 ===
28 April 2024 Round 2	Cork	3–24 (33) – (35) 3–26	Clare	Cork
14:00		(HT: 0–14 – 0–12)		Venue: Páirc Uí Chaoimh
	Pts: Patrick Horgan 2–10 (1-7fs, 2 65s), Declan Dalton 0–4 (3fs), Séamus Harnedy 0–3, Robert Downey 1–0, Darragh Fitzgibbon, Alan Connolly 0–2, Tim O’Mahony, Ciarán Joyce, Shane Kingston 0–1 each	Report	Pts: Aidan McCarthy 0–10 (8fs), Mark Rodgers 1–6 (1f, 1 sideline), David Fitzgerald, Shane O’Donnell 1–1 each, David Reidy 0–3, Peter Duggan, Diarmuid Ryan 0–2 each, David McInerney 0–1	Referee: J Owens (Wexford); Attendance: 36,841; TV: GAAGO

28 April 2024 Round 2	Limerick	2–27 (33) – (18) 0–18	Tipperary	Limerick
16:00		(HT: 0–12 – 0–7)		Venue: Gaelic Grounds
	Pts: Aaron Gillane 1–8 (7fs), Peter Casey 1–2, Adam English 0–4, Cathal O’Neill, Tom Morrissey 0–3 each, David Reidy, Diarmaid Byrnes (2fs) 0–2 each, Kyle Hayes, William O’Donoghue, Donnacha O Dálaigh 0–1 each	Report	Pts: Jason Forde 0–9 (8fs), Mark Kehoe, Gearoid O’Connor (1f) 0–2 each, Eoghan Connolly, Alan Tynan, Patrick Maher, Noel McGrath, Johnny Ryan 0–1 each	Referee: L Gordon (Galway); Attendance: 33,475; TV: RTÉ2

=== Munster round 3 ===
4 May 2024 Round 3	Waterford	3–21 (30) – (30) 1–27	Tipperary	Waterford
18:00		(HT: 2–8 – 0–12)		Venue: Walsh Park
	Pts: Stephen Bennett 2–3 (1–0 pen); Dessie Hutchinson 0–6 (3f); Jack Prendergast 1–1; Calum Lyons 0–3; Patrick Curran 0–2; Kieran Bennett, Darragh Lyons, Neil Montgomery, Michael Kiely, Jack Fagan, Shane Bennett 0–1 each	Report	Pts: Seánie Kenneally 1–1; Gearóid O’Connor (3f), Mark Kehoe 0–4 each; Jason Forde (2f), Jake Morris 0–3 each; Ronan Maher (1f), Eoghan Connolly, Alan Tynan, Noel McGrath 0–2 each; Michael Breen, Darragh Stakelum, Patrick Maher, John McGrath 0–1 each	Referee: J Owens (Wexford); Attendance: 11,966; TV: GAAGO

11 May 2024 Round 3	Cork	3–28 (37) – (35) 3–26	Limerick	Cork
19:00		(HT: 2–15 – 1–10)		Venue: Páirc Uí Chaoimh
	Pts: Patrick Horgan 1–11 (1–0 pen, 10fs), Shane Barrett, Séamus Harnedy 1–2 each, Darragh Fitzgibbon 0–5, Declan Dalton (2fs), Alan Connolly, Brian Hayes 0–2 each, Ethan Twomey, Shane Kingston 0–1 each	Report	Pts: Séamus Flanagan 3–3, Aaron Gillane 0–7 (7fs), Gearóid Hegarty 0–4, Cathal O’Neill 0–3, Diarmaid Byrnes (2fs), Tom Morrissey 0–2 each, Kyle Hayes, Cian Lynch, David Reidy, Adam English, Aidan O’Connor 0–1 each	Referee: S Stack (Dublin); Attendance: 41,670; TV: GAAGO

=== Munster round 4 ===
19 May 2024 Round 4	Clare	4–21 (33) – (32) 2–26	Waterford	Ennis
2pm		(HT: 2–13 – 0–14)		Venue: Cusack Park
	Pts: David Fitzgerald, Mark Rodgers (1’65) (1–4 each); Aidan McCarthy (0–5, 4f); Darragh Lohan, Tony Kelly (1–0 each); Shane O’Donnell, Ian Galvin (0–2 each); David Reidy, Cathal Malone, Diarmuid Ryan, Peter Duggan (0–1 each)	Report	Pts: Dessie Hutchinson (0–6, 5f); Stephen Bennett, Shane Bennett (1–0 Pen) (1–2 each); Kevin Mahony (0–4); Jack Prendergast, Tadhg de Burca (1f), Padraig Fitzgerald (0–2 each); Kieran Bennett, Jamie Barron, Jack Fagan, Patrick Fitzgerald, Ian Kenny, Calum Lyons (0–1 each)	Referee: L Gordon (Galway); Attendance: 19,893; TV: RTÉ2

19 May 2024 Round 4	Tipperary	1–21 (24) – (42) 4–30	Cork	Thurles
4pm		(HT: 1–12 – 1–15)		Venue: Semple Stadium
	Pts: J. Forde (0–5, 3 frees); M. Kehoe (1–0); J. Morris, J. McGrath (frees) (0–3 each); G. O’Connor, D. Stakelum N. McGrath (0–2 each); A. Tynan, R. Maher (free), C. Bowe, S. Hayes (0–1 each)	Report	Pts: P. Horgan (1–9, 0–5 frees); A. Connolly (3–1); S. Kingston (0–4); D. Fitzgibbon, S. Harnedy (0–3 each); S. Barrett, B. Hayes, R. Downey (0–2 each); N. O’Leary, D. Dalton, C. Lehane, L. Meade (0–1 each)	Referee: T Walsh (Waterford); Attendance: 43,972; TV: RTÉ2

=== Munster round 5 ===
26 May 2024 Round 5	Limerick	0–30 (30) – (20) 2–14	Waterford	Limerick
16:00		(HT: 0–14 – 1–6)		Venue: Gaelic Grounds
	Pts: Aaron Gillane 0–7 (7fs), Tom Morrissey 0–4, Kyle Hayes 0–3, Shane O’Brien 0–3, Diarmaid Byrnes 0–2 (1f), Cathal O’Neill, David Reidy, Gearoid Hegarty 0–2 each, Barry Nash, William O’Donoghue, Conor Boylan, Cian Lynch, and Adam English 0–1 each	Report	Pts: Shane Bennett 2–0, Stephen Bennett 0–5 (4fs), Calum Lyons and Dessie Hutchinson (1f) 0–2 each, Paddy Leavy, Jamie Barron, Jack Prendergast, Patrick Fitzgerald, Kevin Mahony 0–1 each	Referee: M Kennedy (Tipperary); Attendance: 31,487; TV: RTÉ2

26 May 2024 Round 5	Tipperary	0–24 (24) – (27) 1–24	Clare	Thurles
16:00		(HT: 0–11 – 0–11)		Venue: Semple Stadium
	Pts: Jake Morris 0–11 (7fs), Seanie Kenneally 0–3, Ronan Maher 0–2 (1f), Eoghan Connolly and Gearoid O’Connor (2fs) 0–2 each, Barry Heffernan, Alan Tynan, Noel McGrath, and Bryan O’Mara 0–1 each	Report	Pts: Aidan McCarthy 0–9 (6fs), Diarmuid Ryan 1–1, David Fitzgerald 0–3, Mark Rodgers 0–3 (2fs), Shane O’Donnell and Tony Kelly 0–2 each, Darragh Lohan, Peter Duggan, David Reidy, Ian Galvin 0–1 each	Referee: J Murphy (Limerick); Attendance: 19,418; TV: RTÉ News (TV channel)

=== Munster final ===
9 June 2024
4:30pm
Final

Limerick	1–26 (29) – (23) 1–20	Clare
Gearóid Hegarty 1–2; Diarmaid Byrnes (3f), Aaron Gillane (4f) 0–5 each; Tom Morrissey 0–4 (1f); Declan Hannon, Kyle Hayes, David Reidy, Shane O’Brien 0–2 each; Cathal O’Neill, Adam English 0–1 each	Report	Aidan McCarthy 0–8 (6f); Peter Duggan 1–1; David Fitzgerald 0–4; Tony Kelly 0–3; Mark Rodgers 0–2 (2f); Shane O’Donnell, Ian Galvin 0–1 each

Semple Stadium
Attendance: 45,148
Referee: C Lyons (Cork)
Man of the match: Gearóid Hegarty (Limerick)
- Limerick advance to the All-Ireland semi-finals and Clare advance to the All-Ireland quarter-finals

== Cup competitions ==
=== Joe McDonagh Cup ===
==== Group stage ====
Pos	Team	Pld	W	D	L	SF	SA	Diff	Pts	Qualification
1	Laois	5	4	0	1	14–122	3–101	+54	8	Advance to Final and All-Ireland preliminary quarter-finals
2	Offaly	5	4	0	1	15–125	9–97	+46	8	Advance to Final and All-Ireland preliminary quarter-finals
3	Kerry	5	3	0	2	4–92	8–85	−5	6	
4	Westmeath	5	2	1	2	6–114	6–92	+22	5	
5	Down	5	1	1	3	11–97	10–130	−30	3	
6	Meath	5	0	0	5	5–81	19–126	-87	0	Relegated to Christy Ring Cup

==== Final ====
8 June 2024
3pm

Laois	0–26 (26) – (29) 2–23	Offaly
Aaron Dunphy 0–11 (0-6f, 0–2 65), Patrick Purcell 0–5, Aidan Corby 0–4, Fiachra C Fennell 0–1, Tomas Keyes 0–1, Liam O'Connell 0–1, James Duggan 0–1, Ian Shanahan 0–1, Ross King 0–1	Report	Brian Duignan 1–4, Eoghan Cahill 0–7 (0-5f), Charlie Mitchell 0–4, Oisin Kelly 1–0, Cillian Kiely 0–2, Killian Sampson 0–2, Cathal King 0–1, Adam Screeney 0–1, Dan Bourke 0–1, Jack Clancy 0–1

Croke Park
Referee: C McDonald (Antrim)
Man of the match: Charlie Mitchell (Offaly)

=== Christy Ring Cup (Tier 3) ===
==== Group stage ====
Pos	Team	Pld	W	D	L	SF	SA	Diff	Pts	Qualification
1	Kildare	5	5	0	0	11–116	5–65	+69	10	Advance to Final
2	Derry	5	4	0	1	8–113	4–76	+49	8	Advance to Final
3	London	5	3	0	2	13–96	6–80	+37	6	
4	Tyrone	5	2	0	3	5–78	10–110	−47	4	
5	Wicklow	5	1	0	4	4–72	7–106	−43	2	
6	Sligo	5	0	0	5	5–70	14–108	−65	0	Relegated to Nicky Rackard Cup

==== Final ====
2 June 2024 Final	Kildare	4–21 – 1–22	Derry	Croke Park
	J Sheridan 1–9 (1–0 pen, 8fs), J Burke 1–2, D Qualter 1–1, M Curtin 1–0, C Boran 0–3, S Leacy 0–2, P Dolan 0–1, C Boran 0–1, C McCabe 0–1, D Flaherty 0–1.	Report	C O’Doherty 1–11 (1–0 pen, 9fs), J Mullan 0–6, J Cassidy 0–2, C McNaughton 0–1, D McGilligan 0–1, R Mullan 0–1.

=== Nicky Rackard Cup (Tier 4) ===
==== Group stage ====
Pos	Team	Pld	W	D	L	SF	SA	Diff	Pts	Qualification
1	Donegal	5	5	0	0	9–114	4–71	58	10	Advance to Final
2	Mayo	5	3	1	1	13–105	4–81	51	7	Advance to Final
3	Roscommon	5	3	1	1	8–87	5–91	5	7	
5	Armagh	5	2	0	3	5–85	4–107	−19	4	
4	Louth	5	1	0	4	6–80	10–96	−28	2	
6	Monaghan	5	0	0	5	5–74	19–99	−67	0	Relegated to Lory Meagher Cup

==== Final ====
2 June 2024 Final	Donegal	3–17 – 0–22	Mayo	Croke Park
	J Cronolly-McGee 2–0, R Campbell 1–3, G Gilmore 0–5 (2f, 1 65’), L McKinney 0–2, D Cullen 0–2, S McVeigh 0–2, S Gillespie 0–1, P Kelly 0–1, B McIntyre 0–1.	Report	S Boland 0–9 (2f), L Lavin 0–3, S Kenny 0–3, E Delaney 0–2, C Phillips 0–1, B Douglas 0-1f, J Heraty 0–1, S Regan 0–1, A Phillips 0–1.	Referee: P Owens (Down)

=== Lory Meagher Cup ===
==== Group stage ====
Pos	Team	Pld	W	D	L	SF	SA	Diff	Pts	Qualification
1	Fermanagh	5	3	2	0	135	94	+41	8	Advance to Knockout Stage
2	Longford (Note: Longford are ranked ahead of Cavan because they won the head-to-head game between the teams.)	5	3	1	1	130	104	+26	7	Advance to Knockout Stage
3	Cavan	5	3	1	1	145	111	+34	7	
4	Leitrim	5	2	0	3	111	126	−15	4	
5	Warwickshire	5	2	0	3	100	144	−44	4	
6	Lancashire	5	0	0	5	104	146	−42	0	

==== Final ====
2 June 2024 Final	Fermanagh	3–17 – 0–22	Longford	Croke Park
	B Teehan 2–2; D McKeogh 1–4.2f; S Corrigan 0–4; L McCusker 0-31f; T Keenan 0–3; J Duffy 0–2; C Duffy, C Duffy, JP McGarry and A Flanagan 0–1, each;	Report	C Darcy 0–13,12f; J Rabbitt 1–1; D Buckley 1–1; E Tully 0–2; C Mullane 0–2; P Lynam 0–1;	Referee: J Judge (Mayo)

== All-Ireland Senior Hurling Championship ==
=== Bracket ===
Teams in bold advanced to the next round. The provincial champions are marked by an asterisk.

**Preliminary quarter-finals** 15 June
Laois	0–20
**Wexford**	**0–32**
Offaly	3–19
**Cork**	**4–25**

**Quarter-finals**; 22 June
**Clare**	**2–28**
Wexford	1–19
Dublin	0–21
**Cork**	**0–26**

**Semi-finals**; 6 / 7 July
Kilkenny*	2–16
**Clare**	**0–24**
Limerick*	0–29
**Cork**	**1–28**

**All-Ireland Final**; 21 July
**Clare** (a.e.t.)	**3–29**
Cork	1–34

=== Preliminary quarter-finals ===
15 June 2024 Preliminary quarter-final	**Laois**	0–20 (20) – (32) 0–32	**Wexford**	Portlaoise
5pm		(HT: 0–11 – 0–18)		Venue: O'Moore Park
	Pts: Aaron Dunphy 0–15 (12fs, 1 65), Stephen Maher 0–2, Aidan Corby 0–1, Cody Comerford 0–1, Ryan Mulamey 0–1	Report	Pts: Lee Chin 0–11 (5fs, 2 65s), Conor McDonald 0–5, Cian Byrne 0–3, Liam Og McGovern 0–3, Conor Hearne 0–3, Seamus Casey 0–2 (2fs), Tomas Kinsella 0–1, Simon Donohoe 0–1, Damien Reck 0–1, Rory O'Connor 0–1, Corey Dunbar Byrne 0–1	Referee: S Hynes (Galway)

15 June 2024 Preliminary quarter-final	**Offaly**	3–19 (28) – (37) 4–25	**Cork**	Tullamore
5:15pm		(HT: 0–13 – 2–15)		Venue: O'Connor Park
	Pts: Killian Sampson 1–3, Eoghan Cahill 0–5 (4fs), Brian Duignan 0–5 (3fs), Oisin Kelly 1–0, Jack Clancy 1–0, Dan Bourke 0–2, David King 0–1, Cillian Kiely 0–1, Charlie Mitchell 0–1, Jason Sampson 0–1	Report	Pts: Pat Horgan 1–10 (7fs, 2 65s), Shane Barrett 1–4, Brian Hayes 1–1, Declan Dalton 0–4 (1f), Robbie O'Flynn 1–0, Darragh Fitzgibbon 0–3, Niall O'Leary 0–1, Conor Lehane 0–1, Shane Kingston 0–1	Referee: S Stack (Dublin); Attendance: 16,212; TV: GAAGO

=== Quarter-finals ===
22 June 2024 Quarter-final	**Dublin**	0–21 (21) – (26) 0–26	**Cork**	Thurles
1:15pm		(HT: 0–10 – 0–15)		Venue: Semple Stadium
	Pts: Seán Currie 0–7 (4fs), Conor Burke 0–4; Chris Crummey, Donal Burke (1f) 0–3 each, Brian Hayes 0–2, Darragh Power and Paddy Doyle 0–1 each	Report	Pts: Patrick Horgan 0–10 (7fs) Declan Dalton 0–6 (3fs) Darragh Fitzgibbon, Shane Barrett, Séamus Harnedy, Robbie O’Flynn 0–2 each; Brian Hayes, Luke Meade 0–1 each	Referee: M Kennedy (Tipperary); Attendance: 30,509; TV: RTÉ One

22 June 2024 Quarter-final	**Clare**	2–28 (34) – (22) 1–19	**Wexford**	Thurles
3:15pm		(HT: 0–15 – 1–10)		Venue: Semple Stadium
	Pts: Shane O’Donnell 1–4, Mark Rodgers 0-6f, Tony Kelly 0–6 (1f), Ian Galvin 1–1, David Reidy 0–3, David Fitzgerald 0–2, Diarmuid Ryan 0–2, Aron Shanagher 0–1, Conor Leen 0–1, Shane Meehan 0–1, Aidan McCarthy 0–1 (65)	Report	Pts: Lee Chin 1–6 (1–0 pen, 5fs), Conor Foley 0–3 (1 sideline), Rory O’Connor 0–2, Cian Byrne 0–2, Mark Fanning 0–1 (f), Conor McDonald 0–1, Conor Hearne 0–1, Cathal Dunbar 0–1, Kevin Foley 0–1, Séamus Casey 0–1	Referee: J Murphy (Limerick); Attendance: 30,509; TV: RTÉ One

=== Semi-finals ===
6 July 2024 Semi-final	**Kilkenny**	2–16 (22) – (24) 0–24	**Clare**	Dublin
3pm		(HT: 1–10 – 0–8)		Venue: Croke Park
	Pts: TJ Reid 0–7 (4fs, 1 65, 1 sideline), Billy Ryan 1–2, Eoin Cody 1–0, John Donnelly and Cian Kenny 0–2 each, David Blanchfield, Mikey Carey, and Paddy Deegan 0–1 each	Report	Pts: Aidan McCarthy 0–11 (9fs), David Reidy and Tony Kelly 0–3 each, Mark Rodgers and David Fitzgerald 0–2 each, Shane O’Donnell, Ian Galvin, and Peter Duggan 0–1 each	Referee: L Gordon (Galway); Attendance: 39,241; TV: RTÉ One / BBC NI

7 July 2024 Semi-final	**Limerick**	0–29 (29) – (31) 1–28	**Cork**	Dublin
4pm		(HT: 0–16 – 1–11)		Venue: Croke Park
	Pts: Aaron Gillane 0–10 (4fs), David Reidy, Cathal O’Neill, and Diarmaid Byrnes (2fs) 0–3 each, Tom Morrissey, Shane O’Brien, and Adam English 0–2 each, Kyle Hayes, Cian Lynch, Gearóid Hegarty, and Séamus Flanagan 0–1 each	Report	Pts: Brian Hayes 1–4, Patrick Horgan 0–5 (4fs), Séamus Harnedy and Declan Dalton (2fs) 0–4 each, Darragh Fitzgibbon, Shane Barrett, and Alan Connolly 0–3 each, Rob Downey and Mark Coleman 0–1 each	Referee: T Walsh (Waterford); Attendance: 82,300; TV: RTÉ2 / BBC NI

=== Final ===
RTÉ 2
BBC Two

21 July 2024
15:30 IST (UTC+01:00)
Final

Report

Clare	3–29 (38) – (37) 1–34 (a.e.t.)	Cork
(HT: 1–12 – 1–12) (FT: 3–21 – 1–27)
Gls: A McCarthy 1, T Kelly 1, M Rodgers 1 Pts: A McCarthy 7 (3fs, 1 '65'), T Kelly 4, M Rodgers 3, D Ryan 3, D Fitzgerald 3, P Duggan 2 (1s/l), D Reidy 2, S O'Donnell 2, R Taylor 1, I Galvin 1, S Meehan 1		Gls: R Downey 1 Pts: P Horgan 12 (10fs), S Harnedy 4, T O'Mahony 4, M Coleman 3, B Hayes 2, S Barrett 2, D Fitzgibbon 2, S Kingston 2, E Downey 1, A Connolly 1, C Joyce 1, R O'Flynn 1

Croke Park, Dublin
Referee: Johnny Murphy (Limerick)
Attendance: 82,300

== Stadia and locations ==
Locations of the 2024 All-Ireland SHC teams.
Red: Munster SHC; Green: Leinster SHC; Blue: Joe McDonagh Cup.

County	Location	Province	Stadium	Capacity
Antrim	Belfast	Ulster	Corrigan Park	3,700
Carlow	Carlow	Leinster	Dr Cullen Park	11,000
Clare	Ennis	Munster	Cusack Park	19,000
Cork	Cork	Munster	Páirc Uí Chaoimh	45,300
Down	Ballycran	Ulster	McKenna Park	1,320
Dublin	Dublin	Leinster	Croke Park (neutral)	82,300
Dublin	Donnycarney	Leinster	Parnell Park (official home venue)	7,300
Galway	Galway	Connacht	Pearse Stadium	26,197
Kerry	Tralee	Munster	Austin Stack Park	12,000
Kilkenny	Kilkenny	Leinster	Nowlan Park	27,000
Laois	Portlaoise	Leinster	O'Moore Park	22,000
Limerick	Limerick	Munster	Gaelic Grounds	44,023
Meath	Navan	Leinster	Páirc Tailteann	11,000
Offaly	Tullamore	Leinster	O'Connor Park	18,000
Tipperary	Thurles	Munster	Semple Stadium	45,690
Waterford	Waterford	Munster	Walsh Park	11,046
Westmeath	Mullingar	Leinster	Cusack Park	11,500
Wexford	Wexford	Leinster	Chadwicks Wexford Park	18,000

== Statistics ==
=== Top scorers ===
==== Overall ====
A theme of the 2024 championship, as in previous years, was the ongoing individual battle for the top championship scorer of all time between Patrick Horgan and T. J. Reid. Horgan's haul of 12 points in the final against Clare made him the top scorer for 2024 and also brought his career tally to 716, overtaking Reid's current career total of 706.

Rank	Player	County	Tally	Total	Matches	Average
1	Patrick Horgan	Cork	5–74	89	8	11
2	Lee Chin	Wexford	4–71	83	7	11
3	Donal Burke	Dublin	2–62	68	7	9
4	Aidan McCarthy	Clare	2–61	67	8	8
5	T. J. Reid	Kilkenny	4–53	65	7	9
6	Martin Kavanagh	Carlow	1–46	49	5	9
7	Aaron Gillane	Limerick	2–42	48	6	8
8	Mark Rodgers	Clare	2–28	34	8	4
8	Evan Niland	Galway	0–32	32	5	6
9	Conal Cunning	Antrim	2–25	31	5	6
9	Conor Cooney	Galway	2–25	31	5	6
11	Tony Kelly	Clare	2–20	26	7	4
12	Stephen Bennett	Waterford	4–13	25	4	6
13	Dessie Hutchinson	Waterford	0–24	24	4	6
13	Rory O'Connor	Wexford	1–21	24	7	3
15	Alan Connolly	Cork	4-09	21	6	3

==== In a single game ====
Rank	Player	County	Tally	Total	Opposition
1	Lee Chin	Wexford	2–11	17	Antrim
2	Patrick Horgan	Cork	2–10	16	Clare
3	Lee Chin	Wexford	1–12	15	Dublin
4	Aidan McCarthy	Clare	1–10	13	Limerick
4	Conor Cooney	Galway	1–10	13	Carlow
4	Martin Kavanagh	Carlow	0–13	13	Dublin
7	Séamus Flanagan	Limerick	3-03	12	Cork
7	T. J. Reid	Kilkenny	2-06	12	Dublin
7	Patrick Horgan	Cork	0–12	12	Clare
10	Aaron Gillane	Limerick	1-08	11	Tipperary
10	Lee Chin	Wexford	0–11	11	Galway
10	Evan Niland	Galway	0–11	11	Wexford
10	Aidan McCarthy	Clare	0–11	11	Kilkenny
14	Aidan McCarthy	Clare	1-07	10	Cork
14	Aidan McCarthy	Clare	0–10	10	Cork
14	Dessie Hutchinson	Waterford	0–10	10	Cork
14	Aaron Gillane	Limerick	0–10	10	Cork

=== Scoring events ===
- Widest winning margin: 32 points
  - Kilkenny 5–30 – 0–13 Antrim (Leinster SHC)
- Most goals in a match: 8
  - Fermanagh 5–12 – 3–18 Cavan (Lory Meagher Cup)
  - Meath 1–16 – 7–29 Laois (Joe McDonagh Cup)
  - Meath 3–16 – 5–31 Offaly (Joe McDonagh Cup)
  - Lancashire 2–24 – 6–22 Warwickshire (Lory Meagher Cup)
  - Down 3–25 – 5–23 Offaly (Joe McDonagh Cup)
- Most points in a match: 57
  - Limerick 0–29 – 1–28 Cork (All-Ireland semi-final)
- Most goals by one team in a match: 7
  - Meath 1–16 – 7–29 Laois (Joe McDonagh Cup)
  - Leitrim 0–18 – 7–19 Cavan
- Most points by one team in a match: 36
  - Carlow 1–13 – 2–36 Wexford (Leinster SHC)
- Highest aggregate score: 72 points
  - Down 3–25 – 5–23 Offaly (Joe McDonagh Cup)
- Lowest aggregate score: 29 points
  - Wicklow 0–12 – 0–17 Derry (Christy Ring Cup)

== Miscellaneous ==
- Limerick become the first ever county to win 6 consecutive Munster titles.
- Nickie Quaid, Declan Hannon, Graeme Mulcahy and David Reidy became the first Limerick players to win seven Munster Championship medals.
- Clare become the third ever team to lose 3 consecutive Munster finals.
- Kilkenny failed to win the All-Ireland for the ninth year in a row, equalling their title droughts of 1923–31 and 1948–56.
- By beating Limerick in the All-Ireland semi final, Cork became the first hurling team to end a five in a row attempt since Tipperary beat Kilkenny in the 2010 All-Ireland final. Previously Tipperary ended Cork's attempt of winning a five in a row during the Munster championship of 1945.
- Cork's 19th year in a row without an All-Ireland senior title, their longest dry spell since the founding of the championship.

== Live televised games ==
RTÉ, the national broadcaster in Ireland, provided the majority of the live television coverage of the hurling championship.

For the second year, GAAGO also broadcast matches in Ireland with nine games to be shown exclusively on its pay streaming service.

== Awards ==
Sunday Game Team of the Year

The Sunday Game team of the year was picked 21 July on the night of the final. The panel consisting of Jackie Tyrrell, Brendan Cummins, Anthony Daly, Joe Canning, Shane Dowling, and Ursula Jacob also chose Shane O'Donnell as the Sunday game player of the year.

- Nickie Quaid (Limerick)
- Adam Hogan (Clare)
- Eoin Downey (Cork)
- Conor Leen (Clare)
- David McInerney (Clare)
- Robert Downey (Cork)
- Kyle Hayes (Limerick)
- Tony Kelly (Clare)
- Darragh Fitzgibbon (Cork)
- David Fitzgerald (Clare)
- Shane Barrett (Cork)
- Seamus Harnedy (Cork)
- Mark Rodgers (Clare)
- Shane O'Donnell (Clare)
- Brian Hayes (Cork)

All Star Team of the Year

On 1 November, the All-Star winners were announced. The awards ceremony was held at the RDS. Shane O'Donnell was named as the GAA/GPA Hurler of the Year with Adam Hogan named as the GAA/GPA Young Hurler of the Year.

Pos.	Player	Team	Appearances
GK	Nickie Quaid	Limerick	3
RCB	Adam Hogan^{YHOTY}	Clare	1
FB	Eoin Downey	Cork	1
LCB	Dan Morrissey	Limerick	4
RWB	David McInerney	Clare	2
CB	Robert Downey	Cork	1
LWB	Kyle Hayes	Limerick	5
MD	Tony Kelly	Clare	5
MD	Darragh Fitzgibbon	Cork	2
RWF	David Fitzgerald	Clare	2
CF	Shane Barrett	Cork	1
LWF	Seamus Harnedy	Cork	3
RCF	Gearóid Hegarty	Limerick	4
FF	Shane O'Donnell^{HOTY}	Clare	3
LCF	Mark Rodgers	Clare	1

== See also ==
- 2024 Leinster Senior Hurling Championship
- 2024 Munster Senior Hurling Championship
- 2024 Joe McDonagh Cup (Tier 2)
- 2024 Christy Ring Cup (Tier 3)
- 2024 Nicky Rackard Cup (Tier 4)
- 2024 Lory Meagher Cup (Tier 5)
- 2024 All-Ireland Senior Football Championship
