= Clare county hurling team =

Irish hurling team

Clare
- Sport: Hurling
- Irish: An Clár
- Nickname(s): Banner men
- County board: Clare GAA
- Manager: Brian Lohan (Wolfe Tones)
- Captain: Tony Kelly (Ballyea)
- Home venue(s): Cusack Park, Ennis

Recent competitive record
- Current All-Ireland status: SF in 2026
- Last championship title: 2024
- Current NHL Division: 1B (1st in 2026; promoted to Division 1A)
- Last league title: 2024
First colours

The Clare county hurling team represents Clare in hurling and is governed by Clare GAA, the county board of the Gaelic Athletic Association. The team competes in the three major annual inter-county competitions - the All-Ireland Senior Hurling Championship, the Munster Senior Hurling Championship and the National Hurling League.

Clare's home ground is Cusack Park, Ennis. The team's manager is Brian Lohan of the Wolfe Tones, Shannon, club.

The team last won the Munster Senior Championship in 1998, the All-Ireland Senior Championship in 2024 and the National League in 2024.

== History ==
Clare has won the Munster Senior Hurling Championship (SHC) on six occasions and the All-Ireland Senior Hurling Championship (SHC) on five occasions.

=== 1889–1932: First All-Ireland SHC title ===
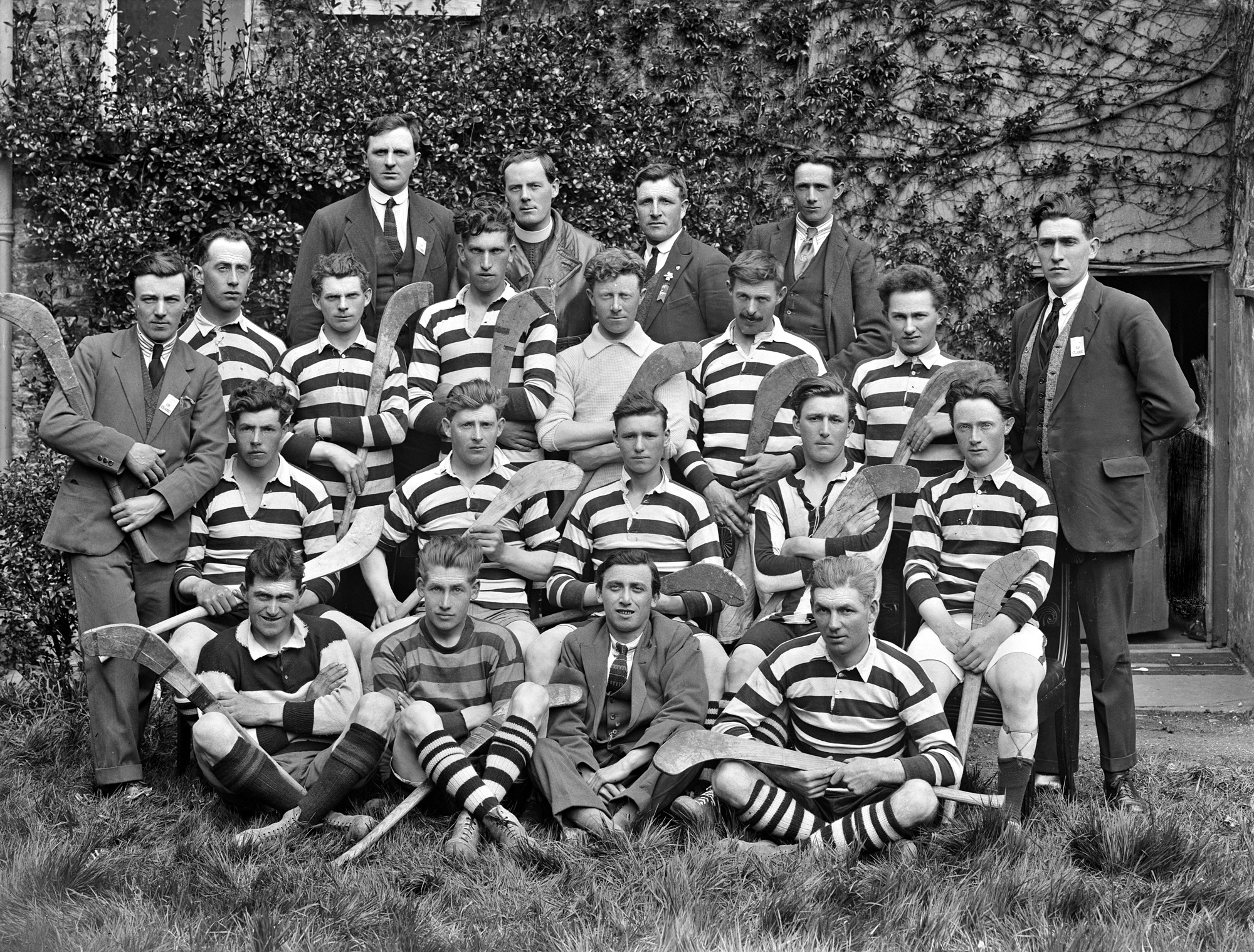
An early Clare hurling team

In 1889, Clare won its first Munster SHC title after receiving a walkover from Kerry in the final. Clare contested the 1889 All-Ireland Senior Hurling Championship Final, but lost to Dublin by a scoreline of 5–1 to 1–6.

Clare won a second Munster SHC title in 1914, defeating Cork by a scoreline of 3–2 to 3–1. Clare then defeated Galway in the All-Ireland semi-final by 6–6 to 0–0 to reach the 1914 All-Ireland Senior Hurling Championship final. In that game Clare defeated Laois by a scoreline of 2–04 to 1–02, with Amby Power becoming the first man to captain Clare to an All-Ireland hurling title.

Clare won another Munster SHC title in 1932, defeating Cork on a scoreline of 5–2 to 4–1. The team contested the 1932 All-Ireland Senior Hurling Championship final, but lost to Kilkenny by a scoreline of 3–3 to 2–3.

=== 1995–2000: Second and third All-Ireland SHC titles ===
After losing Munster SHC finals in 1993 and 1994, Len Gaynor was replaced as manager by Ger Loughnane, from Feakle. Clare made a return to the Munster SHC final in 1995 after a 2–13 to 3–9 victory over Cork in the semi-final. In the closing minutes of that game, Cork were leading by two points, at which point Clare earned a sideline, which was taken by Fergie Tuohy. It travelled to the edge of the square, where Ollie Baker doubled on the sliotar, scoring a goal, to send Clare through to the decider. In the final, Clare faced Limerick. Clare dominated the game and easily won, by a scoreline of 1–17 to 0–11. This was Clare's first Munster SHC title in 63 years. In the All-Ireland SHC semi-final, Clare played Galway. 2–1 from Ger 'Sparrow' O'Loughlin and 0–7 from Jamesie O'Connor helped Clare through to the final by a scoreline of 3–12 to 1–13. Offaly, the reigning All-Ireland SHC champions, awaited Clare in that game. In the second half, an Anthony Daly free rebounded off the post and fell to Éamonn Taaffe at the edge of the square; Taaffe sent the ball into the back of the Offaly net. Clare won by a scoreline of 1–13 to 2–8 to secure a first All-Ireland SHC in 81 years.

In 1996, Limerick defeated Clare in the opening round of the Munster SHC by a scoreline of 1–13 to 0–15. This ended Clare's participation in that year's competition.

In 1997, Clare defeated Kerry and Cork to qualify for a Munster SHC final against Tipperary. That game was held in Páirc Uí Chaoimh, Cork and Clare won a close match by a scoreline of 1–18 to 0–18. Clare then defeated Kilkenny by a scoreline of 1–17 to 1–13 in the All-Ireland SHC semi-final. In the subsequent All-Ireland SHC final, Clare faced Tipperary, an opponent that had advanced through "the back door" to reach the final. A late Tipperary goal gave that team the lead but, entering the closing stages, the teams were tied at 2–13 to 0–19. Jamesie O'Connor then scored a point that was enough to win Clare the All-Ireland SHC title. He finished the game with 0–7 and later won the All Stars Hurler of the Year award.

In 1998, Clare retained the Munster SHC title. The team defeated Cork by a scoreline of 0–21 to 0–13 to qualify for the final, where they faced Waterford. A late goal from a Paul Flynn free tied the game at 1–16 to 3–10 and sent it to a replay. Clare won the replay by a scoreline of 2–16 to 0–10. Clare faced Offaly in the 1998 All-Ireland SHC semi-final. That game ended in a draw, 1–13 apiece. In the replay Clare were leading in the closing stages by a scoreline of 2–10 to 1–16; however the referee accidentally blew the match up early. Disarray engulfed Croke Park as disgruntled Offaly supporters began a sit-down protest on the pitch. As the full 70 minutes had not been completed, the semi-final had to be replayed. On this occasion, Offaly won by a scoreline of 0–16 to 0–13.

Clare defeated Tipperary to qualify for the 1999 Munster SHC final, setting up the chance for Clare to win a third successive Munster SHC title. However, Cork won by a scoreline of 1–15 to 0–14. In the All-Ireland SHC quarter-final, Clare defeated Galway (after a replay) by a scoreline of 3–18 to 2–14. In the All-Ireland SHC semi-final, Kilkenny defeated Clare by a scoreline of 2–14 to 1–13.

Tipperary defeated Clare in the 2000 Munster SHC semi-final by a scoreline of 2–19 to 1–14. This was Ger Loughnane's last match as Clare manager.

=== 2012–2016: Fourth All-Ireland SHC title ===
In 2012, Davy Fitzgerald began his tenure as Clare manager. At that time Clare had not won a championship match since 2008 and the team was also in the second tier of the National Hurling League. Clare won Division 1B of the league to gain promotion for the following year. In the Munster SHC, Clare lost to Waterford by a scoreline of 2–17 to 1–18. Clare then faced Dublin in a 2012 All-Ireland Senior Hurling Championship qualifier. In what was Tony Kelly's first senior game for the county, he scored 1–02 to help Clare win by a scoreline of 1–16 to 0–16. In the next round Limerick defeated Clare by a scoreline of 3-18 to 1-20.

In the 2013 season, Clare defeated Waterford in the Munster SHC quarter-final by a scoreline of 2–20 to 1–15, outscoring them by 2–12 to 0–6 in the second half. This was the first time Clare had won a Munster SHC game since 2008. In the Munster SHC semi-final, Cork defeated Clare by a scoreline of 0–23 to 0–15. Clare then defeated Laois and Wexford in the 2013 All-Ireland SHC qualifiers. Thus Clare advanced to an All-Ireland SHC quarter-final against Galway, winning that game by a scoreline of by 1–23 to 2–14. Munster SHC winner Limerick awaited Clare in the All-Ireland SHC semi-final. An early Darach Honan goal helped Clare win by a scoreline of 1–22 to 0–18 and qualify for a first All-Ireland SHC final since 2002. The 2013 All-Ireland Senior Hurling Championship Final was held on 8 September and Clare led at half-time. In the second half Cork scored three goals to get back into the game. With the sides level, Patrick Horgan scored to put Cork into the lead. Moments later, in injury-time, Domhnall O'Donovan pointed to send the game to a replay, the full-time score being 3–16 to 0–25. On 28 September 2013, Clare won the replay by a scoreline of 5–16 to 3–16. Shane O'Donnell scored 3–3 of Clare's total in that game. A Conor McGrath goal in the 61st minute was quickly followed by three points to put Clare 4–16 to 2–16 ahead. A late Stephen Moylan goal was cancelled out by a Darach Honan goal and Clare won by a scoreline of 5–16 to 3–16. Clare's centre-forward, Tony Kelly, was awarded both the All Stars Young Hurler of the Year and All Stars Hurler of the Year awards.

Clare lost the 2014 Munster SHC semi-final to Cork by a scoreline of 2–23 to 2–18. In round 1 of the 2014 All-Ireland SHC qualifiers, 14-man Clare drew 2–25 apiece with Wexford. In the replay at Wexford Park, despite being down to 13 men, Clare forced the game to extra-time before losing by a scoreline of 2–25 to 2–22. Clare hurling was dealt a further blow at the end of 2014 when the Cratloe trio of Podge Collins, Sean Collins, and Cathal McInerney announced they would focus on football the following year.

2015 began tumultuously, with two players (Davy O'Halloran and Nicky O'Connell), oping to leave the panel over their belief that they had been subjected to unfair disciplinary action. On the field of play, Clare lost four of its five league group stage matches before being relegated to Division 1B, after losing a play-off to Kilkenny by a scoreline of 1–18 to 1–17. Clare also lost its Munster SHC first round game to Limerick, by a scoreline of 1–19 to 2–15. A comprehensive 3–26 to 0–15 win over Offaly sent Clare through to round 2 of the 2015 All-Ireland SHC qualifiers, where Cork won by a scoreline of 0–20 to 0–17.

Clare won the 2016 National Hurling League in May that year, a first since 1978 after a 1–23 to 2–19 win against Waterford in a replay.

=== 2016–: Fifth All-Ireland SHC title ===
On 21 July 2024, Clare won the All-Ireland SHC final against Cork by 3–29 to 1–34 after extra-time, claiming a fifth All-Ireland SHC title and a first in 11 years.

== Support ==
There exists a supporters' club called Club Clare, which was established in 2017.

Club Clare is not linked to a supporters' club that existed during Davy Fitzgerald's time as manager between 2012 and 2016. Fitzgerald established that club and was involved in its running. Clare GAA told the Sunday Independent in 2021 that it did not have the accounts of that club and that the club (and similar supporters' clubs) had "nothing to do with" the county board. This contradicted Fitzgerald, who wrote in his 2018 book At All Costs: "Every single cent raised was accounted for, every detail presented to the audit committee. And that's what makes my blood boil when, even to this day, some smart-asses toss out that lazy question, 'Where did all the money go?' about the Supporters' Club in Clare. Open your eyes. Ask the audit committee. Ask the county board". During the 2020 championship meeting between Clare and Wexford (then being managed by Fitzgerald), Fitzgerald had an exchange with a member of the Clare backroom team. Fitzgerald said afterwards: "I had to endure criticism from an unnamed individual who was seated in the stand", describing it as abuse and asking Clare's county board to investigate. The man later identified himself as kitman Niall Romer, who said: "I asked the question, where was the money that was raised in America? Where was the money from the Supporters' Club? And it got a reaction. There was no abuse, I asked a question, and when I got a reaction I kept asking the question... He didn't know where it was coming from at first. After that he realised and shut up". Romer said he had decided to ask the question himself (provoked, he said, by a delay in the release of the Wexford team sheet ahead of the game) and that it had not been a tactic of manager Brian Lohan.

== Panel ==
Clare squad vs Kilkenny in the All-Ireland SHC semi-final at Croke Park on 2 July 2022

No.	Player	Position	Club
1	Éibhear Quilligan	Goalkeeper	Feakle
2	Rory Hayes	Right corner-back	Wolfe Tones, Shannon
3	Conor Cleary	Full-back	Kilmaley
4	Paul Flanagan	Left corner-back	Ballyea
5	Diarmuid Ryan	Right half-back	Cratloe
6	John Conlon	Centre-back	Clonlara
7	David McInerney	Left half-back	Tulla
8	David Fitzgerald	Midfield	Inagh-Kilnamona
9	David Reidy	Midfield	Éire Óg, Ennis
10	Cathal Malone	Right half-forward	Sixmilebridge
11	Tony Kelly (c)	Centre-forward	Ballyea
12	Shane O'Donnell	Left half-forward	Éire Óg, Ennis
13	Ian Galvin	Right corner-forward	Clonlara
14	Peter Duggan	Full-forward	Clooney-Quin
15	Ryan Taylor	Left corner-forward	Clooney-Quin

No.	Player	Position	Club
16	Éamonn Foudy	Substitute	Inagh-Kilnamona
17	Paudie Fitzpatrick	Substitute	Sixmilebridge
18	Aron Shanagher	Substitute	Wolfe Tones, Shannon
19	Shane Meehan	Substitute	The Banner, Ennis
20	Aaron Fitzgerald	Substitute	Éire Óg, Ennis
21	Shane Golden	Substitute	Sixmilebridge
22	Darragh Lohan	Substitute	Wolfe Tones, Shannon
23	Cian Nolan	Substitute	Smith O'Brien's, Killaloe
24	Jack Browne	Substitute	Ballyea
25	Domhnall McMahon	Substitute	Tubber
26	Mark Rodgers	Substitute	Scariff

== Management team ==
Appointed on a two-year term, with optional third year, in October 2019; extended in 2023; extended by a further three years in July 2025:

- Manager: Brian Lohan
- Selectors: Ken Ralph, James Moran
- Coaches: Seán Treacy, Rory Gantley

== Managerial history ==
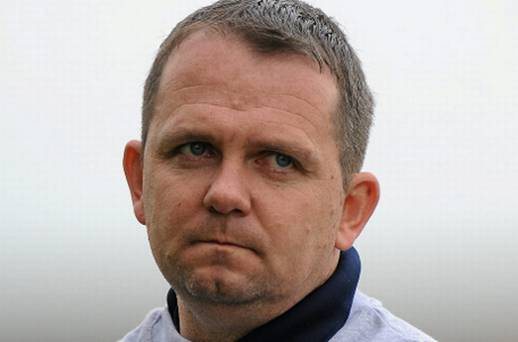
Davy Fitzgerald managed Clare to its fourth All-Ireland SHC title in 2013, having played as goalkeeper in the team's second and third wins in 1995 and 1997.

Dates	Name	Origin	Provincial titles	National titles	International titles	Championship record
1970–1976	Fr. Harry Bohan	Feakle	—N/a	1971 NHL Division 2	—N/a	P11; W3 D1 L7
1977–1980	Fr. Harry Bohan	Feakle		1977 NHL; 1978 NHL		P9; W4 D1 L4
1977–1980	Justin McCarthy	Passage West (Cork)		1977 NHL; 1978 NHL		P9; W4 D1 L4
1981–1983	Fr. Harry Bohan	Feakle	—N/a	1981 NHL Division 2	—N/a	P5; W2 D0 L3
1984–1985	Éamonn Cregan	Claughaun (Limerick)	—N/a	1985 NHL Division 2	—N/a	P4; W1 D1 L2
1986–1989	Séamus Durack	Éire Óg, Ennis	—N/a	—N/a	—N/a	P8; W3 D1 L4
1990–1994	Len Gaynor	Kilruane MacDonagh's (Tipperary)	—N/a	1990 NHL Division 2; 1994 NHL Division 2	—N/a	P10; W4 D1 L5
1995–2000	Ger Loughnane	Feakle	1995 Munster Senior Hurling Championship; 1997 Munster Senior Hurling Championship; 1998 Munster Senior Hurling Championship	1995 All-Ireland Senior Hurling Championship; 1997 All-Ireland Senior Hurling Championship	—N/a	P23; W14 D4 L5
2001–2003	Cyril Lyons	Ruan	—N/a	—N/a	—N/a	P10; W5 D0 L5
2004–2006	Anthony Daly	Clarecastle	—N/a	—N/a	—N/a	P17; W10 D1 L6
2007–2007	Tony Considine	Cratloe	—N/a	—N/a	—N/a	P5; W3 D0 L2
2008–2009	Mike McNamara	Scariff	2009 WCC	—N/a	—N/a	P7; W3 D0 L4
2010–2011	Ger 'Sparrow' O'Loughlin	Clarecastle	—N/a	—N/a	—N/a	P4; W0 D0 L4
2012–2016	Davy Fitzgerald	Sixmilebridge	2013 WCC; 2016 MSHL	2012 NHL Division 2; 2013 All-Ireland Senior Hurling Championship; 2016 NHL Division 2; 2016 NHL	—N/a	P21; W10 D2 L9
2017–2019	Gerry O'Connor	Éire Óg, Ennis	2019 MSHL		2017 Fenway Hurling Classic	P15; W7 D1 L7
2017–2019	Donal Moloney	Scariff	2019 MSHL		2017 Fenway Hurling Classic	P15; W7 D1 L7
2020–	Brian Lohan	Wolfe Tones, Shannon	—N/a	2024 NHL; 2024 All-Ireland Senior Hurling Championship; 2026 NHL Division 1B	—N/a	P40; W22 D2 L16 as of 5 July 2026

== Competitive record ==
This is Clare's record in All-Ireland SHC finals.

#	Date	Opponent	Result	Clare captain	Man of the Match	Venue	W/D/L
1	3 November 1889	Dublin	1–6 : 5–1	John Considine		Inchicore	L
2	18 October 1914	Laois	5–1 : 1–0	Amby Power		Croke Park	W
3	4 September 1932	Kilkenny	2–3 : 3–3	John Joe 'Goggles' Doyle		Croke Park	L
4	3 September 1995	Offaly	1–13 : 2–8	Anthony Daly	Seánie McMahon	Croke Park	W
5	14 September 1997	Tipperary	0–20 : 2–13	Anthony Daly	Jamesie O'Connor	Croke Park	W
6	8 September 2002	Kilkenny	0–19 : 2–20	Brian Lohan	Henry Shefflin (Kilkenny)	Croke Park	L
7	8 September 2013	Cork	0–25 : 3–16	Patrick Donnellan	Conor Ryan	Croke Park	D
R	28 September 2013	Cork	5–16 : 3–16	Patrick Donnellan	Shane O'Donnell	Croke Park	W
8	21 July 2024	Cork	3–29 : 1–34	Tony Kelly	Tony Kelly	Croke Park	W

== Players ==
=== Notable players ===
- Jamesie O'Connor

=== All Stars ===
Since the All-Stars began in 1971, 34 Clare players have amassed a total of 63 All-Star Awards.

All Stars
Awards	Players
5	Tony Kelly (2013, 2020, 2021, 2022, 2024)
4	Jamesie O'Connor (1995, 1997, 1998, 2001); Brian Lohan (1995, 1996, 1997, 2002)
3	Séamus Durack (1977, 1978, 1981); Anthony Daly (1994, 1995, 1998); Seánie McMahon (1995, 1997, 1998); Davy Fitzgerald (1995, 2002, 2005); Shane O'Donnell (2022, 2023, 2024)
2	Ger Loughnane (1974, 1977); John McMahon (1976, 1977); John Callinan (1979, 1981); Liam Doyle (1995, 1997); Ger 'Sparrow' O'Loughlin (1995, 1997); Ollie Baker (1995, 1998); Colin Lynch (1997, 2002); Brendan Bugler (2012, 2013); John Conlon (2018, 2023); David McInerney (2013, 2024); David Fitzgerald (2022, 2024); Peter Duggan (2018, 2026);
1	Mick Moroney (1977); Noel Casey (1978); Colm Honan (1978); Seán Stack (1981); Niall Gilligan (1999); Frank Lohan (1999); Tony Griffin (2006); Podge Collins (2013); Patrick Donnellan (2013); Colm Galvin (2013); Conor McGrath (2013); Conor Ryan (2013); Adam Hogan (2024); Mark Rodgers (2024)

Hurler of the Year
All-Stars HOTY	Brian Lohan (1995); Jamesie O'Connor (1997); Tony Kelly (2013); Shane O'Donnell (2024)
Texaco HOTY	Seánie McMahon (1995); Jamesie O'Connor (1997); Tony Kelly (2013)
Under-21 HOTY	Darach Honan (2009); Séadna Morey (2012); David McInerney (2013); Colm Galvin (2014)
Young HOTY	Tony Kelly (2013), Mark Rodgers (2023); Adam Hogan (2024)

Since the foundation of the Under-21 All-Star Awards in 2013, 14 Clare players have amassed 17 awards.

U-21 All Stars
Awards	Players
2	Colm Galvin (2013, 2014); Tony Kelly (2013, 2014); Séadna Morey (2013, 2014)
1	Podge Collins (2013); Paul Flanagan (2013); David McInerney (2013); Alan O'Neill (2013); Ronan Taaffe (2013); Conor Cleary (2014); Aaron Cunningham (2014); Eoin Enright (2014); Jamie Shanahan (2014); Bobby Duggan (2015); Ian Galvin (2015)

== Honours ==
=== National ===
- All-Ireland Senior Hurling Championship
  - (gold) Winners (5): 1914, 1995, 1997, 2013, 2024
  - (silver) Runners-up (3): 1889, 1932, 2002
- National Hurling League
  - (gold) Winners (5): 1945–46, 1976–77, 1977–78, 2016, 2024
  - (silver) Runners-up (7): 1975–76, 1984–85, 1986–87, 1994–95, 2001, 2005, 2020
- National Hurling League Division 1B
  - (gold) Winners (1): 2026
- National Hurling League Division 2
  - (gold) Winners (7): 1971, 1981, 1985, 1990, 1994, 2012, 2016
- All-Ireland Intermediate Hurling Championship
  - (gold) Winners (1): 2011
  - (silver) Runners-up (1): 2016
- All-Ireland Under-20 Hurling Championship
  - (gold) Winners (5): 2009, 2012, 2013, 2014, 2026
- All-Ireland Junior Hurling Championship
  - (gold) Winners (2): 1914, 1993
  - (silver) Runners-up (2): 1949, 1995
- All-Ireland Minor Hurling Championship
  - (gold) Winners (2): 1997, 2023
  - (silver) Runners-up (3): 1989, 2010, 2025

=== Provincial ===
- Munster Senior Hurling Championship
  - (gold) Winners (6): 1889, 1914, 1932, 1995, 1997, 1998
  - (silver) Runners-up (24): 1899, 1901, 1915, 1918, 1927, 1928, 1930, 1938, 1955, 1967, 1972, 1974, 1977, 1978, 1981, 1986, 1993, 1994, 1999, 2008, 2017, 2018, 2022, 2023, 2024
- Waterford Crystal Cup
  - (gold) Winners (2): 2009, 2013
  - (silver) Runners-up (2): 2012, 2014
- Munster Senior Hurling League
  - (gold) Winners (2): 2016, 2019
  - (silver) Runners-up (1): 2018
- Munster Intermediate Hurling Championship
  - (gold) Winners (2): 2011, 2016
  - (silver) Runners-up (3): 1963, 2001, 2012
- Munster Junior Hurling Championship
  - (gold) Winners (4): 1914, 1949, 1993, 1995

=== Other ===
- Players Champions Cup
  - (gold) Winners (1): 2017
- RTÉ Sports Team of the Year Award
  - (gold) Winners (1): 2013

== Under-21 team ==
At the Under-21 grade, Clare has won four Munster titles and four All-Ireland titles.

2009
Under-21 breakthrough

Clare lost twelve Munster Under-21 Hurling Championship (U21HC) finals, before finally making a breakthrough in 2009. In the opening round of that year, Clare defeated Limerick at Cusack Park in Ennis to qualify for the final. In the Munster U21HC final, which was played in Dungarvan, Clare defeated Waterford by a scoreline of 2–17 to 2–12. Clare faced a highly fancied Galway side in the 2009 All-Ireland Under-21 Hurling Championship (U21HC) semi-final. The match could not be decided over the sixty minutes, so extra-time was required. Clare won the game by a scoreline of 3–23 to 5–15. In September 2009, Clare won a first All-Ireland U21HC title with a 0–15 to 0–14 defeat of Kilkenny in the final at Croke Park in Dublin. The match was a tight affair and was only decided after a late Cormac O'Donovan point. A second half contribution of three points from play from John Conlon was pivotal in helping Clare to victory. Darach Honan received the Bord Gáis Breakthrough award for 2009.

2012–2014
All-Ireland U21HC treble

In 2012, Clare easily accounted for Waterford in the Munster U21HC semi-final to qualify for the final against Tipperary. Going into injury time in that game, Claire trailed by a single point, but a late goal from second-half substitute, Niall Arthur, helped Clare win the game by a scoreline of 1–16 to 1–14. Clare then beat Antrim in the 2012 All-Ireland U21HC semi-final. In the final Clare outplayed Kilkenny to win by a scoreline of 2–17 to 2–11.

Clare retained the Munster and All-Ireland U21HC titles the following year. In the opening round of the 2013 campaign, Clare defeated Waterford by a scoreline of 2–15 to 0–17, then once more faced Tipperary in the Munster U21HC final, this time at Semple Stadium, Thurles. Clare won the game by a scoreline of 1–17 to 2–10. In the 2013 All-Ireland U21HC semi-final, Clare easily accounted for Galway with a 1–16 to 0–7 win. The team successfully defended the All-Ireland U21HC title by defeating Antrim by a scoreline of 2–28 to 0–12 in the final. In 2014, Clare defeated Limerick by 2–20 to 1–14 to reach the Munster U21HC semi-final where, after extra-time, they defeated Tipperary by 5–19 to 1–25. In what was a sixth final in seven years, Clare easily accounted for Cork, winning by 1–28 to 1–13. This was the first time any Clare team had won three consecutive provincial titles. Clare qualified for a third successive All-Ireland U21HC final after beating Antrim by a scoreline of 4–28 to 1–10 in the 2014 All-Ireland U21HC semi-final. Clare completed the All-Ireland U21HC treble with a defeat of Wexford by a scoreline of 2–20 to 3–11 in the final, again at Semple Stadium, Thurles.

=== Honours ===
- All-Ireland Under-21 Hurling Championship
  - (gold) Winners (5): 2009, 2012, 2013, 2014 2026
- Munster Under-21 Hurling Championship
  - (gold) Winners (5): 2009, 2012, 2013, 2014, 2026
  - (silver) Runners-up (14): 1972, 1974, 1976, 1983, 1985, 1986, 1992, 1994, 1995, 1996, 1999, 2008, 2010, 2015

Munster Under-21 Hurler of the Year

- 2009 – Darach Honan
- 2012 – Tony Kelly
- 2013 – Colm Galvin
- 2014 – Séadna Morey

=== Competitive record ===
This is Meath's record in All-Ireland U21HC finals.

#	Date	Opponent	Result	Clare captain	Venue	W/D/L
1	13 September 2009	Kilkenny	0–15 : 0–14	Ciarán O'Doherty	Croke Park, Dublin	W
2	15 September 2012	Kilkenny	2–17 : 2–11	Conor McGrath	Semple Stadium, Thurles	W
3	14 September 2013	Antrim	2–28 : 0–12	Paul Flanagan	Semple Stadium, Thurles	W
4	13 September 2014	Wexford	2–20 : 3–11	Tony Kelly	Semple Stadium, Thurles	W

== Minor team ==
At the minor grade, Clare has won four Munster titles and one All-Ireland title.

1981 & 1989
Arrival on the scene

Clare won the Munster Minor Hurling Championship (MHC) title for the first time in 1981, defeating Tipperary by two points, 3–13 to 3–11. Clare did not qualify for the final again until 1989. The opponent that time was Limerick; Clare won the game by a single point, 2–13 to 2–12. Clare qualified for the All-Ireland MHC final, but lost by a scoreline of 2–16 to 1–12 to Offaly.

1997
All-Ireland MHC title

The 1997 All-Ireland MHC was Clare's first and only title in the minor grade, the county's minors completing a double with the seniors, victors over Tipperary on the same day's 1997 All-Ireland SHC final. The minor team qualified through "the backdoor", after a 2–13 to 1–13 loss to Tipperary in the Munster MHC final. Clare defeated Antrim by a scoreline of 0–13 to 1–4, then defeated Kilkenny in the All-Ireland MHC semi-final by a scoreline of 0–13 to 1–7. Clare then defeated Galway by a scoreline of 1–11 to 1–9 in the final.

2010–2011
Back-to-back Munster MHC titles

Clare lost to Waterford in the opening round of the 2010 Munster MHC, but qualified for the competition's semi-final after beating Kerry and Tipperary, by 0–17 to 1–13, in the play-offs. Clare defeated Limerick by a scoreline of 1–17 to 2–12 in the Munster MHC semi-final. Clare met Waterford again in the All-Ireland MHC final, and made up for the opening round defeat by winning 1–16 to 1–11. Clare defeated Dublin by a scoreline of 0–20 to 2–13 in the 2010 All-Ireland MHC semi-final, but lost the final to Kilkenny by 2–10 to 0–14.

Clare retained the Munster MHC title in 2011. Clare easily accounted for Kerry in the opening round, and defeated Tipperary by 3–13 to 1–13 in the semi-final. Clare defeated Waterford by 1–20 to 3–9 in the final, thus becoming the first team from the county to retain a Munster MHC title. In the 2011 All-Ireland MHC semi-final, Galway defeated Clare, 1–23 to 1–18, after extra-time. Clare missed out on a three-in-a-row series of Munster MHC titles by losing the 2012 Munster MHC final to Tipperary, 1–16 to 1–12.

=== Honours ===
- All-Ireland Minor Hurling Championship
  - (gold) Winners (2): 1997, 2023
  - (silver) Runners-up (2): 1989, 2010
- Munster Minor Hurling Championship
  - (gold) Winners (5): 1981, 1989, 2010, 2011, 2023
  - (silver) Runners-up (16): 1932, 1939, 1940, 1945, 1949, 1950, 1952, 1971, 1990, 1997, 1998 1999, 2012, 2017, 2019, 2022

Munster Minor Hurler of the Year

- 2010 – Niall Arthur
- 2011 – Tony Kelly

=== Competitive record ===
This is Meath's record in All-Ireland MHC finals.

#	Date	Opponent	Result	Clare captain	Venue	W/D/L
1	3 September 1989	Offaly	1–12 : 2–16	Paul Lee	Croke Park, Dublin	L
2	14 September 1997	Galway	1–11 : 1–9	John Reddan	Croke Park, Dublin	W
3	5 September 2010	Kilkenny	0–14 : 2–10	Paul Flanagan	Croke Park, Dublin	L
