= Peter Duggan =

Irish hurler (born 1993)

Personal information
- Native name: Peadar Duagáin (Irish)
- Born: September 1993 (age 33) Clooney, County Clare, Ireland
- Occupation: Hurler
- Height: 6 ft 6 in (198 cm)

Sport
- Sport: Hurling
- Position: Left wing-forward
Club
- Years: Club
- Clooney-Quin
Club titles
- Clare titles: 0
College
- Years: College
- Limerick Institute of Technology
College titles
- Fitzgibbon titles: 0
Inter-county*
Years	County	Apps (scores)
2012–present	Clare	46 (7-162)
Inter-county titles
- Munster titles: 0
- All-Irelands: 2
- NHL: 2
- All Stars: 2
- *Inter County team apps and scores correct as of match played 25 May 2025.

Peter Duggan (born September 1993) is an Irish hurler who plays for Clare Senior Championship club Clooney-Quin and at inter-county level with the Clare senior hurling team. He usually lines out as a right wing-forward.

== Playing career ==
=== Clooney-Quin ===
Duggan joined the Clooney-Quin club at a young age and played in all grades at juvenile and underage levels before eventually progressing onto the club's senior team.

On 15 October 2017, Duggan was named at left wing-forward but played at full-forward when Clooney-Quin qualified for their first Clare Senior Championship final in 73 years. He scored ten points, including a last minute free to secure a 1–16 to 0–19 draw with Sixmilebridge. Duggan top scored again with ten points in the replay, however, Clooney-Quin were defeated by 1–20 to 1–14.

=== Clare ===
==== Minor and under-21 ====
Duggan first played for Clare as a member of the minor team. He made his first appearance on 27 April 2011 when he was introduced as a half-time substitute for Frank Melody in a 6–24 to 1–08 defeat of Kerry in the Munster Championship. On 10 July, Duggan scored a point from left wing-forward when Clare defeated Waterford by 1–20 to 3–09 in the Munster Championship final.

On 19 July 2012, Duggan made his first appearance for the Clare under-21 team when he came on as a substitute for Tony Kelly in a 2–22 to 0-09 Munster Championship defeat of Waterford. On 8 August, he won his first Munster Championship medal when he came on as a substitute in Clare's 1–16 to 1–14 defeat of Tipperary in the final. On 15 September, Duggan started the All-Ireland final on the bench but came on as a substitute for Aaron Cunningham in the 2–17 to 2–11 defeat of Kilkenny.

Duggan became a regular member of the Clare under-21 starting fifteen during the 2013 Munster Championship. On 7 August, he won his second successive Munster Championship medal after scoring a goal in Clare's 1–17 to 2–10 defeat of Tipperary in the final. On 14 September, Duggan won his second successive All-Ireland medal, in spite of being held scoreless, following Clare's 2–28 to 0–12 defeat of Antrim in the final.

On 30 July 2014, Duggan won a third successive Munster Championship medal after scoring two points from right wing-forward in Clare's 1–28 to 1–13 defeat of Cork in the final. He was switched to left wing-forward for the All-Ireland final against Wexford on 13 September 2014. Duggan was held scoreless but won a third successive All-Ireland Championship medal after the 2–20 to 3–11 victory.

==== Senior ====
Duggan was called up to the Clare senior hurling team by Davy Fitzgerald in 2012. He made his first appearance on 7 February in a 2–13 to 1–13 defeat of Limerick in the pre-season Waterford Crystal Cup. Duggan was an unused substitute for the subsequent National Hurling League and All-Ireland Championship campaigns.

On 10 February 2013, Duggan claimed his first silverware when Clare defeated Tipperary by 1–21 to 1–13 to win the Waterford Crystal Cup. He made his first National League appearance on 14 April in a 0–31 to 2–23 defeat of Cork. On 2 June, Duggan made his first Munster Championship appearance when he came on as a 29th-minute substitute for Séadna Morey in a 2–20 to 1–15 defeat of Waterford. On 8 September, he was an unused substitute in the 0–25 to 3–16 draw with Cork in the All-Ireland final. Duggan was again an unused substitute for the replay on 28 September. In spite of remaining on the bench he won an All-Ireland medal after a 5–16 to 3–16 victory.

On 23 January 2016, Duggan scored three points when Clare defeated Limerick by 0–18 to 0–17 to win the inaugural Munster League. On 1 May, he scored a point from right wing-forward in Clare's 0-22 apiece draw with Waterford in the National League final. Duggan was dropped for the replay on 8 May, however, he won a National League medal as a non-playing substitute following Clare's 1–23 to 2–19 defeat of Waterford.

On 9 July 2017, Duggan lined out in his first Munster Championship final. After starting the game on the bench he was introduced as a 65th-minute substitute for Cathal Malone in the 1–25 to 1–20 defeat by Cork.

On 1 July 2018, Duggan top scored with 1-07 for Clare in their 2–24 to 3–19 defeat by Cork in the Munster Championship final. On 8 August, he was voted as the PwC GAA/GPA Player of the Month for July as a result of his "outstanding form throughout this championship". Duggan, who ended the championship as top scorer with 3-76, was later named in the right wing-forward position on the All-Star team.

On 21 July 2024, he started in the half-back line as Clare won the All-Ireland for the first time in 11 years after an extra-time win against Cork by 3–29 to 1-34, claiming their fifth All-Ireland title.

== Career statistics ==
As of match played 25 May 2025

Team	Year	National League			Munster		All-Ireland		Total	
Team	Year	Division	Apps	Score	Apps	Score	Apps	Score	Apps	Score
Clare	2012	Division 1B	0	0-00	0	0-00	0	0-00	0	0-00
Clare	2013	Division 1A	1	0-00	1	0-00	2	0-04	4	0-04
Clare	2014	Division 1A	5	1-03	1	0-00	2	0-00	8	1-03
Clare	2015	Division 1A	0	0-00	0	0-00	0	0-00	0	0-00
Clare	2016	Division 1B	2	1-01	0	0-00	0	0-00	2	1-01
Clare	2017	Division 1A	3	0-01	1	0-00	1	0-01	5	0-02
Clare	2018	Division 1A	6	1-48	5	2-49	3	1-27	14	4-124
Clare	2019	Division 1A	6	3-33	4	0-40	—		10	3-73
Clare	2020	Division 1A	Did not Play							
Clare	2021	Division 1A	Did not Play							
Clare	2022	Division 1A	3	0-00	5	1–16	2	0-06	10	1-22
Clare	2023	Division 1A			5	1-02	2	0-01	7	1-02
Clare	2024	Division 1A			5	1-05	3	0-03	8	1-08
Clare	2025	Division 1A			4	1-08			4	1-08
Total			26	6-86	31	6-120	15	1-42	72	13-247

== Honours ==
=== Team ===
Clare

- All-Ireland Senior Hurling Championship (2): 2013, 2024
- National Hurling League (2): 2016, 2024
- Munster Senior Hurling League (1): 2016
- Waterford Crystal Cup (1): 2013
- All-Ireland Under-21 Hurling Championship (3): 2012, 2013, 2014
- Munster Under-21 Hurling Championship (3): 2012, 2013, 2014
- Munster Minor Hurling Championship (1): 2011

=== Individual ===
Awards

- GAA GPA All Stars Awards (2): 2018, 2026
- GAA/GPA Player of the Month (1): July 2018

=== Records ===
Clare

- All-Ireland Senior Hurling Championship Top Scorer (1): 2018
