= 2012 All-Ireland Under-21 Hurling Championship final =

2012 All-Ireland Under-21 Hurling Championship Final
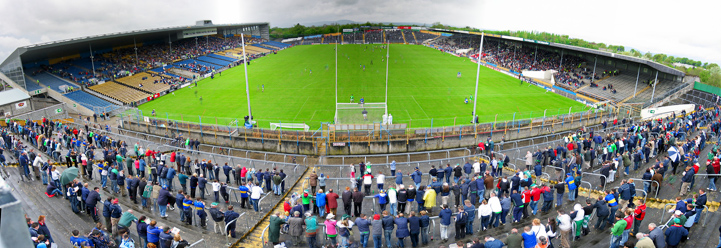
- Event: 2012 All-Ireland Under-21 Hurling Championship
Clare	Kilkenny
2-17	2-11
- Date: 15 September 2012
- Venue: Semple Stadium, Thurles
- Man of the Match: Cathal O'Connell
- Referee: Diarmuid Kirwan (Cork)
- Attendance: 9,250

The 2012 All-Ireland Under-21 Hurling Championship final was a hurling match that was played at Semple Stadium, Thurles on 15 September 2012 to determine the winners of the 2012 All-Ireland Under-21 Hurling Championship, the 49th season of the All-Ireland Under-21 Hurling Championship, a tournament organised by the Gaelic Athletic Association for the champion teams of the four provinces of Ireland. The final was contested by Clare of Munster and Kilkenny of Leinster, with Clare winning by 2-17 to 2-11.

The All-Ireland final between Clare and Antrim was their second ever championship meeting. Clare were appearing in their second final in four years, while Kilkenny were lining out in their 21st All-Ireland decider. goal gave Clare a 2-16 to 0-3 lead. Antrim added another point before the short whistle to reduce the deficit to 18 points.

Cathal McInerney, Cathal O'Connell and wing-back Séadna Morey scored points in the beginning. In the sixth minute, captain Conor McGrath sent O'Connell in for the opening goal. John Power secured Kilkenny’s second score, but a couple of long-range efforts from Colm Galvin and Patrick O'Connor eased the Munster men in to a 1-5 to 0-2 lead. Kilkenny gained momentum and reduced the deficit before stunning Clare with two goals in the final three minutes of the half. Power won a penalty that he blasted home himself, and in stoppage time Ger Aylward got in behind his marker to first time the sliotar to the net.

Clare were back in front within four minutes of the restart. Intense pressure brought them four quick-fire points, with three of them from the stick of O’Connell. When Conor McGrath smashed home their second goal on 44 minutes, they led by four. O'Connor made a vital interception to deny Aylward as Kilkenny pressed in the closing stages for the goal that would bring them back into the game. But with McGrath and Shane Golden having stretched the advantage to six, it was looking good for Clare. They could have had a third goal in the dying stages when O’Connell brought a save from Walsh, and later, Paul Flanagan stepped in to repel the Cats once again.

Clare's All-Ireland victory was their second ever.

== Match ==
=== Details ===
15 September 2012

Clare	2-17 - 2-11	Kilkenny
C O’Connell 1-6 (0-4f), C McGrath 1-0, C McInerney 0-3 (0-1f), T Kelly 0-2 (0-1f), S Morey 0-1, C Galvin 0-1, P O’Connor 0-1, P Collins 0-1, S Golden 0-1.		K Kelly 0-6 (0-4f), G Aylward 1-1, J Power 1-0 (1-0 pen), W Walsh 0-2, P Walsh 0-1, G Brennan 0-1.

Semple Stadium, Thurles
Attendance: 11,148
Referee: C Lyons (Cork)

Clare	Kilkenny
