= 1977–78 National Hurling League =

47th season of the National Hurling League

League details
- Dates: 9 October 1977 – 6 August 1978

League champions
- Winners: Clare (3rd win)

Other division winners
- Division 2: Carlow

The 1977–78 National Hurling League was the 47th season of the National Hurling League.

== Division 1 ==
National Hurling League Division 1
- Season: 1977-78
- Champions: Clare; 3rd National League title Captain: Seán Stack; Manager: Harry Bohan
- Relegated: Westmeath
- Top goalscorer: Ned Buggy (5-46)
- All statistics correct as of 28 February 2017.

Clare came into the season as defending champions of the 1976-77 season. Westmeath entered Division 1 as the promoted team.

On 30 April 1978, Clare won the title after a 3-10 to 1-10 win over Kilkenny in the final. It was their third league title overall and their second in succession.

Westmeath were relegated from Division 1 after just one season in the top flight.

=== Division 1A table ===
Pos	Team	Pld	W	D	L	Pts	Notes
1	Clare	6	3	1	2	7	Division 1 champions
2	Kilkenny	6	3	0	3	6	Division 1 runners-up
3	Wexford	6	3	0	3	6	
4	Galway	6	3	0	3	6	
5	Offaly	6	3	0	3	6	
6	Cork	6	3	0	3	6	Relegated to Division 1B
7	Tipperary	6	2	1	3	5	Relegated to Division 1B

=== Group stage results ===
9 October 1977	Clare	4-13 - 1-10	Galway	Dr. Daly Park, Tulla
	C Honan 1-5, J McNamara 1-3, M McKeogh 1-0, P More 1-0, P O'Connor 0-2, S Hehir 0-1, G Loughnane 0-1, J Callanan 0-1.		S Cloonan 1-1, T Furey 0-3, S Silke 0-2, N Lane 0-2, PJ Molloy 0-1, M Connolly 0-1.	Referee: S O'Meara (Tipperary)

16 October 1977	Tipperary	1-17 - 3-10	Kilkenny	Semple Stadium, Thurles
	J Kehoe 1-5, L McGrath 0-3, J Carey 0-3, P Quigley 0-2, T Butler 0-1, M Brophy 0-1, S Ryan 0-1, J Flanagan 0-1.			Referee: F Murphy (Cork)

16 October 1977	Offaly	1-9 - 0-11	Wexford	St. Brendan's Park, Birr
	P Moloughney 1-1, PJ Whelehan 0-1, B Keeshan 0-1, J Kelly 0-1, M Cleere 0-1, E Coughlan 0-1, P Delaney 0-1, M Cashin 0-1.		N Buggy 0-8, M Jacob 0-1, C Kehoe 0-1, D Rowesome 0-1.	Referee: J Rankisn (Laois)

30 October 1977	Clare	1-10 - 3-4	Tipperary	Dr. Daly Park, Tulla
	N Casey 1-2, C Honan 0-3, P O'Connor 0-2, P Morey 0-1, S Hehir 0-1, M McKeogh 0-1.		T Butler 1-2, J Kehoe 1-0, J Flanagan 1-0, J Carey 0-2.	Referee: J Rankins (Laois)

30 October 1977	Galway	2-10 - 1-10	Cork	Pearse Stadium, Salthill
	F Burke 1-2, N Lane 1-1, I Clarke 0-3, PJ Molloy 0-2, S Silke 0-1, G Holland 0-1.		J Barry-Murphy 1-1, C McCarthy 0-4, M Malone 0-2, J Horgan 0-1, D Coughlan 0-1, T Cashman 0-1.

30 October 1977	Kilkenny	1-10 - 0-6	Offaly	Nowlan Park, Kilkenny
	L O'Brien 0-4, T Brennan 1-0, B Cody 0-3, B Fennelly 0-2, B Waldron 0-1.		J Kelly 0-2, M Cleere 0-1, P Horan 0-1, M Cashin 0-1, P Moloughney 0-1.

6 November 1977	Cork	1-19 - 0-11	Clare	Páirc Uí Chaoimh, Cork
	C McCarthy 1-5, J Horgan 0-4, T Cashman 0-2, J Barry-Murphy 0-2, T Murphy 0-2, R Cummins 0-1, N Crowley 0-1, T Crowley 0-1, M Malone 0-1.		P Morey 0-4, P O'Connor 0-2, S Hehir 0-1, S Stack 0-1, J McNamara 0-1, E O'Connor 0-1, J Callanan 0-1.	Referee: S O'Grady (Limerick)

6 November 1977	Wexford	4-13 - 3-13	Tipperary	O'Kennedy Park, New Ross
	N Buggy 2-5, J Quigley 1-2, T Doran 1-1, D Bernie 0-3, J Conran 0-1, M Butler 0-1.		J Carey 3-1, T Butler 0-8, J Kehoe 0-2, J Flanagan 0-1, L McGrath 0-1.	Referee: L Horgan (Cork)

13 November 1977	Wexford	1-11 - 2-7	Kilkenny	Wexford Park, Wexford
	T Doran 1-3, J Quigley 0-4, R Kinsella 0-1, N Buggy 0-1, J Murphy 0-1, M Quigley 0-1.		T Brennan 1-0, M Ruth 1-0, L O'Brien 0-3, B Fitzpatrick 0-2, B Waldron 0-1, M Line 0-1.

13 November 1977	Offaly	1-11 - 3-13	Clare	St. Brendan's Park, Birr
	P Horan 1-2, P Delaney 0-5, PJ Whelehan 0-2, M Cashin 0-1, A Fogarty 0-1.		M McKeogh 1-2, P O'Connor 1-1, E O'Connor 1-0, J Callanan 0-3, P Morey 0-3, S Hehir 0-2, M Murphy 0-1, S Stack 0-1.	Referee: S Brennan (Galway)

13 November 1977	Tipperary	1-10 - 1-11	Galway	MacDonagh Park, Cloughjordan
	J Williams 1-1, L McGrath 0-3, M Doyle 0-1, T O'Connor 0-1, M Brophy 0-1.		PJ Molloy 0-5, F Gantley 1-0, N Lane 0-3, T O'Donoghue 0-1, F Burke 0-1, A Fenton 0-1.	Referee: P Moylan (Offaly)

20 November 1977	Kilkenny	1-6 - 1-2	Cork	Nowlan Park, Kilkenny
	T Brennan 1-0, B Waldron 0-2, L O'Brien 0-2, B Fitzpatrick 0-1, M Ruth 0-1.		J Barry-Murphy 1-0, C McCarthy 0-2.	Referee: J Moloney (Tipperary)

27 November 1977	Clare	1-13 - 2-12	Wexford	Dr. Daly Park, Tulla
	P Morey 1-7, J McNamara 0-2, P O'Connor 0-2, E O'Connor 0-1, M McKeogh 0-1.		N Buggy 1-5, M Quigley 1-1, M Jacob 0-2, M Butler 0-1, T Doran 0-1, J Quigley 0-1, R Kinsella 0-1.	Referee: S O'Connor (Limerick)

27 November 1977	Cork	2-9 - 2-7	Tipperary	Páirc Uí Chaoimh, Cork
	P Moylan 1-2, J Fenton 0-5, E O'Donoghue 1-1, C McCarthy 0-1.		T Butler 0-5, C O'Neill 1-0, J Williams 1-0, P Butler 0-2.	Referee: P Johnston (Kilkenny)

27 November 1977	Galway	1-8 - 2-7	Offaly	St. Brendan's Park, Loughrea
	PJ Molloy 1-4, F Gantley 0-1, A Fenton 0-1, G Holland 0-1, S Hynes 0-1.		P Carroll 1-0, P Hoctor 1-0, P Delaney 0-3, M Cleere 0-2, M Cashin 0-1, P Horan 0-1.	Referee: J Rankins (Laois)

29 January 1978	Offaly	3-4 - 2-6	Cork	St. Brendan's Park, Birr
	P Horan 1-1, D Egan 1-0, J Kelly 1-0, B Coolahan 0-1, P Delaney 0-1, P Pardy 0-1.		T Cashman 1-0, M Malone 1-0, C McCarthy 0-3, J Barry-Murphy 0-1, G McCarthy 0-1, P Moylan 0-1.	Referee: S Brennan (Galway)

29 January 1978	Kilkenny	2-5 - 2-8	Clare	Nowlan Park, Kilkenny
	B Fitzpatrick 1-1, B Cody 1-0, L O'Brien 0-3, G Henderson 0-1.		M McKeogh 1-5, J Callanan 1-0, P O'Connor 0-2, M Moroney 0-1.	Referee: J Moloney (Tipperary)

29 January 1978	Wexford	1-6 - 2-9	Galway	Enniscorthy
	M Quigley 1-0, N Buggy 0-3, J Murphy 0-1, R Kinsella 0-1, D Bernie 0-1.		PJ Molloy 1-3, G Holland 1-3, N Lane 0-2, F Gantley 0-1.	Referee: JJ Landers (Waterford)

26 February 1978	Cork	1-15 - 0-9	Wexford	Páirc Uí Chaoimh, Cork
	R Cummins 0-4, C McCarthy 0-4, J Barry-Murphy 1-0, J Horgan 0-3, G McCarthy 0-2, P Moylan 0-1, M Malone 0-1.		N Buggy 0-3, R Kinsella 0-3, J Quigley 0-2, D Bernie 0-1.	Referee: N O'Donoghue (Dublin)

26 February 1978	Galway	0-3 - 0-9	Kilkenny	Duggan Park, Ballinasloe
	PJ Molloy 0-2, J Connolly 0-1.		B Fennelly 0-4, L Fitzpatrick 0-2, K Brennan 0-2, M Tierney 0-1.	Referee: S O'Grady (Limerick)

26 February 1978	Tipperary	1-10 - 0-7	Offaly	Semple Stadium, Thurles
	S Hennessy 1-2, T Butler 0-5, M Brophy 0-1, J Carey 0-1, J Williams 0-1.		D Egan 0-2, B Bermingham 0-2, P Delaney 0-1, P Horan 0-1, PJ Whelehan 0-1.	Referee: JJ Landers (Waterford)

=== Division 1B table ===
Pos	Team	Pld	W	D	L	Pts	Notes
1	Limerick	6	5	1	0	11	Promoted to Division 1A
2	Waterford	6	4	1	1	9	Promoted to Division 1A
3	Antrim	6	4	0	2	8	
4	Dublin	6	2	0	4	4	
5	Laois	6	2	0	4	4	
6	Kildare	6	2	0	4	4	
7	Westmeath	6	1	0	5	2	Relegated to Division 2

=== Group stage results ===
9 October 1977	Dublin	2-7 - 1-9	Westmeath	Croke Park, Dublin
	J Thompson 1-3, L Hennebry 1-1, J Towell 0-1, W Walsh 0-1, M Holden 0-1.		M Kilcoyne 1-1, M Cosgrove 0-4, A Kelly 0-2, G Phelan 0-1, JJ Lynch 0-1.	Referee: G Delaney (Wicklow)

9 October 1977	Waterford	5-10 - 0-5	Laois	Walsh Park, Waterford
	J Greene 4-2, M Hickey 1-0, P McGrath 0-2, N Connors 0-2, P Kelly 0-2, M Walsh 0-1, P O'Grady 0-1.		M Walsh 0-5.	Referee: J Denton (Wexford)

16 October 1977	Laois	2-8 - 0-12	Dublin	O'Moore Park, Portlaoise
	F Keenan 1-0, M Cuddy 1-0, J Galvin 0-3, M Mahon 0-2, M Walsh 0-1, J Mahon 0-1, A Lanham 0-1.		M Holden 0-2, L Hennebry 0-2, T Quinn 0-2, L Walsh 0-2, J Thompson 0-1, B Donovan 0-1, J Towell 0-1.	Referee: S O'Meara (Tipperary)

16 October 1977	Kildare	1-11 - 4-16	Waterford	Sallins Road, Naas
	J O'Leary 1-3, J Walsh 0-6, J Winders 0-1, M Moore 0-1.		P Kelly 2-2, M Hickey 1-3, D Fitzpatrick 0-6, J Greene 1-0, J Galvin 0-2, M Walsh 0-2, M Whelan 0-1.	Referee: C Foley (Dublin)

16 October 1977	Westmeath	0-4 - 1-15	Antrim	Cusack Park, Mullingar
	D McCormack 0-1, G Whelan 0-1, J Fitzsimons 0-1, M Jackson 0-1.		J Crossey 1-3, P McFaul 0-5, J O'Neill 0-3, M McKeegan 0-2, S Collins 0-1, F Ward 0-1.	Referee: P Moylan (Offaly)

30 October 1977	Limerick	3-11 - 0-5	Westmeath
	E Cregan 1-2, D O'Connor 1-2, W Fitzmaurice 1-1, L O'Donoghue 0-3, G Mullan 0-1, S Condon 0-1, L O'Brien 0-1.		J Fitzsimmons 0-2, F Carley 0-1, M Kilcoyne 0-1, N Fitzsimmons 0-1.

30 October 1977	Antrim	3-13 - 2-3	Laois	Glenravel
	P McFaul 2-6, J Crossey 1-1, P Boyle 0-2, J O'Neill 0-2, M O'Connell 0-1, D Donnelly 0-1.		F Keenan 1-1, A Lanham 1-0, M Walsh 0-2.

30 October 1977	Dublin	4-10 - 2-6	Kildare	Croke Park, Dublin
	M Reidy 1-1, M Holden 1-1, B Donovan 1-1, W Walsh 0-4, L Hennebry 1-0, D Murphy 0-1, J Thompson 0-1, E Rheinisch 0-1.		J O'Leary 1-0, M Deely 1-0, P White 0-3, J Walsh 0-2, B Burke 0-1.

13 November 1977	Waterford	3-13 - 3-7	Dublin	Walsh Park, Waterford
	J Greene 2-2, D Fitzpatrick 0-6, M Hickey 1-2, J Galvin 0-2, M Walsh 0-1.		E Flynn 1-4, B Donovan 1-0, J Towell 1-0, L Walsh 0-1, M Reidy 0-1, T Cooke 0-1.	Referee: G Ryan (Tipperary)

13 November 1977	Kildare	2-12 - 1-14	Antrim	Geraldine Park, Athy
	J Walsh 0-5, J O'Leary 1-1, M Moore 1-0, P Connolly 0-2, B Burke 0-1, P White 0-1, G Tiernan 0-1, P Dunny 0-1.		A Hamill 1-7, S Collins 0-4, V Denny 0-1, S McNaughton 0-1, P Boyle 0-1.	Referee: M Slattery (Clare)

20 November 1977	Laois	0-11 - 2-7	Limerick	Kelly Daly Park, Rathdowney
	F Keenan 0-4, Michael Cuddy 0-3, J Mahon 0-1, P Dillon 0-1, M Walsh 0-1, Martin Cuddy 0-1.		E Grimes 1-2, L O'Donoghue 1-0, L O'Brien 0-1, V O'Connor 0-1, E Cregan 0-1, P Hartigan 0-1, T Marsh 0-1.	Referee: S O'Meara (Tipperary)

27 November 1977	Limerick	2-13 - 1-6	Kildare	FitzGerald Park, Kilmallock
	E Cregan 1-5, E Grimes 1-1, J McKenna 0-2, L O'Donoghue 0-2, W Fitzmaurice 0-1, T Marsh 0-1, P Hartigan 0-1.		R Burke 1-1, J Walsh 0-2, P White 0-2, P Connolly 0-1.	Referee: P Cronin (Cork)

27 November 1977	Westmeath	4-8 - 4-10	Laois	Cusack Park, Mullingar
	J Kilcoyne 1-3, M Ryan 1-1, J Fitzsimons 1-1, D McCormack 1-1, N Kilcoyne 0-1.		F Keenan 1-3, MArtin Cuddy 1-1, J Lanham 1-0, Michael Cuddy 1-0, J Mahon 0-2, J Galvin 0-2, P Kelly 0-1, M Walsh 0-1.	Referee: P Moylan (Offaly)

27 November 1977	Antrim	3-8 - 3-7	Waterford	Corrigan Park, Belfast
	P Boyle 1-2, J O'Neill 1-1, P McIlhatton 1-0, A Hamill 0-3, J Crossey 0-1, S Collins 0-1.		J Greene 2-1, M Walsh 0-5, M Hickey 1-0, D Fitzpatrick 0-1.	Referee: N O'Donoghue (Dublin)

4 December 1977	Antrim	1-12 - 3-12	Limerick	Corrigan Park, Belfast
	A Hamill 1-1, J Crossey 0-3, S Collins 0-2, P McFaul 0-2, D McNaughton 0-1, M O'Connell 0-1, P Boyle 0-1, J Delargy 0-1.		E Grimes 0-7, J McKenna 1-3, W Fitzmaurice 1-0, L O'Donoghue 1-0, E McGrath 0-1, M Carroll 0-1.	Referee: P Quinn (Tyrone)

29 January 1978	Dublin	1-7 - 3-9	Antrim	Croke Park, Dublin
	J Towell 1-0, D Murphy 0-2, B Donovan 0-2, J McCarthy 0-1, L Hennebry 0-1, M Reidy 0-1.		R McDonnell 1-4, J O'Neill 1-1, J Crossey 1-1, A Hamill 0-2, S Collins 0-1.	Referee: G Kirwan (Offaly)

29 January 1978	Kildare	1-9 - 1-10	Westmeath	St. Conleth's Park, Newbridge
	J Walsh 0-8, M Moore 1-0, P White 0-1.		J Kilcoyne 1-1, M Ryan 0-3, M Newman 0-3, R Cosgrove 0-1, D McCormack 0-1, N Fitzsimons 0-1.	Referee: C Foley (Dublin)

5 February 1978	Waterford	1-15 - 2-12	Limerick	Walsh Park, Waterford
	M Walsh 0-6, P McGrath 1-0, P Kelly 0-3, M Hickey 0-2, J Greene 0-1, J Dalton 0-1, N Connors 0-1, K Ryan 0-1.		J McKenna 1-2, L O'Donoghue 1-0, W Fitzmaurice 0-3, E Cregan 0-3, F Grimes 0-3, L O'Brien 0-1.	Referee: G Ryan (Tipperary)

26 February 1978	Limerick	4-7 - 2-7	Dublin	Gaelic Grounds, Limerick
	E Cregan 1-6, J McKenna 2-0, L O'Brien 1-0, J Carrol 0-1.		V Holden 2-1, L Hennebry 0-3, T Quinn 0-2, M Holden 0-1.	Referee: S Brennan (Galway)

26 February 1978	Westmeath	2-6 - 5-10	Waterford	Castletown Geoghegan
				Referee: P Moylan (Offaly)

26 February 1978	Laois	2-13 - 3-11	Kildare	Kelly Daly Park, Rathdowney
	M Walsh 0-7, F Keenan 1-2, A Lanham 1-0, Mick Cuddy 0-2, P Dillon 0-1, J Mahon 0-1.		J O'Leary 2-1, J Walsh 1-2, P White 0-3, M Moore 0-2, G Tiernan 0-1, P Dunny 0-1, P Connolly 0-1.	Referee: G Kirwan (Offaly)

=== Play-offs ===
12 March 1978 Play-off	Galway	2-12 - 1-4	Cork	Semple Stadium, Thurles
	F Burke 1-2, PJ Molloy 1-1, F Gantley 0-2, G Holland 0-2, I Clarke 0-2, N Lane 0-1, J McDonagh 0-1.		R Cummins 1-1, C McCarthy 0-2, J Horgan 0-1.	Referee: N O'Donoghue (Dublin)

12 March 1978 Play-off	Kilkenny	0-15 - 2-7	Offaly	Semple Stadium, Thurles
	L O'Brien 0-5, B Fennelly 0-3, B Fitzpatrick 0-2, M Ruth 0-1, T Moran 0-1, J Henderson 0-1, F Cummins 0-1, K Brennan 0-1.		P Horan 2-0, P Delaney 0-4, P Carroll 0-1, PJ Whelehan 0-1, P McLoughney 0-1.	Referee: J Moloney (Tipperary)

19 March 1978 Play-off	Wexford	2-13 - 2-6	Offaly	Nowlan Park, Kilkenny

2 April 1978 Play-off	Offaly	1-9 - 0-9	Cork	Semple Stadium, Thurles
	J Kelly 1-2, P Moloughney 0-3, PJ Whelehan 0-2, P Delaney 0-1, P Pardy 0-1.		C McCarthy 0-4, R Cummins 0-4, M Malone 0-1.	Referee: G Ryan (Tipperary)

=== Knock-out stage ===
Quarter-finals

2 April 1978 Quarter-final	Limerick	3-16 - 4-5	Galway	Semple Stadium, Thurles
	J McKenna 3-3, W Fitzmaurice 0-5, E Grimes 0-3, J O'Brien 0-2, E Cregan 0-2, P Hartigan 0-1.		N Lane 4-0, PJ Molloy 0-3, G Holland 0-1, J Connolly 0-1.	Referee: J Rankins (Laois)

2 April 1978 Quarter-final	Wexford	2-10 – 1-9	Waterford	Nowlan Park, Kilkenny
	N Buggy 1-5, R Kinsella 1-1, C Keogh 0-2, T Doran 0-2.		M Walsh 1-3, J Dalton 0-2, M Hickey 0-1, J Greene 0-1, K Ryan 0-1, B Mansfield 0-1.	Referee: M Slattery (Clare)

Semi-finals

9 April 1978 Semi-final	Clare	2-16 – 3-6	Limerick	Semple Stadium, Thurles
	P O'Connor 1-3, C Honan 0-6, E O'Connor 1-2, M McKeogh 0-2, N Casey 0-2, M Moroney 0-1.		J McKenna 3-1, E Cregan 0-3, L O'Donoghue 0-1, E Grimes 0-1.	Referee: J Moloney (Tipperary)

9 April 1978 Semi-final	Kilkenny	3-5 – 2-8	Wexford	Dr. Cullen Park, Carlow
	T Malone 2-0, M Ruth 1-1, L O'Brien 0-3, F Cummins 0-1.		N Buggy 0-5, C Keogh 1-1, T Doran 1-1, R Kinsella 0-1.	Referee: F Murphy (Cork)

16 April 1978 Semi-final replay	Kilkenny	5-15 – 5-14 (aet)	Wexford	Dr. Cullen Park, Carlow
	M Ruth 2-2, T Malone 2-0, B Fitzpatrick 0-5, L O'Brien 0-4, M Crotty 1-0, P Lawlor 0-1, K Brennan 0-1, G Henderson 0-1, M Brennan 0-1.		N Buggy 2-6, C Keogh 1-3, T Doran 1-1, D Bernie 1-1, M Casey 0-1, J Quigley 0-1, R Kinsella 0-1.	Referee: F Murphy (Cork)

Final

30 April 1978 Final	Clare	3-10 – 1-10	Kilkenny	Semple Stadium, Thurles
15:30	M McKeogh 2-0, N Casey 1-2, P O'Connor 0-4, J McNamara 0-2, J Callinan 0-1, C Honan 0-1		L O'Brien 0-7, M Brennan 1-0, K Brennan 0-2, T Malone 0-1.	Attendance: 25,016; Referee: G Kirwan (Offaly)

=== Scoring statistics ===
Top scorers overall

Rank	Player	Team	Tally	Total	Matches	Average
1	Ned Buggy	Wexford	5-46	61	10	6.10
2	Joe McKenna	Limerick	10-11	41	7	5.87
3	Jim Greene	Waterford	10-8	38	7	5.42
4	Liam O'Brien	Kilkenny	0-34	34	10	3.40
5	Éamonn Cregan	Limerick	3-22	31	7	4.42
6	P. J. Molloy	Galway	3-21	30	7	4.28
7	Johnny Walshe	Kildare	1-25	28	6	4.66
7	Charlie McCarthy	Cork	1-25	28	8	3.50
9	Tommy Butler	Tipperary	1-23	26	6	4.33
9	Mossy Walsh	Waterford	1-23	26	7	3.71

=== Miscellaneous ===
- In Division 1B, Antrim defeated Laois for the first time in a competitive hurling match.

== Division 2 ==
National Hurling League Division 2
- Season: 1977-78
- Champions: Carlow
- Matches played: 16
- All statistics correct as of 28 February 2017.

On 6 August 1978, Carlow won the title after a 1-15 to 1-7 win over Kerry in the final.

=== Division 2 table ===
Pos	Team	Pld	W	D	L	Pts	Notes
1	Carlow	5	4	1	0	9	Division 2 champions
2	Kerry	5	3	2	0	8	Division 2 runners-up
3	Down	5	3	0	2	6	
4	Wicklow	5	2	0	3	4	
5	Meath	5	1	1	3	3	
6	Roscommon	5	0	0	5	0	

=== Knock-out stage ===
Final

6 August 1978 Final	Carlow	1-15 - 1-7	Kerry	Dr. Cullen Park, Carlow
	R Moore 1-1, E Quirke 0-4, T Kelly 0-3, P Quirke 0-2, J Kavanagh 0-2, W Cullen 0-2, J Murphy 0-1.		S Flaherty 0-6, S Carroll 1-0, J O'Grady 0-1.	Referee: J Rankins (Laois)
