= 2015 Fitzgibbon Cup =

Irish collegiate hurling tournament

Tournament details
- Year: 2015
- Trophy: Fitzgibbon Cup
- Sponsor: independent.ie

Winners
- Champions: University of Limerick (5th win)
- Manager: Brian Lohan
- Captain: David McInerney

Runners-up
- Runners-up: WIT
- Manager: Colm Bonnar
- Captain: Jake Dillon

Other
- Player of the Year: Tony Kelly

The 2015 independent.ie Fitzgibbon Cup was the 99th staging of the Fitzgibbon Cup since its establishment in 1912. The semi-finals were hosted by Limerick IT on 27 February 2015 with the final played the following day at the Gaelic Grounds, Limerick.

University of Limerick won the cup, defeating WIT in a replayed final on 11 March.

== Carlow IT Controversy ==
Carlow IT were disqualified on 16 February 2015 for fielding a part-time student James Gannon. Carlow IT appealed the decision on 18 February 2015, the appeal was upheld and the decision to disqualify Carlow IT was overturned. On 24 February 2015, Mary I's request for an interlocutory injunction was refused by the Disputes Resolution Authority (DRA). This meant that the remaining quarter-finals could go ahead on that same day.

== Fixtures and results ==
=== Group A ===
Pos	Team	Pld	W	D	L	SF	SA	Diff	Pts
1	CIT	3	3	0	0	2-50	3-30	17	6
2	UCD	3	2	0	1	4-49	3-34	18	4
3	DCU	3	1	0	2	3-40	2-44	-1	2
4	St. Pat's, Drumcondra	3	0	0	3	2-31	3-62	-34	0

29 January 2015; 14:00; Round 1	CIT	0-17 - 1-6	DCU	DCU Sportsgrounds; Referee: Brian Gavin
29 January 2015; 14:00; Round 1	J O'Dwyer 0-8 (7f), C Hammersly 0-3, J Herlihy, D Lordan, J Cronin, B Cooper, M Ellis, J Cashman 0-1 each.	Report	K O'Flynn 1-1, D Breathnach 0-3 (2f), P Breheny, D Staunton 0-1 each.	DCU Sportsgrounds; Referee: Brian Gavin

29 January 2015; 15:30; Round 1	UCD	1-23 - 1-6	St. Pat's, Drumcondra	Belfield, UCD; Referee: John Keane
29 January 2015; 15:30; Round 1	Matthew O'Hanlon (0-1), Pat Purcell (0-3), Colm O'Croinin (0-4), Conor Devitt (0-2), Jack O'Connor (0-2), Conor McDonagh (0-1), Ross King (0-6, 4 frees), Caolán Conway (1-4)	Report	Eoin Price (0-2), Peter Sutton (1-2, 0-1 free), Colm Morris (0-1), Jack McGrath (0-1)	Belfield, UCD; Referee: John Keane

5 February 2015; 14:00; Round 2	UCD	2-16 - 1-14	DCU	Belfield, UCD; Referee: Patrick Murphy
5 February 2015; 14:00; Round 2	O Ó'Ruairc (1-6, 0-4 frees); R King (0-5, 0-3 frees); C O'Croinin (1-1); C Devitt (0-2); C Buckley, C Conway (0-1)	Report	D Breathnach (0-10, 0-6 frees); K O'Flynn (1-0); C Boland (0-2); M Daly, P Breheny (0-1)	Belfield, UCD; Referee: Patrick Murphy

5 February 2015; 14:00; Round 2	CIT	1-19 - 1-14	St. Pat's, Drumcondra	St. Pat's; Referee: Owen Elliot
5 February 2015; 14:00; Round 2	A Walsh (1-3); P Ralph (0-5, 0-2 frees, 0-1 '65, 0-1 penalty); J Cronin (0-4); N McNamara (0-2); D Lordan, J Cashman, C Hammersley, S O'Mahoney, C Buckley (0-1)	Report	E Price (1-1); P Sutton (0-4, 0-1 free); J McGrath, E McIntyre (0-2); C Joyce (0-2, 0-1 sideline); C Breathnach, W Murphy, C Morris (0-1)	St. Pat's; Referee: Owen Elliot

10 February 2015; 19:00; Round 3	CIT	1-14 - 1-10	UCD	CIT; Referee: Gavin Quilty
10 February 2015; 19:00; Round 3	John O'Dwyer (0-4 frees); Noel McNamara (1-1); Aidan Walsh (0-3); Bill Cooper, John Cronin (0-2); Jack Herlihy, Conor Hammersley (0-1)	Report	Ross King (0-8, 0-6 frees); Oisin Ó'Ruairc (1-1), Colm Cronin (0-1)	CIT; Referee: Gavin Quilty

10 February 2015; 18:30; Round 3	DCU	1-20 - 0-11	St. Pat's, Drumcondra	DCU Sportsgrounds; Referee: James McGrah
10 February 2015; 18:30; Round 3	D Breathnach (0-12, 0-7 frees, 0-3 65's); P Brehony (0-4); G Bailey (1-0); C Boland, T French, P Burke, N O'Connor (0-1)	Report	P Sutton (0-6, 0-5 frees); C Morris (0-2); C Breathnach, C Joyce, W Murphy (0-1)	DCU Sportsgrounds; Referee: James McGrah

=== Group B ===
Pos	Team	Pld	W	D	L	SF	SA	Diff	Pts
1	UL	3	2	1	0	3-59	2-34	28	5
2	NUI Galway	3	2	0	1	0-47	2-55	-14	4
3	UCC	3	1	1	1	4-52	1-43	18	3
4	GMIT	3	0	0	3	1-31	3-57	-32	0

29 January 2015; 14:00; Round 1	UCC	3-19 - 0-8	GMIT	Mardyke, UCC; Referee: John O'Brien
29 January 2015; 14:00; Round 1	B Lawton (0-7, 0-4 frees); C Lehane, S O'Donnell, A Cadogan (1-2 each); J Barron (0-2); R O’Shea, D Roche, T Devine, A Spillane (0-1 each).	Report	C O'Donnell (0-4, 0-3 frees, 0-1 '65); T Haran (0-2, 0-1 sideline cut); S Lawless, J Flynn (0-1 each).	Mardyke, UCC; Referee: John O'Brien

29 January 2015; 14:00; Round 1	UL	2-24 - 0-9	NUI Galway	Dangan, NUIG; Referee: Fergal Horgan
29 January 2015; 14:00; Round 1	J Forde 0-10 (0-4f); K O'Brien 2-1; T Kelly 0-4; B Stapleton 0-3; J McGrath 0-2; S O’Gorman, C Martin, M Carmody, PJ Scully 0-1 each.	Report	B Duggan 0-4 (0-2f, 1'65); N O'Brien 0-2; S Hynes, E Brannigan, G Hennelly 0-1 each	Dangan, NUIG; Referee: Fergal Horgan

5 February 2015; 14:00; Round 2	NUI Galway	0-21 - 0-19	UCC	Dangan, NUIG; Referee: Paud O'Dwyer
5 February 2015; 14:00; Round 2	B Duggan (0-12, 0-7 frees); N O'Brien (0-4); E Brannigan, K Ryan, G Hennelly, C Mannion, B O'Connor (0-1)	Report	C Lehane (0-9, 0-5 frees, 0-1 sideline, 0-1 '65); J Power (0-4); B Lawton (0-3 frees); S O'Donnell, A Cadogan, A Spillane (0-1)	Dangan, NUIG; Referee: Paud O'Dwyer

5 February 2015; 13:00; Round 2	UL	0-21 - 1-11	GMIT	UL; Referee: Brian Gavin
5 February 2015; 13:00; Round 2	T Kelly (0-7, 0-3 frees); K O'Brien (0-5, 0-1 free); J Forde (0-4, 0-2 frees); PJ Scully (1-1); T Heffernan (0-3); J McGrath (0-2); D McInerney, D Quinn (0-1)	Report	T Haran (0-7, 0-6 frees, 0-1 sideline); J Flynn (1-3); D Burke (0-1);	UL; Referee: Brian Gavin

10 February 2015; 14:00; Round 3	NUI Galway	0-17 - 0-12	GMIT	Carnmore, Galway; Referee: David Hughes
10 February 2015; 14:00; Round 3	B Duggan (0-8, 0-7 frees); C Mannion (0-4); N O'Brien (0-2); S Ward, S Cooney, C Cleary (0-1)	Report	T Haran (0-9 frees); C O'Donnell, D Conroy, G Brennan (0-1 )	Carnmore, Galway; Referee: David Hughes

10 February 2015; 14:00; Round 3	UCC	1-14 - 1-14	UL	Mardyke, UCC; Referee: Fergal Horgan
10 February 2015; 14:00; Round 3	B Lawton (1-3, 0-2 frees); A Cadogan (0-4); C Lehane (0-2); C Murphy, A Spillane, P Prendergast, S O'Keeffe, J Power (0-1)	Report	C Martin (1-3, 0-3 frees); T Kelly (0-5); B Stapleton, J McGrath, T Heffernan, K O'Brien, PJ Scully (0-1); J Forde (0-1 free)	Mardyke, UCC; Referee: Fergal Horgan

=== Group C ===
Pos	Team	Pld	W	D	L	SF	SA	Diff	Pts
1	WIT	3	2	0	1	9-58	2-32	47	4
2	IT Carlow	3	2	0	1	9-33	4-16	32	4
3	Mary I Limerick	3	2	0	1	6-37	1-16	36	4
4	Maynooth University	3	0	0	3	2-13	19-77	-115	0

29 January 2015; 19:00; Round 1	WIT	3-13 - 0-9	IT Carlow	IT Carlow; Referee: James Owens
29 January 2015; 19:00; Round 1	P Mahony 0-8 (0-5f, 0-2 65s), L McGrath 1-2, A Glesson, C O’Brien 1-0 each, G O’Brien, H Kehoe, J Dillon 0-1 each.	Report	S Maher 0-7 (0-6f, 0-1 65), C Bolger, J Fagan 0-1 each.	IT Carlow; Referee: James Owens

7 February 2015; 14:00; Round 1	Mary I Limerick	4-18 - 1-6	Maynooth University	Maynooth University; Referee: James Owens
7 February 2015; 14:00; Round 1	S Cahill (2-1); D Reidy (0-7 frees); D Corry, D Hannon (1-0), T Gallagher, S Curran (0-2); D O'Donovan (0-2, 0-1 sideline, 0-1 free); J Meaghar, R English, S Linnane, J Hannon (0-1)	Report	A Gleeson (0-5, 0-4 free); S Farrelly (1-0); J White (0-1)	Maynooth University; Referee: James Owens

- Maynooth University v Mary I Limerick was initially scheduled for 29 January 2014 but postponed due to snow

5 February 2015; 19:00; Round 2	IT Carlow	9-24 - 1-3	Maynooth University	Maynooth University North Campus; Referee: Alan Kelly
5 February 2015; 19:00; Round 2	C Bolger (3-1); J Fagan (1-6); I Byrne (2-1, 1-1 frees); S Maher (1-4, 0-3 frees, 0-1 '65); K Kelly (1-3); A Fogarty (0-4, 0-1 free, 0-1 '65); M Kavanagh (1-0); J Doyle (0-3); C Doughan (0-2, 0-1f)	Report	C Fenlon (1-0); J Maher (0-2, 0-1 free); C Chan (0-1 free)	Maynooth University North Campus; Referee: Alan Kelly

5 February 2015; 14:30; Round 2	Mary I Limerick	2-19 - 0-10	WIT	MICL Grounds; Referee: Cathal Mc Allister
5 February 2015; 14:30; Round 2	D Reidy (0-8, 0-5 frees, 0-1 '65); D Corry, D O'Donovan (1-1); S Kennedy (0-4); D Hannon (0-2); S Cahill, T Gallagher, N O'Meara (0-1)	Report	P Mahony (0-7, 0-5 frees); M O'Neill (0-2, 0-1 free); G O'Brien (0-1)	MICL Grounds; Referee: Cathal Mc Allister

10 February 2015; 19:00; Round 3	WIT	6-35 - 0-4	Maynooth University	WIT; Referee: Diarmuid Kirwin
10 February 2015; 19:00; Round 3	Pauric Mahony (2-18, 0-12 frees); Austin Gleeson (2-3); Jack Langton (1-3); Liam McGrath (1-2); Martin O'Neill (0-3); Gavin O'Brien, Jake Dillon (0-2); Joe O'Dwyer, Stephen Roche (0-1)			WIT; Referee: Diarmuid Kirwin

10 February 2015; 19:00; Round 3	IT Carlow	4-17 - 1-17	Mary I Limerick	IT Carlow; Referee: Johnny Ryan
10 February 2015; 19:00; Round 3	Stephen Maher (1-10, 0-4 frees); Chris Bolger (2-0); Jack Fagan (1-2); Conor Doughan (0-2 frees); Aidan Fogarty, Kevin Kelly, James Doyle (0-1)	Report	David Reidy (0-5 frees); Declan Hannon (1-2); Ronan Maher, Daragh Corry, Stephen Cahill (0-2); Seamus Kennedy, Daragh O'Donovan (0-1)	IT Carlow; Referee: Johnny Ryan

- Having won the original fixture by 4-17 to 1-17, IT Carlow were later found guilty of playing an illegal player. James Gannon was deemed to be a part-time student and therefore ineligible. The fixture was retrospectively awarded to Mary I Limerick. This meant that Carlow IT finished third in Group C. IT Carlow then won an appeal against this decision and were re-awarded the fixture despite another late Mary I Limerick request for an interlocutory injunction to the DRA.

=== Group D ===
Pos	Team	Pld	W	D	L	SF	SA	Diff	Pts
1	Limerick IT	2	2	0	0	2-35	1-24	14	4
2	DIT	2	1	0	1	2-35	1-38	-4	2
3	UUJ	2	0	0	2	0-31	2-39	-10	0

29 January 2015; 15:00; Round 1	Limerick IT	1-17 - 0-11	UUJ	LIT; Referee: Alan Kelly
29 January 2015; 15:00; Round 1	S O'Halloran (0-2), P Flaherty (0-1), S O'Brien (0-4), D Reidy (0-10f), P Killeen (1-1), M Fitzgerald (0-1), P Fitzgerald (0-1), M Gennery (0-1)	Report	M Bradley (0-1), M Duddley (0-1), C Johnson (0-1f), D Toner (0-1), C Clarke (0-8, 6f)	LIT; Referee: Alan Kelly

5 February 2015; 14:00; Round 2	Limerick IT	1-18 - 1-13	DIT	Parnells GAA, Coolock; Referee: Fergal Horgan
5 February 2015; 14:00; Round 2	D Reidy (0-8 frees); P Killeen (1-2); S O'Brien, A Dempsey (0-2), A Murphy (0-1 free); W Ryan, P Flaherty, M Fitzgerald, P Fitzgerald (0-1)	Report	J Guiney (0-9, 0-7 frees); M Lee (1-0); J McManus (0-2); D McNicholas, C Sheehan (0-1)	Parnells GAA, Coolock; Referee: Fergal Horgan

10 February 2015; 14:00; Round 3	DIT	1-22 - 0-20	UUJ	Jordanstown; Referee: Eamon Hassan
10 February 2015; 14:00; Round 3	D McNicholas (1-4); J Guiney (0-7, 0-2 frees); M Lee (0-4); C Sheehan (0-2); J Cahill, J Sweeney, G Whelan, W McGrath, D Roberts (0-1)	Report	C Clarke (0-5, 0-3 frees); D Casey (0-4); D Toner (0-3); C Johnson (0-3, 0-1 free); D McKernan (0-2); S McAfee, M Bradley, E McCloskey (0-1)	Jordanstown; Referee: Eamon Hassan

=== Quarter-finals ===
Group winners had home advantage for the quarter-finals.

18 February 2015; 14:00; Quarter-final	CIT	0-19 - 0-10	NUI Galway	CIT; Referee: Brian Gavin
18 February 2015; 14:00; Quarter-final	J O'Dwyer (0-8, 0-4 frees); C Hammersley, J Cronin, K Kavanagh, D Lordan (0-2); N McNamara, P White (0-1)	Report	B Duggan (0-5, 0-1 free, 0-1 '65), C Mannion (0-2, 0-1 free); N O'Brien, G Hennelly, S Ward (0-1)	CIT; Referee: Brian Gavin

18 February 2015; 15:00; Quarter-final	UL	0-18 - 0-15	UCD	UL; Referee: Barry Kelly
18 February 2015; 15:00; Quarter-final	John McGrath (0-7, 0-5 frees); Conor Martin (0-4, 0-1 frees); Tommy Heffernan (0-2); Jason Forde (0-2, 0-1 free, 0-1 '65); Brian Stapleton, Dan Morrissey, Stephen Bennett (0-1)	Report	Ross King (0-6 frees); Conor Devitt, Pat Purcell (0-2), Conor O'Shea (0-1 free); Jack O'Connor, Colm Cronin, Garrett Sinnott, Dillon Mulligan (0-1)	UL; Referee: Barry Kelly

24 February 2015; 19:00; Quarter-final	WIT	1-18 - 1-7	DIT	Carriganore; Referee: Johnny Ryan
24 February 2015; 19:00; Quarter-final	Pauric Mahony (0-8, 0-6 frees); Stephen Roche (1-1); Austin Gleeson (0-3); Gavin O'Brien, Liam McGrath (0-2); Jack Dillon, Johnny Hayes (0-1)	Report	Jack Guiney (1-6, 0-5 frees); Conor Sheehan (0-1)	Carriganore; Referee: Johnny Ryan

24 February 2015; 14:00; Quarter-final	Limerick IT	1-15 - 0-14	IT Carlow	LIT; Referee: Alan Kelly
24 February 2015; 14:00; Quarter-final	David Reidy (1-8, 0-5 frees, 0-1 '65, 0-1 penalty); Paul Flaherty (0-3); Barry O'Connell, Alan Dempsey, Seanie O'Brien, Joe Campion (0-1)	Report	Kevin Kelly (0-8 frees); Conor Doughan (0-3, 0-2 frees, 0-1 '65); Jack Fagan, Chris Bolger, Garry Keegan (0-1)	LIT; Referee: Alan Kelly

=== Semi-finals ===
27 February 2015; 13:00; Semi-final	WIT	1-20 - 0-19; AET	CIT	LIT; Referee: Fergal Horgan
27 February 2015; 13:00; Semi-final	J O'Dwyer (0-5, 0-3 frees, 0-1 '65); C Buckley (0-3); A Walsh, J Cronin, B Cooper, N McNamara (0-2); D Lordan (0-2, 0-1 free); K Kavanagh (0-1)	Report	A Gleeson (1-6, 0-1 sideline); P Mahony (0-8, 0-5 frees, 0-1 '65); G O'Brien (0-4); J Dillon, J Hayes (0-1)	LIT; Referee: Fergal Horgan

27 February 2015; 15:00; Semi-final	UL	2-18 - 1-14	Limerick IT	LIT; Referee: James McGrath
27 February 2015; 15:00; Semi-final	Jason Forde (1-3, 0-1 sideline); John McGrath (0-4 frees), Stephen Bennett (1-0); David McInerney, Cathal McInerney (0-3); Kevin O'Brien (0-2); Tommy Heffernan, Conor Martin, Dan Morrissey (0-1)	Report	David Reidy (0-8, 0-7 frees); Willie Ryan (1-0); Paul Killeen, Martin Fitzgerald (0-2); Paul Flaherty, Seanie O'Brien (0-1)	LIT; Referee: James McGrath

=== Final ===
28 February 2015; 19:30; Final	WIT	0-21 - 3-12; AET	UL	Gaelic Grounds, Limerick; Referee: Brian Gavin
28 February 2015; 19:30; Final	Pauric Mahony (0-8, 0-5 frees, 0-1 '65); Johnny Hayes (0-3); Tom Fox, Martin O'Neill, Jake Dillon (0-2); Austin Gleeson (0-2, 0-1 sideline); Harry Kehoe, Tomas Hamill (0-1)	Report	John McGrath (0-5, 0-3 frees); Tommy Heffernan (1-1); Jason Forde (1-1, 0-1 free); Stephen Bennett (1-0); Tony Kelly (0-2, 0-1 free); Kevin O'Brien, Cathal McInerney, PJ Scully (0-1)	Gaelic Grounds, Limerick; Referee: Brian Gavin

11 March 2015; 19:30; Final Replay	UL	2-18 - 1-14	WIT	Páirc Uí Rinn, Cork; Referee: Barry Kelly
11 March 2015; 19:30; Final Replay	Tony Kelly (0-6, 0-2 frees); John McGrath (0-6, 0-4 frees); Tommy Heffernan (1-1); Daire Quinn (1-0); Kevin O'Brien (0-2); Conor Martin, Cathal McInerney (0-1); Jason Forde (0-1 sideline)	Report	Pauric Mahony (0-8, 0-5 frees, 0-1 '65); Gavin O'Brien (1-2); Tom Fox, Harry Kehoe, Jake Dillon, Johnny Hayes (0-1)	Páirc Uí Rinn, Cork; Referee: Barry Kelly
