= David Fitzgerald (hurler) =

Irish hurler (born 1996)

Personal information
- Native name: Daithí Mac Gearailt (Irish)
- Born: 1996 (age 29–30) Inagh, County Clare, Ireland
- Occupation: Aircraft Finance
- Height: 6 ft 4 in (193 cm)

Sport
- Sport: Hurling
- Position: midfielder
Club
- Years: Club
- Inagh-Kilnamona
Club titles
- Clare titles: 1
College
- Years: College
- University of Limerick University College Dublin
College titles
- Fitzgibbon titles: 1
Inter-county*
Years	County	Apps (scores)
2016-present	Clare	57 (4-61)
Inter-county titles
- Munster titles: 0
- All-Irelands: 1
- NHL: 2
- All Stars: 1
- *Inter County team apps and scores correct as of 17:16, 06 November 2025.

David Fitzgerald (born 1996) is an Irish hurler who plays as a midfielder for club side Inagh-Kilnamona and at inter-county level with the Clare senior hurling team.

On 21 July 2024, he started in midfield as Clare won the All-Ireland for the first time in 11 years after an extra-time win against Cork by 3–29 to 1-34, claiming their fifth All-Ireland title. Fitzgerald won an All Star at the end of the 2024 season.

== Career statistics ==
=== Inter-county ===
As of match played 28 April 2024

Team	Year	National League			Munster		All-Ireland		Total	
Team	Year	Division	Apps	Score	Apps	Score	Apps	Score	Apps	Score
Clare	2016	Division 1B	5	0-00	1	0-01	3	0-00	9	0-01
Clare	2017	Division 1A	6	0-04	2	0-00	1	0-00	9	0-04
Clare	2018	Division 1A	5	0-02	5	0-03	3	0-01	13	0-06
Clare	2019	Division 1A	5	0-02	4	0-01	-		9	0-03
Clare	2020	Division 1A	3	0-05	1	0-00	2	0-01	6	0-06
Clare	2021	Division 1B	5	0-04	2	0-00	0	0-00	7	0-04
Clare	2022	Division 1A	4	0-06	5	2-14	2	0-04	11	2-24
Clare	2023	Division 1A	5	0-14	4	0-07	2	0-07	11	0-28
Clare	2024	Division 1A	6	2-16	2	1-03			8	3-19
Total			44	2-53	26	3-29	13	0-13	83	5-95

== Honours ==
University of Limerick

- Fitzgibbon Cup (1): 2018

Inagh-Kilnamona

- Clare Senior Hurling Championship: 2026

Clare

- All-Ireland Senior Hurling Championship (1): 2024
- National Hurling League (2): 2016, 2024

Awards

- The Sunday Game Team of the Year (3): 2022, 2023, 2024
- All-Star Award (2): 2022, 2024
