= Players Champions Cup =

- Logo of the 2019 event
- Code: Hurling
- Founded: 2015
- Trophy: Players Champions Cup
- No. of teams: 4
- Title holders: Kilkenny (1st title)
- Most titles: Galway, Clare, Limerick, Kilkenny (first titles)
- Sponsors: Aer Lingus

The Players Champions Cup is the trophy awarding to the winner of a hurling competition held periodically in the United States. It has been staged three times as the Fenway Hurling Classic in Boston, Massachusetts, and once as the New York Hurling Classic in Queens, New York. The first two editions were sponsored by AIG, while the most recent editions have been sponsored by Aer Lingus.

== Format ==
Matches are played in the Super 11’s format, which only permits goals to be scored, not points. Goals scored inside the 20 yards (18 m) exclusion zone are worth three points, else five points from outside. The 2015 event was a single match, divided into four 15-minute quarters with unlimited substitutions. Later events have had two semi-final matches then a final match, all held on the same day, with matches divided into two 20-minutes halves. Yellow cards result in a two-minute spell in the sin bin and frees are taken on a tap-and-go basis. A team has 30 seconds after gaining possession to attempt a shot at goal. This is reduced to 20 seconds in the final two minutes of each period. The dimensions of the pitch are 100 yards (91 m) x 53 yards (48 m)—the size of a gridiron football pitch, without the end zones—which is laid into halves, with a defensive zone marked by a line drawn 20 yards (18 m) from each goal line.

== Results ==
=== 2015 ===
This was the first time that hurling was played at Fenway Park since November 1954, when Cork defeated an American team. With Galway facing Dublin in the event's only match, the contest was marred by a brawl in the second quarter in front of the Dublin goal. A bout of pushing and shoving quickly started with players throwing punches, wrestling on the ground. Galway's Iarla Tannian and Andy Smith along with Dublin's Conor Dooley were all yellow-carded. Each side was later fined €5,000 by the Central Competitions Control Committee of the GAA.

Fenway Hurling Classic
22 November 2015
13:00

Galway	50 – 47	Dublin
J Flynn (18), C Whelan (12), B Molloy (11), C Mannion (3), G Lally (3), S Moloney (3)	Report	E Dillon (17), F McGibb (10), D Sutcliffe (6), N McMorrow (5), D O'Callaghan (3), J McCaffrey (3), C McBride (3)

Fenway Park, Boston
Attendance: 27,776
Referee: A Kelly (Galway)

=== 2017 ===
The 2017 competition took place on 19 November at Fenway Park and was a doubleheader with Dublin playing Galway and Tipperary playing Clare in the Super 11's format. The winners of the two semi-finals played in the final for the Players Championship Cup. Clare defeated Galway in the final 50–33 to win the Players Champions Cup.

Fenway Hurling Classic
19 November 2017
12:30
Semi Final

Galway	55 – 39	Dublin
Jason Flynn (20), Conor Cooney (10), Padraig Breheny (9), Shane Moloney (5), Davy Glennon (5), Conor Whelan (3), Joseph Cooney (3)	Report	Danny Sutcliffe (8), John Hetherton (8), Donal Burke (5), Fergal Whitely (3), Paul Crummy (3), James Madden (3), Emmet McKenna (3), Cian O'Sullivan (3), Paul Winters (3)

Fenway Park, Boston
Referee: Johnny Ryan (Tipperary)
Fenway Hurling Classic
19 November 2017
13:30
Semi Final

Tipperary	45 – 50	Clare
J McGrath 16, N McGrath 10, C Kenny 6, J O'Dwyer, G Browne 5 each, S Curran 3	Report	P Duggan 25, T Kelly 8, C McGrath 6, I Galvin 5, D Fitzgerald, D Corry 3 each

Fenway Park, Boston
Referee: A Kelly (Galway)
Fenway Hurling Classic
19 November 2017
15:00
Final

Galway	33 – 50	Clare
C Cooney 13, J Flynn 6, E Burke 5, Whelan, P Flaherty, S Maloney 3 each	Report	P Duggan 27, C O'Connell, J Conlon 6 each, D McInerney 5, D Correy, J Browne 3 each

Fenway Park, Boston
Attendance: 27,862
Referee: D Kirwan (Cork)

=== 2018 ===
The 2018 competition took place at Fenway Park on 18 November and was a doubleheader with Cork playing Clare and Limerick playing Wexford in the Super 11's format. The winners of the two semi-finals played in the final for the Players Championship Cup, with Limerick defeating Cork.

Fenway Hurling Classic
18 November 2018
12:45
Semi Final

Cork	42 – 37	Clare
P Horgan 20, D Kearney 10, B Cooper 6, T O’Mahony 6	Report	T Kelly 13, P Duggan 9, S O'Donnell 6, D Conroy 6, P Collins 3

Fenway Park, Boston
Referee: J Murphy (Limerick)
Fenway Hurling Classic
18 November 2018
13:50
Semi Final

Wexford	45 – 53	Limerick
L Chin 11, Jack O'Connor 10, P Morris 8, H Kehoe 6, K Foley 5, S Casey 5	Report	P Ryan 15, C Lynch 8, G Mulcahy 8, A Gillane 8, D Byrnes 5, G Hegarty 3, K Hayes 3, T Morrissey 3

Fenway Park, Boston
Referee: C Lyons (Cork)
Fenway Hurling Classic
18 November 2018
15:10
Final

Limerick	38 – 30	Cork
B Murphy 13, C Lynch 10, T Morrissey 9, K Hayes 3, A la Touche Cosgrave 3	Report	P Horgan 16, B Cooper 6, S Kingston 5, C Lehane 3

Fenway Park, Boston
Attendance: 12,674
Referee: S Cleere (Kilkenny)

=== 2019 ===
The 2019 competition was held at Citi Field in Queens on 16 November. In first-round games, defending champion Limerick defeated Wexford, and event newcomer Kilkenny defeated Tipperary. In the final, Kilkenny took a 34–22 halftime lead over Limerick, and continued on to a 64–40 win.

New York Hurling Classic
16 November 2019
12:30
Semi Final

Limerick	52 – 20	Wexford
A Costello 8, G Hegarty 6 (1 pen), B Hennessy 6 (1 pen), S Flanagan 6, D O’Donovan 4, P O'Loughlin 4, P Ryan 4	Report	C Dunbar 6 (1 pen), S Murphy 6, D Reck 4, P Morris 4

Citi Field, Queens
New York Hurling Classic
16 November 2019
13:30
Semi Final

Kilkenny	86 – 36	Tipperary
B Ryan 20, G Alylward 18 (1 pen), W Walsh 12, R Leahy 8, J Maher 8, L Blanchfield 6 (1 pen), A Murphy 6, M Carey 4, C Browne 4	Report	S Callanan 14 (1 pen), J Forde 10, C Darcy 4, M Breen 4, J Morris 4

Citi Field, Queens
New York Hurling Classic
16 November 2019
14:50
Final

Kilkenny	64 – 40	Limerick
A Murphy 24 (3 pen), B Ryan 18 (1 pen), C Fogarty 6, G Alylward 4, L Blanchfield 4, M Cody 4, L Scanlon 4	Report	P Ryan 16 (2 pen), C Ryan 8, P O’Loughlin 4, G Hegarty 4, D Hannon 4, A Costello 4

Citi Field, Queens
Attendance: 11,214

== Appearances ==
Includes all matches played through the 2019 event.

Team	Wins	Losses	Win pct.	Years played
Kilkenny	2	0	1.000	2019
Limerick	3	1	.750	2018, 2019
Clare	2	1	.667	2017, 2018
Galway	2	1	.667	2015, 2017
Cork	1	1	.500	2018
Tipperary	0	2	.000	2017, 2019
Wexford	0	2	.000	2018, 2019
Dublin	0	2	.000	2015, 2017

Championship years are denoted by bold type.
