= Mick Moroney =

Clare hurler

Personal information
- Native name: Mícheál Ó Maolruanaidh (Irish)
- Born: 1950 (age 75–76) Crusheen, County Clare, Ireland

Sport
- Sport: Hurling
- Position: Midfield
Club
- Years: Club
- Crusheen
Club titles
- Clare titles: 0
Inter-county
Years	County	Apps (scores)
1970–1979	Clare	17 (1–27)
Inter-county titles
- Munster titles: 0
- All-Irelands: 0
- NHL: 2
- All Stars: 1

Michael Moroney (born 1950) is an Irish former hurler who played as a midfielder for the Clare senior team.

Moroney made his debut for the team during the 1970 championship, and was a semi-regular member of the starting fifteen until his retirement after the 1979 championship. During that time he won two National League winners' medals and one All-Star award.

At club level Moroney played with Crusheen.
