= Ian Galvin =

Irish hurler

Personal information
- Native name: Iain Ó Gealbháin (Irish)
- Born: 1996 (age 29–30) Clonlara, County Clare, Ireland
- Occupation: Accountant
- Height: 5 ft 9 in (175 cm)

Sport
- Sport: Hurling
- Position: Right corner-forward
Club
- Years: Club
- Clonlara
Club titles
- Clare titles: 0
College
- Years: College
- 2015-2019: University of Limerick
College titles
- Fitzgibbon titles: 1
Inter-county*
Years	County	Apps (scores)
2017-present	Clare	8 (2-11)
Inter-county titles
- Munster titles: 0
- All-Irelands: 1
- NHL: 1
- All Stars: 0
- *Inter County team apps and scores correct as of 22:29, 5 July 2021.

Ian Galvin is an Irish hurler who plays for the Clare senior team. He is the brother of fellow Clare hurler Colm Galvin. He made his first National Hurling League start for Clare on 12 March 2017 against Dublin in the 2017 National Hurling League where he scored three points.

== Career statistics ==
As of 3 July 2021

Team	Year	National League			Leinster		All-Ireland		Total	
Team	Year	Division	Apps	Score	Apps	Score	Apps	Score	Apps	Score
Clare	2017	Division 1A	3	0-07	1	0-01	0	0-00	4	0-08
Clare	2018	Division 1A	4	0-02	2	1-00	3	0-05	9	1-07
Clare	2019	Division 1A	5	0-08	0	0-00	—		5	0-08
Clare	2020	Division 1B	3	0-02	0	0-00	0	0-00	3	0-02
Clare	2021	Division 1B	4	0-03	2	1-05	0	0-00	6	1-08
Career total			19	0-22	5	2-06	3	0-05	27	2-33

== Honours ==
Ardscoil Rís

- Harty Cup: 2014

University of Limerick

- Fitzgibbon Cup: 2018
- All-Ireland Freshers' Hurling Championship: 2015

Clonlara

- Clare Senior B Hurling Championship: 2020

Clare

- All-Ireland Senior Hurling Championship: 2024
- National Hurling League: 2024
