= Cathal Malone =

Irish hurler (born 1992)

Personal information
- Native name: Cathal Ó Maoileoin (Irish)
- Born: 1992 (age 33–34) Lahinch, County Clare, Ireland
- Occupation: Secondary school teacher
- Height: 6 ft 4 in (193 cm)

Sport
- Sport: Hurling
- Position: Midfield
Clubs
- Years: Club
- Ennistymon; Sixmilebridge
Club titles
- Clare titles: 4
College
- Years: College
- 2010-2014: University of Limerick
College titles
- Fitzgibbon titles: 0
Inter-county
- Years: County
- 2014-present: Clare
Inter-county titles
- Munster titles: 0
- All-Irelands: 1
- NHL: 2
- All Stars: 0

Cathal Malone (born 1992) is an Irish hurler who plays for Clare Senior Championship club Sixmilebridge and at inter-county level with the Clare senior hurling team. He usually lines out at midfield.

== Career ==
Malone first played hurling to a high standard as a student at St. Flannan's College in Ennis. He lined out for the college in all grades, including the Harty Cup. Malone later played with the University of Limerick in the Fitzgibbon Cup.

At club level, Malone first enjoyed success as a Gaelic footballer with the Ennistymon club, winning a Clare U21AFC medal in 2010. The absence of a senior hurling team in Ennistymon resulted in Malone joining the Sixmilebridge club. He has since won four Clare SHC medals.

Malone first appeared on the inter-county scene with Clare at minor level. He was right wing-forward on the team beaten by Kilkenny in the 2010 All-Ireland minor final. Malone progressed to the under-21 team and won back-to-back All-Ireland U21HC medals as a substitute in 2012 and on the field of play in 2013.

Malone was just a year out of the under-21 grade when he was drafted onto the senior team. He was a member of the Clare team that won the National League title in 2016. Malone was nominated for All-Stars in 2020 and 2021.

On 21 July 2024, he started in midfield as Clare won the All-Ireland for the first time in 11 years after an extra-time win against Cork by 3–29 to 1-34, claiming their fifth All-Ireland title.

== Honours ==
Ennistymon

- Clare Under-21 A Football Championship: 2010

Clare Under-21 C Hurling Championship: 2010

Sixmilebridge

- Clare Senior Hurling Championship: 2015, 2017, 2019, 2020

Clare

- All-Ireland Senior Hurling Championship: 2024
- National Hurling League: 2016, 2024
- All-Ireland Under-21 Hurling Championship: 2012, 2013
- Munster Under-21 Hurling Championship: 2012, 2013
- Munster Minor Hurling Championship: 2010
