= Shane Golden =

Irish hurler

Personal information
- Native name: Seán Ó Góilín (Irish)
- Born: 1991 (age 34–35) Sixmilebridge, County Clare, Ireland
- Height: 6 ft 2 in (188 cm)

Sport
- Sport: Hurling
- Position: Midfield
Club
- Years: Club
- Sixmilebridge
Club titles
- Clare titles: 4
College
- Years: College
- University of Limerick
College titles
- Fitzgibbon titles: 0
Inter-county
- Years: County
- 2013-present: Clare
Inter-county titles
- Munster titles: 0
- All-Irelands: 0
- NHL: 1
- All Stars: 0

Shane Golden (born 1991) is an Irish hurler who plays for Clare Senior Championship club Sixmilebridge and at inter-county level with the Clare senior hurling team. He usually lines out at midfield.

== Honours ==
Sixmilebridge

- Clare Senior Hurling Championship (4): 2013, 2015, 2017, 2019

Clare

- National Hurling League (1): 2016
- All-Ireland Under-21 Hurling Championship (1): 2012
- Munster Under-21 Hurling Championship (1): 2012
