= Seán Stack =

Clare hurler

Personal information
- Native name: Seán de Staic (Irish)
- Born: 1953 (age 72–73) Listowel, County Kerry, Ireland
- Occupation: Retired secondary school teacher

Sport
- Sport: Hurling
- Position: Centre-back
Club
- Years: Club
- 1971–1994: Sixmilebridge
Club titles
- Clare titles: 7
- Munster titles: 1
College
- Years: College
- 1972–1977: St Patrick's College
College titles
- Fitzgibbon titles: 2
Inter-county*
Years	County	Apps (scores)
1974–1987	Clare	28 (0–1)
Inter-county titles
- Munster titles: 0
- All-Irelands: 0
- NHL: 2
- All Stars: 1
- *Inter County team apps and scores correct as of 20:35, 22 April 2015.

Seán Stack (born 1953) is an Irish former hurler who played as a centre-back for the Clare senior team.

Born in Listowel, County Kerry, Stack first played competitive hurling during his schooling at St Flannan's College. He arrived on the inter-county scene at the age of seventeen when he first linked up with the Clare minor team, before joining the under-21, junior and intermediate sides. He made his senior debut during the 1974 championship. Stack immediately became a regular member of the starting fifteen and won two National Hurling League medals. He was a Munster runner-up on five occasions.

As a member of the Munster inter-provincial team on a number of occasions, Stack won two Railway Cup medal. At club level he is a one-time Munster medallist with Sixmilebridge. In addition to this he has also seven championship medals.

Throughout his career Stack made 28 championship appearances. His retirement came following the conclusion of the 1987 championship.

In retirement from playing Stack became involved in team management and coaching. At inter-county level he was trainer of the Clare under-21 team before later serving as a selector. At club level Stack has taken charge of numerous club teams including Sixmilebridge, Clonlara, Toomevara and Na Piarsaigh.

During Stack's playing days, and in spite of a lack of championship success, he won one All-Star award. He has been repeatedly voted onto teams made up of the sport's greats, including at centre-back on a special non-All-Ireland-winning Team of the Century in 1984. Stack was also chosen as one of the 125 greatest hurlers of all-time in a 2009 poll, before being included on a special Team of the 1980s in 2013.

== Biography ==
Stack was born in Listowel, County Kerry, in 1953. His father was a native of Kerry while his mother hailed from Glin, County Limerick. Stack spent the first year of his life in Listowel before moving to Glin for three years. In 1957, his father purchased a farm of 97 acres (39 ha) near Sixmilebridge, County Clare.

Stack was educated locally and first came to prominence on the hurling field at school and college (St Patrick's College, Maynooth). He later moved the United States where he spent a number of years working.

Stack’s son, also named Seán, is a hurling referee and on the inter-county panel, representing Dublin.

== Playing career ==
=== University ===
During his studies at St Patrick's College in Maynooth, Stack was an automatic inclusion on the college hurling team. In 1973 he was at left wing-back as St Patrick's faced University College Galway in the inter-varsities final. A narrow 2–12 to 4–4 victory gave Stack a first Fitzgibbon Cup medal.

St Patrick's reached the decider for a second successive year in 1974. A 2–10 to 1–7 defeat of University College Dublin secured a second successive Fitzgibbon Cup medal for Stack.

Stack was also a regular member of the starting fifteen over the next three years; however, St Patrick's faced defeat in three successive championship deciders.

=== Club ===
Stack was still a minor when he was drafted onto the Sixmilebridge senior team in 1971. He was at left wing-forward as Sixmilebridge faced Tubber in the intermediate decider. Stack top scored with 1–2 as Sixmilebridge secured promotion to the senior ranks following a 4–14 to 4–4 victory.

After defeat in the senior decider in 1976, Sixmilebridge returned to contest a second successive county final the following year against Kilkishen. Mickey White was the hero for Sixmilebridge as he lofted the winning point seventy five seconds from the final whistle to secure a narrow 1–6 to 1–5 victory. Not only was it a first championship medal for Stack, who had the honour of captaining the team, but it was a first title for Sixmilebridge.

Two-in-a-row proved beyond Sixmilebridge, however, the team contested the decider again in 1979.

Despite playing against the breeze in the first half Sixmilebridge led by 2–4 to 0–5. The Bridge powered on in the second half to claim a 5–11 to 0–9 victory over St. Brendan's. It was Stack's second championship medal.

Éire Óg defeated Sixmilebridge in the 1982 decider, however, both sides were back in the final again the following year. After a 1–10 to 3–4 draw, Sixmilebridge triumphed in the replay following a 1–10 to 1–7 victory. It was Stack's third championship medal.

The centenary year of the Gaelic Athletic Association saw Sixmilebridge make history by retaining the title. A narrow 3–7 to 1–12 defeat of Clarecastle courtesy of a late Gerry McInerney goal gave Stack, who was captain and manager of the team, a fourth championship medal. He later secured a Munster medal following a 4–10 to 2–6 defeat of Patrickswell.

After a five-year lapse Sixmilebridge claimed the championship again in 1989. A 3–14 to 1–11 defeat of Clarecastle gave Stack a fifth championship medal.

Stack secured a sixth championship medal in 1992 as Sixmilebridge defeated Éire Óg by 1–11 to 1–10.

For only the second time in the history of the club, Sixmilebridge retained the championship in 1993. A 3–8 to 2–6 defeat of O'Callaghan's Mills gave Stack a seventh championship medal. He retired from club hurling following a defeat by Toomevara in the subsequent provincial campaign.

=== Inter-county ===
Stack first arrived on the inter-county scene as a member of the Clare minor team. In 1971 he was captain of the side that faced a 6–13 to 3–5 walloping from Cork in the Munster decider.

After progressing onto the under-21 team he faced narrow Munster U21HC defeats at the hands of Tipperary in 1972 and Waterford in 1974.

Stack made his senior championship debut on 7 July 1974 in a narrow 1–8 to 1–7 Munster SHC semi-final defeat of Tipperary.

After a fifteen-point defeat by Kilkenny in the league final in 1976, both sides faced each other again at the same stage the following year. A 2–8 to 0–9 victory gave Clare the title and Stack a National Hurling League medal. Clare later faced Cork in the provincial decider, on a day when armed robbers made away with the takings from the gate of £24,579 during the second half of the game. Clare conceded an early penalty, but fought back to take the lead until a contentious red card for full back Jim Power turned the tide for Cork and they fought on win by 4–15 to 4–10.

Clare retained their league title in 1978, with Stack as captain collecting a second winners' medal following a 3–10 to 1–10 defeat of Kilkenny once again. In a repeat of the previous year, Clare faced Cork in the subsequent Munster SHC decider. In one of the worst ever provincial deciders and only the second one ever not to produce a goal, Clare were narrowly defeated by 0–13 to 0–11.

This defeat demoralised Clare; however, Stack lined out in another Munster SHC decider in 1981. A 3–12 to 2–9 defeat by Limerick was the result on that occasion; however, Stack ended the year by collecting a GAA All Star Award.

In 1986, Stack played in a fifth and final provincial decider. Victory eluded him for the fifth time, as Cork secured a 2–18 to 3–12 victory.

Stack retired from inter-county hurling following a league game against Wexford in early 1987.

=== Inter-provincial ===
Stack also lined out with Munster in the inter-provincial hurling competition. He first played for his province in 1980, however, Connacht were the victors on that occasion. Stack continued to play for his province for another few years and captured two Railway Cup medals in 1984 and 1985.

== Honours ==
=== Player ===
St Patrick's College

- Fitzgibbon Cup (2): 1973, 1974

Sixmilebridge

- Munster Senior Club Hurling Championship (1): 1984
- Clare Senior Hurling Championship (7): 1977 (c), 1979, 1983, 1984 (c), 1989, 1992, 1993
- Clare Intermediate Hurling Championship (1): 1971

Clare

- National Hurling League (2): 1976–77, 1977–78 (c)

Munster

- Railway Cup (2): 1984, 1985

=== Individual ===
Honours

- All-Star (1): 1981

=== Manager ===
Sixmilebridge

- Munster Senior Club Hurling Championship (1): 1984
- Clare Senior Hurling Championship (1): 1984

Toomevara

- Munster Senior Club Hurling Championship (1): 1993
- Tipperary Senior Hurling Championship (2): 1993, 2001

Na Piarsaigh

- Munster Senior Club Hurling Championship (2): 2011, 2013
- Limerick Senior Hurling Championship (2): 2011, 2013

Sporting positions
Preceded by John McNamara	Clare Senior Hurling Captain; 1978	Succeeded by
