= 1997 All-Ireland Minor Hurling Championship =

All-Ireland Minor Hurling Championship 1997
Championship Details
- Dates: 23 April 1997 – 14 September 1997
- Teams: 14

All Ireland Champions
- Winners: Clare (1st win)
- Captain: John Reddan
- Manager: Kevin Kennedy

All Ireland Runners-up
- Runners-up: Galway
- Captain: Eoin McDonagh
- Manager: John Fahey

Provincial Champions
- Munster: Tipperary
- Leinster: Kilkenny
- Ulster: Antrim
- Connacht: Not Played

Championship Statistics
- Matches Played: 16
- Top Scorer: Henry Shefflin (5-20)

The 1997 All-Ireland Minor Hurling Championship was the 67th staging of the All-Ireland Minor Hurling Championship since its establishment by the Gaelic Athletic Association in 1928. The championship began on 23 April 1997 and ended on 14 September 1997.

Tipperary entered the championship as the defending champions, however, they were defeated by Galway in the All-Ireland semi-final.

On 14 September 1997 Clare won the championship following a 1-11 to 1-9 defeat of Galway in the All-Ireland final. It was their first All-Ireland title and the first to be won by a team which was beaten in the earlier rounds.

Kilkenny's Henry Shefflin was the championship's top scorer with 5-20.

== The "back-door" system ==
Since its inception in 1928 the championship had been played on a straight knock-out basis. If any team was defeated at any stage of the provincial or All-Ireland competitions it meant automatic elimination. This system was deemed the fairest as the All-Ireland champions would always be the team who won all of their games. There were some problems with this system. Over the years Galway had become the only credible hurling team in Connacht, thus giving them an automatic pass into the All-Ireland semi-finals every year. Similarly in Ulster there were many problems as hurling was much weaker and confined to a small few counties in the north-east of the province.

In 1995 the Hurling Development Committee began investigating a way of improving hurling in general and revamping the senior and minor championships. Their proposals involved allowing the defeated Munster and Leinster finalists to re-enter the All-Ireland championship. While the two provincial final winners would automatically qualify for the All-Ireland semi-finals the two defeated provincial teams would join Galway and the Ulster champions in two play-off games or "quarter-finals". The two winners from these two games would then qualify for the semi-finals where they would be drawn against the Leinster and Munster champions. Repeat games would be avoided in the All-Ireland semi-final stage.

At the start of 1996 these proposals looked unlikely of being introduced, however, a whistle-stop tour undertaken by the committee's secretary Frank Murphy and Pat Daly, the GAA's Games Development Officer, had changed the position. In April 1996 the committee's proposals were accepted at the GAA's annual congress. Most counties supported the new proposals and motion 15 (a) was passed with more than a two-thirds majority.

== Results ==
=== Leinster Minor Hurling Championship ===
First round

10 May 1997 First round	Wexford	3-09 - 5-11	Kilkenny	O'Kennedy Park, New Ross
	J Hughes 0-6, J Hendrick 1-2, D O'Connor 1-0, M Synnott 1-0, K Furlong 0-1.		H Shefflin 2-3, JP O'Neill 1-3, K Power 1-1, C Dunne 1-0, P Sheehan 0-2, P Buggy 0-1, N Hoyne 0-1.	Referee: P Aherne (Carlow)

Semi-finals

28 June 1997 Semi-final	Laois	1-10 - 1-12	Offaly	O'Moore Park, Portlaoise
	J Young 1-7, K Galvin 0-1, C Moore 0-1, E Dowling 0-1.		R McRedmond 1-3, C Gath 0-4, P Carroll 0-2, D Kelly 0-1, A Hayes 0-1, B Murphy 0-1.	Referee: J Guinan (Kilkenny)

2 July 1997 Semi-final	Kilkenny	0-11 - 2-05	Dublin	Nowlan Park, Kilkenny
	H Sheffin 0-3, P Sheehan 0-3, J Power 0-2, J Barron 0-1, C Dunne 0-1, P Buggy 0-1.		P Meehan 1-2, R Brennan 1-0, W McCarthy 0-1, D Donnelly 0-1, S Martin 0-1.

5 July 1997 Semi-final replay	Dublin	1-04 - 3-17	Kilkenny	Parnell Park, Dublin
	F Armstrong 1-0, P Meehan 0-3, C Daly 0-1.		H Shefflin 1-7, P Sheehan 1-2, J Barron 1-2, K Power 0-2, J Hickey 0-2, JP Corcoran 0-1, N Hickey 0-1.

Final

13 July 1997 Final	Kilkenny	3-16 - 0-10	Offaly	Croke Park, Dublin
	H Shefflin 2-4, K Power 1-5, M Hoyne 0-2, P Sheehan 0-2, J Barron 0-2, JP O'Neill 0-1.		R McRedmond 0-3, P Carroll 0-3, B Murphy 0-1, P Molloy 0-1, C Gath 0-1.	Referee: D Murphy (Wexford)

=== Munster Minor Hurling Championship ===
First round

23 April 1997 First round	Tipperary	3-09 - 1-12	Waterford	Páirc Mac Gearailt, Fermoy
	P Kelly 1-2, P O'Brien 0-4, G Coppinger 1-0, S Butler 1-0, T Fletcher 0-1, D Fahy 0-1, W Maher 0-1.		P Fitzgerald 1-4, S Prendergast 0-2, N Jacob 0-2, J Murray 0-2, B Wall 0-1, R Keane 0-1.	Referee: W Horgan (Cork)

Semi-final

7 May 1997 Semi-final	Limerick	0-13 - 1-15	Tipperary	Gaelic Grounds, Limerick
	K O'Dwyer 0-8, P O'Grady 0-2, D Stapleton 0-2, M Keane 0-1.		P O'Brien 0-6, T Fletcher 1-0, P Kelly 0-3, W Maher 0-3, G Coppinger 0-2, D Shelley 0-1.	Referee: A O'Sullivan (Clare)

8 May 1997 Semi-final	Cork	0-10 - 2-12	Clare	FitzGerald Park, Kilmallock
	C McCarthy 0-5, B O'Connor 0-4, B Murphy 0-1.		D Madden 1-2, Brian McMahon (wing-back) 1-2, Brian McMahon (forward) 0-2, M Lennon 0-2, S Fitzpatrick 0-1, Joe O'Meara 0-1, John O'Meara 0-1, C Earlie 0-1.	Referee: J Sexton (Limerick)

Final

6 July 1997 Final	Tipperary	2-13 - 1-13	Clare	Páirc Uí Chaoimh, Cork
	P O'Brien 0-7, D Shelley 2-0, J Keane 0-2, P Kelly 0-1, C Coppinger 0-1, A Fogarty 0-1, T Fletcher 0-1.		B McMahon (Kilmaley) 1-2, S Fitzpatrick 0-2, Joe O'Meara 0-2, D Madden 0-2, C Mullins 0-2, B McMahon (Newmarket) 0-1, J Considine 0-1, P Moroney 0-1.	Referee: G Harrington (Cork)

=== Ulster Minor Hurling Championship ===
Semi-final

22 June 1997 Semi-final	Down	2-11 - 1-11	Derry	Casement Park, Belfast
				Referee: G Devlin

Final

6 July 1997 Final	Antrim	3-14 - 1-10	Down	Casement Park, Belfast
	J Flynn 0-6, G Ward 1-1, B McNaughton 1-1, C Magee 1-1, P Close 0-3, E McNaughton 0-1, T McGilligan 0-1.		P Milligan 0-4, G Carson 1-0, M Donnelly 0-1, R Crawford 0-1, S Wilson 0-1, M Craig 0-1, C Braniff 0-1, B Murray 0-1.	Referee: G Devlin

=== All-Ireland Minor Hurling Championship ===
Quarter-finals

26 July 1997 Quarter-final	Antrim	1-04 - 0-13	Clare	St. Tiernach's Park, Clones
	T McGilligan 1-0, J Flynn 0-2, R McGreevey 0-1, P Close 0-1.		M Lennon 0-7, D Madden 0-2, J O'Meara 0-1, B McMahon 0-1, G Considine 0-1, C Earley 0-1.	Referee: P Aherne (Carlow)

27 July 1997 Quarter-final	Galway	3-12 - 0-10	Offaly	Semple Stadium, Thurles
	D Huban 2-1, K Daniels 1-1, G Keary 0-3, N Lalwor 0-2, G Hurney 0-2, K Hayes 0-2, D Tierney 0-1.		R McRedmond 0-4, P Carroll 0-3, E McGuinness 0-1, D Kelly 0-1, D Carney 0-1.	Referee: M Wadding (Waterford)

Semi-finals

10 August 1997 Semi-final	Kilkenny	1-7 - 0-13	Clare	Croke Park, Dublin
	K Power 1-0, H Shefflin 0-3, P Sheehan 0-3, J Barron 0-1.		M Lennon 0-6, G Considine 0-3, B McMahon 0-2, C Earlie 0-1, D Madden 0-1.	Referee: G Harrington (Cork)

17 August 1997 Semi-final	Tipperary	0-14 - 2-9	Galway	Croke Park, Dublin
	P O'Brien 0-7, D Fanning 0-2, P Kelly 0-1, S Butler 0-1, G O'Grady 0-1, D Shelly 0-1, D Fahy 0-1.		D Donoghue 1-0, O Deeley 1-0, S Morgan 0-3, K Hayes 0-2, C Coen 0-1, N Lawlor 0-1, K Daniels 0-1, G Keary 0-1.	Referee: T McIntyre (Antrim)

Final

14 September 1997 Final	Clare	1-11 - 1-09	Galway	Croke Park, Dublin
	M Lennon 0-5, B McMahon 1-0, B McMahon 0-2, G Considine 0-2, C Mullen 0-1, D Madden 0-1.		S Morgan 1-1, K Hayes 0-3, D Donoghue 0-2, C Coen 0-1, O Deeley 0-1, N Lawlor 0-1.	Referee: M Wadding (Waterford)

== Championship statistics ==
=== Top scorers ===
Top scorer overall

Rank	Player	Club	Tally	Total	Matches	Average
1	Henry Shefflin	Kilkenny	5-20	35	5	7.00
2	Paddy O'Brien	Tipperary	0-24	24	4	6.00
3	Mark Lennon	Clare	0-20	20	5	4.00

Top scorers in a single game

Rank	Player	Club	Tally	Total	Opposition
1	Henry Shefflin	Kilkenny	2-04	10	Offaly
1	James Young	Laois	1-07	10	Offaly
1	Henry Shefflin	Kilkenny	1-07	10	Dublin
2	Henry Shefflin	Kilkenny	2-03	9	Wexford
3	Kevin Power	Kilkenny	1-05	8	Offaly
3	Kevin O'Dwyer	Limerick	0-08	8	Tipperary
4	David Huban	Galway	2-01	7	Offaly
4	Pat Fitzgerald	Waterford	1-04	7	Tipperary
4	Paddy O'Brien	Tipperary	0-07	7	Clare
4	Mark Lennon	Clare	0-07	7	Antrim
4	Paddy O'Brien	Tipperary	0-07	7	Galway
