= 2013 All-Ireland Under-21 Hurling Championship final =

2013 All-Ireland Under-21 Hurling Championship Final
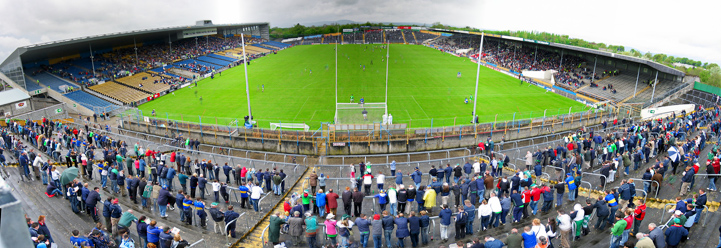
- Event: 2013 All-Ireland Under-21 Hurling Championship
Clare	Antrim
2-28	0-12
- Date: 14 September 2013
- Venue: Semple Stadium, Thurles
- Man of the Match: Davy O'Halloran
- Referee: Colm Lyons (Cork)
- Attendance: 11,148

The 2013 All-Ireland Under-21 Hurling Championship final was a hurling match that was played at Semple Stadium, Thurles on 14 September 2013 to determine the winners of the 2013 All-Ireland Under-21 Hurling Championship, the 50th season of the All-Ireland Under-21 Hurling Championship, a tournament organised by the Gaelic Athletic Association for the champion teams of the four provinces of Ireland. The final was contested by Clare of Munster and Antrim of Ulster, with Clare winning by 2–28 to 0–12.

The All-Ireland final between Clare and Antrim was their second ever championship meeting and their first in an All-Ireland final. Clare were appearing in their third final in five years, while Antrim were lining out in their first ever All-Ireland decider.

Clare went two points ahead after five minutes, with Cathal O'Connell scoring two early frees. Conor McCann opened Antrim's account after seven minutes, and although the score line stood at 0–4 to 0-2 after 11 1/2 minutes, Antrim failed to score again for a further 13 minutes. Antrim's use of the short puck-out strategy was not proving a success with the Saffrons particularly caught in the 20th minute, as Davy O'Halloran controlled possession from Ger Dixon's puck-out and fired the reigning champions to a 0–13 to 0–2 lead. O'Halloran fired Clare's opening goal in the 23rd minute. Further points were added before Shane O'Donnell's 27th-minute goal gave Clare a 2–16 to 0–3 lead. Antrim added another point before the short whistle to reduce the deficit to 18 points.

Antrim were sluggish after the restart with Kelly and O'Halloran scoring points for Clare inside the opening minute. Ciaran Clarke forced Clare goalkeeper Ronan Taaffe into a great save in the 35th minute, however, scores from O'Connell and O'Halloran handed Clare a 22-point lead in the 37th minute. Clarke, Chris McGuinness and Niall McKenna pegged back points for the Saffrons, while at the opposite end it could have been worse for the Ulster side but for the brilliance of Dixon who pulled off fine saves in the 46th and 56th minutes. Antrim worked hard late on with Clarke and substitute Michael Bradley taking scores, but it was too little too late as Clare powered to a 22-point win.

Clare's All-Ireland victory was their second in-in-row.

== Match ==
=== Details ===
14 September 2013

Clare	2-28 - 0-12	Antrim
C O'Connell (0-11, 10f), D O'Halloran (1-04), S O'Donnell (1-00), C Galvin (0-03), T Kelly (0-03), C Malone (0-02), S Morey (0-02), A O'Neill (0-01, 1f), J Colleran (0-01), E Boyce (0-01).		C Clarke (0-06, 4f, 1sl), C McGuinness (0-01), J McGreevey (0-01), S McAfee (0-01), N McKenna (0-01, 1f), C McCann (0-01), M Bradley (0-01).

Semple Stadium, Thurles
Attendance: 11,148
Referee: C Lyons (Cork)

Clare	Antrim
