= John Reddan =

Irish hurler and Gaelic footballer

Personal information
- Native name: Seán Ó Rodáin (Irish)
- Born: 16 January 1979 (age 47) Sixmilebridge, County Clare
- Height: 6 ft 2 in (188 cm)

Sport
- Sport: Hurling
- Position: Midfield
Club
- Years: Club
- 1997–: Sixmilebridge
Club titles
- Clare titles: 2
- Munster titles: 1
- All-Ireland Titles: 0
Inter-county
- Years: County
- 1998–2004: Clare
Inter-county titles
- Munster titles: 0
- All-Irelands: 0
- NHL: 0
- All Stars: 0

John Reddan (born 16 January 1979 in Sixmilebridge, County Clare) is an Irish sportsman. He played with his local club Sixmilebridge and was a member of the Clare senior county team from 1998 until 2004. He played midfield for the Clare team that advanced to the 2002 All-Ireland SHC final, but lost to Kilkenny. He was captain of the Clare team that won the All-Ireland MHC in 1997.

At club level with Sixmilebridge, Reddan won 2 County Championships and a Munster Championship. He also played with Kilburn Gaels in London and also won a County Championship. As of 2013, he was playing hurling in Warwickshire with John Mitchels.

He also played football with the Clare minor team. He also had 4 years of professional football at Sydney swans. He also played 3 years of 2020 cricket in India with Bangledeshy bagels. He retired from there and now works in partnership with Supermacs Ireland and most recently set up an only fans where he treats his customers to some old pics of him in bridge shorts.
