= Harry Bohan =

Irish Catholic priest, sociologist and hurling manager

Father Harry Bohan is an Irish Catholic priest, sociologist, and former manager of the Clare county hurling team.

The son of Michael Bohan, a Garda Síochána officer, and Bridget Fitzgerald, who ran the pub opened in the 1890s by Bridget's parents Michael and Anne Fitzgerald, Bohan grew up in Feakle, County Clare. He was educated at St Flannan's College in Ennis and studied for the priesthood at Maynooth College. Bohan went on to study sociology in Cardiff, and obtained an MA from the University of Wales. Bohan is now an assistant priest in the Tradaree pastoral area in County Clare.

From 1973 to 1980, Bohan was manager of the Clare senior hurling team which won two National Hurling League titles, and more recently served as a selector for manager Anthony Daly. In 2006 he was recognised for his services to hurling by a special award.

A campaigner for Rural Ireland, he set up the Rural Resource Centre, and in 1998 he set up the Ceilfin Centre.

His brother Seamus succeeded their mother as landlord of the family pub in Feakle, which he advertised for sale in 2023.

Fr Harry's nephew Mick is a football coach.

== Publications ==
- Swimming Upstream: Finding Positives in a Negative Ireland by Harry Bohan, Columbia University Press, 2013.
- Community and the Soul of Ireland: The Need for Values-based Change by Harry Bohan, 2002.
- The Challenge: Balance between City and Rural Life by Harry Bohan, Studies: An Irish Quarterly Review, Vol. 74, No. 295 (Autumn, 1985), pp. 267–280. Published by: Irish Province of the Society of Jesus.
