= David McInerney =

Irish hurler

Personal information
- Native name: Daithí Mac an Oirchinnigh (Irish)
- Born: 7 December 1992 (age 33) Ennis, Ireland
- Occupation: Teacher
- Height: 1.83 m (6 ft 0 in)

Sport
- Sport: Hurling
- Position: Full Back
Club
- Years: Club
- 2010-: Tulla
Inter-county*
| Years | County | Apps (scores) |
| 2013- | Clare | 8 (0-1) |
Inter-county titles
- Munster titles: 0
- All-Irelands: 2
- NHL: 0
- All Stars: 2
- *Inter County team apps and scores correct as of 25 August 2013.

David McInerney (born 7 December 1992) is an Irish hurler who plays as a full-back for the Clare senior team. At club level McInerney plays with Tulla. He helped Tulla win the Senior B title in 2010 with victory over Inagh-Kilnamona. McInerney made his Senior Championship debut on 2 June 2013 against Waterford, starting at full-back in a 2–20 to 1–15 victory. McInerney scored his first point for the Clare seniors in the victory over Laois in the 2013 All Ireland qualifiers.

== Career ==
McInerney is the son of the former Clare hurler Jim McInerney who was part of the winning Clare panel in 1995.

In October 2013, McInerney was named the Bord Gais U-21 hurling Player of the Year for 2013. He won an All Star that year.

On 21 July 2024, he started in the half-back line as Clare won the All-Ireland for the first time in 11 years after an extra-time win against Cork by 3–29 to 1-34, claiming their fifth All-Ireland title. McInerney won his second All Star at the end of the 2024 season.

== Honours ==
- All-Ireland Senior Hurling Championship (2): 2013, 2024
- Munster Under-21 Hurling Championship (2) 2012, 2013
- All-Ireland Under-21 Hurling Championship (2) 2012, 2013
- Munster Minor Hurling Championship (1) : 2011
- Fitzgibbon Cup (1): 2015 (c)

=== Individual ===
- GAA-GPA All-Star Award (2): 2013, 2024
- Bord Gáis Energy U-21 Player of the Year (1) : 2013
- Bord Gáis Energy U-21 All-Star (1) : 2013
- The Sunday Game Team of the Year: 2024
