= Colm Galvin =

Irish hurler

Personal information
- Native name: Colm Ó hEáráin (Irish)
- Born: 2 February 1993 (age 33) Ennis, County Clare, Ireland
- Occupation: Student
- Height: 1.75 m (5 ft 9 in)

Sport
- Sport: Hurling
- Position: Midfield
Club
- Years: Club
- 2010-: Clonlara
College
- Years: College
- Mary Immaculate College
College titles
- Fitzgibbon titles: 2
Inter-county
Years	County	Apps (scores)
2012-2022	Clare	10 (0-35)
Inter-county titles
- All-Irelands: 1
- All Stars: 1

Colm Galvin (born 2 February 1993) is an Irish hurler who previously played as a midfielder for the Clare senior team.

Galvin joined the team during the 2012 championship and immediately became a regular member of the starting fifteen. A Munster medalist in the minor grade and a Munster and All-Ireland medalist in the under-21 grade. At club level Galvin plays with Clonlara.

Galvin missed the start of the 2015 All-Ireland Senior Hurling Championship as he was spending the summer in Boston. He returned from Boston at the end of June and rejoined the Clare hurling panel.

Galvin attended NUI Galway.

In February 2022, Galvin announced his retirement from inter-county hurling.

== Honours ==
Clare

- All-Ireland Senior Hurling Championship (1): 2013
- All-Ireland Under-21 Hurling Championship (3): 2012, 2013, 2014
- Munster Under-21 Hurling Championship (3): 2012, 2013, 2014,
- Munster Minor Hurling Championship (2) 2010 2011

== Individual ==
Awards

- GAA-GPA All-Star Award (1): 2013
- Bord Gáis Under-21 All-Star (2) : 2013, 2014

Awards
Preceded by David McInerney	All-Ireland Under-21 Hurling Championship; Player of the Year; 2014	Succeeded by Richie English
