= Cathal O'Connell =

Irish hurler

Personal information
- Nickname: Tots

Sport
- Sport: Hurling
- Position: Forward
Club
- Years: Club
- Clonlara
Inter-county
- Years: County
- 2013-: Clare
Inter-county titles
- All-Irelands: 1

Cathal O'Connell is an Irish hurler who plays as a forward for the Clare senior team. At club level he plays with Clonlara.

O'Connell won the All-Ireland Under-21 Hurling Championship in 2012, 2013 and 2014 with Clare, and was a member of the panel that won the 2013 All-Ireland Senior Hurling Championship.

== Honours ==
- All-Ireland Senior Hurling Championship (1): 2013
- Munster Under-21 Hurling Championship (2) : 2012, 2013, 2014
- All-Ireland Under-21 Hurling Championship (2) : 2012, 2013, 2014
- Munster Minor Hurling Championship (2) : 2010, 2011
