= Séadna Morey =

Irish hurler

Personal information
- Native name: Séadna Ó Móra (Irish)
- Born: 9 March 1991 (age 35) Sixmilebridge, County Clare, Ireland
- Occupation: Student
- Height: 5 ft 10 in (178 cm)

Sport
- Sport: Hurling
- Position: Left corner-back
Club
- Years: Club
- 2010-present: Sixmilebridge
Club titles
- Clare titles: 4
Inter-county*
Years	County	Apps (scores)
2012-present	Clare	9 (0-2)
Inter-county titles
- Munster titles: 0
- All-Irelands: 2
- NHL: 0
- All Stars: 0
- *Inter County team apps and scores correct as of 00:55, 9 August 2013.

Séadna Morey (born 9 March 1991) is an Irish hurler who plays as a left corner-back for the Clare senior team.

== Career ==
Born in Sixmilebridge, County Clare, Morey first played competitive hurling whilst at school in St. Flannan's College. He arrived on the inter-county scene at the age of seventeen when he first linked up with the Clare minor team, before later lining out with the under-21 side. He made his senior debut in the 2012 championship and immediately became a regular member of the starting fifteen. A two-time Munster medalist in the minor grade and a three-time All-Ireland medalist in the under-21 grade, in 2013 he won a first All Ireland senior title.

At club level Morey plays with Sixmilebridge.

Morey attended NUI Galway and UL.

Morey withdrew from the Clare hurling squad ahead of the 2021 season.

== Honours ==
Clare

- All-Ireland Senior Hurling Championship (1) : 2013, 2024
- All-Ireland Under-21 Hurling Championship (3) : 2012, 2013, 2014
- Munster Under-21 Hurling Championship (2) : 2012, 2013, 2014
- Munster Minor Hurling Championship (2) : 2010, 2011

Sixmilebridge

- Clare Senior Hurling Championship (4) : 2013 2015 2017 2019
- Clare Under-21 Hurling Championship (1) : 2013
