= 2012 All-Ireland Under-21 Hurling Championship =

All-Ireland Under-21 Hurling Championship 2012
Championship Details
- Dates: 6 June - 15 September 2012
- Teams: 17

All Ireland Champions
- Winners: Clare (2nd win)
- Captain: Conor McGrath
- Manager: Gerry O'Connor & Donal Moloney

All Ireland Runners-up
- Runners-up: Kilkenny
- Captain: Cillian Buckley
- Manager: Richie Mulrooney

Provincial Champions
- Munster: Clare
- Leinster: Kilkenny
- Ulster: Antrim
- Connacht: Not Played

Championship Statistics
- Matches Played: 16
- Total Goals: 48 (3.00 per game)
- Total Points: 476 (29.75 per game)
- Top Scorer: Cathal O'Connell (1-26)

The 2012 All-Ireland Under-21 Hurling Championship was the 48th staging of the All-Ireland championship since its establishment in 1964. The draw for the 2012 fixtures took place in late 2011. The championship began on 6 June 2012 and ended on 15 September 2012. Galway were the defending champions.

Clare won the All-Ireland final after defeating Kilkenny by 2–17 to 2–11.

== Results ==
=== Leinster Under-21 Hurling Championship ===
June 6
Quarter-final

Offaly	0-10 - 1-19	Wexford
A Hynes (0-3, frees), S Quirke (0-3), T Carrol (0-2), T Spain (0-1), A Kelly (0-1).	Report	G Moore (0-8, 3f), J Guiney (0-4, 4f), A Nolan (1-0), B Carton (0-3), L Chin (0-2), M O’Regan (0-1), J Hobbs (0-1).

O'Connor Park, Tullamore
Referee: S Cleere (Kilkenny)

June 6
Quarter-final

Laois	2-15 - 0-17	Dublin
S Maher 0-8 (2f, 3 65s), N Foyle 1-1, W Dunphy 0-3, B Reddin 1-0, R King, D King, D Freeman 0-1 each.	Report	S McGrath 0-7 (6f), S O’Connor, J Hetherton, E Dillon 0-2 each, D Sutcliffe, G Whelan, M Schutte, T Connelly 0-1 each.

O'Moore Park, Portlaoise
Referee: D Hughes (Carlow)

June 20
Semi-final

Carlow	0-14 - 0-15	Laois
M Kavanagh 0-5 (0-3f), A Kenny, C Wall 0-2 each, D English (65), R Smithers, J M Nolan, D Roberts, P Shaw 0-1 each.	Report	S Maher 0-8 (0-7f), B Reddin 0-2, D Freeman, W Dunphy, P Lalor, N Foyle, J Ryan 0-1 each.

Dr. Cullen Park, Carlow
Referee: J Keenan (Wicklow)

June 20
Semi-final

Kilkenny	3-20 - 4-6	Wexford
K Kelly 0-9, (7f); W Walsh 2-1; J Power 1-1; G Aylward, M Gaffney 0-3 each; G Brennan, C Kenny, P Walsh 0-1 each.	Report	J Guiney 2-1 (2-1f); M O’Regan 1-2; B Carton 1-1; I Byrne, G Moore 0-1 each.

Nowlan Park, Kilkenny
Referee: D Hughes (Carlow)

July 11
Final

Laois	1-13 - 4-24	Kilkenny
S Maher 0-7 (5f), D King 0-4, N Foyle 1-1, W Dunphy 0-1.	Report	G Aylward 2-5, J Power 2-1, K Kelly (5f); P Walsh 0-6 each; C Buckley, W Walsh 0-2 each; G Brennan, M Gaffney 0-1 each.

O'Moore Park, Portlaoise
Referee: G McGrath (Dublin)

Quarter-final
Wexford	1-19
Offaly	0-10
Laois	2-14
Dublin	0-17

Semi-finals
Wexford	4-6
Kilkenny	3-20
Laois	0-15
Carlow	0-14

Leinster final
Kilkenny	4-24
Laois	1-13

=== Munster Under-21 Hurling Championship ===
June 6
Quarter-final

Cork	0-17 - 0-18	Tipperary
J Coughlan 0-9 (0-6f), C Lehane, D Drake 0-3 each, C Joyce (0-1 ’65), E O’Sullivan 0-1 each.	Report	J O’Dwyer 0-9 (0-6f), S Curran, D Collins 0-2 each, B Stapleton, D McCormack, N O’Meara, E Murray, L McGrath 0-1 each.

Páirc Uí Chaoimh, Cork
Referee: P Casey (Waterford)

July 18
Semi-final

Limerick	1-11 - 1-16	Tipperary
S Dowling 1-8 (0-6f, 0-2 65s); K Downes 0-2; N Kennedy 0-1.	Report	J O’Dwyer 0-9 (8f); D Maher 1-3; C Hogan, L McGrath, J Forde, S Curran, 0-1 each.

Gaelic Grounds, Limerick
Referee: M Wadding (Waterford)

July 19
Semi-final

Clare	2-22- 0-9	Waterford
C O’Connell 0-10 (4f, 2 65s); D O’Halloran 1-4; P Collin 1-0; A Cunningham 0-2; C McGrath 0-2; C Galvin, S Golden, P Duggan, T Kelly, 0-1 each.	Report	M O’Neill 0-5 (4f); E Murphy 0-2; Pauric Mahony, B O’Halloran, 0-1 each.

Cusack Park, Ennis
Referee: J Ryan (Tipperary)

August 8
Final

Clare	1-16 - 1-14	Tipperary
T Kelly 0-7 (2f, 1 65); N Arthur 1-0; C O’Connell 0-3 (1f); C McGrath 0-3 (3f); P Collins 0-2; S Morey 0-1.	Report	J O’Dwyer 1-7 (3f); C Hogan 0-2; J Forde, D Maher, L McGrath, E Murray, A McCormack, 0-1 each.

Cusack Park, Ennis
Attendance: 8,379
Referee: J Sexton (Cork)

Quarter-final
Cork	0-17
Tipperary	0-18

Semi-finals
Waterford	0-9
Clare	2-22
Tipperary	1-16
Limerick	1-11

Munster final
Clare	1-16
Tipperary	1-14

=== Ulster Under-21 Hurling Championship ===
July 11
Quarter-final

Armagh	4-15 - 0-11	Fermanagh
C Corvan (0-6, 0-5 frees), S Colton (1-1), D Magee (1-1), T Duffy (1-0), S Gaffney (1-0), Michael Lennon (0-2), M Toal (0-2), C McKee (0-1), A Mackle (0-1).	Report	S Curran (0-4 frees), JP McGarry (0-3), C Corrigan (0-1), F McBrien (0-1 free), O Boyle (0-1).

St. Tiernach's Park, Clones
Referee: B Sweeney (Cavan)

July 18
Semi-final

Down	2-10 - 3-15	Derry
L McMullan 2-2, C Dorrian 0-4, E Conway, D McManus, J Gilmore, A Smyth 0-1 each.	Report	S Farren 2-7, N Ferris 1-0, A Grant 0-2, C OKane 0-3, T McCloskey, C Convery, C Gilmore 0-1 each.

Casement Park, Belfast

July 18
Semi-final

Antrim	1-18 - 0-11	Armagh
C McCann (1-5, four frees), S Smith (0-3), S McAfee (0-2), M Devlin (0-2), M Donnelly (0-1), J McCouaig (0-1); A McKeown (0-1), K McKernan (0-1), J Black (0-1); N Elliott (0-1.	Report	C Corvan (0-5, frees), C McKee (0-3, 65s), D Nugent (0-1), E Carville (0-1), D Magee (0-1).

Páirc Esler, Newry

July 25
Final

Antrim	2-20 - 1-12	Derry
C McCann (1-4, 0-1 free), S Smith (1-2), M Devlin (0-4), S McAfee (0-3), J Black (0-3, 0-1 free), K McKiernan (0-2), A McKeown (0-1), C Laverty (0-1).	Report	S Farren (1-4, 0-3 frees), A Grant (0-3), T McCloskey (0-2), N Ferris (0-2), C Gilmore (0-1).

Athletic Grounds, Armagh
Referee: D Magee (Down)

Quarter-final
Fermanagh	0-11
Armagh	4-15

Semi-finals
Down	2-10
Derry	3-15
Antrim	1-18
Armagh	0-11

Ulster final
Derry	1-12
Antrim	2-20

=== All-Ireland Under-21 Hurling Championship ===
August
Semi-final

Clare	4-23 - 0-7	Antrim
C O'Connell (0-7), C McGrath (2-0), N Arthur (1-2), T Kelly (0-4), C McInerney (1-0), S Morey (0-2), P Collins (0-2), A Cunningham (0-2), S Golden (0-1), P Duggan (0-1), P O'Connor (0-1), C Malone (0-1), D O'Halloran (0-1).	Report	K McKiernan (0-2), M Devlin (0-2), J Black (0-1), Laverty (0-1), D McKinley (0-1).

Semple Stadium, Thurles
Referee: A Stapleton (Laois)

August
Semi-final

Kilkenny	4-15 - 2-15	Galway
J Power 2-1 (1-0 pen), K Kelly 0-6 (0-4f), G Aylward 1-3, O Walsh 1-0, P Walsh, C Buckley, W Walsh 0-2 each.	Report	N Burke 0-8 (0-5f); D Glennon 1-1, J Cooney 1-0, T Haran 0-3 (0-2f), J Glynn 0-2, R Commins 0-1.

Semple Stadium, Thurles
Referee: J Sexton (Cork)

September 15
Final

Clare	2-17 - 2-11	Kilkenny
C O’Connell 1-6 (0-4f), C McGrath 1-0, C McInerney 0-3 (0-1f), T Kelly 0-2 (0-1f), S Morey 0-1, C Galvin 0-1, P O’Connor 0-1, P Collins 0-1, S Golden 0-1.	Report	K Kelly 0-6 (0-4f), G Aylward 1-1, J Power 1-0 (1-0 pen), W Walsh 0-2, P Walsh 0-1, G Brennan 0-1.

Semple Stadium, Thurles
Referee: D Kirwan (Cork)

== Championship statistics ==
=== Miscellaneous ===
- Laois qualify for the Leinster final for the first time since the 1990 championship.
- Clare win their second ever Munster title.
- The All-Ireland semi-final meeting between Antrim and Clare is the teams' first meeting in the history of the championship.

== Top scorers ==
=== Season ===
Rank	Player	County	Tally	Total	Matches	Average
1	Cathal O'Connell	Clare	1-26	29	4	7.25
2	John O'Dwyer	Tipperary	1-25	28	3	9.33
3	Kevin Kelly	Kilkenny	0-27	27	4	6.75
4	Ger Aylward	Kilkenny	4-12	24	4	6.00
5	Stephen Maher	Laois	0-23	23	3	7.66
6	John Power	Kilkenny	6-03	21	4	5.25
7	Shane Farren	Derry	3-11	20	2	10.00
8	Conor McCann	Antrim	2-09	15	2	7.50
9	Conor McGrath	Clare	3-05	14	4	3.50
10	Walter Walsh	Kilkenny	2-07	13	4	3.25

=== Single game ===
Rank	Player	County	Tally	Total	Opposition
1	Shane Farren	Derry	2-07	13	Down
2	Ger Aylward	Kilkenny	2-05	11	Laois
2	Shane Dowling	Limerick	1-08	11	Tipperary
4	Cathal O'Connell	Clare	0-10	10	Waterford
5	Cathal O'Connell	Clare	1-06	9	Kilkenny
5	Jamie Coughlan	Cork	0-09	9	Tipperary
5	John O'Dwyer	Tipperary	0-09	9	Limerick
5	John O'Dwyer	Tipperary	0-09	9	Cork
5	Kevin Kelly	Kilkenny	0-09	9	Wexford
10	Lorcan McMullan	Down	2-02	8	Derry
10	Conor McCann	Antrim	1-05	8	Armagh
10	Gary Moore	Wexford	0-08	8	Offaly
10	Stephen Maher	Laois	0-08	8	Dublin
10	Stephen Maher	Laois	0-08	8	Carlow
10	Niall Burke	Galway	0-08	8	Kilkenny
