= 2019 All-Ireland Senior Hurling Championship =

Championship details
- Dates: 11 May – 18 August 2019
- Teams: 12

All-Ireland champions
- Winning team: Tipperary (28th win)
- Captain: Séamus Callanan
- Manager: Liam Sheedy

All-Ireland Finalists
- Losing team: Kilkenny
- Captain: T. J. Reid
- Manager: Brian Cody

Provincial champions
- Munster: Limerick
- Leinster: Wexford
- Ulster: Not Played
- Connacht: Not Played

Championship statistics
- No. matches played: 14
- Goals total: 34 (2.42 per game)
- Points total: 583 (41.64 per game)
- Top Scorer: T. J. Reid (5–83)
- Player of the Year: Séamus Callanan
- All-Star Team: See here

The 2019 All-Ireland Senior Hurling Championship (SHC) was the 132nd staging of the All-Ireland Senior Hurling Championship, the Gaelic Athletic Association's premier inter-county hurling tournament, since its establishment in 1887. The draw for the 2019 fixtures took place on 11 October 2018. The championship began on 11 May 2019 and concluded on 18 August 2019.

The defending champion was Limerick.

Carlow returned to the Leinster SHC for the first time since 2016, replacing Offaly who were relegated in 2018. Carlow lost all their four games in 2019 and were automatically relegated to the 2020 Joe McDonagh Cup.

Tipperary won the competition, defeating Kilkenny in the final.

== Format ==
=== Leinster Championship ===
Participating counties (5): Carlow, Dublin, Galway, Kilkenny, Wexford

Group stage (10 matches): Each team plays each other once. The 1st and 2nd placed teams advance to the Leinster final and the 3rd placed team advances to the all-Ireland preliminary quarter-finals. All other teams are eliminated from the championship and the bottom placed team may face relegation to next years Joe McDonagh Cup.

Final (1 match): The top 2 teams in the group stage contest this game. The Leinster champions advance to the All-Ireland semi-finals and the Leinster runners-up advance to the All-Ireland quarter-finals.

=== Munster Championship ===
Participating counties (5): Clare, Cork, Limerick, Tipperary, Waterford

Group stage (10 matches): Each team plays each other once. The 1st and 2nd placed teams advance to the Munster final and the 3rd placed team advances to the all-Ireland preliminary quarter-finals. All other teams are eliminated from the championship and the bottom placed team may face relegation to next years Joe McDonagh Cup.

Final (1 match): The top 2 teams in the group stage contest this game. The Munster champions advance to the All-Ireland semi-finals and the Munster runners-up advance to the All-Ireland quarter-finals.

=== Joe McDonagh Cup ===
Participating counties (5): Antrim, Kerry, Laois, Offaly, Westmeath

Group stage (10 matches): Each team plays each other once. The 1st and 2nd placed teams advance to the Joe McDonagh Cup final. All other teams are eliminated from the championship and the bottom placed team are relegated to next years Christy Ring Cup.

Final (1 match): The top 2 teams in the group stage contest this game. The Joe McDonagh Cup champions and runners-up advance to the All-Ireland preliminary quarter-finals.

=== All-Ireland Championship ===
Preliminary quarter-finals (2 matches): The 3rd placed teams from the Leinster and Munster championships play the Joe McDonagh Cup champions and runners-up. Two teams are eliminated at this stage while the winners advance to the quarter-finals.

Quarter-finals (2 matches): The winners of the preliminary quarter-finals join the Leinster and Munster runners-up to make up the quarter-final pairings. Teams who may have already met in the provincial championships are kept apart in separate quarter-finals. Two teams are eliminated at this stage while the winners advance to the semi-finals.

Semi-finals (2 matches): The winners of the quarter-finals join the Leinster and Munster champions to make up the semi-final pairings. Teams who may have already met in the provincial championships are kept apart in separate semi-finals where possible. Two teams are eliminated at this stage while the winners advance to the final.

Final (1 match): The two winners of the semi-finals contest this game.

== Team changes ==
=== From Championship ===
Relegated to the Christy Ring Cup

- Meath

== Teams ==
=== General information ===
Fifteen counties will compete in the All-Ireland Senior Hurling Championship: five teams in the Leinster Senior Hurling Championship, five teams in the Munster Senior Hurling Championship and five teams in the Joe McDonagh Cup.

County	Last provincial title	Last championship title	Position in 2018 championship	Current championship
Antrim	2017	—	5th (Joe McDonagh Cup)	Joe McDonagh Cup
Carlow	—	—	Preliminary quarter-finals	Leinster Senior Hurling Championship
Clare	1998	2013	Semi-finals	Munster Senior Hurling Championship
Cork	2018	2005	Semi-finals	Munster Senior Hurling Championship
Dublin	2013	1938	4th (Leinster Senior Hurling Championship)	Leinster Senior Hurling Championship
Galway	2018	2017	Runners-up	Leinster Senior Hurling Championship
Kerry	1891	1891	3rd (Joe McDonagh Cup)	Joe McDonagh Cup
Kilkenny	2016	2015	Quarter-finals	Leinster Senior Hurling Championship
Laois	1949	1915	4th (Joe McDonagh Cup)	Joe McDonagh Cup
Limerick	2013	2018	Champions	Munster Senior Hurling Championship
Offaly	1995	1998	5th (Leinster Senior Hurling Championship)	Joe McDonagh Cup
Tipperary	2016	2016	4th (Munster Senior Hurling Championship)	Munster Senior Hurling Championship
Waterford	2010	1959	5th (Munster Senior Hurling Championship)	Munster Senior Hurling Championship
Westmeath	—	—	Preliminary quarter-finals	Joe McDonagh Cup
Wexford	2004	1996	Quarter-finals	Leinster Senior Hurling Championship

=== Personnel and kits ===
County	Manager	Captain(s)	Sponsor
Carlow	Colm Bonnar	Diarmuid Byrne; Richard Coady	IT Carlow
Clare	Donal Moloney; Gerry O'Connor	Patrick O'Connor	Pat O'Donnell
Cork	John Meyler	Séamus Harnedy	Chill Insurance
Dublin	Mattie Kenny	Seán Moran	AIG
Galway	Micheál Donoghue	David Burke	Supermac's
Kilkenny	Brian Cody	T. J. Reid	Glanbia
Laois	Eddie Brennan	Patrick Purcell	MW Hire Group
Limerick	John Kiely	Declan Hannon	J. P. McManus
Tipperary	Liam Sheedy	Séamus Callanan	Teneo
Waterford	Páraic Fanning	Noel Connors	TQS Integration
Westmeath	Joe Quaid	Aonghus Clarke	Renault
Wexford	Davy Fitzgerald	Lee Chin; Matthew O'Hanlon	Gain

== Summary ==
=== Championships ===
Level on Pyramid	Competition	Champions	Runners up
Tier 1	2019 All-Ireland Senior Hurling Championship	Tipperary	Kilkenny
Tier 1 (Leinster)	2019 Leinster Senior Hurling Championship	Wexford	Kilkenny
Tier 1 (Munster)	2019 Munster Senior Hurling Championship	Limerick	Tipperary
Tier 2	2019 Joe McDonagh Cup	Laois	Westmeath
Tier 3	2019 Christy Ring Cup	Meath	Down
Tier 4	2019 Nicky Rackard Cup	Sligo	Armagh
Tier 5	2019 Lory Meagher Cup	Leitrim	Lancashire

== Provincial championships ==
=== Leinster Senior Hurling Championship ===
Pos	Team	Pld	W	D	L	SF	SA	Diff	Pts	Qualification
1	Kilkenny	4	2	1	1	8–85	5–76	18	5	Advance to Leinster SHC final
2	Wexford	4	1	3	0	4–84	2–75	15	5	Advance to Leinster SHC final
3	Dublin	4	2	1	1	7–84	5–79	11	5	Advance to All-Ireland preliminary quarter-finals
4	Galway	4	2	1	1	4–84	6–75	3	5	
5	Carlow	4	0	0	4	3–64	8–96	−47	0	Relegated to Joe McDonagh Cup

Carlow are relegated to the Joe McDonagh Cup for 2020, because the winners of the 2019 Joe McDonagh Cup were from Leinster (Laois).

30 June 2019
Leinster Final

Report

Wexford	1–23 (26) – (23) 0–23	Kilkenny
(HT: 0–14 – 0–15)
Gls: M Fanning 1. Pts: L Chin 9 (7f, 1 65), C McDonald 4, R O'Connor 4, D O'Keeffe 2, S Donohoe 1, P Morris 1, L Og McGovern 1, M Fanning 1, J O'Connor 1.		Pts: TJ Reid 12 (7f, 1 65), A Mullen 3, W Walsh 2, C Fennelly 2, A Murphy 1, J Maher 1, E Murphy 1, G Aylward 1.

Croke Park, Dublin
Referee: J Keenan (Wicklow)
Attendance: 51,482

=== Munster Senior Hurling Championship ===
Pos	Team	Pld	W	D	L	SF	SA	Diff	Pts	Qualification
1	Tipperary	4	4	0	0	8–101	1–80	42	8	Advance to Munster SHC final
2	Limerick	4	2	0	2	4–92	2–71	27	4	Advance to Munster SHC final
3	Cork	4	2	0	2	6–98	7–87	8	4	Advance to All-Ireland preliminary quarter-finals
4	Clare	4	2	0	2	3–73	6–89	−25	4	
5	Waterford	4	0	0	4	2–67	7–104	−52	0	

Waterford did not need to play a relegation-playoff to avoid relegation to the Joe McDonagh Cup for 2020, because the winners of the 2019 Joe McDonagh Cup were from Leinster (Laois).

RTÉ

30 June 2019
14:00
Munster Final

Report

Limerick	2–26 (32) – (20) 2–14	Tipperary
(HT: 1–11 – 1-09)
Gls: P Casey 1, K Hayes 1. Pts: P Casey 5, T Morrissey 4, A Gillane (3f) 4, G Hegarty 3, D Byrnes (3f) 3, K Hayes 2, G Mulcahy 2, B Nash 1.		Gls: S Callanan 1, J McGrath 1. Pts: J Forde 6 (3f), R Maher 2, N McGrath (1f) 1, S Callanan 1, D McCormack 1, J O’Dwyer 1, J Morris 1, J Cahill 1.

LIT Gaelic Grounds, Limerick
Referee: P O'Dwyer (Carlow)
Attendance: 44,052

== Joe McDonagh Cup ==
=== Group Stage ===
Pos	Team	Pld	W	D	L	SF	SA	Diff	Pts	Qualification
1	Laois	4	3	1	0	12–85	6–83	+20	7	Advance to Final and All-Ireland preliminary quarter-finals
2	Westmeath	4	2	1	1	6–85	2–78	+19	5	Advance to Final and All-Ireland preliminary quarter-finals
3	Antrim	4	2	0	2	7–82	6–85	0	4	
4	Kerry	4	2	0	2	3–74	11–68	−18	4	
5	Offaly	4	0	0	4	8–69	11–81	−21	0	Relegated to Christy Ring Cup

=== Final ===
30 June 2019
13:45
Joe McDonagh Cup Final

report

Laois	3–26 (35) – (24) 1–21	Westmeath
(HT: 2–11 – 1–10)
Gls: R King 1, A Dunphy 1, S Bergin 1. Pts: M Kavanagh (6f) 12, A Dunphy 4, E Lyons 3, J Lennon 2, C Dwyer 2, N Foyle 2, P Purcell 1.		Gls: K Doyle 1. Pts: K Doyle (6f) 11, C Doyle 2, S Clavin 1, A Clarke 1, C Boyle 1, A Devine 1, D McNicholas 1, L Varley 1, J Boyle 1, E Price 1.

Croke Park, Dublin
Referee: C Cunning (Antrim)

Laois are promoted to the 2020 Leinster Senior Hurling Championship.

== Bracket ==
Preliminary Quarter-Finals
7 July 2019

Quarter-Finals
14 July 2019

Semi-Finals
27/28 July 2019

All-Ireland Final
18 August 2019

Limerick
2–17

Kilkenny
1–21

Kilkenny
2–27

Westmeath
0–20

Cork
3–18

Cork
1–40

Kilkenny
0–20

Tipperary

3–25

Wexford
3–20

Tipperary
1–28

Tipperary
2–25

Laois
1–22

Laois
1–18

Dublin
0–23

=== Preliminary quarter-finals ===
The third-placed teams in the Leinster and Munster championships played the two teams who competed in the Joe McDonagh Cup final, with the two Joe McDonagh finalists having home advantage. The Joe McDonagh champions, Laois, faced the third-placed Leinster team, Dublin, in the first preliminary quarter final, while the runners-up, Westmeath, met Cork, the third-placed team from Munster, in the other preliminary quarter final.

7 July 2019	Westmeath	0–20 (20) – (43) 1–40	Cork	Mullingar
15:00		(HT: 0-09 – 0–24)		Venue: TEG Cusack Park
	Pts: K Doyle 9 (6f), E Price 4, A Clarke 2, R Greville 1, P Greville 1, S Clavin 1, C Doyle 1, J Galvin 1	Report	Gls: R O'Flynn 1 Pts: P Horgan 10 (5f), A Cadogan 5, S Kingston 5, S Harnedy 5, R O’Flynn 4, C Lehane 4, D Fitzgibbon 3, B Cooper 1, T O’Mahony 1, J Coughlan 1, D Dalton 1	Referee: P Murphy (Carlow)

7 July 2019	Laois	1–22 (25) – (23) 0–23	Dublin	Portlaoise
16:15		(HT: 1–12 – 0–10)		Venue: O'Moore Park
	Gls: A Dunphy 1 Pts: M Kavanagh 9 (7f, 1 65), W Dunphy 4, C Dwyer 2, E Rowland 2, A Dunphy 2, J Kelly 1, P Purcell 1, R King 1	Report	Pts: O O'Rorke 13 (11f, 1 65), C Boland 3, R Hayes 2, D Sutcliffe 2, S Moran 1, E Dillon 1, C Keaney 1	Referee: A Kelly (Galway)

== Quarter-finals ==
The beaten Leinster and Munster finalists played the winners of the two preliminary quarter-finals. If a third-place finisher from a provincial round-robin won their preliminary quarter-final, they would have been kept apart from the team they had already met in the round-robin phase to prevent a repeat fixture. Both games were held at neutral venues.

14 July 2019 All-Ireland quarter-final	Kilkenny	2–27 (33) – (27) 3–18	Cork	Dublin
14:00		(HT: 2–10 – 1–11)		Venue: Croke Park
	Gls: C Fennelly 1, R Hogan 1 Pts: TJ Reid 10 (10f), W Walsh 3, R Hogan 2, J Donnelly 2, C Fogarty 2, B Ryan 2, C Fennelly 1, C Browne 1, A Mullen 1, R Leahy 1, E Murphy 1 (1f), B Sheehan 1	Report	Gls: P Horgan 3 (1p); Pts: P Horgan 10 (8f), A Cadogan 4, S Harnedy 2, M Coleman 1, D Fitzgibbon 1	Referee: J Owens (Wexford); Attendance: 44,135; TV: RTÉ

14 July 2019 All-Ireland quarter-final	Tipperary	2–25 (31) – (21) 1–18	Laois	Dublin
16:00		(HT: 2–11 – 1–10)		Venue: Croke Park
	Gls: J Forde 1 (1p), S Callanan 1 Pts: J Forde 12 (10f), S Callanan 2, G Browne 2, N McGrath 2, J McGrath 2, R Maher 2, A Flynn 1, Padraic Maher 1	Report	Gls: R King 1, Pts: M Kavanagh 10 (10f), A Dunphy 2, J Kelly 1, W Dunphy 1, J Lennon 1, P Purcell 1	Referee: C Lyons (Cork); Attendance: 44,135; TV: RTÉ

== Semi-finals ==
The Leinster and Munster champions played the winners of the two quarter-finals. The semi-finals took place at Croke Park in the last weekend of July.

27 July 2019 All-Ireland semi-final	Limerick	2–17 (23) – (24) 1–21	Kilkenny	Dublin
18:00				Venue: Croke Park
	Gls: A Gillane 1 (pen), S Dowling 1. Pts: A Gillane 9 (6f), G Mulcahy 2, D Byrnes (1f, 1 65) 2, T Morrissey 1, P Casey 1, B Nash 1, D Reidy 1.	Report	Gls: C Fennelly 1 Pts: TJ Reid 8 (7f, 1 sideline), A Mullen 4, C Fennelly 3, W Walsh 2, P Walsh 1, J Donnelly 1, R Hogan 1, J Maher 1.	Referee: A Kelly (Galway); Attendance: 55,001; TV: RTE; Sky Sports

28 July 2019 All-Ireland semi-final	Wexford	3–20 (29) – (31) 1–28	Tipperary	Dublin
15:30		(HT: 1–14 – 1–12)		Venue: Croke Park
	Gls: C McDonald 2, L Chin 1. Pts: L Chin 7, (6f, 1 65), R O'Connor 3, P Morris 2, D O'Keeffe 2, L Ryan 1, P Foley 1, L Og McGovern 1, K Foley 1, J O Connor 1, C McDonald 1.	Report	Gls: S Callanan 1. Pts: J Forde 12 (8f, 2 65s), N McGrath 4, J O'Dwyer 3, R Maher 2, S Callanan 2, M Breen 1, G Browne 1, W Connors 1, M Kehoe 1, J Morris 1.	Referee: S Cleere (Kilkenny); Attendance: 61,852; TV: RTE; Sky Sports

== Final ==
RTÉ
Sky Sports

18 August 2019
15:30 IST (UTC+01:00)
All-Ireland Final

Report

Kilkenny	0–20 (20) – (34) 3–25	Tipperary
(HT: 0–11 – 1-09)
Pts: TJ Reid 11 (10f), J Donnelly 3, B Ryan 2, P Walsh 1, R Hogan 1, C Fennelly 1, W Walsh 1		Gls: S Callanan 1, J O’Dwyer 1, N O’Meara 1 Pts: J Forde 8 (5f, 2 ‘65), J McGrath 3, S Callanan 2 (1f), J O’Dwyer 2, N McGrath 2 (1f), S Kennedy 2, W Connors 2, M Breen 1, G Browne 1, J Morris 1, M Kehoe 1

Croke Park, Dublin
Referee: J Owens (Wexford)
Attendance: 82,300

== Stadiums and locations ==
=== Teams and venues ===
Each team has a nominal home stadium for the round-robin series of the provincial championships.

In the knockout stage, teams from the provincial round-robin series will not have home advantage, if avoidable. The only teams to play knockout games at home are the two Joe McDonagh Cup finalists, who have home advantage in the preliminary quarter-finals. The Munster final was held at a neutral venue which was decided based on the qualifying teams, while the locations of the two quarter-finals were decided based on similar considerations. The Leinster final, and the semi-finals and final of the All-Ireland series are held in the 82,300-capacity Croke Park in Dublin, headquarters of the GAA.

County	Location	Stadium	Capacity
From the Leinster Championship
Carlow	Carlow	Netwatch Cullen Park	21,000
Dublin	Dublin	Parnell Park	8,500
Galway	Galway	Pearse Stadium	26,197
Kilkenny	Kilkenny	Nowlan Park	27,800
Wexford	Wexford	Innovate Wexford Park	25,000
From the Munster Championship
Clare	Ennis	Cusack Park, Ennis	19,000
Cork	Cork	Páirc Uí Chaoimh	45,000
Limerick	Limerick	Gaelic Grounds	49,886
Tipperary	Thurles	Semple Stadium	53,000
Waterford	Waterford	Walsh Park	11,046
From the Joe McDonagh Cup
Laois	Laois	O'Moore Park	18,000
Westmeath	Westmeath	Cusack Park, Mullingar	11,000

== Statistics ==
=== Top scorers ===
==== Top scorers overall ====
Rank	Player	County	Tally	Total	Matches	Average
1	T. J. Reid	Kilkenny	5–83	98	8	12.25
2	Patrick Horgan	Cork	7–62	83	6	13.83
3	Jason Forde	Tipperary	2–67	73	8	9.12
4	Aaron Gillane	Limerick	3–50	59	6	9.83
5	Lee Chin	Wexford	1–51	54	6	9.00
6	Séamus Callanan	Tipperary	8–18	42	8	5.25
7	Peter Duggan	Clare	0–40	40	4	10.00
8	Marty Kavanagh	Carlow	0–33	33	4	8.25
9	Conor McDonald	Wexford	3–15	24	6	4.00
9	John McGrath	Tipperary	2–18	24	8	3.00
9	Stephen Bennett	Waterford	1–21	24	4	6.00

==== Top scorers from open play ====
Rank	Player	County	Tally	Total	Minutes Played	Match Average
1	Séamus Callanan	Tipperary	8–17	41	560	5.13
2	Patrick Horgan	Cork	6–16	34	420	5.67
3	John McGrath	Tipperary	2–18	24	527	3.19
4	Conor McDonald	Wexford	3–13	22	415	3.71
4	John O'Dwyer	Tipperary	1–19	22	446	2.98
6	Alan Cadogan	Cork	1–18	21	310	4.74
6	Jason Forde	Tipperary	1–18	21	534	2.75
6	T. J. Reid	Kilkenny	3–12	21	559	2.63
9	Séamus Harnedy	Cork	1–17	20	395	3.54
9	Colin Fennelly	Kilkenny	3–11	20	510	2.75

==== Top scorers in a single game ====
Rank	Player	County	Tally	Total	Opposition
1	Patrick Horgan	Cork	3–10	19	Kilkenny
2	T. J. Reid	Kilkenny	2–12	18	Dublin
3	T. J. Reid	Kilkenny	2–11	17	Galway
4	Patrick Horgan	Cork	2-09	15	Clare
4	T. J. Reid	Kilkenny	1–12	15	Carlow
4	Jason Forde	Tipperary	1–12	15	Laois
7	Aaron Gillane	Limerick	1–11	14	Clare
7	Patrick Horgan	Cork	0–14	14	Tipperary
9	Patrick Horgan	Cork	1–10	13	Waterford
9	Oisín O'Rorke	Dublin	0–13	13	Laois
9	Marty Kavanagh	Carlow	0–13	13	Wexford
9	Aaron Gillane	Limerick	0–13	13	Tipperary

=== Scoring Events ===
- Widest winning margin: 23 points
  - Cork 1–40 – 0–20 Westmeath (preliminary quarter-final)
- Most goals in a match: 5
  - Kilkenny 2–22 – 3–20 Galway (Leinster SHC)
  - Kilkenny 2–27 – 3–18 Cork (quarter-final)
- Most points in a match: 60
  - Cork 1–40 – 0–20 Westmeath (preliminary quarter-final)
- Most goals by one team in a match: 3
  - Carlow 1–14 – 3–22 Kilkenny (Leinster SHC)
  - Clare 0–17 – 3–21 Tipperary (Munster SHC)
  - Kilkenny 2–22 – 3–20 Galway (Leinster SHC)
  - Kilkenny 2–27 – 3–18 Cork (quarter-final)
  - Tipperary 1–28 – 3–20 Wexford (semi-final)
  - Tipperary 3–25 – 0–20 Kilkenny (final)
- Most goals without winning: 3
  - Kilkenny 2–27 – 3–18 Cork (quarter-final)
  - Tipperary 1–28 – 3–20 Wexford (semi-final)
- Highest scoring match: 63 points
  - Cork 1–40 – 0–20 Westmeath (preliminary quarter-final)
- Lowest scoring match: 32 points
  - Galway 0–16 – 0–16 Wexford (Leinster SHC)

== Miscellaneous ==
- The Leinster Championship meeting between Carlow and Kilkenny was their first championship meeting since 20 June 1993.
- On 19 May, Patrick Horgan of Cork became only the fifth player ever to record a cumulative total of 400 points in the championship.
- Galway's Micheál Donoghue became the first manager to secure three victories over Brian Cody's Kilkenny in the championship.
- Kilkenny suffered their first home championship defeat at Nowlan Park since 1949.
- The Munster final between Limerick and Tipperary was their first meeting at this stage of the championship since 2001.
- Wexford won their first Leinster championship since 2004, and reached the All-Ireland semi-finals for the first time since 2007.
- The All-Ireland preliminary quarter-final was the first ever championship meeting between Cork and Westmeath.
- Laois reached the All-Ireland quarter-finals for the first time since 1979.
- Cork scored forty points in the preliminary quarter-final against Westmeath, a record (they won 1–40 to 0–20). The previous record was 35, scored by Waterford against Offaly in 2017.
- Patrick Horgan scored a hat-trick for Cork against Kilkenny, but ended on the losing side. The last time this happened was Séamus Callanan in 2015, who scored a hat-trick for Tipperary as they lost to Galway.
- This is the very first time two teams beaten in their respective provincial finals meet at the Final stage.
- Tipperary become the first team to win two All-Ireland Senior Hurling Championships by qualifying back into the All-Ireland series through the back door system. The first time they achieved this feat was in 2010.

== Live television coverage ==
RTÉ, the national broadcaster in Ireland, will provide the majority of the live television coverage of the hurling championship in the third year of a five-year deal running from 2017 until 2021. Sky Sports will also broadcast a number of matches and will have exclusive rights to some games.

Live Hurling on TV Schedule
Date	Fixture & Match Details	Broadcaster
Leinster & Munster Championships
11 May	Kilkenny v Dublin; Leinster Round 1	Sky Sports
12 May	Waterford v Clare; Munster Round 1	RTÉ
12 May	Cork v Tipperary; Munster Round 1	RTÉ
19 May	Tipperary v Waterford; Munster Round 2	RTÉ
19 May	Limerick v Cork; Munster Round 2	RTÉ
26 May	Galway v Wexford; Leinster Round 3	RTÉ
2 June	Waterford v Limerick; Munster Round 3	RTÉ
2 June	Clare v Tipperary; Munster Round 3	RTÉ
8 June	Cork v Waterford; Munster Round 4	Sky Sports
9 June	Kilkenny v Galway; Leinster Round 4	RTÉ
9 June	Limerick v Clare; Munster Round 4	RTÉ
15 June	Wexford v Kilkenny; Leinster Round 5	Sky Sports
16 June	Tipperary v Limerick; Munster Round 5	RTÉ
30 June	Limerick v Tipperary; Munster Final	RTÉ
30 June	Wexford v Kilkenny; Leinster Final	RTÉ
All-Ireland Hurling Championship
14 July	Kilkenny v Cork; All-Ireland Quarter-Final	RTÉ
14 July	Tipperary v Laois; All-Ireland Quarter-Final	RTÉ
27 July	Limerick v Kilkenny; All-Ireland Semi-Final	RTÉ; Sky Sports
28 July	Wexford v Tipperary; All-Ireland Semi-Final	RTÉ; Sky Sports
18 August	Kilkenny v Tipperary; All-Ireland Final	RTÉ; Sky Sports

== Awards ==
Sunday Game Team of the Year

The Sunday Game team of the year was picked on 18 August, which was the night of the final. The panel consisting of Brendan Cummins, Cyril Farrell, Jackie Tyrell, Ursula Jacob, Graeme Mulcahy, Derek McGrath and Enda Rowland picked Noel McGrath as the Sunday game player of the year while Kilkenny's Adrian Mullen was selected as Young Hurler of the Year.

1. Eoin Murphy (Kilkenny)
2. Sean Finn (Limerick)
3. Ronan Maher (Tipperary)
4. Cathal Barrett (Tipperary)
5. Brendan Maher (Tipperary)
6. Padraig Walsh (Kilkenny)
7. Padraic Maher (Tipperary)
8. Diarmuid O’Keeffe (Wexford)
9. Noel McGrath (Tipperary)
10. Lee Chin (Wexford)
11. TJ Reid (Kilkenny)
12. Colin Fennelly (Kilkenny)
13. Aaron Gillane (Limerick)
14. Seamus Callanan (Tipperary)
15. Patrick Horgan (Cork)

All Star Team of the Year

On 1 November, the 2019 PwC All-Stars winners were presented at Dublin's Convention Centre. Séamus Callanan was named as the All Stars Hurler of the Year with Adrian Mullen named the All Stars Young Hurler of the Year.

Pos.	Player	Team	Appearances
GK	Brian Hogan	Tipperary	1
RCB	Seán Finn	Limerick	2
FB	Ronan Maher	Tipperary	2
LCB	Cathal Barrett	Tipperary	2
RWB	Brendan Maher	Tipperary	3
CB	Pádraig Walsh	Kilkenny	2
LWB	Pádraic Maher	Tipperary	6
MD	Noel McGrath	Tipperary	3
MD	Diarmuid O'Keeffe	Wexford	1
RWF	Lee Chin	Wexford	1
CF	T. J. Reid	Kilkenny	4
LWF	Colin Fennelly	Kilkenny	2
RCF	Aaron Gillane	Limerick	1
FF	Séamus Callanan^{HOTY}	Tipperary	4
LCF	Patrick Horgan	Cork	4

== See also ==
- 2019 Leinster Senior Hurling Championship
- 2019 Munster Senior Hurling Championship
- 2019 Joe McDonagh Cup (Tier 2)
- 2019 Christy Ring Cup (Tier 3)
- 2019 Nicky Rackard Cup (Tier 4)
- 2019 Lory Meagher Cup (Tier 5)
