= 2019 Munster Senior Hurling Championship =

Gaelic sports contest in Ireland

Munster Senior Hurling Championship
Tournament details
- Year: 2019
- Date: 12 May–30 June
- Teams: 5
- Defending champions: Cork

Winners
- Champions: Limerick (20th win)
- Manager: John Kiely
- Captain: Declan Hannon
- Qualify for: Munster SHC Final; All-Ireland SHC

Runners-up
- Runners-up: Tipperary
- Manager: Liam Sheedy
- Captain: Séamus Callanan

Other
- Matches played: 11

The 2019 Munster Senior Hurling Championship was the 2019 installment of the annual Munster Senior Hurling Championship organised by Munster GAA.

Cork were the defending champions, but finished third in the group. Limerick defeated Tipperary in the final.

== Teams ==
The Munster championship was contested by five of the six counties from the Irish province of Munster. The exception was Kerry, traditionally the province's weakest at hurling (but strongest in football).

Team	Location	Stadium	Capacity
Clare	Ennis	Cusack Park, Ennis	19,000
Cork	Cork	Páirc Uí Chaoimh	45,000
Limerick	Limerick	Gaelic Grounds	49,886
Tipperary	Thurles	Semple Stadium	53,000
Waterford	Waterford	Walsh Park	11,046

== Personnel and colours ==
Team	Colours	Captain(s)	Manager(s)	Most recent success			Main Sponsor
Team	Colours	Captain(s)	Manager(s)	All-Ireland	Provincial	League	Main Sponsor
Clare		Patrick O'Connor	Donal Moloney; Gerry O'Connor	2013	1998	2016	Pat O'Donnell
Cork		Séamus Harnedy	John Meyler	2005	2018	1998	Chill Insurance
Limerick		Declan Hannon	John Kiely	2018	2013	2019	J. P. McManus
Tipperary		Séamus Callanan	Liam Sheedy	2016	2016	2008	Teneo
Waterford		Noel Connors	Páraic Fanning	1959	2010	2015	TQS Integration

== Group table ==
Key to colours
Advance to Munster final
Advance to preliminary quarter-finals

Pos	Team	Pld	W	D	L	SF	SA	Diff	Pts
1	Tipperary	4	4	0	0	8-101	1-80	42	8
2	Limerick	4	2	0	2	4-92	2-71	27	4
3	Cork	4	2	0	2	6-98	7-87	8	4
4	Clare	4	2	0	2	3-73	6-89	-25	4
5	Waterford	4	0	0	4	2-67	7-104	-52	0

Waterford did not need to play a relegation-playoff to avoid relegation to the Joe McDonagh Cup for 2020, because the winners of the 2019 Joe McDonagh Cup were from Leinster (Laois).

== Group matches ==
=== Round 1 ===
12 May 2019 Round 1	Waterford	0-22 (22) – (23) 1-20	Clare	Waterford
14:00		(HT: 0-10 - 1-13)		Venue: Walsh Park
	Pts: Stephen Bennett 11 (8f, 165), A Gleeson 4, J Barron 2, Gleeson 1, M Kearney 1, Shane Bennett 1, T Ryan 1, M Shanahan 1	Report	Gls: J Conlon 1 Pts: P Duggan 8 (7f), T Kelly 5, S Golden 1, S O’Donnell 1, J Conlon 1, P Collins 1, A McCarthy 1, R Taylor 1	Referee: James Owens (Wexford); Attendance: 11,012; TV: RTÉ

12 May 2019 Round 1	Cork	1-24 (27) – (34) 2-28	Tipperary	Cork
16:00				Venue: Páirc Uí Chaoimh
	Gls: S Harnedy 1 Pts: P Horgan 14 (10f), C Lehane 3, S Kingston 3, S Harnedy 2, T O’Mahony 1, R O’Flynn 1	Report	Gls: S Callanan 1, J McGrath 1 Pts: J O’Dwyer 7, N McGrath 4 (1 65'), S Callanan 4, J Forde 5 (3f), B Maher 2, P Maher 1, R Maher 1, M Breen 1, N O’Meara 1, P Maher 1, J McGrath 1	Referee: Seán Cleere (Kilkenny); Attendance: 30,274; TV: RTÉ

=== Round 2 ===
19 May 2019 Round 2	Tipperary	2-30 (36) – (18) 0-18	Waterford	Thurles
14:00				Venue: Semple Stadium
	Gls: J Forde 1, S Callanan 1 Pts: J Forde 9 (4f), J McGrath 5, M Breen 6, J O'Dwyer 4, N McGrath 2 (1f), R Maher 1, B Heffernan 1, J Morris 1	Report	Pts: P Mahony 9 (7f), T Ryan 3, A Gleeson 2, T de Burca 1, Stephen Bennett 1.	Referee: J Keenan (Wicklow); Attendance: 22,883; TV: RTÉ

19 May 2019 Round 2	Limerick	1-19 (22) – (29) 1-26	Cork	Limerick
16:00				Venue: LIT Gaelic Grounds
	Gls: G Mulcahy 1 Pts: A Gillane 9 (8f), G Mulcahy 4, D Byrnes 2, S Dowling 2 (2f), K Hayes 1, T Morrissey 1	Report	Gls: P Horgan 1 Pts: P Horgan 9 (6f), D Kearney 4, S Harnedy 4, A Cadogan 3, D Dalton 2, L Meade 2, D Fitzgibbon 1, C Lehane 1	Referee: P O'Dwyer (Carlow); Attendance: 31,274; TV: RTÉ

=== Round 3 ===
2 June 2019 Round 3	Waterford	0-10 (10) – (30) 2-24	Limerick	Waterford
14:00				Venue: Walsh Park
	Pts: Pauric Mahony 7 (5f), Stephen Bennett 1, J Prendergast 1, Shane Bennett 1.	Report	Gls: A Gillane 1, G Hegarty 1 Pts: A Gillane 4 (4f), S Dowling 3 (3f), K Hayes 3, P Casey 2, P O'Loughlin 2, D O'Donovan 2, D Hannon 1, T Morrissey 1, B Murphy 1, D Reidy 1, C Lynch 1, G Hegarty 1.	Referee: F Horgan (Tipperary); Attendance: 10,874; TV: RTÉ

2 June 2019 Round 3	Clare	0-17 (17) – (30) 3-21	Tipperary	Ennis
16:00				Venue: Cusack Park
	Pts: P Duggan 9 (8f), T Kelly 3 (2f), P Collins 1, D Fitzgerald 1, S Golden 1, S McCarthy 1, D Ryan 1		Gls: S Callanan 1, P Maher 1, N McGrath 1 Pts: J McGrath 6, J Forde 6 (6f), S Callanan 3, N McGrath 2, P Maher 2, J O'Dwyer 1, B Maher 1	Referee: A Kelly (Galway); Attendance: 18,216; TV: RTÉ

=== Round 4 ===
8 June 2019 Round 4	Cork	2-30 (36) – (23) 2-17	Waterford	Cork
19:00				Venue: Páirc Uí Chaoimh
	Gls: P Horgan 1, A Cadogan 1. Pts: P Horgan 10 (0-9 fs), S Harnedy 3, D Fitzgibbon 3, S Kingston 3, A Cadogan 2; M Coleman 2, T O’Mahony 2, D Kearney 1, L Meade 1, B Cooper 1, M Ellis 1, C Lehane 1.	Report	Gls: Stephen Bennett 1, Shane Bennett 1. Pts: Stephen Bennett 8 (0-7 fs); Shane Bennett 2, J Prendergast 2, P Hogan 2, J Barron 1, C Lyons 1, A Gleeson (sideline) 1.	Referee: J Keenan (Wicklow); Attendance: 26,521; TV: Sky Sports

9 June 2019 Round 4	Limerick	1-28 (31) – (13) 0-13	Clare	Limerick
16:00				Venue: LIT Gaelic Grounds
	Gls: A Gillane 1. Pts: A Gillane 11 (7 frees, 1 '65'), P Casey 4, T Morrissey 3, G Hegarty 2, G Mulcahy 2, D Byrnes 1, D Hannon 1, W O'Donoghue 1, K Hayes 1, D O'Donovan 1, S Dowling 1.	Report	Pts: P Duggan 11 (8 frees, 1 line 'cut'), C Galvin 1, T Kelly 1.	Referee: J Owens (Wexford); Attendance: 29,611; TV: RTÉ

=== Round 5 ===
16 June 2019 Round 5	Clare	2-23 (29) – (24) 2-18	Cork	Ennis
14:00				Venue: Cusack Park
	Gls: T Kelly 1, S O'Donnell 1. Pts: P Duggan 12 (9f), C Galvin 3, T Kelly 2, D Ryan 2, C McInerney 2, J Conlon 1, A McCarthy 1.	Report	Gls: P Horgan 2. Pts: P Horgan 9 (8f), A Cadogan 4, D Fitzgibbon 2, D Kearney 1, S Harnedy 1, S Kingston 1.	Referee: P O'Dwyer (Carlow); Attendance: 16,856

16 June 2019 Round 5	Tipperary	1-22 (25) – (21) 0-21	Limerick	Thurles
14:00				Venue: Semple Stadium
	Gls: S Callanan 1. Pts: J Forde 9 (4f, 2 sideline), S Callanan 4, P Maher 2, N McGrath (1f) 2, B Maher 1, M Breen 1, J Morris 1, J McGrath 1, J O'Dwyer 1.	Report	Pts: A Gillane 13 (9f, 1 '65), T Morrissey 3, D Byrnes 2 (1 '65), S Dowling 1, G Mulcahy 1, C Lynch 1.	Referee: S Cleere (Kilkenny); Attendance: 39,115; TV: RTÉ

== Final ==
RTÉ

30 June 2019
14:00
Munster Final

Report

Limerick	2-26 (32) – (20) 2-14	Tipperary
(HT: 1-11 - 1-09)
Gls: P Casey 1, K Hayes 1. Pts: P Casey 5, T Morrissey 4, A Gillane (3f) 4, G Hegarty 3, D Byrnes (3f) 3, K Hayes 2, G Mulcahy 2, B Nash 1.		Gls: S Callanan 1, J McGrath 1. Pts: J Forde 6 (3f), R Maher 2, N McGrath (1f) 1, S Callanan 1, D McCormack 1, J O’Dwyer 1, J Morris 1, J Cahill 1.

LIT Gaelic Grounds, Limerick
Referee: P O'Dwyer (Carlow)
Attendance: 44,052

== See also ==
- 2019 All-Ireland Senior Hurling Championship
  - 2019 Leinster Senior Hurling Championship
  - 2019 Joe McDonagh Cup
