= Munster Hurler of the Year =

The Munster Hurler of the Year is an annual award given to the player who is adjudged to have been the best during the Munster Senior Championship. The current holder is Séamus Harnedy, who won the award for his performances throughout the 2018 Munster Championship for Cork.

== Winners ==
Year		Player	County	Also won	Notes
2007	Border	Dan Shanahan	Waterford	GAA Hurler of the Year	
2008	Border	Shane McGrath	Tipperary	GAA All-Star	
2009	Border	Brendan Cummins	Tipperary		
2010	Border	Michael Walsh	Waterford	GAA All-Star	
2011	Border	Lar Corbett	Tipperary	GAA/GPA All-Star	
2012	Border	Patrick Maher	Tipperary		
2013	Border	Richie McCarthy	Limerick	GAA/GPA All-Star	
2014	Border	Patrick Horgan	Cork		
2015	Border	John O'Dwyer	Tipperary		
2016	Border	John McGrath	Tipperary	GAA/GPA All-Star	
2017	Border	Mark Coleman	Cork	GAA/GPA All-Star	
2018	Border	Séamus Harnedy	Cork	GAA/GPA All-Star	
2019					
