= 2018 Munster Senior Hurling Championship =

Irish hurling tournament

Munster Senior Hurling Championship
Tournament details
- Year: 2018
- Date: 20 May–1 July
- Teams: 5
- Defending champions: Cork

Winners
- Champions: Cork (54th win)
- Manager: John Meyler
- Captain: Séamus Harnedy
- Qualify for: Munster SHC Final; All-Ireland SHC

Runners-up
- Runners-up: Clare
- Manager: Donal Moloney; Gerry O'Connor
- Captain: Patrick O'Connor

Other
- Matches played: 11

The 2018 Munster Senior Hurling Championship was the 2018 installment of the annual Munster Senior Hurling Championship organised by Munster GAA.

This was the first year of a new format.

Cork won a second consecutive title by defeating Clare in the final.

== Format ==
A new provincial hurling championship featuring five-team round-robin groups in both Leinster and Munster and the new Joe McDonagh Cup was introduced in 2018 for an initial three-year period. The proposal was carried by a narrow margin with 62% voting in favour (a majority of at least 60% was required) at the GAA's Special Congress on 30 September 2017. The top two teams in each provincial group would contest the provincial final, with the provincial winners advancing to the All-Ireland semi-finals and the losing provincial finalists advancing to the two quarter-finals.

An amendment to the motion from Laois, Offaly and Meath was carried by 87%. The third-placed teams in Leinster and Munster would compete in All-Ireland preliminary quarter-finals against the two Joe McDonagh Cup finalists, with the Joe McDonagh Cup teams having home advantage.

If a non-Munster team were to win the Joe McDonagh Cup, the bottom team in the Leinster championship would be relegated to the following year's Joe McDonagh Cup and would be replaced in the following year's Leinster championship by the Joe McDonagh Cup winners. If a Munster team were to win the Joe McDonagh Cup, they would play off against the team who finished bottom in the Munster championship for the right to play in the following year's Munster championship, thereby ensuring that only Munster teams compete in the Munster championship.

The restructure of hurling involved the reduction of the Leinster championship from nine teams to five while the Munster championship continued with the previous five Munster teams (Kerry previously competed in the qualifier group of the Leinster championship). A six-team Joe McDonagh Cup was created, consisting of all four teams from the 2017 Leinster qualifier group plus Antrim and Carlow, the 2017 Christy Ring Cup finalists.

== Teams ==
The Munster championship was contested by five of the six counties from the Irish province of Munster. The exception was Kerry, traditionally the province's weakest at hurling (but strongest in football).

Team	Location	Stadium	Capacity
Clare	Ennis	Cusack Park	19,000
Cork	Cork	Páirc Uí Chaoimh	45,000
Limerick	Limerick	Gaelic Grounds	49,886
Tipperary	Thurles	Semple Stadium	53,000
Waterford	—N/a	—N/a	n/a

== Personnel and colours ==
Team	Colours	Main sponsor	Captain(s)	Manager(s)	Most recent success
Team	Colours	Main sponsor	Captain(s)	Manager(s)	All-Ireland	Provincial	League
Clare		Pat O'Donnell	Patrick O'Connor	Donal Moloney; Gerry O'Connor	2013	1998	2016
Cork		Chill Insurance	Séamus Harnedy	John Meyler	2005	2017	1998
Limerick		Sporting Limerick	Declan Hannon	John Kiely	2018	2013	1997
Tipperary		Intersport/Elverys	Pádraic Maher	Michael Ryan	2016	2016	2008
Waterford		TQS Integration		Derek McGrath	1959	2010	2015

== Group table ==
Pos	Team	Pld	W	D	L	SF	SA	Diff	Pts
1	Cork	4	2	2	0	5-94 (109)	4-89 (101)	+8	6
2	Clare	4	3	0	1	4-97 (109)	5-77 (92)	+17	6
3	Limerick	4	2	1	1	3-92 (101)	4-81 (93)	+8	5
4	Tipperary	4	0	2	2	7-77 (98)	5-91 (106)	–8	2
5	Waterford	4	0	1	3	6-76 (94)	7-98 (119)	–25	1
Green background The top two teams contested the Munster Final, with the winners advancing to the All-Ireland semi-finals and the losers advancing to the All-Ireland quarter-finals. Yellow background The third-placed team advanced to the All-Ireland preliminary quarter-finals. As the 2018 Joe McDonagh Cup was won by Carlow (a Leinster county), there was no relegation/promotion play-off between the bottom team in the Munster group and the Joe McDonagh Cup winners for the right to compete in next year's Munster championship. Cork are ranked ahead of Clare as they won the head-to-head game between the teams.

== Group matches ==
=== Round 1 ===
20 May 2018 Round 1	Limerick	1-23 (26) – (20) 2-14	Tipperary	Limerick
14:00		(HT: 0-12 – 1-10)		Venue: Gaelic Grounds
	Gls: B Murphy 1 Pts: A Gillane 8 (6f), G Mulcahy 4, D Byrnes 3 (2 '65', 1f), C Lynch 2, G Hegarty 2, T Morrissey 2, D O'Donovan 1, S Flanagan 1	Report	Gls: D McCormack 1, J Forde 1 Pts: J Forde 9 (9f), N McGrath 2, J McGrath 2, J O'Dwyer 1	Referee: James McGrath (Westmeath); Attendance: 20,403; TV: RTÉ

20 May 2018 Round 1	Cork	2-23 (29) – (24) 1-21	Clare	Cork
16:00		(HT: 0-11 – 0-10)		Venue: Páirc Uí Chaoimh
	Gls: C Lehane 1, S Harnedy 1 Pts: P Horgan 10 (6f), D Fitzgibbon 3, C Lehane 2, S Harnedy 2, M Ellis 2, M Coleman 1, B Cooper 1, R O'Flynn 1, D Brosnan 1	Report	Gls: T Kelly 1 Pts: J Conlon 5, P Duggan 4 (4f), C Galvin 3, D Reidy 3 (2f), T Kelly 3 (1f), S O'Donnell 2, C McGrath 1	Referee: Sean Cleere (Kilkenny); Attendance: 24,490; TV: RTÉ

=== Round 2 ===
27 May 2018 Round 2	Tipperary	2-20 (26) – (26) 1-23	Cork	Thurles
14:00				Venue: Semple Stadium
	Gls: J Forde 1, N McGrath 1 Pts: J Forde 6 (4f, 2 '65'), J McGrath 5, N McGrath 3, B Maher 1, S Callanan 1, Patrick Maher 1, B McCarthy 1, J O'Dwyer 1, J Morris 1	Report	Gls: S Kingston 1 Pts: S Kingston 5, P Horgan 5 (3f), S Harnedy 5, D Kearney 4, B Cooper 2, C Lehane 2	Referee: James Keenan (Wicklow); Attendance: 22,456; TV: RTÉ

27 May 2018 Round 2	Clare	2-27 (33) – (24) 2-18	Waterford	Ennis
15:30				Venue: Cusack Park
	Gls: P Duggan 1 (pen), J Conlon 1 Pts: P Duggan 10 (9f, 1 '65'), T Kelly 6, J Conlon 3, J Shanahan 2, C Galvin 2, D Fitzgerald 1, C McGrath 1, S O'Donnell 1, D Reidy 1	Report	Gls: M Shanahan 1, T Ryan 1 Pts: M Shanahan 6 (6f), Stephen Bennett 2, Jake Dillon 2, T de Burca 1, C Gleeson 1, Philip Mahony 1, T Devine 1, K Moran 1, J Barron 1, DJ Foran 1, T Ryan 1	Referee: Paud O'Dwyer (Carlow); Attendance: 13,736

=== Round 3 ===
2 June 2018 Round 3	Cork	1-25 (28) – (28) 0-28	Limerick	Cork
19:00		(HT: 0-14 – 0-12)		Venue: Páirc Uí Chaoimh
	Gls: P Horgan 1 Pts: P Horgan 11 (8f, 3 '65'), D Fitzgibbon 4, C Lehane 3, D Kearney 2, S Kingston 2, L Meade 1, M Coleman 1, C Spillane 1	Report	Pts: T Morrissey 8 (5f), S Flanagan 6, C Lynch 3, D O'Donovan 2, G Mulcahy 2, D Byrnes 2 (2f), K Hayes 2, G Hegarty 1, D Morrissey 1, A Gillane 1	Referee: James Owens (Wexford); Attendance: 34,607; TV: Sky Sports

3 June 2018 Round 3	Waterford	2-22 (28) – (28) 2-22	Tipperary	Limerick
16:00		(HT: 2-12 – 0-12)		Venue: Gaelic Grounds
	Gls: Pauric Mahony 1, T Devine 1 Pts: Pauric Mahony 8 (5f), J Barron 3, DJ Foran 3, T Devine 2, Philip Mahony 1, S Bennett 1, P Curran 1, T Ryan 1, J Dillon 1	Report	Gls: J Forde 1 Pts: J Forde 14 (11f), R Maher 3, S Callanan 2, J McGrath 2, B McCarthy 1, N McGrath 1, J O'Dwyer 1 P Maher 1, C Barrett 1	Referee: Alan Kelly (Galway); Attendance: 10,237; TV: RTÉ

=== Round 4 ===
10 June 2018 Round 4	Limerick	2-26 (32) – (19) 1-16	Waterford	Limerick
		(HT: 2-14 – 0-7)		Venue: Gaelic Grounds
	Gls: G Hegarty 1, G Mulcahy 1 Pts: S Dowling 15 (13f), C Lynch 3, T Morrissey 2, K Hayes 2, G Hegarty 1, S Flanagan 1, D O'Donovan 1, D Dempsey 1	Report	Gls: T Ryan 1 Pts: Pauric Mahony 10 (9f), DJ Foran 1, S Bennett 1, T Devine 1, M Shanahan 1, M Kearney 1, S O'Keeffe 1	Referee: Seán Cleere (Kilkenny); Attendance: 23,194

10 June 2018 Round 4	Tipperary	1-21 (24) – (26) 1-23	Clare	Thurles
		(HT: 1-10 – 0-9)		Venue: Semple Stadium
	Gls: B McCarthy 1 Pts: J Forde 10 (8f, 1 '65'), J McGrath 3, S Callanan 2, N McGrath 2, R Maher 1, C Barrett 1, Pádraic Maher 1, Patrick Maher 1	Report	Gls: I Galvin 1 Pts: P Duggan 15 (13f), P Collins 3, T Kelly 2, J Conlon 2, J Browne 1	Referee: Paud O'Dwyer (Carlow); Attendance: 20,782; TV: RTÉ

=== Round 5 ===
17 June 2018 Round 5	Clare	0-26 (26) – (15) 0-15	Limerick	Ennis
		(HT: 0-13 – 0-9)		Venue: Cusack Park
	Pts: P Duggan 13 (10f, 1 '65'), T Kelly 5 (1 '65'), J Conlon 4, D Fitzgerald 2, J Shanahan 1, C Galvin 1	Report	Pts: S Dowling 4 (4f), T Morrissey 3, K Hayes 1, D O'Donovan 1 (sl), C Lynch 1, D Byrnes 1, G Hegarty 1, D Morrissey 1, S Flanagan 1, A Gillane 1	Referee: James Owens (Westmeath); Attendance: 18,803; TV: RTÉ

17 June 2018 Round 5	Waterford	1-20 (23) – (26) 1-23	Cork	Thurles
				Venue: Semple Stadium
	Gls: T Ryan 1 Pts: Pauric Mahony 8 (4f, 1 '65'), T Ryan 3, B O'Halloran 2, J Dillon 2, T Devine 1, J Barron 1, A Gleeson 1, DJ Foran 1, M Shanahan 1	Report	Gls: S Harnedy 1 Pts: P Horgan 5 (2f, 1 '65'), S Harnedy 3, B Cooper 4, C Lehane 3, M Coleman 2 (1 sl), S Kingston 2, D Kearney 2, D Fitzgibbon 1, C Joyce 1	Referee: John Keenan (Wicklow); Attendance: 14,737

== Final ==
The winning team advanced to the All-Ireland semi-finals, while the losing team advanced to the All-Ireland quarter-finals.

RTÉ

1 July 2018
14:00
Munster Final

Report

Cork	2-24 (30) – (28) 3-19	Clare
(HT: 1-10 – 2-11)
Gls: S Harnedy 1, L Meade 1 Pts: P Horgan 11 (6f, 1 '65'), S Harnedy 4, M Coleman 2 (1 sl), D Fitzgibbon 2, D Kearney 2, C Lehane 1, L Meade 1, B Cooper 1		Gls: P Duggan 1, D Reidy 1, I Galvin 1 Pts: P Duggan 7 (6f), J Conlon 5, D Reidy 2, P Collins 2, C McGrath 1, T Kelly 1, C Galvin 1

Semple Stadium, Thurles
Referee: J McGrath (Westmeath)
Attendance: 45,364

== See also ==
- 2018 All-Ireland Senior Hurling Championship
  - 2018 Leinster Senior Hurling Championship
  - 2018 Joe McDonagh Cup
