= Christopher Joyce (hurler) =

Irish hurler

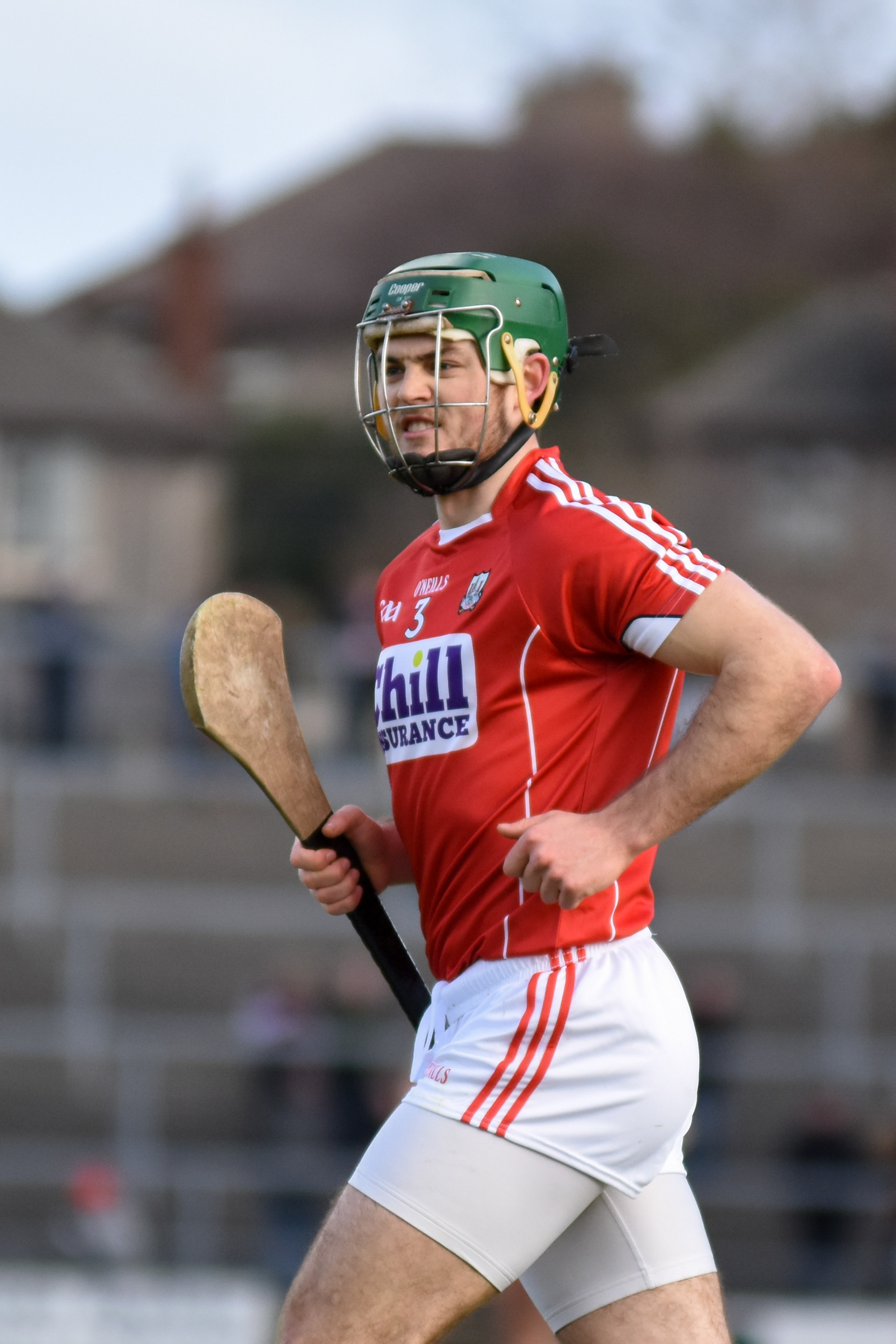
- Christopher Joyce in 2016

Personal information
- Native name: Cristóir Seoighe (Irish)
- Height: 1.85 m (6 ft 1 in)

Sport
- Sport: Hurling
- Position: Right wing-back
Club
- Years: Club
- 2009-present: Na Piarsaigh
Club titles
- Cork titles: 0
Inter-county*
Years	County	Apps (scores)
2012-2020	Cork	31 (0-04)
Inter-county titles
- Munster titles: 3
- All-Irelands: 0
- NHL: 0
- All Stars: 0
- *Inter County team apps and scores correct as of 18:52, 14 November 2020.

Christopher Joyce is an Irish hurler who plays for Cork Senior Championship club Na Piarsaigh. He usually lines out as a right wing-back. Joyce is a former member of the Cork senior hurling team.

== Playing career ==
=== Na Piarsaigh ===
Joyce joined the Na Piarsaigh club at a young age and enjoyed some success at juvenile and underage levels, including winning a Féile na nGael title in 2006 after a 1-05 to 1-04 defeat of Athenry in the final.

On 7 December 2013, Joyce enjoyed his first success at adult level when he was at centre-back for Na Piarsaigh's 0-20 to 2-09 Cork Senior Hurling League final defeat of Sarsfields.

=== Cork ===
==== Minor & under-21 ====
Joyce first played for Cork as a member of the minor team. He made his first appearance on 24 June 2009 when he was introduced as a 59th-minute substitute for clubmate Patrick O'Rourke in a 5-17 apiece Munster Championship draw with Tipperary. Joyce ended his tenure at minor level following a 2-17 to 1-13 defeat by Waterford on 7 July 2010.

On 15 July 2011, Joyce made his debut in the under-21 grade in a 4-19 to 1-21 defeat of Tipperary. He was at right corner-back in the subsequent 1-27 to 4-20 Munster final defeat by Limerick.

Joyce captained the Cork under-21 team on 17 July 2013. The 5-19 to 2-13 defeat by Tipperary was his last game in the grade.

==== Senior ====
On 7 July 2012 Joyce made his senior championship debut in a 1-26 to 2-16 defeat of Offaly in the All-Ireland qualifiers. He became Cork's first choice centre-back for the championship the following year, lining out in his first Munster decider, however, Cork faced a 0-24 to 0-15 defeat by Limerick. On 8 September 2013 Joyce lined out against Clare in his first All-Ireland final. Three second-half goals through Conor Lehane, Anthony Nash and Pa Cronin, and a tenth point of the game from Patrick Horgan gave Cork a one-point lead as injury time came to an end. A last-gasp point from corner-back Domhnall O'Donovan earned Clare a 0-25 to 3-16 draw. The replay on 28 September was regarded as one of the best in recent years. Clare's Shane O'Donnell was a late addition to the team, and went on to score a hat-trick of goals in the first nineteen minutes of the game. Patrick Horgan top scored for Cork, however, further goals from Conor McGrath and Darach Honan secured a 5-16 to 3-16 victory for Clare.

In 2014 Joyce won his first Munster medal as goals by Séamus Harnedy and Paudie O'Sullivan gave Cork a 2-24 to 0-24 victory over Limerick in the provincial decider.

Joyce won his second Munster Championship medal on 9 July 2017 when he played at right wing-back in Cork's 1-25 to 1-20 defeat of Clare in the final.

On 1 July 2018, Joyce won a third Munster Championship medal following a 2-24 to 3-19 defeat of Clare in the final.

On 7 December 2020, it was reported in the Irish Examiner that Joyce would not be involved with the Cork senior hurling team for the 2021 season.

== Career statistics ==
Team	Year	National League			Munster		All-Ireland		Total	
Team	Year	Division	Apps	Score	Apps	Score	Apps	Score	Apps	Score
Cork	2012	Division 1A	0	0-00	0	0-00	1	0-00	1	0-00
Cork	2013	Division 1A	6	0-01	2	0-00	4	0-00	12	0-01
Cork	2014	Division 1B	6	0-01	4	0-01	1	0-00	11	0-02
Cork	2015	Division 1A	3	0-00	—		—		3	0-00
Cork	2016	Division 1A	6	0-00	1	0-00	2	0-00	9	0-00
Cork	2017	Division 1A	6	0-01	3	0-00	1	0-00	10	0-01
Cork	2018	Division 1A	6	0-00	5	0-01	1	0-01	12	0-02
Cork	2019	Division 1A	5	0-00	3	0-00	2	0-00	10	0-00
Cork	2020	Division 1A	1	0-00	1	0-01	0	0-00	2	0-01
Career total			39	0-03	19	0-03	12	0-01	70	0-07

== Honours ==
Na Piarsaigh

- Cork Senior Hurling League (1): 2013
- Féile na nGael (1): 2006

Cork

- Munster Senior Hurling Championship (3): 2014, 2017, 2018

Sporting positions
Preceded by Conor Lehane	Cork Under-21 Hurling Captain; 2013	Succeeded by Killian Burke
