= 2018 Munster Senior Hurling Championship final =

- Event: 2018 Munster Senior Hurling Championship
Cork	Clare
2–24	3–19
- Date: 1 July 2018
- Venue: Semple Stadium, Thurles
- Man of the Match: Séamus Harnedy
- Referee: James McGrath (Westmeath)
- Attendance: 45,364
- Weather: Sunny

The 2018 Munster Senior Hurling Championship final was played on 1 July 2018 at Semple Stadium, Thurles. The winner would advance to the semi-finals of the All-Ireland Senior Hurling Championship, with the loser entering the,

All-Ireland quarter-finals.

Clare and Cork contested the final for the second year in a row, with Cork retaining the title. Séamus Harnedy was the Cork captain and also was named as the man of the match.

== Build-up ==
Tickets for the final went on sale on 21 June and ranged in price from €35 to €40 in the stand and €25 to €30 in the terrace.

The match was shown live on RTÉ One as part of The Sunday Game Live, with commentary from Marty Morrissey and Brendan Cummins.

Clare were looking for their first Munster title since 1998, while Cork were the defending champions. Cork manager John Meyler was in his first year as manager, with Clare's joint managers Donal Moloney and Gerry O'Connor in their second year in charge.

== Match ==
=== Details ===
1 July 2018
Final
14:00

Cork	2-24 - 3-19	Clare
Patrick Horgan 0-11 (0-6f, 0-1 ’65), Séamus Harnedy 1-4, Luke Meade 1-1, Mark Coleman (0-1 sideline cut), Bill Cooper, Daniel Kearney 0-2 each, Conor Lehane 0-1.	Report	Peter Duggan 1-7 (0-6f), John Conlon 0-5, David Reidy 1-2, Ian Galvin 1-0, Podge Collins 0-2, Colm Galvin, Conor McGrath, Tony Kelly 0-1 each.

Semple Stadium
Attendance: 45,364
Referee: James McGrath (Westmeath)
