= Christopher Joyce =

Christopher Joyce may refer to:

- Christopher Joyce (hurler), Irish hurler
- Chris Joyce (born 1957), English drummer
- Chris Joyce (footballer), English footballer
