= Richie McCarthy =

Irish hurler (born 1987)

Personal information
- Native name: Risteard Mac Cárthaigh (Irish)
- Born: 11 October 1987 (age 39) Kilfinane, County Limerick, Ireland
- Occupation: Clerical officer
- Height: 1.8 m (5 ft 11 in)

Sport
- Sport: Hurling
- Position: Full-back
Clubs
- Years: Club
- Blackrock → Emmets
Club titles
- Limerick titles: 0
Inter-county*
Years	County	Apps (scores)
2009-2019	Limerick	26 (1-05)
Inter-county titles
- Munster titles: 1
- All-Irelands: 1
- NHL: 0
- All Stars: 1
- *Inter County team apps and scores correct as of 18:27, 20 August 2018.

Richard McCarthy (born 11 October 1987) is an Irish hurler who plays for Limerick Senior Championship club Blackrock. He played for the Limerick senior hurling team for 10 years, during which time he usually lined out as a full-back. A defender who was noted for his swashbuckling style, McCarthy was considered a "Limerick hurling fans favourite".

McCarthy began his hurling career at club level with Blackrock. After breaking onto the club's top adult team, he enjoyed his greatest success in 2010 when the club won the All-Ireland Junior Club Championship. Almost a decade later, McCarthy enjoyed further success when he won a Premier Intermediate Championship medal and promotion.

At inter-county level, McCarthy was part of the Limerick minor team that were All-Ireland Championship runners-up in 2005. He later lined out for Limerick at under-21 and intermediate levels before joining the Limerick senior team in 2009. From his debut, McCarthy lined out in a variety of positions in both defence and attack and made a combined total of 75 National League and Championship appearances in a career that ended with his last game in 2018. During that time he was part of the All-Ireland Championship-winning team in 2018. McCarthy also secured a Munster Championship medal in 2013. He announced his retirement from inter-county hurling on 25 November 2019.

McCarthy was named Munster Hurler of the Year in 2013 while he also won his only All-Star that year. He claimed a further two All-Star nominations at various stages in his career. At inter-provincial level, McCarthy was also selected to play for Munster but ended his career without a Railway Cup medal.

== Playing career ==
=== Blackrock ===
McCarthy joined the Blackrock club at a young age and played in all grades at juvenile and underage levels before joining the club's top adult team in the junior grade.

On 8 November 2009, McCarthy enjoyed his first success at adult level when he was part of the Blackrock team that secured the Limerick Junior Championship after a 2–18 to 1–16 defeat of Effin in the final. On 13 December 2009, he lined out at left wing-forward when Blackrock faced Fermoy in the Munster final. McCarthy top scored for the team with 0-06 and ended the game with a winners' medal following the 1–12 to 0–14 victory. Blackrock subsequently qualified for the All-Ireland final on 13 February 2010, with McCarthy once again lining out in attack. He top scored with 0-07 and claimed an All-Ireland medal after the 1–19 to 0–09 defeat of Naomh Colum Cille.

On 6 October 2019, McCarthy lined out at full-back when Blackrock drew 0-18 apiece with Kildimo-Pallaskenry in the Premier Intermediate Championship final. He retained his position for the replay on 26 October 2019 and ended the game with a winners' medal following the 1–18 to 0–16 victory.

=== Limerick ===
==== Minor and under-21 ====
McCarthy first played for Limerick as a member of the minor team during the 2005 Munster Championship. He made his first appearance for the team on 4 May 2005 when he came on as a substitute in Limerick's 2–14 to 1–06 defeat of Tipperary in the Munster semi-final. On 26 June 2005, McCarthy was an unused substitute when Limerick suffered a 2018 to 1–12 defeat by Cork in the Munster final. He was again an unused substitute when Limerick suffered a 3–12 to 0–17 defeat by Galway in the All-Ireland final on 11 September 2005.

McCarthy was drafted onto the Limerick under-21 starting fifteen in advance of the 2008 Munster Championship. He made his first appearance for the team on 5 June 2008 when he lined out at full-forward in Limerick's 2–17 to 1–07 defeat of Waterford in the Munster quarter-final. Limerick's subsequent defeat by Tipperary in the semi-final was his last game in the grade.

==== Intermediate ====
McCarthy was added to the Limerick intermediate team prior to the start of the 2007 Munster Championship. He made his first appearance for the team on 10 June 2007 in a 0–17 to 0–15 defeat of Tipperary. On 7 July 2007, McCarthy lined out at full-back when Limerick suffered a 5–12 to 1–12 defeat by Waterford in the Munster final.

==== Senior ====
On 8 February 2009, Condon made his first appearance for the Limerick senior team when he lined out at left corner-back in a 3–13 to 1–18 defeat of Clare in the National League. He was later included on the panel for the Championship but remained as an unused substitute throughout the campaign. At the end of a disappointing season, Limerick manager Justin McCarthy dropped several high-profile players from the panel. Over the course of the winter, many more players, including McCarthy, withdrew from the panel and refused to play while the management team remained in place. The Limerick County Board refused to remove McCarthy and contested the 2010 season with a new group of players.

McCarthy returned to the panel the following year and was a regular player under new manager Dónal O'Grady. On 30 April 2011, he scored four points from centre-forward when Limerick defeated Clare by 4–12 to 2–13 to win the National League Division 2 title.

On 14 July 2013, McCarthy lined out in his first Munster final. He was selected at full-back for Limerick's 0–24 to 0–15 defeat of Cork and a first provincial title in 17 years. Condon ended the season by being named in the full-back position on the All-Star team.

On 3 July 2014, Condon was selected at full-back when Limerick faced Cork in a second successive Munster final. He ended the game on the losing side following a 2–24 to 0–24 defeat.

On 19 August 2018, McCarthy was selected on the substitute's bench when Limerick lined out in their first All-Ireland final in 12 years. He was introduced as a 50th-minute substitute for Mike Casey at full-back and claimed a winners' medal following Limerick's 3–16 to 2–18 defeat of Galway and a first championship title in 45 years. Just two weeks after this victory it was revealed that McCarthy faced a lengthy spell on the sidelines after tearing his cruciate ligament. The injury ruled him out of the 2019 National League while he also failed to secure a place on Limerick's match-day panel for the championship.

On 25 November 2019, McCarthy announced his retirement from inter-county hurling. In a statement he said: "Today I am announcing my retirement from the Limerick Senior Hurling team. It has been an incredible 11-year journey but the time is right for me to now step away. It is the greatest honour for any GAA player to wear their county colours but it has also been the wild dreams of a youngster from Kilfinane."

== Career statistics ==
Team	Year	National League			Munster		All-Ireland		Total	
Team	Year	Division	Apps	Score	Apps	Score	Apps	Score	Apps	Score
Limerick	2009	Division 1	4	0-01	0	0-00	0	0-00	4	0-01
Limerick	2010	Division 1	—		—		—		—	
Limerick	2011	Division 2	8	1-39	1	0-03	2	1-01	11	2-43
Limerick	2012	Division 1B	6	0-00	1	0-00	4	0-01	11	0-01
Limerick	2013	Division 1B	6	0-00	2	0-00	1	0-00	9	0-00
Limerick	2014	Division 1B	3	0-00	2	0-00	2	0-00	7	0-00
Limerick	2015	Division 1B	6	0-01	2	0-00	2	0-00	10	0-01
Limerick	2016	Division 1B	7	0-00	0	0-00	2	0-00	9	0-00
Limerick	2017	Division 1B	6	0-00	1	0-00	1	0-00	8	0-00
Limerick	2018	Division 1B	3	0-00	1	0-00	2	0-00	6	0-00
Limerick	2019	Division 1B	—		—		—		—	
Total			49	1-41	10	0-03	16	1-02	75	2-46

== Honours ==
Blackrock

- Limerick Premier Intermediate Hurling Championship (1): 2019
- All-Ireland Junior Club Hurling Championship (1): 2010
- Munster Junior Club Hurling Championship (1): 2009
- Limerick Junior Hurling Championship (1): 2009
- South Limerick Junior Hurling Championship (1): 2009

Limerick

- All-Ireland Senior Hurling Championship (1): 2018
- Munster Senior Hurling Championship (1): 2013
- National Hurling League Division 2 (1): 2011
