= 2018 Leinster Senior Hurling Championship =

Leinster Senior Hurling Championship
Tournament details
- Year: 2018
- Date: 12 May–8 July
- Teams: 5
- Defending champions: Galway

Winners
- Champions: Galway (3rd win)
- Manager: Micheál Donoghue
- Captain: David Burke
- Qualify for: Leinster SHC Final; All-Ireland SHC

Runners-up
- Runners-up: Kilkenny
- Manager: Brian Cody
- Captain: Cillian Buckley

Promotion/Relegation
- Promoted team(s): Carlow
- Relegated team(s): Offaly

Other
- Matches played: 12

The 2018 Leinster Senior Hurling Championship is the 2018 installment of the annual Leinster Senior Hurling Championship organised by Leinster GAA.

This was the first year of a new format.

Galway won a second consecutive title and third ever by defeating Kilkenny in the final.

== Format ==
A new provincial hurling championship featuring five-team round-robin groups in both Leinster and Munster and the new Joe McDonagh Cup was introduced in 2018 for an initial three-year period. The proposal was carried by a narrow margin with 62% voting in favour (a majority of at least 60% was required) at the GAA's Special Congress on 30 September 2017. The top two teams in each provincial group would contest the provincial final, with the provincial winners advancing to the All-Ireland semi-finals and the losing provincial finalists advancing to the two quarter-finals.

An amendment to the motion from Laois, Offaly and Meath was carried by 87%. The third-placed teams in Leinster and Munster would compete in All-Ireland preliminary quarter-finals against the two Joe McDonagh Cup finalists, with the Joe McDonagh Cup teams having home advantage.

If a non-Munster team were to win the Joe McDonagh Cup, the bottom team in the Leinster championship would be relegated to the following year's Joe McDonagh Cup and would be replaced in the following year's Leinster championship by the Joe McDonagh Cup winners. If a Munster team were to win the Joe McDonagh Cup, they would play off against the team who finished bottom in the Munster championship for the right to play in the following year's Munster championship, thereby ensuring that only Munster teams compete in the Munster championship.

The restructure of hurling involved the reduction of the Leinster championship from nine teams to five while the Munster championship continued with the previous five Munster teams (Kerry previously competed in the qualifier group of the Leinster championship). A six-team Joe McDonagh Cup was created, consisting of all four teams from the 2017 Leinster qualifier group plus Antrim and Carlow, the 2017 Christy Ring Cup finalists.

== Teams ==
The Leinster championship was contested by four counties from the Irish province of Leinster, as well as one county from the Irish province of Connacht, where the sport is only capable of supporting one county team at this level.

Team	Location	Stadium	Capacity
Dublin	Donnycarney	Parnell Park	7,300
Galway	Galway	Pearse Stadium	26,197
Kilkenny	Kilkenny	Nowlan Park	27,800
Offaly	Tullamore	O'Connor Park	20,000
Wexford	Wexford	Wexford Park	25,000

== Personnel and colours ==
Team	Colours	Main Sponsor	Captain(s)	Manager(s)	Most recent success		
Team	Colours	Main Sponsor	Captain(s)	Manager(s)	All-Ireland	Provincial	League
Dublin		AIG	Liam Rushe	Pat Gilroy	1938	2013	2011
Galway		Supermac's	David Burke	Micheál Donoghue	2017	2017	2017
Kilkenny		Glanbia	Cillian Buckley	Brian Cody	2015	2016	2018
Offaly		Carroll Cuisine	David King	Kevin Martin	1998	1995	1990–91
Wexford		Gain	Lee Chin; Matthew O'Hanlon	Davy Fitzgerald	1996	2004	1972–73

== Group table ==
Pos	Team	Pld	W	D	L	SF	SA	Diff	Pts
1	Galway	4	4	0	0	7-89 (110)	6-62 (80)	+30	8
2	Kilkenny	4	3	0	1	5-76 (91)	6-69 (87)	+4	6
3	Wexford	4	2	0	2	6-81 (99)	5-68 (83)	+16	4
4	Dublin	4	1	0	3	9-73 (100)	1-85 (88)	+12	2
5	Offaly	4	0	0	4	5-50 (65)	14-85 (127)	–62	0
Green background The top two teams contested the Leinster Final, with the winners advancing to the All-Ireland semi-finals and the losers advancing to the All-Ireland quarter-finals. Yellow background The third-placed team advanced to the All-Ireland preliminary quarter-finals. Red background As the 2018 Joe McDonagh Cup was won by Carlow (a Leinster county), the bottom team in the Leinster group, Offaly, were relegated to the 2019 Joe McDonagh Cup.

== Group matches ==
=== Round 1 ===
12 May 2018 Round 1	Offaly	2-15 (21) – (33) 5-18	Galway	Tullamore
19:00		(HT: 1-7 – 2-9)		Venue: O'Connor Park
	Gls: S Dooley 1, J Bergin 1 Pts: S Dooley 9 (8f), D King 2, J Bergin 1, D Currams 1, E Cahill 1 (f), S Kinsella 1	Report	Gls: B Concannon 2, J Cooney 1, C Whelan 1, J Flynn 1 Pts: J Canning 8 (6f, 1 '65'), J Cooney 4, C Cooney 2, B Concannon 1, C Whelan 1, C Mannion 1, S Loftus 1	Referee: Johnny Murphy (Limerick); Attendance: 8,330

13 May 2018 Round 1	Dublin	3-16 (25) – (27) 1-24	Kilkenny	Dublin
14:00		(HT: 2-7 – 0-9)		Venue: Parnell Park
	Gls: P Ryan 1, F Whitely 1, J Malone 1 Pts: P Ryan 6 (5f), C Keaney 4, P Winters 3 (2f), T Connolly 1, C Crummey 1, F MacGibb 1	Report	Gls: L Blanchfield 1 Pts: TJ Reid 12 (9f, 2 '65'), E Murphy 4 (4f), C Fennelly 3, J Maher 2, W Walsh 2, J Donnelly 1	Referee: Diarmuid Kirwan (Cork); TV: RTÉ

=== Round 2 ===
20 May 2018 Round 2	Kilkenny	2-19 (25) – (16) 1-13	Offaly	Kilkenny
15:00		(HT: 1-10 – 0-7)		Venue: Nowlan Park
	Gls: L Blanchfield 1, TJ Reid 1 Pts: TJ Reid 5 (4f), L Scanlon 4, L Blanchfield 2, J Donnelly 2, M Keoghan 2, C Fennelly 2, R Leahy 1, E Murphy 1 (f)	Report	Gls: J Bergin 1 Pts: S Dooley 5 (4f), J Bergin 3, S Kinsella 2, O Kelly 1, C Egan 1, P Camon 1	Referee: James Owens (Wexford); Attendance: 6,996

20 May 2018 Round 2	Wexford	0-22 (22) – (20) 2-14	Dublin	Wexford
15:00		(HT: 0-10 – 1-6)		Venue: Wexford Park
	Pts: R O'Connor 12 (11f), L Chin 2, P Foley 2 (1f), D O'Keeffe 1, K Foley 1, A Nolan 1, J O'Connor 1, P Morris 1, H Kehoe 1	Report	Gls: P Ryan 1, R McBride 1 Pts: P Ryan 7 (6f, 1 '65'), R McBride 1, J Malone 1, P Smyth 1, C Boland 1, L Rushe 1, D Sutcliffe 1, D Treacy 1	Referee: Colm Lyons (Cork); Attendance: 10,248

=== Round 3 ===
26 May 2018 Round 3	Offaly	2-9 (15) – (39) 5-24	Wexford	Tullamore
14:00		(HT: 0-6 – 3-12)		Venue: O'Connor Park
	Gls: O Kelly 1, S Dooley 1 Pts: S Dooley 5 (5f), O Kelly 1, J Bergin 1, K Dunne 1, T Geraghty 1	Report	Gls: M Fanning 1 (pen), A Nolan 1, J O'Connor 1, L Chin 1, C McDonald 1 Pts: R O'Connor 7 (5f), L Chin 4 (4f), H Kehoe 3 (2f), J O'Connor 3, P Morris 2, D Reck 1, D O'Keeffe 1, K Foley 1, A Nolan 1, C McDonald 1	Referee: James McGrath (Westmeath); Attendance: 6,186

27 May 2018 Round 3	Galway	1-22 (25) – (17) 2-11	Kilkenny	Salthill
16:00		(HT: 1-9 – 1-5)		Venue: Pearse Stadium
	Gls: J Canning 1 (pen); Pts: J Canning 12 (7f, 1 '65'), C Cooney 4, C Mannion 2, B Concannon 1, David Burke 1, J Flynn 1, N Burke 1	Report	Gls: TJ Reid 1 (pen), W Walsh 1 Pts: TJ Reid 9 (8f, 1 '65'), W Walsh 1, L Scanlon 1	Referee: Fergal Horgan (Tipperary); Attendance: 18,775; TV: RTÉ

=== Round 4 ===
2 June 2018 Round 4	Wexford	0-17 (17) – (26) 1-23	Galway	Wexford
17:00		(HT: 0-9 – 1-12)		Venue: Wexford Park
	Pts: R O'Connor 12 (10f), A Nolan 2, P Morris 2, P Foley 1	Report	Gls: C Whelan 1 Pts: J Canning 12 (8f, 2 sl), C Cooney 4, D Burke 2, C Whelan 2, J Cooney 1, J Flynn 1 (1f), N Burke 1	Referee: Johnny Murphy (Limerick); Attendance: 14,500; TV: Sky Sports

3 June 2018 Round 4	Dublin	2-24 (30) – (13) 0-13	Offaly	Dublin
15:00		(HT: 1-10 – 0-5)		Venue: Parnell Park
	Gls: P Ryan 1, F Whitley 1 Pts: P Ryan 5 (4f), S Barrett 4, C Cummey 4, L Rushe 2, J Malone 2, C Keaney 2, C Boland 2, F Whitley 1, F McGibb 1, R McBride 1	Report	Pts: J Bergin 4 (4f), D Currams 2, P Murphy 2, S Dooley 2 (2f), J Gorman 1, E Cahill 1, K Dunne 1	Referee: Colm Lyons (Cork); Attendance: ~6,000

=== Round 5 ===
9 June 2018 Round 5	Kilkenny	0-22 (22) – (21) 1-18	Wexford	Kilkenny
19:00		(HT: 0-7 – 1-11)		Venue: Nowlan Park
	Pts: TJ Reid 11 (9f, 1 '65'), J Donnelly 2, R Leahy 2, W Walsh 1, J Holden 1, E Morrissey 1, P Walsh 1, C Fogarty 1, J Maher 1, E Murphy 1 (f)	Report	Gls: P Morris 1 Pts: R O'Connor 5 (2f), P Foley 5 (4f), L Chin 3, C McDonald 2, K Foley 1, D O'Keeffe 1, P Morris 1	Referee: James McGrath (Westmeath); Attendance: 17,516; TV: Sky Sports

9 June 2018 Round 5	Galway	0-26 (26) – (25) 2-19	Dublin	Salthill
19:00		(HT: 0-16 – 0-9)		Venue: Pearse Stadium
	Pts: J Flynn 11 (9f), J Cooney 3, C Whelan 3, P Mannion 3, C Cooney 2, David Burke 2, S Loftus 1, C Mannion 1	Report	Gls: P Winter 2 Pts: D Treacy 4 (3f), R McBride 4 (1 sl), P Ryan 3 (3f), A Nolan 2 (2f), D Sutcliffe 1, J Malone 1, S Moran 1, J Madden 1, C Boland 1, P Winters 1	Referee: Diarmuid Kirwan (Cork); Attendance: 9,957

== Final ==
The winning team advanced to the All-Ireland SHC semi-finals, while the losing advanced to the All-Ireland SHC quarter-finals.

RTÉ

1 July 2018
16:00
Leinster Final

Report

Galway	0-18 (18) – (18) 0-18	Kilkenny
(HT: 0-7 – 0-8)
Pts: J Canning 6, N Burke 4, C Whelan 3, C Mannion 3, C Cooney 1, J Cooney 1		Pts: TJ Reid 10, B Ryan 2, E Murphy 1 (f), E Morrissey 1, J Maher 1, G Aylward 1, J Donnelly 1, W Walsh 1

Croke Park, Dublin
Referee: Fergal Horgan (Tipperary)
Attendance: 40,703

== Final replay ==
RTÉ

8 July 2018
15:00
Leinster Final Replay

Report

Galway	1-28 (31) – (24) 3-15	Kilkenny
(HT: 1-16 – 1-7)
Gls: J Glynn 1 Pts: J Canning 10 (6f), C Mannion 6, C Whelan 4, N Burke 2, A Harte 2, J Cooney 1, J Glynn 1, C Cooney 1, J Flynn 1		Gls: G Aylward 1, R Hogan 1, C Fennelly 1 Pts: TJ Reid 9 (6f, 1 '65'), J Holden 1, C Fogarty 1, J Maher 1, J Donnelly 1, R Hogan 1, C Fennelly 1

Semple Stadium, Thurles
Referee: James Owens (Wexford)
Attendance: 25,102

== See also ==
- 2018 All-Ireland Senior Hurling Championship
  - 2018 Munster Senior Hurling Championship
  - 2018 Joe McDonagh Cup
