= 2018 Leinster Senior Hurling Championship final =

2018 Leinster Senior Hurling final (Replay)
- Event: 2018 Leinster Senior Hurling Championship
Kilkenny	Galway
3-15	1-28
- Date: 8 July 2018
- Venue: Semple Stadium, Thurles
- Man of the Match: Cathal Mannion (replay)
- Referee: James Owens (Wexford)
- Attendance: 25,102
- Weather: Sunny

The 2018 Leinster Senior Hurling Championship final, the deciding game of the 2018 Leinster Senior Hurling Championship, was a hurling match played on 1 July 2018 at Croke Park, Dublin. It was contested by Kilkenny and defending champions Galway. The first game ended in a draw with Galway winning the replay a week later. The Galway captain was David Burke and Cathal Mannion was named as the man of the match for the replay.

== Build-Up ==
Tickets for the final went on sale on 15 June and ranged in price from €35 to €40 in the stand and €25 in hill 16.

The drawn match and replay were shown live on RTÉ One as part of The Sunday Game Live.

The final of the 2018 Joe McDonagh Cup took place before the drawn final at Croke Park and was won by Carlow.

== Match details ==
1 July 2018; 4:00 pm Leinster Final	Galway	0-18 - 0-18	Kilkenny	Croke Park; Attendance: 40,703; Referee: Fergal Horgan (Tipperary)
1 July 2018; 4:00 pm Leinster Final	Joe Canning 0-6 (0-4f, 1 '65), Niall Burke 0-4, Cathal Mannion 0-3, Joseph Cooney and Conor Whelan 0-2 each, Conor Cooney 0-1	Report	TJ Reid 0-10 (0-8f), Billy Ryan 0-2, Eoin Murphy (0-1f), Enda Morrissey, James Maher, Walter Walsh, Ger Aylward, John Donnelly 0-1 each	Croke Park; Attendance: 40,703; Referee: Fergal Horgan (Tipperary)

RTÉ

8 July 2018
3:00 pm
Leinster Final Replay

Report

Galway	1-28 (31) – (24) 3-15	Kilkenny
(HT: 1-16 - 1-07)
Gls: J Glynn 1 Pts: J Canning 10 (6f), C Mannion 6, C Whelan 4, N Burke 2, A Harte 2, J Cooney 1, J Glynn 1, C Cooney 1, J Flynn 1		Gls: G Aylward 1, R Hogan 1, C Fennelly 1 Pts: TJ Reid 9 (6f, 1 '65'), J Holden 1, C Fogarty 1, J Maher 1, J Donnelly 1, R Hogan 1, C Fennelly 1

Semple Stadium, Thurles
Referee: James Owens (Wexford)
Attendance: 25,102
