= 2019 Munster Senior Hurling Championship final =

- Event: 2019 Munster Senior Hurling Championship
Tipperary	Limerick
2–14	2–26
- Date: 30 June 2019
- Venue: Gaelic Grounds, Limerick
- Man of the Match: Peter Casey
- Referee: Paud O'Dwyer (Carlow)
- Attendance: 44,052
- Weather: Dry

The 2019 Munster Senior Hurling Championship final was a hurling match that was played on 30 June at the Gaelic Grounds in Limerick. It was contested by Tipperary and Limerick. Limerick won the game on a 2-26 to 2-14 scoreline to win their 20th Munster title.

== Build-Up ==
Tickets for the final went on sale on 19 June and ranged in price from €35 to €40 in the stand and €25 to €30 in the terrace. Terrace tickets sold out on the first day.

The final was the first final between the sides at the Gaelic Grounds since 1996, which ended in a draw before Limerick won the replay in Páirc Uí Chaoimh.

Before the senior final, the Munster minor hurling final between Limerick and Clare took place at 11.30am, with Limerick winning the game by 1-17 to 1-11.

The match was televised live on RTÉ2 as part of The Sunday Game, presented by Joanne Cantwell, with analysis by Anthony Daly, Donal Óg Cusack and Henry Shefflin. Commentary on the game was provided by Ger Canning alongside Michael Duignan.

== Match ==
=== Summary ===
Playing with the wind in the first half, Séamus Callanan scored a goal for Tipperary in the 18th minute when he ran in on goal after a pass from Noel McGrath to shoot low to the left corner of the net, this put Tipperary into a 1-6 to 0-4 lead. Peter Casey got a goal for Limerick in the 26th minute, flicking to the net after a pass from the left by Aaron Gillane. Limerick had a 1-11 to 1-9 lead at half-time. Tipperary's second goal came from John McGrath in the 44th minute when he got free to shoot to the right of the net. Kyle Hayes got a second goal for Limerick in the 55th minute running in on goal to flick to the net to put them six points in front.

=== Details ===
RTÉ

30 June 2019
14:00
Munster final

Report

Limerick	2–26 (32) – (20) 2–14	Tipperary
(HT: 1–11 - 1–9)
Gls: P Casey 1, K Hayes 1. Pts: P Casey 5, T Morrissey 4, A Gillane (3f) 4, G Hegarty 3, D Byrnes (3f) 3, K Hayes 2, G Mulcahy 2, B Nash 1.		Gls: S Callanan 1, J McGrath 1. Pts: J Forde 6 (3f), R Maher 2, N McGrath (1f) 1, S Callanan 1, D McCormack 1, J O’Dwyer 1, J Morris 1, J Cahill 1.

LIT Gaelic Grounds, Limerick
Referee: P O'Dwyer (Carlow)
Attendance: 44,052

== See also ==
- Limerick–Tipperary hurling rivalry
