= 2018 All-Ireland Senior Hurling Championship =

Championship details
- Dates: 12 May – 19 August 2018
- Teams: 12

All-Ireland champions
- Winning team: Limerick (8th win)
- Captain: Declan Hannon
- Manager: John Kiely

All-Ireland Finalists
- Losing team: Galway
- Captain: David Burke
- Manager: Micheál Donoghue

Provincial champions
- Munster: Cork
- Leinster: Galway
- Ulster: Not Played
- Connacht: Not Played

Championship statistics
- No. matches played: 27
- Top Scorer: Peter Duggan (3–76)
- Player of the Year: Cian Lynch
- All-Star Team: See here

The 2018 All-Ireland Senior Hurling Championship (SHC) was the 131st staging of the All-Ireland Senior Hurling Championship since its establishment by the Gaelic Athletic Association in 1887. It is the first tier of senior inter-county championship hurling.

The competition began on 12 May 2018 and ended on 19 August 2018. The draw for the championship round-robin fixtures was held off camera on 19 October 2017 and announced on the championship draw broadcast on RTÉ2. The 2018 championship saw the biggest change in format since the introduction of the qualifiers in 2002.

The competition was won by Limerick, who were crowned champions after overcoming Galway in the final by a scoreline of 3–16 to 2–18. It was Limerick's eighth title and a first since 1973.

The 2018 Championship has been described by many as one of the best ever.

== New format ==
A new provincial hurling championship featuring five-team round-robin groups in both Leinster and Munster and the new Joe McDonagh Cup was introduced in 2018 for an initial three-year period. The proposal was carried by a narrow margin with 62% voting in favour (a majority of at least 60% was required) at the GAA's Special Congress on 30 September 2017. The top two teams in each provincial group would contest the provincial final, with the provincial winners advancing to the All-Ireland semi-finals and the losing provincial finalists advancing to the two quarter-finals.

An amendment to the motion from Laois, Offaly and Meath was carried by 87%. The third-placed teams in Leinster and Munster would compete in All-Ireland preliminary quarter-finals against the two Joe McDonagh Cup finalists, with the Joe McDonagh Cup teams having home advantage.

If a non-Munster team were to win the Joe McDonagh Cup, the bottom team in the Leinster championship would be relegated to the following year's Joe McDonagh Cup and would be replaced in the following year's Leinster championship by the Joe McDonagh Cup winners. If a Munster team were to win the Joe McDonagh Cup, they would play off against the team who finished bottom in the Munster championship for the right to play in the following year's Munster championship, thereby ensuring that only Munster teams compete in the Munster championship.

The restructure of hurling involved the reduction of the Leinster championship from nine teams to five while the Munster championship continued with the previous five Munster teams (Kerry previously competed in the qualifier group of the Leinster championship). A six-team Joe McDonagh Cup was created, consisting of all four teams from the 2017 Leinster qualifier group plus Antrim and Carlow, the 2017 Christy Ring Cup finalists.

=== Leinster Championship ===
Participating counties (5): Dublin, Galway, Kilkenny, Offaly, Wexford

Group stage (10 matches): Each team plays each other once. The 1st and 2nd placed teams advance to the Leinster final and the 3rd placed team advances to the all-Ireland preliminary quarter-finals. All other teams are eliminated from the championship and the bottom placed team may face relegation to next years Joe McDonagh Cup.

Final (1 match): The top 2 teams in the group stage contest this game. The Leinster champions advance to the All-Ireland semi-finals and the Leinster runners-up advance to the All-Ireland quarter-finals.

=== Munster Championship ===
Participating counties (5): Clare, Cork, Limerick, Tipperary, Waterford

Group stage (10 matches): Each team plays each other once. The 1st and 2nd placed teams advance to the Munster final and the 3rd placed team advances to the all-Ireland preliminary quarter-finals. All other teams are eliminated from the championship and the bottom placed team may face relegation to next years Joe McDonagh Cup.

Final (1 match): The top 2 teams in the group stage contest this game. The Munster champions advance to the All-Ireland semi-finals and the Munster runners-up advance to the All-Ireland quarter-finals.

=== Joe McDonagh Cup ===
Participating counties (6): Antrim, Carlow, Kerry, Laois, Meath, Westmeath

Group stage (15 matches): Each team plays each other once. The 1st and 2nd placed teams advance to the Joe McDonagh Cup final. All other teams are eliminated from the championship and the bottom placed team are relegated to next years Christy Ring Cup.

Final (1 match): The top 2 teams in the group stage contest this game. The Joe McDonagh Cup champions and runners-up advance to the All-Ireland preliminary quarter-finals.

=== All-Ireland Championship ===
Preliminary quarter-finals (2 matches): The 3rd placed teams from the 2018 Leinster and Munster championships played the Joe McDonagh Cup champions and runners-up. Two teams were eliminated at this stage while the winners advance to the quarter-finals.

Quarter-finals (2 matches): The winners of the preliminary quarter-finals join the Leinster and Munster runners-up to make up the quarter-final pairings. Teams who may have already met in the provincial championships are kept apart in separate quarter-finals. Two teams are eliminated at this stage while the winners advance to the semi-finals.

Semi-finals (2 matches): The winners of the quarter-finals join the Leinster and Munster champions to make up the semi-final pairings. Teams who may have already met in the provincial championships are kept apart in separate semi-finals where possible. Two teams are eliminated at this stage while the winners advance to the final.

Final (1 match): The two winners of the semi-finals contest this game.

== Team changes ==
=== To Championship ===
Promoted from the Christy Ring Cup

- Antrim
- Carlow

=== From Championship ===
Relegated to the Christy Ring Cup

- None

== Teams ==
=== General information ===
Sixteen counties competed in the All-Ireland Senior Hurling Championship: five teams in the Leinster Senior Hurling Championship, five teams in the Munster Senior Hurling Championship and six teams in the Joe McDonagh Cup.

County	Last provincial title	Last championship title	Position in 2017 championship	Current championship
Antrim	2017	—	Runners-up (Christy Ring Cup)	Joe McDonagh Cup
Carlow	—	—	Preliminary round	Joe McDonagh Cup
Clare	1998	2013	Quarter-finals	Munster Senior Hurling Championship
Cork	2017	2005	Semi-finals	Munster Senior Hurling Championship
Dublin	2013	1938	Round 2	Leinster Senior Hurling Championship
Galway	2017	2017	Champions	Leinster Senior Hurling Championship
Kerry	1891	1891	Group Stage (Leinster Senior Hurling Championship)	Joe McDonagh Cup
Kilkenny	2016	2015	Round 2	Leinster Senior Hurling Championship
Laois	1949	1915	Round 1	Joe McDonagh Cup
Limerick	2013	1973	Round 1	Munster Senior Hurling Championship
Meath	—	—	Group Stage (Leinster Senior Hurling Championship)	Joe McDonagh Cup
Offaly	1995	1998	Round 1	Leinster Senior Hurling Championship
Tipperary	2016	2016	Semi-finals	Munster Senior Hurling Championship
Waterford	2010	1959	Runners-up	Munster Senior Hurling Championship
Westmeath	—	—	Round 1	Joe McDonagh Cup
Wexford	2004	1996	Quarter-finals	Leinster Senior Hurling Championship

=== Personnel and colours ===
County	Manager(s)	Captain(s)	Sponsor
Clare	Donal Moloney; Gerry O'Connor	Patrick O'Connor	Pat O'Donnell
Cork	John Meyler	Séamus Harnedy	Chill Insurance
Dublin	Pat Gilroy	Liam Rushe	AIG
Galway	Micheál Donoghue	David Burke	Supermac's
Kilkenny	Brian Cody	Cillian Buckley	Glanbia
Limerick	John Kiely	Declan Hannon	Sporting Limerick
Offaly	Kevin Martin	David King	Carroll Cuisine
Tipperary	Michael Ryan	Pádraic Maher	Intersport/Elverys
Waterford	Derek McGrath		TQS Integration
Wexford	Davy Fitzgerald	Lee Chin; Matthew O'Hanlon	Gain

== Summary ==
=== Championships ===
Level on Pyramid	Competition	Champions	Runners up
Tier 1	2018 All-Ireland Senior Hurling Championship	Limerick	Galway
Tier 1 (Leinster)	2018 Leinster Senior Hurling Championship	Galway	Kilkenny
Tier 1 (Munster)	2018 Munster Senior Hurling Championship	Cork	Clare
Tier 2	2018 Joe McDonagh Cup	Carlow	Westmeath
Tier 3	2018 Christy Ring Cup	Kildare	London
Tier 4	2018 Nicky Rackard Cup	Donegal	Warwickshire
Tier 5	2018 Lory Meagher Cup	Sligo	Lancashire

== Provincial championships ==
=== Leinster Senior Hurling Championship ===
==== Group Stage ====
Pos	Team	Pld	W	D	L	SF	SA	Diff	Pts	Qualification
1	Galway	4	4	0	0	7–89 (110)	6–62 (80)	+30	8	Advance to Leinster Final
2	Kilkenny	4	3	0	1	5–76 (91)	6–69 (87)	+4	6	Advance to Leinster Final
3	Wexford	4	2	0	2	6–81 (99)	5–68 (83)	+16	4	Advance to All-Ireland Preliminary Quarter-Finals
4	Dublin	4	1	0	3	9–73 (100)	1–85 (88)	+12	2	
5	Offaly	4	0	0	4	5–50 (65)	14–85 (127)	−62	0	Relegated to Joe McDonagh Cup

==== Finals ====
RTÉ

1 July 2018
16:00
Leinster Final

Report

Galway	0–18 (18) – (18) 0–18	Kilkenny
(HT: 0–7 – 0–8)
Pts: J Canning 6, N Burke 4, C Whelan 3, C Mannion 3, C Cooney 1, J Cooney 1		Pts: TJ Reid 10, B Ryan 2, E Murphy 1 (f), E Morrissey 1, J Maher 1, G Aylward 1, J Donnelly 1, W Walsh 1

Croke Park, Dublin
Referee: Fergal Horgan (Tipperary)
Attendance: 40,703

RTÉ

8 July 2018
15:00
Leinster Final Replay

Report

Galway	1–28 (31) – (24) 3–15	Kilkenny
(HT: 1–16 – 1–7)
Gls: J Glynn 1 Pts: J Canning 10 (6f), C Mannion 6, C Whelan 4, N Burke 2, A Harte 2, J Cooney 1, J Glynn 1, C Cooney 1, J Flynn 1		Gls: G Aylward 1, R Hogan 1, C Fennelly 1 Pts: TJ Reid 9 (6f, 1 '65'), J Holden 1, C Fogarty 1, J Maher 1, J Donnelly 1, R Hogan 1, C Fennelly 1

Semple Stadium, Thurles
Referee: James Owens (Wexford)
Attendance: 25,102

=== Munster Senior Hurling Championship ===
==== Group Stage ====
Pos	Team	Pld	W	D	L	SF	SA	Diff	Pts	Qualification
1	Cork	4	2	2	0	5–94 (109)	4–89 (101)	+8	6	Advance to Munster Final
2	Clare	4	3	0	1	4–97 (109)	5–77 (92)	+17	6	Advance to Munster Final
3	Limerick	4	2	1	1	3–92 (101)	4–81 (93)	+8	5	Advance to All-Ireland Preliminary Quarter-Finals
4	Tipperary	4	0	2	2	7–77 (98)	5–91 (106)	−8	2	
5	Waterford	4	0	1	3	6–76 (94)	7–98 (119)	−25	1	

==== Final ====
RTÉ

1 July 2018
14:00
Munster Final

Report

Cork	2–24 (30) – (28) 3–19	Clare
(HT: 1–10 – 2–11)
Gls: S Harnedy 1, L Meade 1 Pts: P Horgan 11 (6f, 1 '65'), S Harnedy 4, M Coleman 2 (1 sl), D Fitzgibbon 2, D Kearney 2, C Lehane 1, L Meade 1, B Cooper 1		Gls: P Duggan 1, D Reidy 1, I Galvin 1 Pts: P Duggan 7 (6f), J Conlon 5, D Reidy 2, P Collins 2, C McGrath 1, T Kelly 1, C Galvin 1

Semple Stadium, Thurles
Referee: J McGrath (Westmeath)
Attendance: 45,364

== Cup competitions ==
=== Joe McDonagh Cup ===
The inaugural Joe McDonagh Cup, the second tier of senior inter-county championship hurling, was contested by Antrim, Carlow, Kerry, Laois, Meath and Westmeath. Each team played all the other teams once in a round-robin format, with the top two teams progressing to the Joe McDonagh Cup final and also advancing to the All-Ireland preliminary quarter-finals, where they played the teams that finished third in the Leinster and Munster championships. Westmeath confirmed their place in the Joe McDonagh Cup final on 2 June 2018 after winning their first four matches, with Carlow confirming their place on 9 June after beating Westmeath.

==== Group Stage ====
Pos	Team	Pld	W	D	L	SF	SA	Diff	Pts	Qualification
1	Carlow	5	4	0	1	122	102	20	8	Advance to Knockout Stage and All-Ireland Preliminary Quarter-Finals
2	Westmeath	5	4	0	1	130	115	15	8	Advance to Knockout Stage and All-Ireland Preliminary Quarter-Finals
3	Kerry	5	3	0	2	105	97	8	6	
4	Laois	5	2	0	3	118	123	−5	4	
5	Antrim	5	2	0	3	130	116	14	4	Advance to Relegation Playoff
6	Meath	5	0	0	5	94	146	−52	0	Relegated to Christy Ring Cup

The top two teams at the end of the round-robin, Westmeath and Carlow, faced each other in the final on 1 July 2018. The game, which took place in Croke Park, saw Carlow emerge victorious by a margin of five points to claim the inaugural Joe McDonagh Cup title.

==== Final ====
1 July 2018
13:45
Joe McDonagh Cup Final

Report

Westmeath	1–24 (27) – (32) 2–26	Carlow
(HT: 0–13 – 1–12)
Gls: N O'Brien 1 Pts: A Devine 8 (8f), E Price 6, A Clarke 3, R Greville 2, D McNicholas 2 (1f), N O'Brien 1, D Clinton 1, N Mitchell 1		Gls: J Doyle 1, C Nolan 1 Pts: D Murphy 10 (9f, 1 '65'), C Nolan 4, P Coady 4, JM Nolan 3, E Byrne 2, J Doyle 1, K McDonald 1, D Byrne 1

Croke Park, Dublin
Referee: Cathal McAllister (Cork)

Carlow were automatically promoted to the Leinster Senior Hurling Championship for 2019, replacing Offaly.

=== Christy Ring Cup ===
==== Group 1 ====
Pos	Team	Pld	W	D	L	SF	SA	Diff	Pts	Qualification
1	Kildare	3	3	0	0	89	58	31	6	Advance to Knockout Stage
2	Wicklow	3	2	0	1	72	64	8	4	Advance to Knockout Stage
3	Roscommon	3	1	0	2	48	71	−22	2	
4	Mayo	3	0	0	3	46	63	−17	0	Relegation to Nicky Rackard Cup

==== Group 2 ====
Pos	Team	Pld	W	D	L	SF	SA	Diff	Pts	Qualification
1	London	3	2	0	1	88	60	28	4	Advance to Knockout Stage
2	Derry	3	2	0	1	89	65	24	4	Advance to Knockout Stage
3	Down	3	2	0	1	92	69	23	4	
4	Armagh	3	0	0	3	39	114	−75	0	Relegation to Nicky Rackard Cup

==== Knockout stage ====
Semi-Finals
London	2–28
Wicklow	2–14
Kildare	3–18
Derry	2–13

Final
London	1–11
Kildare	3–19

=== Nicky Rackard Cup ===
==== Group 1 ====
Pos	Team	Pld	W	D	L	SF	SA	Diff	Pts	Qualification
1	Warwickshire	3	3	0	0	68	52	+16	6	Advance to knockout stage
2	Monaghan	3	1	1	1	69	58	+11	3	Advance to knockout stage
3	Longford	3	1	0	2	48	59	−11	2	
4	Louth	3	0	1	2	49	65	−16	1	Advance to relegation playoff

==== Group 2 ====
Pos	Team	Pld	W	D	L	SF	SA	Diff	Pts	Qualification
1	Donegal	2	2	0	0	63	29	+34	4	Advance to knockout stage
2	Tyrone	2	1	0	1	46	49	−3	2	Advance to knockout stage
3	Leitrim	2	0	0	2	34	65	−31	0	Advance to relegation playoff

==== Knockout stage ====
Semi-Finals
Warwickshire	1–25
Tyrone	1–14
Donegal	4–22
Monaghan	1–10

Final
Warwickshire	0–18
Donegal	2–19

=== Lory Meagher Cup ===
==== Group stage ====
Pos	Team	Pld	W	D	L	SF	SA	Diff	Pts	Qualification
1	Lancashire	3	2	0	1	4–62	7–33	+20	4	Advance to Final
2	Sligo	3	2	0	1	4–49	7–47	−7	4	Advance to Final
3	Cavan	3	1	1	1	8–40	3–58	−3	3	
4	Fermanagh	3	0	1	2	2–42	3–55	−17	1	

==== Final ====
23 June 2018 Final	Sligo	4–15 – 2–20	Lancashire

== Bracket ==
Preliminary Quarter-Finals
Westmeath	0–16
Wexford	2–21
Limerick	5–22
Carlow	0–13

Quarter-Finals
Clare	0–27
Wexford	1–17
Limerick	0–27
Kilkenny	1–22

Semi-Finals
Clare (R)	1–30; 2–13
Galway (R)	1–30; 1–17
Cork	2–31
Limerick	3–32

All-Ireland Final
Galway	2–18
Limerick	3–16

=== Preliminary quarter-finals ===
The preliminary quarter-finals saw the third-placed teams from the two provincial round-robins play the two teams who competed in the Joe McDonagh Cup Final, with the two finalists having home advantage. Joe McDonagh champion Carlow faced third-placed Munster team Limerick at Dr Cullen Park, while runners-up Westmeath met Wexford, the third-place finished from Leinster, at Mullingar's Cusack Park.

7 July 2018 Preliminary quarter-final	Carlow	0–13 (13) – (37) 5–22	Limerick	Carlow
19:00		(HT: 0–4 – 3–9)		Venue: Dr Cullen Park
	Pts: D Murphy 4 (3f, 1 '65'), P Abbey 2, JM Nolan 2, J Kavanagh 1, D Byrne 1, E Byrne 1, C Nolan 1, S Murphy 1	Report	Gls: D Byrnes 1, K Hayes 1, A Gillane 1, G Mulcahy 1, P Casey 1 Pts: A Gillane 6 (2f), T Morrissey 5, P Casey 3, G Hegarty 2, D Byrnes 1 (1 '65'), C Lynch 1, S Flanagan 1, G Mulcahy 1, B Nash 1, D O'Donovan 1	Referee: John Keenan (Wicklow); Attendance: ~6,000

7 July 2018 Preliminary quarter-final	Westmeath	0–16 (16) – (27) 2–21	Wexford	Mullingar
19:00		(HT: 0–8 – 1–12)		Venue: Cusack Park
	Pts: A Devine 8 (7f), A Clarke 2, E Price 2, D McNicholas 1, C Doyle 1, C Boyle 1, J Boyle 1	Report	Gls: D Dunne 1, C McDonald 1 Pts: L Chin 7 (6f, 1 '65'), A Nolan 4, H Kehoe 2, L Ryan 1, D O'Keefe 1, S Murphy 1, J O'Connor 1, P Morris 1, D Dunne 1, C McDonald 1, S Tompkins 1	Referee: Diarmuid Kirwan (Cork)

=== Quarter-finals ===
The two quarter-finals saw the losing provincial finalists play the winners of the two preliminary quarter-finals. As both third-place finishers from the provincial series won in the previous round, they were kept apart from the teams they had already met in the round-robin phase to prevent a repeat fixture. Munster runners-up Clare met Wexford, with beaten Leinster finalists Kilkenny facing Limerick the following day. Both games were held at neutral venues.

14 July 2018 Quarter-final	Clare	0–27 (27) – (20) 1–17	Wexford	Cork
15:00		(HT: 0–16 – 0–9)		Venue: Páirc Uí Chaoimh
	Pts: P Duggan 7 (5f), T Kelly 5, S O'Donnell 4, J Conlon 3, D Reidy 2, P Collins 2, S Morey 1, C Malone 1, C McGrath 1, I Galvin 1	Report	Gls: C McDonald 1 Pts: R O'Connor 10 (9f), C McDonald 3, D Reck 1, S Murphy 1, L Chin 1, D O'Keeffe 1	Referee: Fergal Horgan (Tipperary); Attendance: 10,255; TV: RTÉ

15 July 2018 Quarter-final	Kilkenny	1–22 (25) – (27) 0–27	Limerick	Thurles
14:00		(HT: 0–12 – 0–15)		Venue: Semple Stadium
	Gls: R Hogan 1 Pts: TJ Reid 7 (5f) (1 65), R Leahy 4, R Hogan 3, J Maher 3, C Fennelly 2, C Fogarty 1, L Blanchfield 1, J Donnolly 1	Report	Pts: A Gillane 5 (2f), T Morrissey 4, K Hayes 3, G Mulcahy 3, D O'Donnovan 3 (1 sl), G Hegarty 3, P Casey 2, S Flanagan 1, D Byrnes 1, D Hannon 1, S Dowling 1	Referee: J McGrath (Westmeath); Attendance: 18,596; TV: RTÉ

== Semi-finals ==
The semi-finals took place at Croke Park across the last weekend of July, with the Leinster (Galway) and Munster champions (Cork) playing the winners of the two quarter-finals — Clare and Limerick respectively.

RTÉ
Sky Sports

28 July 2018
17:00
Semi-final

Report

Galway	1–30 (33) – (33) 1–30 (a.e.t.)	Clare
(HT: 1–10 – 0–9) (FT: 1–23 – 0–26)
Gls: C Cooney 1 Pts: J Canning 12 (6f, 2 sl), C Mannion 4, David Burke 3, C Whelan 3, J Flynn 3 (1f), J Coen 2, C Cooney 1, J Glynn 1, N Burke 1		Gls: A Shanagher 1 Pts: P Duggan 14 (11f), J Conlon 4, S O'Donnell 3, T Kelly 3 (1 sl), I Galvin 2, D Fitzgerald 1, D Reidy 1, J McCarthy 1, C Galvin 1

Croke Park, Dublin
Referee: James Owens (Wexford)
Attendance: 54,191

RTÉ
Sky Sports

29 July 2018
15:30
Semi-final

Report

Cork	2–31 (37) – (41) 3–32 (a.e.t.)	Limerick
(HT: 0–14 – 1–12) (FT: 1–27 – 1–27)
Gls: P Horgan 1 (1f), C Lehane 1 Pts: P Horgan 0–11 (9f), D Fitzgibbon 4, C Lehane 3, D Kearney 3, S Kingston 3, S Harnedy 2, M Coleman 2 (1 sideline), C Joyce 1, L Meade 1, J O'Connor 1		Gls: S Dowling 1 (1p), C Lynch 1, P Ryan 1 Pts: A Gillane 13 (7f), S Dowling 4 (1f), G Mulcahy 4, G Hegarty 3, C Lynch 1, D O'Donovan 1, D Byrnes 1(1f), S Flanagan 1, T Morrissey 1, K Hayes 1, B Nash 1, D Reidy 1

Croke Park, Dublin
Referee: Paud O'Dwyer (Carlow)
Attendance: 71,073

RTÉ
Sky Sports

5 August 2018
14:00
Semi-final Replay

Report

Clare	2–13 (19) – (20) 1–17	Galway
(HT: 0–6 – 1–9)
Gls: P Duggan 1, S O'Donnell 1 Pts: P Duggan 6 (6f), I Galvin 2, T Kelly, P Collins 1, J Conlon 1, A Shanagher 1, S O'Donnell 1		Gls: J Glynn 1 Pts: J Canning 8 (4f, 1 sl), C Whelan 3, N Burke 2, D Burke 2, C Mannion 1, C Cooney 1

Semple Stadium, Thurles
Referee: Fergal Horgan (Tipperary)
Attendance: 44,246

== Final ==
RTÉ
Sky Sports

19 August 2018
15:30
All-Ireland Final

Report

Galway	2–18 (24) – (25) 3–16	Limerick
(HT: 0–9 – 1–10)
Gls: C Whelan 1, J Canning 1 (1f); Pts: J Canning 10 (5f, 2 '65'), D Burke 3, J Cooney 3, P Mannion 1, N Burke 1		Gls: G Mulcahy 1, T Morrissey 1, S Dowling 1 Pts: K Hayes 4, A Gillane 3 (1f), G Mulcahy 2, D Hannon 2, T Morrisey 1, D O'Donovan 1, C Lynch 1, D Byrnes 1

Croke Park, Dublin
Referee: James Owens (Wexford)
Attendance: 82,000

== Stadia and locations ==
=== Teams and venues ===
Each team had a nominal home stadium for the round-robin series of the provincial championships. However, Waterford did not play their "home" games at Walsh Park, instead playing in neutral venues for these fixtures, namely Limerick's Gaelic Grounds and Semple Stadium in Thurles.

In the knockout stage, teams from the provincial round-robin series did not have home advantage, if avoidable. The only teams that played knockout games at home were the two Joe McDonagh Cup finalists, who had home advantage in the preliminary quarter-finals. The Munster final was held at a neutral venue which was decided based on the qualifying teams, while the locations of the two quarter-finals were decided based on similar considerations. The Leinster final, and the semi-finals and final of the All-Ireland series were held in the 82,300-capacity Croke Park in Dublin, headquarters of the GAA.

Team	Location	Stadium	Capacity
From the Leinster Championship
Dublin	Donnycarney	Parnell Park	8,500
Galway	Galway	Pearse Stadium	26,197
Kilkenny	Kilkenny	Nowlan Park	27,800
Offaly	Tullamore	O'Connor Park	20,000
Wexford	Wexford	Wexford Park	25,000
From the Munster Championship
Clare	Ennis	Cusack Park	19,000
Cork	Cork	Páirc Uí Chaoimh	45,000
Limerick	Limerick	Gaelic Grounds	49,886
Tipperary	Thurles	Semple Stadium	53,000
Waterford	N / A		
From the Joe McDonagh Cup
Carlow	Carlow	Dr. Cullen Park	21,000
Westmeath	Mullingar	Cusack Park	11,000

== Statistics ==
=== Top scorers overall ===
Rank	Player	Club	Tally	Total	Matches	Average
1	Peter Duggan	Clare	3–76	85	8	10.60
2	Joe Canning	Galway	2–78	84	8	10.50
3	T. J. Reid	Kilkenny	2–63	69	7	9.85
4	Patrick Horgan	Cork	2–53	61	6	10.17
5	Jason Forde	Tipperary	3–39	48	4	12.00
6	Rory O'Connor	Wexford	0–46	46	5	9.20
7	Aaron Gillane	Limerick	1–37	40	7	5.71
8	Paul Ryan	Dublin	3–21	30	4	7.50
9	Shane Dowling	Limerick	2–24	30	5	6.00
10	Pauric Mahony	Waterford	1–26	29	3	9.66

=== Top scorers in a single game ===
Rank	Player	County	Tally	Total	Opposition
1	Jason Forde	Tipperary	1–14	17	Waterford
2	Joe Canning	Galway	1–12	15	Kilkenny
2	Peter Duggan	Clare	0–15	15	Tipperary
2	Shane Dowling	Limerick	0–15	15	Waterford
5	Peter Duggan	Clare	0–14	14	Galway
6	Patrick Horgan	Cork	1–11	14	Limerick
7	Joe Canning	Galway	1–10	13	Limerick
7	Peter Duggan	Clare	1–10	13	Waterford
7	Peter Duggan	Clare	0–13	13	Limerick
7	Aaron Gillane	Limerick	0–13	13	Cork
11	Jason Forde	Tipperary	1–9	12	Limerick
11	T. J. Reid	Kilkenny	1–9	12	Galway
11	Shane Dooley	Offaly	1–9	12	Galway
11	Rory O'Connor	Wexford	0–12	12	Dublin
11	T. J. Reid	Kilkenny	0–12	12	Dublin
11	Rory O'Connor	Wexford	0–12	12	Galway
11	Joe Canning	Galway	0–12	12	Wexford
11	Joe Canning	Galway	0–12	12	Clare

=== Scoring Events ===
- Widest winning margin: 24 points
  - Offaly 2–9 – 5–24 Wexford (Leinster round-robin)
  - Carlow 0–13 – 5–22 Limerick (All-Ireland preliminary quarter-final)
- Most goals in a match: 7
  - Offaly 2–9 – 5–24 Wexford (Leinster round-robin)
  - Offaly 2–15 – 5–18 Galway (Leinster round-robin)
- Most points in a match: 63
  - Cork 2–31 – 3–32 Limerick (All-Ireland semi-final, after extra time)
- Most goals by one team in a match: 5
  - Offaly 2–9 – 5–24 Wexford (Leinster round-robin)
  - Offaly 2–15 – 5–18 Galway (Leinster round-robin)
  - Carlow 0–13 – 5–22 Limerick (All-Ireland preliminary quarter-final)
- Most goals by a losing team: 3
  - Dublin 3–16 – 1–24 Kilkenny (Leinster round-robin)
  - Cork 2–24 – 3–19 Clare (Munster final)
  - Kilkenny 3–15 – 1–28 Galway (Leinster final, replay)
- Highest aggregate score: 78 points (new all-time record)
  - Cork 2–31 – 3–32 Limerick (All-Ireland semi-final, after extra time)
- Lowest aggregate score: 36 points
  - Kilkenny 0–18 – 0–18 Galway (Leinster final, drawn match)

== Miscellaneous ==
- The Munster round-robin game between Clare and Waterford was the first Munster Championship game to take place at Cusack Park in Ennis since 1997.
- The Leinster round-robin game between Galway and Kilkenny at Pearse Stadium in Salthill was Galway's first home Leinster Championship match. It was the first provincial championship game (excluding the Connacht championship) to take place in County Galway since 1965.
- Clare's defeat of Tipperary in the Munster round-robin game was their first victory over the team since 2003. It is also their first defeat of Tipperary in Thurles since 1928.
- Michael "Brick" Walsh of Waterford set a new record when he made his 74th championship appearance against Cork on 17 June 2018.
- Cork won back-to-back Munster titles for the first time since 2005/06.
- The Leinster final ended in a draw for the first time since 1993.
- The Leinster final was played outside Leinster for the first time.
- For only the second consecutive season, no county from Leinster reached the All-Ireland semi-final stage, with the four spots going to Clare, Cork, Galway and Limerick. (Galway currently played in the Leinster Championship but were geographically in Connacht.)
- Limerick defeated Kilkenny in the championship for the first time since 1973.
- Kilkenny failed to win the All-Ireland for the third consecutive year. This was their longest titleless streak since 1994–1999, when they went six years without an All-Ireland.
- Limerick achieved victory in the All-Ireland final for the first time since 1973.
- Limerick defeated Galway in the All-Ireland final for the very first time.

== Live television coverage ==
RTÉ, the national broadcaster in Ireland, provided the majority of the live television coverage of the hurling championship in the second year of a five-year deal running from 2017 until 2021. Sky Sports also broadcast a number of matches and had exclusive rights to some games.

Live Hurling On TV Schedule
Date	Fixture & Match Details	RTÉ Sky Sports
Provincial Championships
13 May	Dublin v Kilkenny; Leinster Round 1	RTÉ
20 May	Limerick v Tipperary; Munster Round 1	RTÉ
20 May	Cork v Clare; Munster Round 1	RTÉ
27 May	Tipperary v Cork; Munster Round 2	RTÉ
27 May	Galway v Kilkenny; Leinster Round 3	RTÉ
2 June	Wexford v Galway; Leinster Round 4	Sky Sports
2 June	Cork v Limerick; Munster Round 3	Sky Sports
3 June	Waterford v Tipperary; Munster Round 3	RTÉ
9 June	Kilkenny v Wexford; Leinster Round 5	Sky Sports (Note: Sky Sports missed the first 22 minutes of the match because they showed extra time of Meath v Tyrone in the All-Ireland Senior Football Championship instead.)
10 June	Tipperary v Clare; Munster Round 4	RTÉ
17 June	Clare v Limerick; Munster Round 5	RTÉ
1 July	Cork v Clare; Munster Final	RTÉ
1 July	Galway v Kilkenny; Leinster Final	RTÉ
All-Ireland Hurling Championship
14 July	Clare v Wexford; All-Ireland Quarter-Final	RTÉ
15 July	Kilkenny v Limerick; All-Ireland Quarter-Final	RTÉ
28 July	Galway v Clare; All-Ireland Semi-Final	RTÉ; Sky Sports
29 July	Cork v Limerick; All-Ireland Semi-Final	RTÉ; Sky Sports
19 August	Galway v Limerick; All-Ireland Final	RTÉ; Sky Sports

== Awards ==
Sunday Game Team of the Year

The Sunday Game team of the year was picked on 19 August, which was the night of the final. The panel consisting of Brendan Cummins, Jackie Tyrrell, Anthony Daly, Eddie Brennan, Dónal O'Grady, Ken McGrath and Cyril Farrell unanimously selected Galway's Pádraic Mannion as the Sunday game player of the year.

1. Eoin Murphy (Kilkenny)
2. Sean Finn (Limerick)
3. Daithi Burke (Galway)
4. Richie English (Limerick)
5. Diarmaid Byrnes (Limerick)
6. Declan Hannon (Limerick)
7. Padraic Mannion (Galway)
8. Darragh Fitzgibbon (Cork)
9. Cian Lynch (Limerick)
10. Peter Duggan (Clare)
11. Joe Canning (Galway)
12. Tom Morrissey (Limerick)
13. Graeme Mulcahy (Limerick)
14. John Conlon (Clare)
15. Seamus Harnedy (Cork)

All Star Team of the Year

On 2 November, the 2018 PwC All-Stars winners were announced and presented at Dublin's Convention Centre. Cian Lynch was named as the All Stars Hurler of the Year with Kyle Hayes named the All Stars Young Hurler of the Year.

Pos.	Player	Team	Appearances
GK	Eoin Murphy	Kilkenny	2
RCB	Seán Finn	Limerick	1
FB	Daithí Burke	Galway	4
LCB	Richie English	Limerick	1
RWB	Pádraic Mannion	Galway	2
CB	Declan Hannon	Limerick	1
LWB	Dan Morrissey	Limerick	1
MD	Cian Lynch^{HOTY}	Limerick	1
MD	Darragh Fitzgibbon	Cork	1
RWF	Peter Duggan	Clare	1
CF	Joe Canning	Galway	5
LWF	Séamus Harnedy	Cork	2
RCF	Patrick Horgan	Cork	3
FF	John Conlon	Clare	1
LCF	Graeme Mulcahy	Limerick	1

== See also ==
- 2018 Leinster Senior Hurling Championship
- 2018 Munster Senior Hurling Championship
- 2018 Joe McDonagh Cup (Tier 2)
- 2018 Christy Ring Cup (Tier 3)
- 2018 Nicky Rackard Cup (Tier 4)
- 2018 Lory Meagher Cup (Tier 5)
