= Patrick O'Connor (hurler) =

Irish hurler

Personal information
- Native name: Pádraig Ó Conchubhair (Irish)
- Born: 6 February 1991 (age 35) Tubber, County Clare, Ireland
- Occupation: Agribusiness branch manager
- Height: 5 ft 11 in (180 cm)

Sport
- Sport: Hurling
- Position: Left wing-back
Club
- Years: Club
- 2007-present: Tubber
Club titles
- Clare titles: 0
College
- Years: College
- 2009-2013: Cork Institute of Technology
College titles
- Fitzgibbon titles: 0
Inter-county
Years	County	Apps (scores)
2011-2022	Clare	11 (0-03)
Inter-county titles
- Munster titles: 0
- All-Irelands: 1
- NHL: 1
- All Stars: 0

Patrick O'Connor (born 6 February 1991) is an Irish sportsperson. He plays hurling with his local club Tubber and was a member of the Clare senior inter-county team from 2011 until he retired form inter-county hurling in 2022. He made his Championship debut for Clare against Tipperary in the 2011 Munster Senior Hurling Championship on 19 July 2011.

== Honours ==
Gort Community School

- Connacht Colleges Senior Hurling Championship: 2007, 2008, 2009 (c)

Clare

- All-Ireland Senior Hurling Championship: 2013
- National Hurling League: 2016
- All-Ireland Under-21 Hurling Championship: 2009, 2012
- Munster Under-21 Hurling Championship: 2009, 2012
