= Donal Moloney =

Irish hurler and manager

Donal Moloney (born 1966) is an Irish hurling manager and former player. He was the joint-manager of the Clare senior team with Gerry O'Connor from 2016 until departing after the 2019 championship .

On 4 June 2017, in his first Championship game in charge alongside Gerry O'Connor, Clare defeated Limerick in the Munster Senior Hurling Championship semi-final at Semple Stadium on a 2–16 to 3–17 scoreline.

== Honours ==
=== Manager ===
Clare

- All-Ireland Under-21 Hurling Championship (3): 2012, 2013, 2014
- Munster Under-21 Hurling Championship (3): 2012, 2013, 2014
- Munster Minor Hurling Championship (1): 2010

Sporting positions
Preceded by Davy Fitzgerald	Clare Senior Hurling Joint-Manager; 2016–2019	Succeeded by Brian Lohan
Achievements
Preceded by Anthony Cunningham	All-Ireland Under-21 Hurling Final winning joint-manager 2012-2014	Succeeded by John Kiely
