= Gerry O'Connor (hurling manager) =

Irish hurler and manager

Gerry O'Connor (born 1966) is an Irish hurling manager and former player. He was the joint-manager of the Clare senior team with Donal Moloney from 2016 until departing after the 2019 championship.

On 4 June 2017, in his first Championship game in charge alongside Donal Moloney, Clare defeated Limerick in the Munster Senior Hurling Championship semi-final at Semple Stadium on a 2-16 to 3-17 scoreline.

== Honours ==
=== Manager ===
Clare

- All-Ireland Under-21 Hurling Championship (3): 2012, 2013, 2014
- Munster Under-21 Hurling Championship (3): 2012, 2013, 2014
- Munster Minor Hurling Championship (1): 2010

Sporting positions
Preceded by Davy Fitzgerald	Clare Senior Hurling Joint-Manager; 2016–2019	Succeeded by Brian Lohan
Achievements
Preceded by Anthony Cunningham	All-Ireland Under-21 Hurling Final winning joint-manager 2012-2014	Succeeded by John Kiely
