= Séamus Harnedy =

Irish hurler (born 1990)

Personal information
- Native name: Séamus Ó hAirtnéada (Irish)
- Nickname: Séamie
- Born: 17 July 1990 (age 36) Gortroe, County Cork, Ireland
- Occupation: Secondary school teacher
- Height: 6 ft 1 in (185 cm)

Sport
- Sport: Hurling
- Position: Left wing-forward
Clubs
- Years: Club
- 2007-present 2010; 2015-present 2011-2014: St Ita's → Imokilly → University College Cork
Club titles
- Cork titles: 4
College
- Years: College
- 2009-2014: University College Cork
College titles
- Fitzgibbon titles: 1
Inter-county*
Years	County	Apps (scores)
2011-2026	Cork	62 (9-149)
Inter-county titles
- Munster titles: 4
- All-Irelands: 0
- NHL: 1
- All Stars: 3
- *Inter County team apps and scores correct as of 16:38, 14 July 2025.

Séamus Harnedy (born 17 July 1990) is an Irish hurler. At club level he plays with St Ita's, divisional side Imokilly and previously at inter-county level with the Cork senior hurling team. He usually lines out as a left wing-forward.

== Early life ==
Harnedy was born and raised in the Gortroe area of East Cork. His father, Seán Harnedy, played with the Waterford senior hurling team, while his mother, Cathy Landers, won four All-Ireland SCC medals with the Cork senior camogie team, including one as team captain in 1983.

Harnedy first played hurling to a high standard as a student at Pobalscoil na Tríonóide in Youghal. He progressed through the various age grades, winning a Cork Colleges U16HC medal in 2006, before later playing on the school's Harty Cup team.

Harnedy later studied at University College Cork (UCC) and won an All-Ireland Freshers' HC title in 2010 after a defeat of Cork Institute of Technology (CIT) in the final. He later progressed to UCC's Fitzgibbon Cup team and claimed a winners' medal in that competition after a one-point extra-time defeat of CIT in the 2012 final. Harnedy won a second consecutive Fitzgibbon Cup title when UCC retained the title after a 2–17 to 2–12 defeat of Mary Immaculate College in 2013.

== Club career ==
Harnedy began his club hurling career at juvenile and underage levels with the Killeagh-Ita's amalgamation. He won a Cork MAHC title in 2006 before later lining out for the St Ita's club at adult level. Harnedy won a Cork JBHC medal after a 0–12 to 0–07 defeat of Castlemagner in the 2007 final replay.

Harnedy's performances at club level resulted in him being selected for the Imokilly divisional for the first time in 2010. He spent the following four seasons lining out with University College Cork before returning to the Imokilly team. Harnedy captained Imokilly to their first Cork SHC title in 19 years in October 2017, after scoring 1–01 in the 3–13 to 0–18 defeat of Blackrock in the final.

Harnedy retained the captaincy the following year and won a second consecutive Cork SHC title after top-scoring with 1-06 from play in the 4–19 to 1–18 defeat of Midleton in the final. He once again captained the team in 2019 when Imokilly secured a third successive title after the 2–17 to 1–16 defeat of Glen Rovers in the final. The victory meant that Harned became the first player to captain a team to three successive title since Josa Lee in 1936.

In October 2021, Harnedy top-scored with 0-06 when he captained St Ita's to their first ever East Cork JAHC title after a 1–14 to 1–05 defeat of Erin's Own in the final.

== Inter-county career ==
Harnedy first played for Cork as a member of the under-21 team, having never played for the minor team. He was an unused substitute for the team in his final year of eligibility, which ended with a 4–20 to 1-27 extra-time defeat by Limerick in the 2011 Munster U21 final.

By that stage Harnedy had already been selected for the senior team. He made his debut in January 2011 in a pre-season Waterford Crystal Cup defeat of University College Cork. Harnedy failed to secure a place on the Cork panel for the subsequent 2011 National Hurling League campaign.

After a two-year absence, Harnedy returned to the Cork senior team during the 2013 Waterford Crystal Cup. Debuts in the National Hurling League and Munster SHC followed over the following few months. Harnedy scored three points in the 0–24 to 0–15 defeat by Limerick in the 2013 Munster final. In September 2013, he was at right wing-forward for both the drawn All-Ireland final and subsequent replay defeat by Clare. Harnedy ended the season by being named at right wing-forward on the All-Star team.

In July 2014, Harnedy won his first Munster SHC medal and was selected as man of the match after scoring 1-02 from play in Cork's 2–24 to 0–24 defeat of Limerick in the last Munster final to be played at the old Páirc Uí Chaoimh. He sustained a hamstring injury during Cork's 1–24 to 0–17 defeat by Waterford in the 2015 National League final and was subsequently sidelined for a period.

Harnedy made his third Munster final appearance in July 2017 and claimed his second winners' medal following the 1–25 to 1–20 defeat of Clare. He was appointed captain of the Cork senior hurling team for the 2018 season. Harnedy scored 1-04 from play when he captained the team to a second successive Munster final defeat of Clare in July 2018. He was later named in the left wing-forward position on the All-Star team. Harnedy retained the Cork captaincy for the 2019 season.

In August 2021, Harnedy scored four points from play from centre-forward when Cork suffered a 3–32 to 1–22 defeat by Limerick in the 2021 All-Ireland final. He was at left wing-forward when Cork lost the 2022 National League final to Waterford.

Harnedy won his third All Star at the end of the 2024 season.

In October 2026, Harnedy announced his retirement from inter-county hurling after 15 years with the team.

== Career statistics ==
=== Division ===
As of 21 September 2025

Team	Year	Cork PSHC	
Team	Year	Apps	Score
Imokilly	2010	3	2-13
Imokilly	Total	3	2-13
University College Cork	2011	1	0-03
University College Cork	2012	3	1-11
University College Cork	2013	3	6-07
University College Cork	2014	3	0-12
University College Cork	Total	10	7-33
Imokilly	2015	3	2-08
Imokilly	2016	4	3-19
Imokilly	2017	7	4-20
Imokilly	2018	5	2-12
Imokilly	2019	5	1-17
Imokilly	2020	0	0-00
Imokilly	2021	1	0-02
Imokilly	2022	3	2-05
Imokilly	2023	3	0-07
Imokilly	2024	2	0-05
Imokilly	2025	1	1-02
Imokilly	Total	34	15-97
Career total		47	24-143

=== Inter-county ===
As of 31 January 2026

Team	Year	National League			Munster		All-Ireland		Total	
Team	Year	Division	Apps	Score	Apps	Score	Apps	Score	Apps	Score
Cork	2013	Division 1A	3	0-02	2	0-06	4	1-07	9	1-15
Cork	2014	Division 1B	5	2-11	4	1-06	1	0-01	10	3-18
Cork	2015	Division 1A	4	0-08	0	0-00	3	1-06	7	1-14
Cork	2016	Division 1A	4	5-03	1	0-01	2	0-01	7	5-05
Cork	2017	Division 1A	6	0-08	3	0-06	1	0-01	10	0-15
Cork	2018	Division 1A	5	0-05	5	3-14	1	0-02	11	3-21
Cork	2019	Division 1A	2	1-03	4	1-10	2	0-07	8	2-20
Cork	2020	Division 1A	5	0-04	1	0-03	2	0-09	8	0-16
Cork	2021	Division 1A	2	0-01	1	0-01	4	0-12	7	0-14
Cork	2022	Division 1A	1	0-02	4	0-10	2	1-03	7	1-15
Cork	2023	Division 1A	2	1-03	4	0-12	—		6	1-15
Cork	2024	Division 1A	3	0-04	4	1-10	3	0-10	10	1-24
Cork	2025	Division 1A	3	0-02	4	0-11	1	0-01	8	0-14
Cork	2026	Division 1A	1	0-04	0	0-00	0	0-00	1	0-04
Career total			46	9-60	37	6-90	26	3-60	109	18-220

== Honours ==
Pobalscoil na Tríonóide

- Cork Colleges Under-16 B Hurling Championship: 2006

University College Cork

- Fitzgibbon Cup: 2012, 2013
- All-Ireland Freshers' Hurling Championship: 2010

Killeagh-Ita's

- Cork Minor A Hurling Championship: 2006

Glenbower Rovers

- East Cork Junior A Football Championship: 2011, 2012, 2013, 2014

St Ita's

- East Cork Junior A Hurling Championship: 2021
- Cork Junior B Hurling Championship: 2007
- Cork Minor A Hurling Championship: 2006

Imokilly

- Cork Senior Hurling Championship: 2017 (c), 2018 (c), 2019 (c), 2024
- Denis O'Riordan Cup: 2022, 2023, 2024

Cork

- Munster Senior Hurling Championship: 2014, 2017, 2018 (c), 2025
- National Hurling League: 2025

Awards

- GAA GPA All Stars Awards: 2013, 2018, 2024
- The Sunday Game Team of the Year: 2018, 2024

Sporting positions
Preceded by Stephen McDonnell	Cork senior hurling team captain 2018-2019	Succeeded by Patrick Horgan
