= 2014 National Hurling League =

83rd staging of the National Hurling League

National Hurling League 2014
League details
- Dates: 15 February – 4 May 2014
- Teams: 34

League champions
- Winners: Kilkenny (17th win)
- Captain: Lester Ryan
- Manager: Brian Cody

League runners-up
- Runners-up: Tipperary
- Captain: Brendan Maher
- Manager: Eamon O'Shea

Other division winners
- Division 1B: Cork
- Division 2A: Kerry
- Division 2B: Wicklow
- Division 3A: Donegal
- Division 3B: Tyrone

The 2014 National Hurling League was the 83rd staging of the National Hurling League. The league began on 15 February. The divisional stage of the competition finished on 23 March.

In the final played on 4 May at Semple Stadium, Kilkenny defeated Tipperary by 2-25 1–27 with TJ Reid getting the winning point in the last minute of extra-time. Tipperary had led by 1–11 to 1–9 at half time, the Tipperary goal coming from John O'Dwyer when he connected with Noel McGrath's sideline cut to touch the ball to the net from the edge of the square. The game finished in a draw at 2–17 to 1–20 after 70 minutes with injury time points for Tipperary from Shane Bourke and Kieran Bergin sending the game to extra time. Both goals for Kilkenny came from penalties and both scored by TJ Reid and the sides were level 11 times.

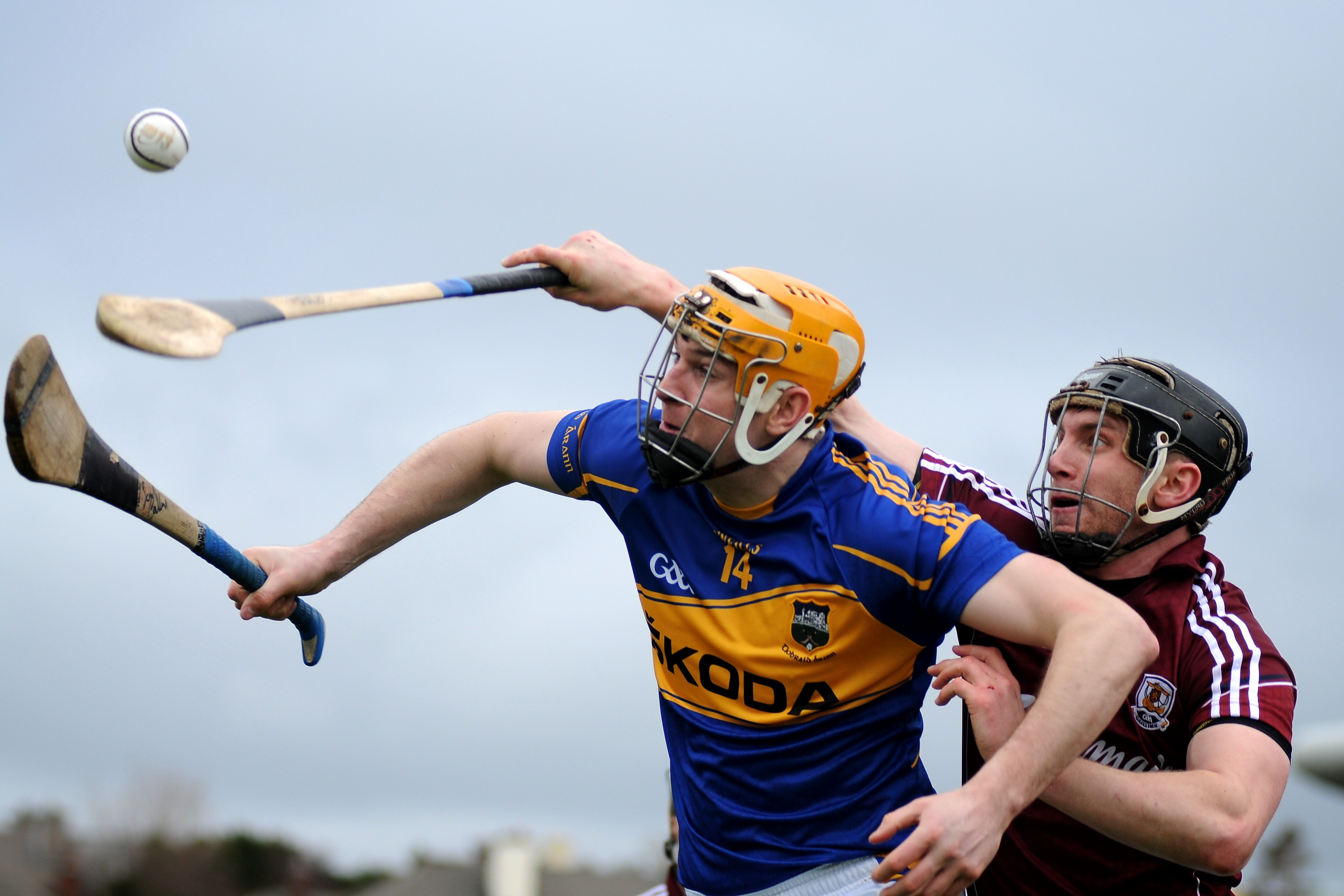
Séamus Callanan of Tipperary and Aidan Harte of Galway in action in the 2014 National Hurling League in Pearse Stadium

== Format ==
- Division 1A: Top four teams qualify for NHL quarter-finals. Bottom two teams play a relegation playoff, with the losing team relegated to Division 1B.
- Division 1B: Top team promoted to 1A. Top four teams qualify for NHL quarter-finals. Bottom two teams play a relegation playoff, with the losing team playing a promotion-relegation match against the Division 2A champions.
- Division 2A: Top two teams play Division 2A final, with the winning team playing a promotion-relegation match against the loser of the Division 1B relegation playoff. Bottom team relegated to Division 2B.
- Division 2B: Top two teams play division final, with the winner being promoted. Bottom two teams play a relegation playoff, with the losing team playing a promotion-relegation match against the Division 3A champions.
- Division 3A: Top two teams play Division 3A final, with the winning team playing a promotion-relegation match against the loser of the Division 2B relegation playoff. Bottom team relegated to Division 3B.
- Division 3B: Top two teams play division final, with the winner being promoted.

== Division 1A ==
=== Division 1A ===
NHL quarter-finals Relegation play-off

| Team | Pld | W | D | L | F | A | Diff | Pts |
|---|---|---|---|---|---|---|---|---|
| Clare | 5 | 3 | 1 | 1 | 10–84 | 3–90 | 15 | 7 |
| Kilkenny (C) | 5 | 3 | 0 | 2 | 14–99 | 8–82 | 25 | 6 |
| Galway | 5 | 2 | 1 | 2 | 6–88 | 4–87 | 7 | 5 |
| Tipperary | 5 | 2 | 0 | 3 | 9–85 | 12–86 | −10 | 4 |
| Dublin | 5 | 2 | 0 | 3 | 5–80 | 5–90 | −10 | 4 |
| Waterford (R) | 5 | 2 | 0 | 3 | 1–85 | 13–76 | −27 | 4 |

- Tipperary and Dublin are separated by total points scored (Tipperary 107, Dublin 95).

==== Fixtures and results ====
| 15 February 2014 Round 1 | Tipperary | 2–13 – 0–16 | Waterford | Semple Stadium |
| 19:00 | S Callanan 1–4 (0-2f), J O'Dwyer 0-4f, D Gleeson 1-0f, N McGrath 0–2, J Woodlock, K Bergin & D Maher 0–1 each. | Report | Pauric Mahony 0–10 (9f), Philip Mahony 0–2, K Moran, J Dillon, M Shanahan & B O'Sullivan 0–1 each | Attendance: 4,786; Referee: C Lyons (Cork) |

| 16 February 2014 Round 1 | Galway | 0–28 – 1–12 | Dublin | Pearse Stadium |
| 14:00 | N Healy (1f), C Cooney (5fs) 0–6 each, C Mannion, J Flynn 0–4 each, J Glynn 0–3, P Brehony 0–2, D Glennon, D Collins, A Harte all 0–1 each | Report | S McGrath 1–1 (0-1f), A McCrabbe 0-4fs, D O'Callaghan 0–3, P Ryan 0-2fs, R O'Dwyer, M Schutte all 0–1 each | Attendance: 4,411; Referee: J Ryan (Tipperary) |

| 16 February 2014 Round 1 | Clare | 1–16 – 0–18 | Kilkenny | Cusack Park |
| 14:00 | Colin Ryan 1–9 (7fs), C McGrath 0–3, J Conlan, P Donnellan, C Galvin, C O'Connell 0–1 each | Report | H Shefflin 0–12 (8fs, 2 '65s), W Walsh, P Walsh 0–2 each, J Farrell, C Fennelly 0–1 each | Attendance: 10,125; Referee: B Gavin (Offaly) |

| 23 February 2014 Round 2 | Kilkenny | 5–20 – 5–14 | Tipperary | Nowlan Park |
| 14:00 | Colin Fennelly 3–5, Henry Shefflin 1–5 (0-5f), Walter Walsh 0–5, Mark Kelly 1–1, Richie Hogan 0–2, Padraig Walsh & TJ Reid 0–1 each. | Report | Séamus Callanan 3–6 (0-3f, 0–2 65s), Noel McGrath 1–3, Jason Forde 1–0, Michael Cahill 0–2, Brendan Maher, James Woodlock & Paddy Murphy 0–1 each. | Attendance: 8,651; Referee: D Kirwan (Cork) |

| 23 February 2014 Round 2 | Waterford | 0–22 – 1–13 | Galway | Walsh Park |
| 14:00 | Pauric Mahony 0–11 (0-6f), Ray Barry 0–4, Seamus Prendergast 0–2, Kevin Moran, Stephen Molumphy, Ryan Donnelly, Stephen Roche 0–1 each. | Report | Conor Cooney 0–6 (0-2f), Cathal Mannion 0–3, Jason Flynn 1–0, Padraig Brehony 0–2, David Burke, Niall Healy 0–1 each. | Referee: J Sexton (Cork) |

| 23 February 2014 Round 2 | Dublin | 2–17 – 0–17 | Clare | Parnell Park |
| 14:00 | Alan McCrabbe 0–9 (0-7f, 0–1 sideline), Conal Keaney 1–3, Colm Cronin 1–1, Shane Durkin 0–2, Johnny McCaffrey, David O'Callaghan 0–1 each | Report | Colin Ryan 0–7 (0-7f), John Conlon 0–3, Bobby Duggan (0-2f), Tony Kelly (0-1f) 0–2 each, Conor McGrath, Patrick O'Connor, Cathal O'Connell 0–1 each. | Referee: A Kelly |

| 9 March 2014 Round 3 | Tipperary | 0–20 – 4–15 | Clare | Semple Stadium |
| 13:15 | J O'Dwyer 0–7 (3fs, 1'65'), J Forde (1f), J Woodlock, C Kenny, S Bourke 0–2 each, N McGrath, P Murphy, K Bergin, M Heffernan, S McGrath 0–1 each. | Report | C McGrath 3–1, J Conlon 1–3, Colin Ryan 0–4 (2fs 1'65'), P Duggan 0–2, C Galvin, P Donnellan, D Honan, T Kelly, S Morey 0–1 each. | Attendance: 8,133; Referee: J Owens (Wexford) |

| 9 March 2014 Round 3 | Kilkenny | 2–16 – 1–16 | Galway | Nowlan Park |
| 14:00 | R Hogan 1–3, TJ Reid 0–6 (4fs), M Kelly 1–0, W Walsh, G Brennan 0–3 each, JJ Farrell 0–1. | Report | C Cooney 1–8 (1–0 pen, 7fs), N Healy, G McInerney 0–3 each, N Burke, P Brehony 0–1 each. | Referee: C Lyons (Cork) |

| 9 March 2014 Round 3 | Waterford | 1–13 – 1–10 | Dublin | Walsh Park |
| 14:30 | Pauric Mahony 1–8 (6fs, 1 '65'), S Prendergast 0–2, B O'Sullivan, R Donnelly, K Moran 0–1 each. | Report | C Keaney 1–1, A McCrabbe 0–3 (2fs, 1 65'), D O'Callaghan 0–2, J McCaffrey, J Boland, C Cronin, E Dillon 0–1 each. | Referee: C McAllister (Cork) |

| 15 March 2014 Round 4 | Dublin | 1–22 – 3–13 | Kilkenny | Parnell Park |
| 19:00 | D Sutcliffe (1-05), A McCrabbe (0-06, 0-062f, 0-01 sideline, 0-01 '65), C Keaney (0–3, 0-01f), J Boland (0-03), J McCaffrey (0-01); C Cronin (0-01), R O'Dwyer (0-01), D O'Callaghan (0-01), M Schutte (0-01). | Report | J Power (1-01), E Larkin (0-04, 0-3f, 0-01 '65); C Fennelly (1-00), TJ Reid (1–0 pen), P Walsh (0-02), R Hogan (0-01f), C Buckley (0-01); W Walsh (0-01), J Farrell (0-01), A Fogarty (0-01), R Power (0-01). | Referee: J Sexton (Cork) |

| 16 March 2014 Round 4 | Clare | 5–18 – 0–20 | Waterford | Cusack Park |
| 14:00 | S O'Donnell 2–2; Colin Ryan 0–6 (5f); P Collins 1–2; P Duggan 1–1; P Donnellan 1–0; C McInerney 0–2; B Bugler, Conor Ryan, P O'Connor, C McGrath, T Kelly, 0–1 each. | Report | Pauric Mahony 0–8 (6f); B O'Sullivan 0–4; M Shanahan 0–3 (2f); S Molumphy 0–2; R Donnelly, K Moran, S Roche, 0–1 each. | Referee: J McGrath (Westmeath) |

| 16 March 2014 Round 4 | Galway | 3–16 – 1–19 | Tipperary | Pearse Stadium |
| 14:00 | C Cooney (1 pen, 3f), N Healy 1–3 each, J Glynn 1–1, D Burke (1 sideline), P Brehony 0–3 each, J Coen, I Tannian, C Mannion 0–1 each. | Report | S Callanan 1–11 (1-8f, 1 65), J O'Dwyer, K Bergin and S McGrath 0–2 each, N McGrath and M Heffernan 0–1 each. | Referee: A Stapleton (Laois) |

| 23 March 2014 Round 5 | Tipperary | 1–19 – 0–19 | Dublin | Semple Stadium |
| 14:00 | S Callanan (0–11, 8f), P Maher (1-00), N McGrath (0-03), J O'Dwyer (0-02), M Cahill (0-01), K Bergin (0-01), R Maher (0-01). | Report | A McCrabbe (0–10, 8f), R O'Dwyer (0-03), D Sutcliffe (0-03), M Carton (0-02), J Boland (0-01f). | Attendance: 4,768; Referee: B Gavin (Offaly) |

| 23 March 2014 Round 5 | Kilkenny | 4–22 – 0–14 | Waterford | Nowlan Park |
| 14:00 | H Shefflin (0-07, 5f), M Kelly (2-00), E Larkin (1-02), C Fennelly (0-04), J Farrell (1-00), R Hogan (0-03), W Walsh (0-03), R Power (0-02), B Kennedy (0-01). | Report | Pauric Mahony (0-05; 5f), R Barry (0-04), B O'Sullivan (0-02), S O'Sullivan (0-01), J Barron (0-01), A Gleeson (0-01). | Referee: J Owens (Wexford) |

| 23 March 2014 Round 5 | Clare | 0–18 – 1–15 | Galway | Cusack Park |
| 14:00 | T Kelly (0–12, 11fs), C McGrath (0-03), C Ryan (0-02, 1f), D Reidy (0-01). | Report | C Cooney (0-06, 5fs), C Mannion (1-02), N Burke (0-03), J Glynn (0-01), J Coen (0-01), P Brehony (0-01), D Hayes (0-01). | Referee: D Kirwan (Cork) |

==== Top scorers ====
===== Season =====
| Rank | Player | County | Tally | Total | Matches | Average |
|---|---|---|---|---|---|---|
| 2 | Pauric Mahony | Waterford | 1–53 | 56 | 6 | 9.33 |
| 1 | Séamus Callanan | Tipperary | 5–62 | 77 | 7 | 11.00 |
| 3 | Conor Cooney | Galway | 3–38 | 47 | 6 | 7.83 |
| 4 | Colin Ryan | Clare | 1–38 | 41 | 6 | 6.83 |
| 5 | Alan McCrabbe | Dublin | 0–38 | 38 | 6 | 6.33 |

===== Single game =====
| Rank | Player | County | Tally | Total | Opposition |
|---|---|---|---|---|---|
| 1 | T. J. Reid | Kilkenny | 3–8 | 17 | Wexford |
| 2 | Séamus Callanan | Tipperary | 3–6 | 15 | Kilkenny |
| 3 | Séamus Callanan | Tipperary | 1–11 | 14 | Galway |
| 4 | Colin Fennelly | Kilkenny | 3–5 | 14 | Tipperary |
| 5 | Conor Cooney | Galway | 1–9 | 12 | Limerick |
| 5 | Colin Ryan | Clare | 1–9 | 12 | Kilkenny |
| 5 | Henry Shefflin | Kilkenny | 0–12 | 12 | Clare |
| 5 | Tony Kelly | Clare | 0–12 | 12 | Galway |
| 9 | Patrick Horgan | Cork | 1–8 | 11 | Tipperary |
| 9 | Ian Byrne | Wexford | 1–8 | 11 | Kilkenny |
| 9 | Pauric Mahony | Waterford | 1–8 | 11 | Dublin |
| 9 | Conor Cooney | Galway | 1–8 | 11 | Kilkenny |
| 9 | Pauric Mahony | Waterford | 0–11 | 11 | Galway |
| 9 | Séamus Callanan | Tipperary | 0–11 | 11 | Dublin |
| 9 | Pauric Mahony | Waterford | 0–11 | 11 | Dublin |

== Division 1B ==
=== Division 1B ===
Promotion & NHL quarter-finals NHL quarter-finals Relegation play-off

| Team | Pld | W | D | L | F | A | Diff | Pts |
|---|---|---|---|---|---|---|---|---|
| Cork (P) | 5 | 4 | 1 | 0 | 3–97 | 3–74 | 23 | 9 |
| Limerick | 5 | 3 | 2 | 0 | 7–89 | 5–65 | 30 | 8 |
| Wexford | 5 | 3 | 0 | 2 | 7–83 | 7–80 | 3 | 6 |
| Laois | 5 | 2 | 0 | 3 | 5–78 | 5–87 | −9 | 4 |
| Offaly | 5 | 1 | 1 | 3 | 12–87 | 10–86 | 7 | 3 |
| Antrim | 5 | 0 | 0 | 5 | 6–65 | 10–107 | −54 | 0 |

==== Fixtures and results ====
| 15 February 2014 Round 1 | Cork | 0–17 – 0–17 | Limerick | Páirc Uí Rinn |
| 19:00 | P Horgan 0–8 (0-2f), C Lehane, C McCarthy, S Moylan, A Cadogan 0–2 each, M O'Sullivan 0–1. | Report | S Dowling 0–11 (0-8f, 0–2 65), P Browne 0–3, P O'Brien 0–2, C Allis 0–1. | Attendance: 7,000; Referee: J Owens (Wexford) |

| 16 February 2014 Round 1 | Antrim | 1–11 – 0–15 | Wexford | Páirc Mac Uílín |
| 14:00 | P Shiels 0–7 (5fs), D McKernan 1–0, C Carson 0–2, N McKenna, Conor Johnston 0–1 each | Report | J Guiney 0–5 (4fs, 1 '65'), P Morris 0–3, D O'Keeffe, L Og McGovern 0–2 each, A Shore, I Byrne, R Jacob 0–1 each | Referee: J McGrath (Westmeath) |

| 16 February 2014 Round 1 | Offaly | 2–14 – 1–19 | Laois | O'Connor Park |
| 14:00 | J Bergin 0–8 (7fs), B Carroll 0–4 (2fs), D Currams, D Mooney 1–0 each, C Doughan (f), S Quirke 0–1 each | Report | S Maher 1–9 (1-0f, 7fs), C Dwyer 0–3, N Foyle, T Fitzgerald 0–2 each, C Collier, J Purcell, W Hyland 0–1 each | Referee: J Keenan (Wicklow) |

| 22 February 2014 Round 2 | Laois | 0–7 – 0–14 | Cork | O'Moore Park |
| 19:00 | Stephen Maher 0–6 (0-6f), Tommy Fitzgerald 0–1. | Report | Patrick Horgan 0–6 (0-5f), Alan Cadogan 0–3, Seamus Harnedy 0–2, Christopher Joyce, William Egan, Stephen Moylan 0–1 each. | Referee: C Browne |

| 23 February 2014 Round 2 | Wexford | 2–19 – 2–13 | Offaly | O'Kennedy Park |
| 14:00 | P Morris 0–6 (2fs), G Moore 0–5, L Og McGovern 1–2, I Byrne 1–1 (1f), J Guiney (2fs), D O'Keeffe 0–2 each, S Tomkins 0–1. | Report | B Carroll 0–7 (3fs), J Bergin 1–3 (0-3fs), C Mahon 1–2, S Quirke 0–1. | Referee: C McAllister (Cork) |

| 23 February 2014 Round 2 | Limerick | 3–28 – 0–12 | Antrim | Gaelic Grounds |
| 14:00 | C Allis 0–11 (6fs), S Tobin 1–3, T Ryan 0–4, D Reidy, W Hickey 1–0 each, W McNamara, T O'Brien 0–2 each, D O'Grady, P O'Brien, T Quaid, J Ryan 0–1 each. | Report | P Shields 0–7 (3fs), C Clarke, D Hamill, N McKenna, N McAuley, N McManus 0–1 each. | Attendance: 1,252; Referee: B Kelly (Westmeath) |

| 9 March 2014 Round 3 | Limerick | 1–14 – 2–8 | Wexford | Gaelic Grounds |
| 13:15 | C Allis 0–10 (8fs, 1 '65), G Mulcahy 1–2, K Downes, S Dowling (1f) 0–1 each. | Report | P Morris, R Jacob 1–2 each, J Guiney 0–2 (2fs), D O'Keeffe, H Kehoe 0–1 each. | Referee: J Ryan (Tipperary). |

| 9 March 2014 Round 3 | Laois | 2–21 – 0–21 | Antrim | O'Moore Park |
| 14:00 | R King 1–7 (5fs), C Dwyer, T Fitzgerald 0–3 each, N Foyle 1–0, PJ Scully, J Purcell 0–2 each, W Hyland, M Whelan (f), S Maher, J Fitzpatrick 0–1 each. | Report | C Johnston 0–7, P Shiels 0–6 (4fs), C Clarke (fs), C Carson, PJ O'Connell 0–2 each, R McCambridge, N McManus 0–1 each | Referee: J Keenan (Wicklow) |

| 9 March 2014 Round 3 | Cork | 1–24 – 1–18 | Offaly | Páirc Uí Rinn |
| 14:30 | P Horgan 1–8 (4fs), S Harnedy 0–4, A Walsh 0–3, D Kearney, W Egan, L McLoughlin 0–2 each, R O'Shea, B Lawton, C Lehane 0–1 each. | Report | J Bergin 0–6 (3fs, 1 '65'), B Carroll 0-5fs, D Currams 1–1, T Geraghty 0–3, P Geraghty, S Quirke, C Parlon 0–1 each. | Referee: A Kelly (Galway) |

| 16 March 2014 Round 4 | Offaly | 2–15 – 2–15 | Limerick | O'Connor Park |
| 14:00 | J Bergin (0–12, 0–10 frees, 0–1 '65), D Currams (1–0), P Geraghty (1–0), S Dooley (0–2), S Cleary (0-01). | Report | G Mulcahy (2–1), C Allis (0–6, 0–4 frees, 0–1 '65), K Downes (0–3), D Reidy (0–2), P Browne (0–2), P O'Brien (0-01). | Referee: D Hughes (Carlow) |

| 16 March 2014 Round 4 | Antrim | 1–12 – 0–18 | Cork | Páirc Mac Uílín |
| 14:00 | S McAfee (0–4, 2f), M Donnelly (1–1), N McManus (2fs), P Shiels (1f), C Carson (0–2 each), Barry McFall (0–1). | Report | P Horgan (0–11, 8fs, 1 65), C Lehane (0–4), P Cronin, B Hartnett, P Haughney (0–1 each). | Referee: E Hassan (Derry) |

| 16 March 2014 Round 4 | Wexford | 2–21 – 1–18 | Laois | Wexford Park |
| 14:30 | I Byrne (0–10, 0-06f, 0-01 '65'), S Tomkins (1-03), G Moore (1-00), L Óg McGovern (0-02), D O'Keeffe (0-02), P Morris (0-02), H Kehoe (0-01), R Jacob (0-01), | Report | S Maher (0-04, 0-04f), J Purcell (1-00), M Whelan (0-03, 0-01f), C Dywer (0-03), R King (0-02, 0-02f), C Collier (0-02), P Purcell (0-01), W Hyland (0-01), N Foyle (0-01), T Fitzgerald (0-01). | Referee: F Horgan (Tipperary) |

| 23 March 2014 Round 5 | Cork | 2–24 – 1–20 | Wexford | Páirc Uí Rinn |
| 14:00 | P Horgan (1–10, 1-06f, 0-01 '65'), C Lehane (1-03), S Harnedy (0-05), A Cadogan (0-03), B Hartnett (0-01), S Moylan (0-01) P Haughney (0-01). | Report | P Morris (0–10, 0-07f), J Guiney (1-01), D O'Keeffe (0-03), L Og McGovern (0-02), P Doran (0-02), L Chin (0-01), H Kehoe (0-01). | Referee: B Kelly (Westmeath) |

| 23 March 2014 Round 5 | Laois | 1–13 – 1–17 | Limerick | O'Moore Park |
| 14:00 | T Fitzgerald (1-01), W Hyland (0-03), J Purcell (0-03), M Whelan (0-02, 2f), S Maher (0-02, 2f), P Purcell (0-01), D Palmer (0-01). | Report | S Dowling (1–03, 3f), D Reidy (0-03), C Allis (0-03, 2f), T Condon (0-02), J Ryan (0-02), W McNamara (0-01), G Mulcahy (0-01). | Referee: A Kelly (Galway) |

| 23 March 2014 Round 5 | Offaly | 5–27 – 4–9 | Antrim | O'Connor Park |
| 14:00 | S Quirke (2-05), S Cleary (2-03), S Dooley (0-08, 0–03 frees, 0-02 '65s), Ciarán Slevin (1-04), C Doughan (0-04), C Coughlan (0-02), K Brady (0-01). | Report | PJ O'Connell (3-00), C Clarke (0-05, frees), N Elliot (1-01), M Bradley (0-02), S McAfee (0-01). | Referee: J Ryan (Tipperary) |

| 30 March 2014 Relegation play-off | Antrim | 1–18 – 1–14 | Offaly | Páirc Mac Uílín |
| 14:00 | P Shiels (0-09, 0-04f, 0-01 '65'), C Carson (1-01), PJ O'Connell (0-03), N McManus (0-03, 0-01f), E Campbell (0-02). | Report | S Quirke (1-02), J Bergin (0-05, 0-04f), B Carroll (0-03), D Currams (0-02), C Mahon (0-01), S Dooley (0-01). | Referee: J Owens (Wexford) |

| 12 April 2014 Relegation/promotion final | Offaly | 3-19 - 0-14 | Kerry | Semple Stadium |
| 18:30 | S Quirke 2-1, J Bergin 1-1, B Carroll 0-8 (5f), C Mahon, S Dooley 0-2 each, C Egan, K Connolly, D Currams, S Cleary, T Geraghty 0-1 each | Report | S Nolan 0-8 (3f, 1 ’65′), C Harty 0-2, D O’Connell, B O’Leary, P Boyle, B Brosnan 0-1 each. | Referee: J Ryan (Tipperary) |

==== Top scorers ====
===== Season =====
| Rank | Player | County | Tally | Total | Matches | Average |
|---|---|---|---|---|---|---|
| 1 | Patrick Horgan | Cork | 2–43 | 49 | 5 | 9.80 |
| 2 | Joe Bergin | Offaly | 1–29 | 32 | 4 | 8.00 |
| 3 | Conor Allis | Limerick | 0–31 | 31 | 5 | 6.20 |
| 4 | Stephen Maher | Laois | 1–22 | 25 | 5 | 5.00 |
| 5 | Paul Shields | Antrim | 0–22 | 22 | 5 | 4.40 |

===== Single game =====
| Rank | Player | County | Tally | Total | Opposition |
|---|---|---|---|---|---|
| 1 | Patrick Horgan | Cork | 1–10 | 13 | Wexford |
| 2 | Stephen Maher | Laois | 1–9 | 12 | Offaly |
| 2 | Joe Bergin | Offaly | 0–12 | 12 | Limerick |
| 4 | Stephen Quirke | Offaly | 1–8 | 11 | Antrim |
| 4 | Patrick Horgan | Cork | 1–8 | 11 | Offaly |
| 4 | Patrick Horgan | Cork | 0–11 | 11 | Antrim |
| 4 | Shane Dowling | Limerick | 0–11 | 11 | Cork |
| 4 | Conor Allis | Limerick | 0–11 | 11 | Antrim |
| 9 | Ross King | Laois | 1–7 | 10 | Antrim |
| 9 | Paul Morris | Wexford | 0–10 | 10 | Cork |
| 9 | Conor Allis | Limerick | 0–10 | 10 | Wexford |
| 9 | Ian Byrne | Wexford | 0–10 | 10 | Laois |

== Division 1 Knockout ==
| 30 March 2014 Relegation play-off | Waterford | 1–17 – 4–13 | Dublin | Walsh Park |
| 15:30 | Pauric Mahony 0–11 (8fs), D Fives 1–0, R Donnelly 0–2, S Walsh, J Nagle, R Barry, B O'Sullivan 0–1 each. | Report | D Sutcliffe 2–0, A McCrabbe 0–6 (4fs), P Ryan 1–2 (1-0f), C Cronin 1–0, R O'Dwyer 0–2, C Keaney, M Schutte, D O'Callaghan 0–1 each. | Referee: J Ryan (Tipperary) |

=== Quarter-finals ===
| 30 March 2014 Quarter-final | Wexford | 2–16 – 4–22 | Kilkenny | Wexford Park |
| 15:30 | I Byrne 1–8 (6f); R Jacob 1–3; D O'Keeffe; H Kehoe; J Guiney; L Óg McGovern. P Doran 0–1 each. | Report | TJ Reid 3–8 (1-4f, 0–1 65); W Walsh 1–3; R Power; M Kelly 0–3 each; M Fennelly 0–2; J Tyrrell; R Hogan; E Larkin 0–1 each. | Referee: C McAllister (Cork) |

| 30 March 2014 Quarter-final | Tipperary | 3–25 – 4–19 | Cork | Semple Stadium |
| 15:45 | J O'Dwyer 1–7; S Callanan 0–8 (3f, 0–1 65); D Maher 1–1; N O'Meara 1–0; J Woodlock 0–2; N McGrath 0–2; S Bourke 0–2; C O'Brien, B Maher and K Bergin 0–1 each. | Report | P Horgan 1–8 (5f, 0–1 65); S Harnedy 2–0; A Nash 1–0 (f); J Coughlan 0–3; C Lehane 0–3; D Kearney 0–2; K Burke, W Egan and P Cronin 0–1 each. | Referee: B Kelly (Westmeath) |

| 30 March 2014 Quarter-final | Laois | 2–19 – 2–23 | Clare | O'Moore Park |
| 15:30 | S Maher 0–6 (6f); B Reddin 1–1; T Fitzgerald, P Purcell 0–3 each; N Foyle 1–0; M Whelan (1f, 1 65), W Hyland 0–2 each; C Dwyer, B Stapleton 0–1 each | Report | Colin Ryan 0–10 (8f); S O'Donnell 2–0; C McGrath 0–4; Tony Kelly 0–3; A Cunningham 0–2; P O'Connor, B Duggan, C McInerney, J Conlon 0–1 each. | Referee: A Kelly (Galway) |

| 30 March 2014 Quarter-final | Limerick | 1–12 – 1–20 | Galway | Gaelic Grounds |
| 15:30 | J Ryan 1–3; K Downes and S Dowling 0–3 each (2f, 1 65); G Mulcahy, C Allis and A Dempsey 0–1 each. | Report | C Cooney 1–9 (1–0 pen, 0-5f, 0–4 65); David Burke 0–3; P Brehony, J Glynn 0–2 each; N Burke, N Healy, C Mannion and D Hayes 0–1 each. |

=== Semi-finals ===
| 20 April 2014 Semi-final | Kilkenny | 1-16 - 0-15 | Galway | Gaelic Grounds |
| 14:00 | TJ Reid (0-5, 4 frees); H Shefflin (0-4); J Power (1-0); C Fennelly (0-3); P Walsh (0-2); C Buckley, M Fennelly (0-1 each) | Report | C Cooney (0-8, 3 frees, 1 65); A Smith (0-2); C Callanan (0-1 free); David Burke, N Burke, J Canning, C Mannion (0-1 each) | Attendance: 20,452; Referee: James McGrath |

| 20 April 2014 Semi-final | Tipperary | 2-24 - 2-17 | Clare | Gaelic Grounds |
| 16:00 | S Callanan (0-12, two 65s, six frees); Patrick Maher (2-0); N O’Meara (0-3); J O’Dwyer, S Bourke (0-2 each); J Barry, J Woodlock, D Maher, N McGrath, G Ryan (0-1 each) | Report | C Ryan (0-5, four frees); P Donnellan, C McInerney (1-1 each); C Galvin, T Kelly, C McGrath, P Collins (0-2 each); D McInerney, J Conlon (0-1 each) | Attendance: 20,452; Referee: Colm Lyons |

=== Division 1 final ===
| 4 May Final | Tipperary | 1-27 - 2-25 (AET) | Kilkenny | Semple Stadium |
| 15:30 | S Callanan 0-9 (8f, 1 65), J O’Dwyer 1-3, N McGrath 0-5 (1 sl), Denis Maher and N O’Meara 0-2 each, K Bergin, J Woodlock and Patrick Maher 0-1 each. | Report | TJ Reid 2-11 (2-0 pen, 8f, 1 65), R Hogan 0-6, R Power 0-3 (1f), M Fennelly and P Walsh 0-2 each, C Fennelly 0-1. | Attendance: 21,601; Referee: James Owens (Wexford) |

== Division 2A ==
=== Division 2A ===
Division winners Relegated

| Team | Pld | W | D | L | F | A | Diff | Pts |
|---|---|---|---|---|---|---|---|---|
| Kerry | 5 | 5 | 0 | 0 | 14–92 | 6–72 | 44 | 10 |
| Carlow | 5 | 4 | 0 | 1 | 7–88 | 4–55 | 41 | 8 |
| Derry | 5 | 2 | 1 | 2 | 11–58 | 9–79 | −15 | 5 |
| London | 5 | 1 | 1 | 3 | 2–70 | 5–73 | −12 | 3 |
| Westmeath | 5 | 1 | 1 | 3 | 5–60 | 9–72 | −24 | 3 |
| Kildare (R) | 5 | 0 | 1 | 4 | 5–71 | 11–88 | −35 | 1 |

==== Fixtures and results ====
| 15 February 2014 Round 1 | Kerry | 4–24 – 3–9 | Derry | Ballinascreen |
| 14:00 | S Nolan 1–11 (1 '65', 9fs) D O'Connell 0–7, A Boyle 2–1, D Collins 1–1, C Harty, P Lucid, J Egan, M Boyle 0–1 each. | Report | A Grant (1-4fs), J O'Dwyer 1–1, P McCloskey 1–0, O McCloskey, B Rodgers, S McCloskey, C Convery 0–1 each. | Referee: G Duffy (Antrim) |

| 15 February 2014 Round 1 | Carlow | 1–18 – 1–9 | Kildare | St Conleth's Park |
| 14:00 | M Kavanagh 1–7(0-3fs); S Murphy 0–3; A Gaule, P Kehoe, C Wall 0–2 each; James Doyle, D English (f) 0–1 each. | Report | G Keegan 0–6 (5fs); P Divilly 1–2 (0-2fs), P Fitzgerald 0–1. | Referee: J Heffernan (Wexford) |

| 15 February 2014 Round 1 | London | 0–13 – 0–13 | Westmeath | Emerald GAA Grounds |
| 14:00 | E Kelly 0–4 (3fs), S Lambert (2fs), M Duggan, M Holohan 0–2 each, L Hands, H Vaughan, C Hickey 0–1 each. | Report | N Conaty 0–8 (7fs), D Gavin 0–2, D Fennell, D McNicholas, R Greville 0–1 each. | Referee: A Stapleton (Laois) |

| 23 February 2014 Round 2 | Carlow | 2–12 – 0–8 | London | Dr. Cullen Park |
| 13:00 | M Kavanagh 0–7 (4fs), S Murphy 1–2, C Wall 1–1, P Kehoe, R Smithers 0–1 each. | | S Lambert 0–4 (1f, 1 '65', 1 line ball), E Kelly (1f), L Hands, H Vaughan, C Hickey 0–1 each. |

| 23 February 2014 Round 2 | Kerry | 2–24 – 0–13 | Kildare | Austin Stack Park |
| 14:00 | M Boyle 1–5 (2 s-l), S Nolan 0–8 (3 '65s', 2fs), D Butler 1–2, J Egan 0–3, D O Connell 0–2 (1f), C Harty 0–2, S Weir, D Collins 0–1 each. | | W Greene 0-4fs, R Hoban 0-2fs, P Fitzgerald 0–2, R Casey, G Keegan, M Fitzgerald, E O Neill (f), R McLoughney 0–1 each. |

| 23 February 2014 Round 2 | Westmeath | 0–8 – 3–11 | Derry | Cusack Park |
| 14:00 | N Conaty 0–3 (2fs), D McNicholas 0–2 (1f), A McGrath, R Greville, N O'Brien (f) 0–1 each. | | B Rodgers 2–2, A Grant 0–6 (5fs), P McCloskey 1–0, O McCloskey, D O'Neill, T McCloskey (f) 0–1 each. |

| 2 March 2014 Round 4 | Derry | 1–13 – 0–10 | London | Celtic Park |
| 12:30 | R Convery (1–7, 1-5f, 0–1 65'), B Rogers (0–2), J O'Dwyer (0–2), O McCloskey (0–1), C Convery (0–1). | Report | S Lambert (0–7, 0-3f), J Grealish (0-1pen), D Moore (0–1), M Duggan (0–1). | Referee: O Elliot (Antrim) |

| 9 March 2014 Round 3 | Westmeath | 2–15 – 3–13 | Kerry | Cusack Park |
| 12:45 | D McNicholas 1–5 (0–2 '65', 0-1f), N Conaty 1–3 (0–3 f), A Devine 0–2, D Gavin, A McGrath, C Curley, A Craig and R Greville 0–1 each. | Report | S Nolan 0–7 (3f, 1'65'), P Boyle 1–1, D Butler and P O'Connor 1–0 each, M Boyle 0–3, C Harty and D Dineen 0–1 each. | Referee: T Carroll (Offaly) |

| 9 March 2014 Round 3 | London | 1–21 – 0–18 | Kildare | Emerald GAA Grounds |
| 14:00 | S Lambert (0–9), M Duggan (1–3), E Kelly, H Vaughan (0–3 each), P Phelan, D Moore, M Lynch (0–1 each). | | W Greene (0–9), R Casey, G Keegan (0–3 each), P Divilly (0–2), M Fitzgerald (0–1). | Referee: D O'Driscoll (Limerick) |

| 9 March 2014 Round 3 | Carlow | 2–20 – 0–12 | Derry | Dr. Cullen Park |
| 14:30 | S Murphy (1–5), M Brennan (1–2), P Kehoe (0–3), C Wall, D English (0–2 each), M Doyle, A Gaule, J Kane, M Kavanagh, James Doyle, John Doyle (0–1 each). | | R Convery (0–5), S Farrem (0–4), B Rogers, P Cleary, A Kelly (0–1 each). | Referee: J Heffernan (Wexford) |

| 16 March 2014 Round 4 | Kildare | 1–14 – 3–11 | Westmeath | St. Conleth's Park |
| 12:30 | G Keegan (1–5), P Divilly (0–4), B Deay (0–3), W Greene (0–1), R Casey (0–1). | Report | A Devine (2–1), N Conaty (1–4), N Kirby (0–2), A McGrath (0–2), D Fennell (0–1), D McNicholas (0–1). | Referee: D O'Driscoll |

| 16 March 2014 Round 4 | Kerry | 3–14 – 0–17 | Carlow | Austin Stack Park |
| 13:00 | D O'Connell (1–3), S Nolan (0–5), M Boyle (1–1), P Boyle (1–0), C Harty (0–2), D Collins (0–1), D Butler (0–1), B Brosnan (0–1). | Report | D English (0–7), S Murphy (0–5), J Doyle (0–2), C Wall (0–1), A Gaule (0–1), M Kavanagh (0–1). | Referee: C Lyons |

| 23 March 2014 Round 5 | London | 1–18 – 2–17 | Kerry | Emerald GAA Grounds |
| 14:00 | S Lambert 0–7 (3fs, 1 '65′, 0–1 pen), H Vaughan 1–3, E Kelly 0–4, M Duggan 0–3, R Foy 0–1. | Report | S Nolan 1–3 (0-3fs), B Brosnan 0–5 (2fs), D Butler 0–4, P Boyle 1–1 (1f), P Lucid, K Carmody, J Leahy, J Griffin 0–1 each. | Referee: D Hughes (Carlow) |

| 23 March 2014 Round 5 | Carlow | 2–21 – 0–13 | Westmeath | Dr. Cullen Park |
| 14:00 | S Kavanagh (2–0), S Murphy (0–5), D English (0–5), M Kavanagh (0–3), J Kavanagh (0–2), R Smithers (0–2), J Doyle (0–2), M Brennan (0–1), D Roberts (0–1). | Report | N Conaty (0–4), C Curley (0–4), N O'Brien (0–3), A McGrath (0–1), A Devine (0–1). | Referee: S Cleere |

| 23 March 2014 Round 5 | Kildare | 3–17 – 4–14 | Derry | St. Conleth's Park |
| 14:00 | P Divilly (4fs), G Keegan (2fs) 0–6 each; D Harney 1–2; M Fitzgerald 1–1; E O'Neill 1–0; R Kelly, K Whelan 0–1 each. | Report | R Convery 1–10 (8fs); B Rogers 2–1; A Kelly 1–3. | Referee: J Keenan (Wicklow) |

| 5 April 2014 Final | Kerry | 3–16 – 3–13 | Carlow | Semple Stadium |
| 15:45 | S Nolan 1-6 (1-0 pen, 4fs), C Harty 1-2, J Egan 1-1, P Boyle, D Butler 0-2 each, D Dineen (1 sl), D O’Connell, D Collins 0-1 each. | Report | D Murphy 1-5 (4fs), M Kavanagh 2-1, E Byrne 0-2, A Corcoran, D English (f), S Murphy, J Doyle, R Smithers 0-1 each. | Referee: F Horgan (Tipperary) |

==== Top scorers ====
===== Season =====
| Rank | Player | County | Tally | Total | Matches | Average |
|---|---|---|---|---|---|---|
| 1 | Shane Nolan | Kerry | 2–34 | 40 | 5 | 8.00 |
| 2 | Noel Conaty | Westmeath | 2–22 | 28 | 5 | 5.60 |
| 3 | Seán Murphy | Carlow | 2–20 | 26 | 5 | 5.20 |
| 4 | Gerry Keegan | Kildare | 1–21 | 24 | 5 | 4.80 |
| 5 | Marty Kavanagh | Carlow | 1–19 | 22 | 5 | 4.40 |

===== Single game =====
| Rank | Player | County | Tally | Total | Opposition |
|---|---|---|---|---|---|
| 1 | Shane Nolan | Kerry | 1–11 | 14 | Derry |
| 2 | Ruairí Convery | Derry | 1–10 | 13 | Kildare |
| 3 | Marty Kavanagh | Carlow | 1–7 | 10 | Kildare |
| 3 | Ruairí Convery | Derry | 1–7 | 10 | London |
| 5 | Stephen Lambert | London | 0–9 | 9 | Kildare |
| 5 | Willie Greene | Kildare | 0–9 | 9 | London |
| 7 | Brendan Rodgers | Derry | 2–2 | 8 | Westmeath |
| 7 | Gerry Keegan | Kildare | 1–5 | 8 | Westmeath |
| 7 | Mikey Boyle | Kerry | 1–5 | 8 | Kildare |
| 7 | Derek McNicholas | Westmeath | 1–5 | 8 | Kerry |
| 7 | Seán Murphy | Carlow | 1–5 | 8 | Derry |
| 7 | Shane Nolan | Kerry | 0–8 | 8 | Kildare |

== Division 2B ==
=== Division 2B ===
Division final/Promotion play-off Relegation play-off

| Team | Pld | W | D | L | F | A | Diff | Pts |
|---|---|---|---|---|---|---|---|---|
| Down | 5 | 5 | 0 | 0 | 9–79 | 3–51 | 46 | 10 |
| Wicklow (C) (P) | 5 | 4 | 0 | 1 | 6–86 | 3–55 | 40 | 8 |
| Meath | 5 | 3 | 0 | 2 | 6–74 | 7–46 | 25 | 6 |
| Mayo | 5 | 2 | 0 | 3 | 3–61 | 4–62 | −4 | 4 |
| Fingal (R) | 5 | 1 | 0 | 4 | 10–52 | 16–99 | −65 | 2 |
| Armagh | 5 | 0 | 0 | 5 | 7–55 | 8–92 | −32 | 0 |

==== Fixtures and results ====
| 16 February 2014 Round 1 | Mayo | 2–13 – 3–9 | Fingal | Connacht GAA Centre 3G Pitch |
| 13:00 | S Hoban (2–3), K Feeney (0-5f), F Boland (0–4), D McDonnell (0–1). | Report | J M Sheridan (1–4, 0-3f, 0-1'65), C Foley (1–2), K O'Flynn (1–0), D Hattie (0–1), N Kidd (0–1), D Smyth (0–1). |

| 16 February 2014 Round 1 | Armagh | 1–7 – 2–20 | Down | Athletic Grounds |
| 14:00 | M Lennon 1–5 (0–5 frees), C Corvan 0–2. | Report | S Nicholson 1–2 (1f) P Sheehan 0–4 (1f 1'45'), C Bailie 0–4, C O'Neill 1–0 pen, B Coleman 0-3S Dineen 0–2, C Woods 0–2 (both '45's'), D Hughes 0–1, J McGrath 0–1, F Conway 0–1. | Referee: P O'Dwyer (Carlow) |

| 16 February 2014 Round 1 | Wicklow | 1–15 – 0–8 | Meath | Pearse Park |
| 14:00 | M Lee (0–6 fs), W O'Gorman (1–1), A O'Brien (0–4), C Moorehouse (0–2), R Keddy (0–1), D Staunton (0–1). | Report | P Durnin (0–3), J Toher (0–3 fs), D Reilly (0-1f), A Gannon (0–1). |

| 23 February 2014 Round 2 | Down | 1–15 – 0–10 | Wicklow | McKenna Park |
| 14:00 | C Baillie (1–1), P Sheehan (0–4, 2f), C O'Neill (0–2), J McCusker (0–2, 1f), C Woods (0-2f), F Conway (0–2), D Toner (0–1), S Nicholson (0–1). | Report | M Lee (0–8, 4f, 0–1 sideline), J Henderson (0–1), A O'Brien (0–1). |

| 23 February 2014 Round 2 | Meath | 0–12 – 0–7 | Mayo | St. Loman's Park |
| 14:00 | James Toher (0–7, 6fs, 1 65), Shane Whitty (0–1), Willie McGrath (0–1); Derek Doran (0–1), Peter Durnin (0–1), Tom McGrath (0–1). | Report | Kenny Feeney (0–6, 5fs, 1 65), Cathal Freeman (0–1). | Referee: P O'Dwyer (Carlow) |

| 23 February 2014 Round 2 | Fingal | 2–18 – 2–13 | Armagh | Lawless Memorial Park |
| 14:00 | JM Sheridan 0–11 (5fs, 1 pen), K O'Flynn 1–2, P Daly 1–1, R McGarry, P Graves 0–2 each. | Report | M Lennon 0–7 (5fs), L McKee 1–1, F Bradley 1–0, J Corvan 0–2, K McKernan, C Corvan, C McCarvill 0–1 each. | Referee: P Murphy (Carlow) |

| 9 March 2014 Round 3 | Wicklow | 2–14 – 0–15 | Armagh | Aughrim County Ground |
| 12:45 | C Moorehouse (1–3), M Lee (0–6), W O'Gorman (1–2), D Staunton (0–2), J Henderson (0–1). | Report | M Lennon (0–8), C Corvan (0–3), F Bradley (0–1), C Carvill (0–1), N Green (0–1), S Gaffney (0–1). | Referee: D Hughes |

| 9 March 2014 Round 3 | Down | 0–17 – 0–13 | Mayo | Páirc Esler |
| 14:00 | C Woods (0–5), C O'Neill (0–3), D Hughes (0–2), P Sheehan (0–2), C Bailie (0–2), F Conway (0–1), S Dineen (0–1), M Turley (0–1). | Report | K Feeney (0–8), P O'Flynn (0–1), G Nolan (0–1), C Charlton (0–1), B Higgins (0–1), K McDermott (0–1). | Referee: G Duffy |

| 9 March 2014 Round 3 | Meath | 5–22 – 1–7 | Fingal | St. Loman's Park |
| 14:00 | D Doran (3–3), W McGrath (1–6), P Conneely (0–7, 6fs, 1 65), A Gannon (1–1), J Regan (0–3, 2fs), S Geraghty (0–2). | Report | JM Sheridan (0–6, 4fs, 1 65), C Foley (1–1). | Referee: P Murphy (Carlow) |

| 16 March 2014 Round 4 | Mayo | 0–9 – 0–15 | Wicklow | MacHale Park |
| 12:45 | K McDermott (0–2), P O'Flynn (0–2), B Hunt (0–2), G Nolan (0–1), K Feeney (0–1), F Boland (0–1). | Report | M Lee (0–8), A O'Brien (0–3), C Moorehouse (0–2), J O'Neill (0–1), W O'Gorman (0–1). | Referee: J Keane |

| 16 March 2014 Round 4 | Fingal | 2–10 – 4–19 | Down | Lawless Memorial Park |
| 14:00 | JM Sheridan (0–7), C O'Flynn (1–1), A Richardson (1–0), R McGarry (0–1), C Foley (0–1). | Report | C Baillie (0–7), E Sands (2–0), C O'Neill (1–1), D Hughes (0–4), C O'Prey (1–0), C Woods (0–2), D Toner (0–1), M Turley (0–1), P Sheahan (0–1), J McCusker (0–1), E Clarke (0–1). | Referee: G Quilty |

| 16 March 2014 Round 4 | Armagh | 3–9 – 1–21 | Meath | Athletic Grounds |
| 14:00 | M Lennon (1–5 3fs [0–1 sp]), C Corvan (1–2), P Gaffney (1–1), F Bradley (0–1). | Report | A Gannon (1–3), D Doran (0–4), S Morris (0–3), D Healy (0–3), P Conneely (0-3fs), W McGrath (0–2), M Burke (0–1). | Referee: L Mac Amhlaoibh (Antrim) |

| 23 March 2014 Round 5 | Wicklow | 3–32 – 2–8 | Fingal | Pearse Park |
| 14:00 | M Lee (2–14, 0-5f), A O'Brien (1–2), R Keddy (0–4), D Staunton (0–3), J O'Neill (0–3), W O'Gorman (0–2), J Henderson (0–1), C Moorehouse (0–1), A Nugent (0–1), G Byrne (0–1). | Report | C Foley (2–0), JM Sheridan (0-6f), D Butterley (0–1), D De Burca (0–1). | Referee: J Heffernan |

| 23 March 2014 Round 5 | Down | 2–8 – 0–11 | Meath | McKenna Park |
| 14:00 | F Conway (2–1), D Hughes (0–2), C Woods (0-2fs), S Ennis (0–2), D Toner (0–1). | Report | W McGrath (0–3), S Clynch (0–3, 2f), C Fitzsimons (0–2), J Regan (0-1f), M Burke (0–1), D Doran (0–1). |

| 23 March 2014 Round 5 | Armagh | 1–11 – 1–19 | Mayo | Athletic Grounds |
| 14:00 | D Coulter (0–6, 4f), M Lennon (1–1), P Gaffney (0–1), C Carvill (0–1), R Gaffney (0–1), C Corvan (0–1). | Report | K Feeney (0–12, 5f), K Keena (1–1), F Boland (0–2), B Hunt (0–1), S Regan (0–1), S Hoban (0–1), G Nolan (0–1). | Referee: C Cunning (Antrim) |

| 30 March 2014 Relegation play-off | Fingal | 0–8 – 4–12 | Armagh | Inniskeen |
| | J Sheridan 0–4 (2fs), D De Burca 0–2 (1f), N Feeney, D Butterley 0–1 each. | Report | D Coulter 3–5, E McGuinness 1–2, C Corvan 0–2, F Bradley (f) C Carville, O Curry 0–1 each. | Referee: O Elliot (Antrim) |

| 5 April 2014 Final | Down | 1–18 – 0–23 | Wicklow | Páirc Tailteann |

| 13 April 2014 Relegation/promotion final | Fingal | 0-8 - 2-16 | Donegal | Breffni Park |

==== Top scorers ====
===== Season =====
| Rank | Player | County | Tally | Total | Matches | Average |
|---|---|---|---|---|---|---|
| 1 | Mikey Lee | Wicklow | 2–42 | 48 | 5 | 9.60 |
| 2 | J. M. Sheridan | Fingal | 1–34 | 37 | 5 | 7.40 |
| 3 | Mattie Lennon | Armagh | 3–26 | 35 | 5 | 7.00 |
| 4 | Kenny Feeney | Mayo | 0–32 | 32 | 5 | 6.40 |
| 5 | Derek Doran | Meath | 3–9 | 18 | 5 | 3.60 |

===== Single game =====
| Rank | Player | County | Tally | Total | Opposition |
|---|---|---|---|---|---|
| 1 | Mikey Lee | Wicklow | 2–14 | 20 | Fingal |
| 2 | Derek Doran | Meath | 3–3 | 12 | Fingal |
| 2 | Kenny Feeney | Mayo | 0–12 | 12 | Armagh |
| 4 | J. M. Sheridan | Fingal | 0–11 | 11 | Armagh |
| 5 | Stephen Hoban | Mayo | 2–3 | 9 | Fingal |
| 5 | Willie McGrath | Meath | 1–6 | 9 | Fingal |
| 7 | Mattie Lennon | Armagh | 1–5 | 8 | Down |
| 7 | Mattie Lennon | Armagh | 1–5 | 8 | Meath |
| 7 | Mikey Lee | Wicklow | 0–8 | 8 | Down |
| 7 | Mikey Lee | Wicklow | 0–8 | 8 | Mayo |
| 7 | Mattie Lennon | Armagh | 0–8 | 8 | Wicklow |
| 7 | Kenny Feeney | Mayo | 0–8 | 8 | Down |

== Division 3A ==
=== Division 3A ===
Division winners and promotion Relegation

| Team | Pld | W | D | L | F | A | Diff | Pts |
|---|---|---|---|---|---|---|---|---|
| Roscommon | 5 | 4 | 0 | 1 | 13–69 | 2–62 | 40 | 8 |
| Donegal (P) | 5 | 4 | 0 | 1 | 8–85 | 9–56 | 26 | 8 |
| Fermanagh | 5 | 3 | 0 | 2 | 10–59 | 9–75 | −13 | 6 |
| Monaghan | 5 | 2 | 0 | 3 | 5–59 | 10–61 | −17 | 4 |
| Louth | 5 | 1 | 0 | 4 | 8–64 | 10–69 | −11 | 2 |
| Longford (R) | 5 | 1 | 0 | 4 | 7–53 | 11–66 | −25 | 2 |

==== Fixtures and results ====
| 16 February 2014 Round 1 | Louth | 1–15 – 2–16 | Roscommon | Darver GAA Grounds |
| 14:00 | D Murphy (0–10), A Mackin (1–0), S Callan (0–2), G Rellis (0–1), R Byrne (0–1), G Smith (0–1). | Report | G Fallon (0–14), Cillian Egan (1–1), N Kilroy (1–0), T Seale (0–1). | Referee: F Smith (Meath) |

| 16 February 2014 Round 1 | Donegal | 2–19 – 1–13 | Fermanagh | Fr. Tierney Park |
| 14:00 | L Henderson (1–7, 0-4f, 0-2'65), E McDermott (1–1), C Matthewson (0–4, 2f), D Cullen (0–3), S McVeigh (0–2), P Sheridan (0–1), C Kilgallon (0–1). | Report | S Corrigan (1–9, 0-9f), F McBrien (0–2), R Bogue (0-2f). | Referee: B Sweeney |

| 16 February 2014 Round 1 | Monaghan | 2–13 – 3–11 | Longford | Inniskeen |
| 14:00 | H Byrne (1–9,7f,2'65), C McKenna (1–1), B McGuigan (0–1). | Report | G Ghee (2–3), E Donnellan (1–6, 6f), C Mullane (0–2). | Referee: J Clarke (Cavan) |

| 23 February 2014 Round 2 | Roscommon | 1–8 – 1–12 | Monaghan | Woodmount |
| 14:00 | N Kilroy (1–1), G Fallon (0–3, 2f), C Egan (0–2), S Curley (0-1f), R Fallon (0–1) | Report | H Byrne (0-7f), T Forde (1–0), B McGuigan (0–3), E McSuibhne (0–1), S Leonard (0–1). |

| 23 February 2014 Round 2 | Longford | 3–9 – 1–20 | Donegal | Pearse Park |
| 14:00 | J O'Brien (2–1), C Mullane (1–2), E Donnelan (0–5, 4f), D Tanner (0–1). | Report | L Henderson (0–13, 12f, 1'65), K Campbell (1–0), C Mattewson (0–2, 1f), S McVeigh (0–2), C McDermott (0–1), P Sheridan (0–1), D Cullen (0–1). |

| 2 March 2014 Round 2 | Fermanagh | 5–13 – 2–12 | Louth | St. Patrick's Park |
| 14:00 | S Corrigan (2–6), D McGarry (2–1), B Duffy (1–0), F McBrien (0–2), R Bogue (0–1), R Porteous (0–1), JP McGarry (0–1). | | D Murphy (1–7), S Callan (1–1), D O'Hanrahan (0–2), A McCrave (0–1), J Condon (0–1). |

| 9 March 2014 Round 3 | Monaghan | 0–15 – 1–11 | Louth | Aughnamullen |
| 12:00 | H Byrne (0–12), E MacSuibhne (0–1), M Murphy (0–1), S Leonard (0–1). | Report | D Murphy (0–8), G Smith (1–0), G Rellis (0–1), S Callan (0–1), D O'Mahony (0–1). | Referee: B Sweeney |

| 9 March 2014 Round 3 | Roscommon | 3–11 – 0–15 | Donegal | Athleague |
| 14:00 | G Fallon (1–9), C Egan (2–1), T Seale (0–1). | Report | L Henderson (0–4), C Mathewson (0–3), D Cullen (0–3), J Boyle (0–1), P Sheridan (0–1), P Hannighan (0–1), S McVeigh (0–1), E Organ (0–1). | Referee: J Clarke |

| 9 March 2014 Round 3 | Longford | 0–13 – 2–8 | Fermanagh | Pearse Park |
| 14:00 | E Donnellan (0–8), C Mullane (0–3), M Coyle (0–1), G Ghee (0–1). | Report | M Beggan (1–0), F McBrien (1–0), S Corrigan (0–3), D McGarry (0–2), S Curran (0–2), A Breslin (0–1). | Referee: G McGrath |

| 16 March 2014 Round 4 | Louth | 3–11 – 1–10 | Longford | Darver |
| 12:45 | D Murphy 0–6, S Callan 1–2, D O'Mahony 1–1, G Smyth 1–0, J Condon 0–1, D O'Hanrahan 0–1. | Report |

| 16 March 2014 Round 4 | Fermanagh | 0–10 – 4–20 | Roscommon | Brewster Park |
| 14:00 | R Bogue (0–4), F Bannon (0–3), JP McGarry (0–3). | Report | J Fallon (0–8), B Kelly (2–0), N Connaughton (1–2), R Fallon (1–2), J Moran (0–2), G Fallon (0–2), T Seale (0–1), A Murphy (0–1), C Egan (0–1), J Rodgerson (0–1). | Referee: J Clarke |

| 16 March 2014 Round 4 | Donegal | 3–16 – 1–7 | Monaghan | O'Donnell Park |
| 14:00 | L Henderson (0–6), K Campbell (1–2), S McVeigh (1–1), P Hannigan (1–1), C Matthewson (0–4), R McDermott (0–1), E McDermott (0–1). | Report | S Leonard (1–2), PJ Boyle (0–2), T Hilliard (0–1), M Treanor (0–1), H Byrne (0–1). | Referee: E Elliott |

| 23 March 2014 Round 5 | Monaghan | 1–11 – 2–15 | Fermanagh | Castleblaney |
| 14:00 |

| 23 March 2014 Round 5 | Roscommon | 3–14 – 0–10 | Longford | Athleague |
| 14:00 |

| 23 March 2014 Round 5 | Louth | 1–15 – 2–15 | Donegal | Darver |
| 14:00 |

| 5 April 2014 Final | Roscommon | 2–14 – 4–12 | Donegal | Markievicz Park |
| 14:00 |

==== Top scorers ====
===== Season =====
| Rank | Player | County | Tally | Total | Matches | Average |
|---|---|---|---|---|---|---|
| 1 | Gerry Fallon | Roscommon | 1–34 | 37 | 4 | 9.25 |
| 2 | Lee Henderson | Donegal | 1–30 | 33 | 4 | 8.25 |
| 2 | Hugh Byrne | Monaghan | 1–29 | 32 | 4 | 8.00 |

== Division 3B ==
=== Division 3B ===
Division winners and promotion

| Team | Pld | W | D | L | F | A | Diff | Pts |
|---|---|---|---|---|---|---|---|---|
| Tyrone (P) | 3 | 3 | 0 | 0 | 6–43 | 3–32 | 20 | 6 |
| Leitrim | 3 | 2 | 0 | 1 | 3–33 | 3–34 | −1 | 4 |
| Warwickshire | 3 | 1 | 0 | 2 | 2–38 | 6–33 | −7 | 2 |
| Sligo | 3 | 0 | 0 | 3 | 5–24 | 4–39 | −12 | 0 |

==== Fixtures and results ====
| 2 March 2014 Round 2 | Warwickshire | 1–15 – 4–13 | Tyrone | Páirc na hÉireann |
| 14:00 |

| 9 March 2014 Round 1 | Sligo | 2–5 – 0–12 | Warwickshire | Markievicz Park |
| 13:00 |

| 9 March 2014 Round 1 | Tyrone | 0–14 – 1–7 | Leitrim | Healy Park |
| 14:00 |

| 16 March 2014 Round 2 | Leitrim | 2–11 – 2–9 | Sligo | Pairc Sheáin Uí Eislin |
| 14:00 | P O'Donnell (0–6), C Cunniffe (1–1), Z Moradi (1–0), D McGovern (0–1), B Mulvey (0–1), N McLoughlin (0–1), K McGrath (0–1). | | L Reidy (1–2), G Waldron (0–4), E McDonagh (1–0), E McCarthy (0–2), G O'Kelly Lynch (0–1). | Referee: B Sweeney |

| 23 March 2014 Round 3 | Leitrim | 0–15 – 1–11 | Warwickshire | Pairc Sheáin Uí Eislin |
| 14:00 |

| 23 March 2014 Round 3 | Sligo | 1–10 – 2–16 | Tyrone | Markievicz Park |
| 14:00 |

| 6 April 2014 Final | Tyrone | 0–13 – 1–9 | Leitrim | Markievicz Park |
| 15:45 |

==== Top scorers ====
===== Season =====
| Rank | Player | County | Tally | Total | Matches | Average |
|---|---|---|---|---|---|---|
| 1 | Pádraig O'Donnell | Leitrim | 0–10 | 10 | 2 | 5.00 |

== Tickets ==
The GAA announced in January 2014 that tickets purchased before the day of the games would cost €10, a reduction of €3 from previous seasons, whereas the cost of entry on the day of the game would be raised to €15.

| Preceded by 2013 National Hurling League | National Hurling League | Succeeded by 2015 National Hurling League |
