= 2010 All-Ireland Minor Hurling Championship =

All-Ireland Minor Hurling Championship 2010
Championship Details
- Dates: 10 April – 5 September 2010
- Teams: 25

All Ireland Champions
- Winners: Kilkenny (20th win)
- Captain: Cillian Buckley
- Manager: Richie Mulrooney

All Ireland Runners-up
- Runners-up: Clare
- Captain: Paul Flanagan
- Manager: Gerry O'Connor & Donal Moloney

Provincial Champions
- Munster: Clare
- Leinster: Kilkenny
- Ulster: Antrim
- Connacht: Not Played

Championship Statistics
- Matches Played: 32
- Top Scorer: Niall Arthur (0-50)

The 2010 All-Ireland Minor Hurling Championship was the 80th staging of the All-Ireland Minor Hurling Championship since its establishment by the Gaelic Athletic Association in 1928. The championship began on 10 April and ended on 5 September 2010.

Galway entered the championship as the defending champions, however, they were beaten by Kilkenny in the All-Ireland semi-final.

On 5 September 2010, Kilkenny won the championship after a 2-10 to 0-14 defeat of Clare in the All-Ireland final at Croke Park. This was their 20th championship title overall and their first title since 2008.

Clare's Niall Arthur was the championship's top scorer with 0-50.

== Results ==
=== Leinster Minor Hurling Championship ===
First round

10 April 2010 First round	Kildare	4-22 - 1-06	Wicklow	St. Conleth's Park, Newbridge
	M Delaney 1-5, G Keegan 1-5, F Conway 1-2, S Grimley 1-0, K Whelan 0-3, C Kenny 0-3, M Carter 0-1, J Byrne 0-1, C Nolan 0-1, P Murphy 0-1.		J O'Brien 0-4, J Henderson 1-0, A Murphy 0-1, C Baldwin 0-1.

10 April 2010 First round	Westmeath	2-16 - 0-04	Meath	Cusack Park, Mullingar
	A Clarke 1-10, N O'Brien 1-2, A Craig 0-1, S Fagan 0-1, N Kirby 0-1, G Flynn 0-1.		P Conneely 0-1, F Ferguson 0-1, J Kiely 0-1, C Fitzsimons 0-1.	Referee: T Anderson (Offaly)

Second round

1 May 2010 Second round	Westmeath	2-16 - 1-11	Laois	Cusack Park, Mullingar
	A Clarke 0-7, N O'Brien 1-3, E Kincaid 1-0, C Scally 0-3, D Higgins 0-1, A Price 0-1, J Boyle 0-1.		S Maher 0-5, P Keating 1-0, C Dwyer 0-2, G Burke 0-1, B Reddin 0-1, R Foyle 0-1, B Duggan 0-1.

1 May 2010 Second round	Carlow	4-10 - 1-09	Kildare	Dr. Cullen Park, Carlow
	D Roberts 2-1, J Doyle 0-5, R Smithers 1-1, P Coady 1-1, A McDonald 0-1, P Ahern 0-1.		M Delaney 0-6, K O'Connor 1-0, C Kenny 0-3.

1 May 2010 Second round	Kilkenny	2-13 - 0-09	Dublin	Nowlan Park, Kilkenny
	G Aylward 1-4, T O'Hanrahan 1-0, C Buckley 0-2, M Brennan 0-2, O Walsh 0-2, J Power 0-1, B Kennedy 0-1, R Reid 0-1.		C Moffat 0-3, D Flood 0-3, G Whelan 0-1, D Sutcliffe 0-1, J Hetherton 0-1.	Referee: P Murphy (Carlow)

1 May 2010 Second round	Offaly	2-17 - 3-21 (aet)	Wexford	O'Connor Park, Tullamore
	T Carroll 1-6, N Murphy 1-0, S O'Gorman 1-0, A Kealey 0-2, S Quirke 0-2, A Hynes 0-2, D King 0-2, S Cleary 0-1, E Ryan 0-1.		G Moore 0-6, I Byrne 0-5, D O'Keeffe 0-4, S Barron 1-0, N Murphy 1-0, S O'Gorman 1-0, B Carton 0-2, J Guiney 0-2, C Hughes 0-1, C Clince 0-1.	Referee: D Hughes (Carlow)

Third round

15 May 2010 Third round	Westmeath	0-14 - 0-16	Offaly	Cusack Park, Ennis
	A Clarke 0-9, D Fennell 0-1, N O'Brien 0-1, J Boyle 0-1, A Price 0-1, A Craig 0-1.		S Quirke 0-9, A Hynes 0-3, S Cleary 0-3, A Kealey 0-1.	Referee: S Cleere (Kilkenny)

15 May 2010 Third round	Carlow	2-14 - 0-22	Dublin	Dr. Cullen Park, Carlow
	A McDonald 2-0, J Doyle 0-5, P Shaw 0-4, D Roberts 0-2, D Dalton 0-1, R Smithers 0-1, P Coady 0-1.		D Flood 0-8, D Sutcliffe 0-5, J Hetherton 0-3, N Maguire 0-2, C Moffat 0-1, A Clabby 0-1, D Forde 0-1, G Whelan 0-1.	Referee: A Lagrue (Kildare)

Semi-finals

26 June 2010 Semi-final	Dublin	1-16 - 1-15	Wexford	Parnell Park, Dublin
	J Hetherton (1-4), D Flood (0-6), C Kilkenny (0-2), G Whelan (0-2), F Heavey (0-1), D Forde (0-1).	(report)	G Moore (1-5), I Byrne (0-6), D O'Keeffe (0-2), C Hughes (0-1), S Barron (0-1).	Referee: S Cleere (Kilkenny)

27 June 2010 Semi-final	Offaly	1-13 - 2-22	Kilkenny	O'Connor Park, Tullamore
	S Quirke (0-7), B Murphy (1-1), S McKelvey (0-1), A Kelly (0-1), A Hynes (0-1), T Carroll (0-1), P Murphy (0-1).	(report)	J Power (1-4), G Aylward (1-2), K Kelly (0-4), C Buckley (0-3), P Walsh (0-3), O Walsh (0-2), T O'Hanrahan (0-2), D Waugh (0-1), M Brennan (0-1).	Referee: P Murphy (Carlow)

Final

4 July 2010 Final	Kilkenny	1-20 - 0-10	Dublin	Croke Park, Dublin
	J Power (0-8), G Aylward (0-5), K Kelly (0-3), T O'Hanrahan (1-0), E McGrath (0-1), O Walsh (0-1), C Buckley (0-1), P Walsh (0-1).	(report)	J Hetherton (0-5), C Kilkenny (0-2), G Whelan (0-1), D Flood (0-1), D Forde (0-1).	Referee: A Lagrue (Kildare)

=== Munster Minor Hurling Championship ===
First round

28 April 2010 First round	Waterford	1-21 - 0-16	Clare	Walsh Park, Waterford
	P Mahony (0-7), S Roche (0-4), C Heffernan (1-0), P Prendergast (0-3), J Dillon (0-3), E Murphy (0-3), E Madigan (0-1).	(report)	N Arthur (0-10), A Cunningham (0-1), P Collins (0-1), D O'Halloran (0-1), D McInerney (0-1), C Galvin (0-1), P Flanagan (0-1).	Referee: C Lyons (Cork)

28 April 2010 First round	Limerick	2-13 - 1-13	Kerry	FitzGerald Park, Kilmallock
	M Ryan 1-5, J Fitzgibbon 0-4, D Morrissey 1-0, S Dowling 0-2, J Aherne 0-1, J Mulcahy 0-1.		S Dunne 0-6, P Boyle 1-1, B Brennan 0-4, S Weir 0-1.	Referee: D Fox (Clare)

28 April 2010 First round	Cork	2-31 - 4-22 (aet)	Tipperary	Páirc Uí Chaoimh, Cork
	B Hartnett 1-14, C Lehane 0-6, J Coughlan 1-0, S Moore 0-3, D Sweetnam 0-2, J Wall 0-2, S O'Keeffe 0-2, N Kelly 0-1, M Howard 0-1.		L McGrath 0-10, A McCormack 3-0, C Horan 1-2, M O'Brien 0-4, N O'Meara 0-3, D McCormack 0-1, D Butler 0-1, D Stapleton 0-1.	Referee: M O'Connor (Limerick)

Quarter-final

1 May 2010 Quarter-final	Clare	1-21 - 2-07	Kerry	Cusack Park, Ennis
	N Arthur 0-9, A Cunningham 1-4, D O'Halloran 0-2, T Kelly 0-2, C Galvin 0-1, P Collins 0-1, A Mulready 0-1, C Malone 0-1.		S Dunne 1-3, C McCarthy 1-0, B Brosnan 0-2, P Boyle 0-1, M Delaney 0-1.	Referee: G O'Connell (Cork)

Playoff

5 May 2010 Playoff	Clare	0-17 - 1-13	Tipperary	Cusack Park, Ennis
	N Arthur (0-7), P Collins (0-4), T Kelly (0-2), D O'Halloran (0-2), E Boyce (0-1), J Shanahan (0-1).	(report)	L McGrath (1-3), A McCormack (0-2), M O'Brien (0-2), C Horan (0-1), D Butler (0-1), D Flynn (0-1), J Forde (0-1), T Heffernan (0-1), J Cahill (0-1).	Referee: D O'Driscoll (Limerick)

Semi-finals

25 June 2010 Semi-final	Limerick	2-12 - 1-17	Clare	Gaelic Grounds, Limerick
	D Hannon (0-6), S Dowling (1-2), M Ryan (1-0), J Fitzgibbon (0-3), S Kelly (0-1).	(report)	N Arthur (0-8), D O'Halloran (1-1), P Collins (0-3), J Shanahan (0-2), T Kelly (0-2), D Keane (0-1).	Referee: D Copps (Cork)

26 June 2010 Semi-final	Cork	0-24 - 2-18	Waterford	Páirc Uí Chaoimh, Cork
	B Hartnett (0-6), C Lehane (0-6), J Coughlan (0-3), N Kelly (0-3), D Lordan (0-1), K Hallissey (0-1), S Moore (0-1), B Murray (0-1), D Sweetman (0-1), R O'Shea (0-1).	(report)	P O'Mahony (1-13), E Murphy (1-0), M O'Neill (0-2), J Dillon (0-2), C Chester (0-1).	Referee: T. Ryan (Tipperary)

7 July 2010 Semi-final replay	Waterford	2-17 - 0-13	Cork	Walsh Park, Waterford
	P Mahony (0-6), J Dillon (1-2), E Murphy (0-4), E Madigan (1-0), M O’Neill (0-2), P Prendergast (0-2), C Curran (0-1).	(report)	B Hartnett (0-8), C Lehane (1-2), J Coughlan (0-2), D Sweetman (0-1).	Referee: S. Roche (Tipperary)

Final

11 July 2010 Final	Clare	1-16 - 1-11	Waterford	Semple Stadium, Thurles
	D O'Halloran (1-3), N Arthur (0-6), D Keane (0-3), T Kelly (0-2), S O'Halloran (0-1), J Shanahan (0-1).	(report)	E Murphy (1-2), P Mahoney (0-4), P Prendergast (0-1), J Dillon (0-1), S Roche (0-1), C Heffernan (0-1), C Curran (0-1).	Referee: D Copps (Cork)

=== Ulster Minor Hurling Championship ===
First round

8 May 2010 First round	Fermanagh	0-15 - 0-07	Monaghan	Brewster Park, Enniskillen

Second round

22 May 2010 Second round	Armagh	7-15 - 0-09	Tyrone	Oliver Plunkett Park, Crossmaglen

22 May 2010 Second round	Donegal	3-14 - 1-10	Fermanagh	O'Donnell Park, Letterkenny

Quarter-finals

29 May 2010 Quarter-final	Donegal	0-07 - 1-17	Down	Casement Park, Belfast
	B Tourish 0-6, M O'Reilly 0-1.		D Toner 1-2, E Conway 0-5, D McGlinchey 0-2, C Bailie 0-2, N Torney 0-2, E McMullan 0-2, L McMullan 0-1, R Miskelly 0-1.

30 May 2010 Quarter-final	Armagh	4-15 - 2-13	Derry	Casement Park, Belfast
	C Corvan 1-8, C McKee 2-1, C McNally 0-5, M Garvey 1-0, P Heaney 0-1.		S Ferris 1-2, N McGuigan 1-1, C Convery 0-2, B Óg McGilligan 0-2, R Craig 0-2, O O'Docherty 0-2, A Armstrong 0-1, R Farren 0-1.

Semi-final

13 June 2010 Semi-final	Armagh	0-13 - 0-09	Down	Casement Park, Belfast

Final

27 June 2010 Final	Antrim	2-19 - 0-10	Armagh	Casement Park, Belfast
	C Clarke (2-10), C McGuinness (0-3), D McCloskey (0-3), S Jennings (0-3).	(report)	C Corvan (0-7), J King (0-2), C McNally (0-1).	Referee: J O'Rourke (Monaghan)

=== All-Ireland Minor Hurling Championship ===
Quarter-finals

24 July 2010 Quarter-final	Dublin	3-13 - 1-11	Antrim	Oliver Plunkett Park, Crossmaglen
	C Costello (2-1), F Heavey (1-1), D Flood (0-3), C Moffat (0-3), B Quinn (0-1), E Ó Conghaile (0-1), J Hetherton (0-1), N Maguire (0-1), N Ryan (0-1).	Report	C Clarke (0-6), D McCloskey (1-1), C McCann (0-2), J Black (0-1), C McGuinness (0-1).	Referee: A Kelly (Galway)

25 July 2010 Quarter-final	Galway	1-15 - 2-08	Waterford	Croke Park, Dublin
	S Moloney (0-6), J Glynn (1-0), N Keary (0-2), C Cooney (0-2), A Mullins (0-2), P Brehony (0-1), J Flynn (0-1), T Moran (0-1).	(report)	J Dillon (2-0), P Mahony (0-3), E Murphy (0-2), G O'Brien (0-1), S Roche (0-1), MF O'Neill (0-1).	Referee: G Duffy (Antrim)

Semi-finals

8 August 2010 Semi-final	Kilkenny	5-19 - 0-15	Galway	Croke Park, Dublin
	G Aylward (1-5), K Kelly (1-2), J Power (1-2), C Buckley (1-1), P Walsh (0-4), M Brennan (1-0), T O'Hanrahan (0-3), O McGrath (0-2).	(report)	S Moloney (0-5), C Cooney (0-4), P Brehony (0-1), A Mullins (0-1), J Flynn (0-1), Daithí Burke (0-1), C O'Brien (0-1), K Cullinane (0-1).	Referee: D Copps (Cork)

15 August 2010 Semi-final	Clare	0-20 - 2-13	Dublin	Croke Park, Dublin
	N Arthur 0-8 (4f); D Keane 0-3; T Kelly, A Cunningham 0-2 each; C Galvin, C Malone, P Collins, J Shanahan, D O’Halloran 0-1 each	Report	C Costello, E O Conghaile 1-1 each; D Flood 0-4 (3f); C Kilkenny 0-3; J Hetherton 0-2 (2f); G Whelan, R Hardy 0-1 each	Referee: E Hassen (Derry)

Final

5 September 2010 Final	Kilkenny	2–10 - 0–14	Clare	Croke Park, Dublin
	M Brennan 1-2; P Buggy 1-0; O McGrath (two frees), K Kelly, J Power (one free) 0-2 each; G Aylward, C Buckley 0-1 each	Report	D O’Halloran 0-5 (three frees); T Kelly, P Collins, N Arthur (two frees) 0-2 each; D Keane, E Boyce, A Cunningham 0-1 each	Referee: A Stapleton (Laois)

== Championship statistics ==
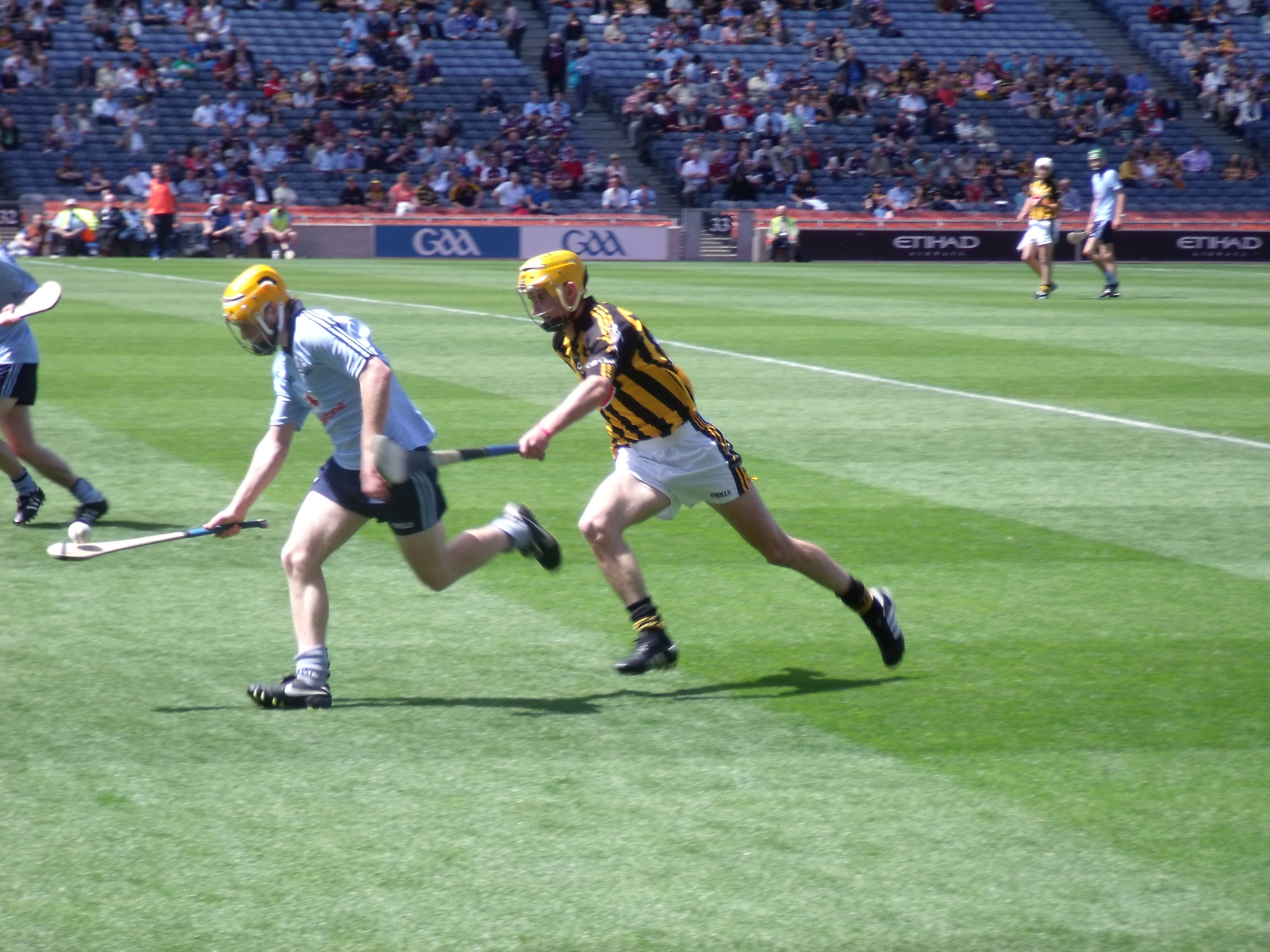
Action from the Leinster final (Dublin v. Kilkenny, 4 July 2010, Croke Park)

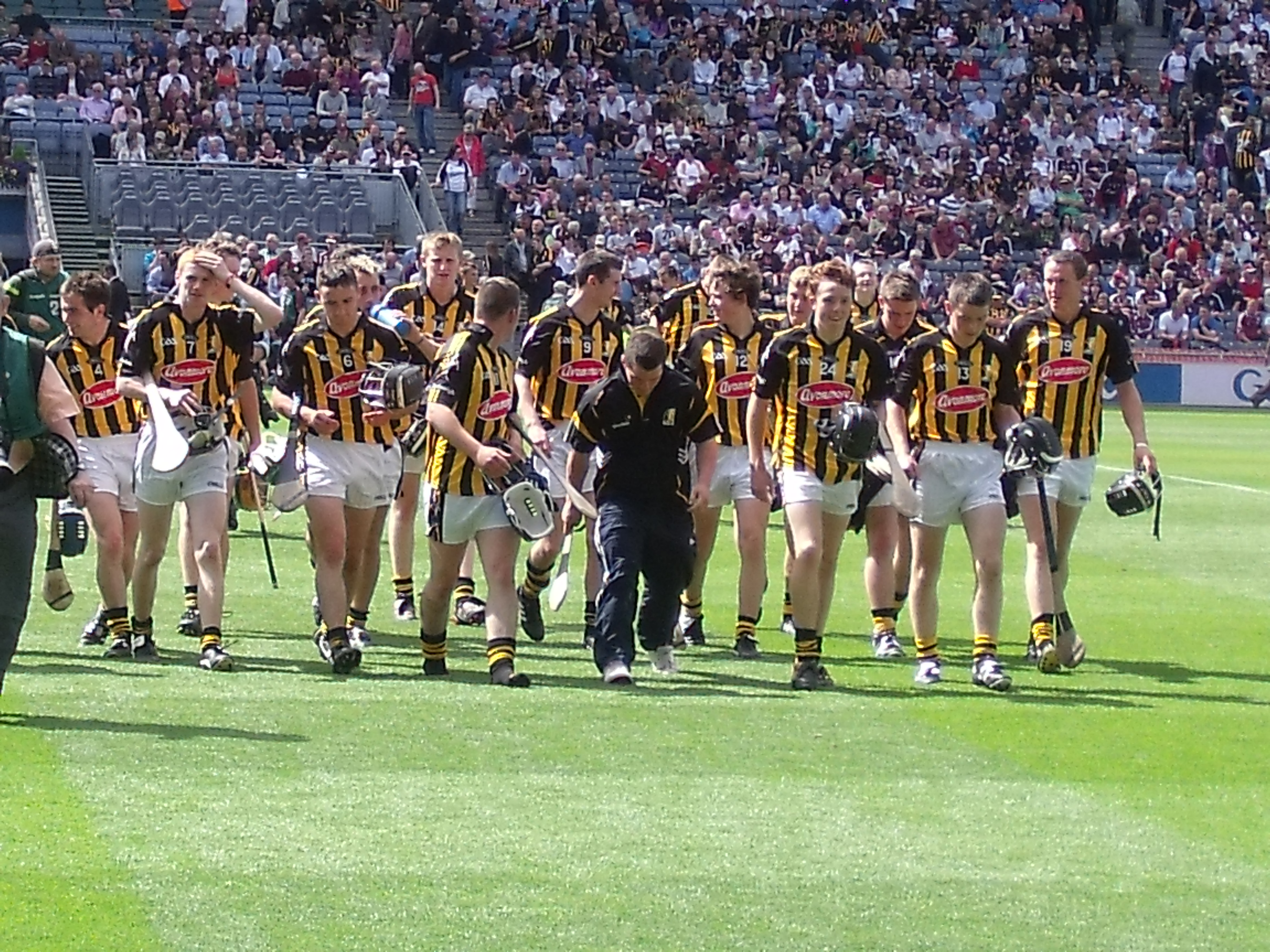
All-Ireland champions Kilkenny.

=== Top scorers ===
Top scorers overall

Rank	Player	Club	Tally	Total	Matches	Average
1	Niall Arthur	Clare	0-50	50	7	7.14
2	Pauric Mahony	Waterford	1-33	36	5	7.20
3	Brian Hartnett	Cork	1-28	31	3	10.33
4	Aonghus Clarke	Westmeath	1-26	29	3	9.66
5	Ger Aylward	Kilkenny	3-17	26	5	5.20
6	Dean Flood	Dublin	0-25	25	6	4.16
7	John Power	Kilkenny	2-17	23	5	4.60
8	Ciarán Clarke	Antrim	2-16	22	2	11.00
9	David O'Halloran	Clare	2-15	21	7	3.00
10	John Hetherton	Dublin	1-16	19	6	3.16

Top scorers in a single game

Rank	Player	Club	Tally	Total	Opposition
1	Brian Hartnett	Cork	1-14	17	Tipperary
2	Ciarán Clarke	Antrim	2-10	16	Tipperary
2	Pauric Mahony	Waterford	1-13	16	Cork
4	Aonghus Clarke	Westmeath	1-10	13	Meath
5	Niall Arthur	Clare	0-10	10	Waterford
5	Liam McGrath	Tipperary	0-10	10	Cork
7	Aidan McCormack	Tipperary	3-00	9	Cork
7	Thomas Carroll	Offaly	1-06	9	Wexford
7	Aonghus Clarke	Westmeath	0-09	9	Offaly
7	Stephen Quirke	Offaly	0-09	9	Westmeath
7	Niall Arthur	Clare	0-09	9	Kerry

=== Miscellaneous ===
- Armagh qualified for their first Ulster final proper since 1965.
- Clare qualified for their first Munster final since 1989.
- Clare's appearance in the All-Ireland final was only their third ever and their first since 1997.
