= Niall Arthur =

Irish hurler

Niall artur
Personal information
- Native name: Niall Mac Artúir (Irish)
- Born: 1992 (age 33–34) Inagh, County Clare, Ireland
- Occupation: Primary school teacher

Sport
- Sport: Hurling
- Position: Full-forward
Clubs
- Years: Club
- Inagh-Kilnamona; O'Tooles; St Oliver Plunketts/Eoghan Ruadh; Inniskeen Grattans
College
- Years: College
- St. Patrick's College
College titles
- Fitzgibbon titles: 0
Inter-county
- Years: County
- 2018 2023: Louth; Monaghan
Inter-county titles
- Leinster titles: 0
- All-Irelands: 0
- NHL: 0
- All Stars: 0

Niall Arthur (born 1992) is an Irish hurler. At club level he plays with Inniskeen Grattans, having earlier played with Inagh-Kilnamona, O'Tooles and St Oliver Plunketts/Eoghan Ruadh, while he has also played at senior inter-county level with Louth and Monaghan.

== Career ==
Arthur first played hurling to a high standard as a student at St. Flannan's College in Ennis, where he lined out on the Harty Cup team. He later lined out in the Fitzgibbon Cup while studying at St. Patrick's College in Drumcondra.

After beginning his club career with Inagh-Kilnamona in Clare, Arthur later transferred to the O'Tooles club in Dublin. He later spent a period of time playing with St Oliver Plunketts/Eoghan Ruadh before once again transferring to the Inniskeen Grattans club in Monaghan.

Arthur first appeared on the inter-county scene with Clare as a member of the minor team that lost the 2010 All-Ireland minor final to Kilkenny. He was also the team's top scorer that year with 0-50. Arthur progressed to the under-21 team and won back-to-back All-Ireland U21HC medals in 2012 and 2013.

Arthur never played for the Clare senior team, but declared for Louth in 2018. He declared for Monaghan in 2023 and was part of the team that won the Lory Meagher Cup that year.

== Career statistics ==
As of match played 18 May 2024

Team	Year	National League			Rackard Cup		Total	
Team	Year	Division	Apps	Score	Apps	Score	Apps	Score
Louth	2018	Division 3A	5	7-50	0	0-00	5	7-50
Monaghan	2023	Division 3A	2	0-06	5	1-59	7	1-65
Monaghan	2024	Division 3A	4	0-26	5	0-47	9	0-73
Total			11	7-82	10	1-106	21	8-188

== Honours ==
Clare

- All-Ireland Under-21 Hurling Championship: 2012, 2013
- Munster Under-21 Hurling Championship: 2012, 2013
- Munster Minor Hurling Championship: 2010

Monaghan

- Lory Meagher Cup: 2023
