= John Hetherton =

Irish hurler

Personal information
- Native name: Seán Ó hArrachtáin (Irish)
- Nickname: Hedgo
- Born: 1992 (age 33–34) Marino, Dublin, Ireland
- Occupation: Garda
- Height: 6 ft 5 in (196 cm)

Sport
- Sport: Hurling
- Position: Full-forward
Club
- Years: Club
- St. Vincent's
Club titles
- Dublin titles: 0
College
- Years: College
- Garda College
College titles
- Fitzgibbon titles: 0
Inter-county*
Years	County	Apps (scores)
2015-present	Dublin	18 (3-17)
Inter-county titles
- Leinster titles: 0
- All-Irelands: 0
- NHL: 0
- All Stars: 0
- *Inter County team apps and scores correct as of 10:57, 24 June 2026.

John Hetherton (born 1992) is an Irish hurler who plays for Dublin Senior Championship club St. Vincent's and at inter-county level with the Dublin senior hurling team. He usually lines out as a forward.

== Career ==
A member of the St. Vincent's club in Marino, Hetherton first came to prominence on the inter-county scene with the Dublin minor team in 2010. He subsequently lined out at under-21 level, while his performances with the Garda College in the Fitzgibbon Cup earned inclusion on the 2017 Team of the Year. Hetherton joined the Dublin senior hurling team in 2015.

== Career statistics ==
As of 20 June 2026

Team	Year	National League			Leinster		All-Ireland		Total	
Team	Year	Division	Apps	Score	Apps	Score	Apps	Score	Apps	Score
Dublin	2015	Division 1A	0	0-00	0	0-00	0	0-00	0	0-00
Dublin	2016	Division 1A	0	0-00	0	0-00	0	0-00	0	0-00
Dublin	2017	Division 1A	0	0-00	1	0-02	1	0-01	2	0-03
Dublin	2018	Division 1B	1	0-01	0	0-00	—		1	0-01
Dublin	2019	Division 1B	7	0-11	1	0-00	1	0-00	9	0-11
Dublin	2020	Division 1B	4	0-02	0	0-00	0	0-00	4	0-02
Dublin	2021	Division 1B	3	0-02	0	0-00	0	0-00	3	0-02
Dublin	2022	Division 1B	0	0-00	0	0-00	—		0	0-00
Dublin	2023	Division 1B	—		—		—		—	
Dublin	2024	Division 1B	—		—		—		—	
Dublin	2025	Division 1B	5	0-04	5	2-05	2	1-01	12	3-10
Dublin	2026	Division 1B	5	5-08	6	0-08	1	0-00	12	5-16
Total			25	5-28	13	2-15	5	1-02	43	8-45

== Honours ==
Dublin

- Walsh Cup (2): 2016, 2022
