= 2013 All-Ireland Under-21 Hurling Championship =

All-Ireland Under-21 Hurling Championship 2012
Championship Details
- Dates: 31 May – 14 September 2012
- Teams: 18

All Ireland Champions
- Winners: Clare (3rd win)
- Captain: Paul Flanagan
- Manager: Gerry O'Connor; Donal Moloney

All Ireland Runners-up
- Runners-up: Antrim
- Captain: Jackson McGreevy
- Manager: Kevin Ryan

Provincial Champions
- Munster: Clare
- Leinster: Wexford
- Ulster: Antrim
- Connacht: Not Played

Championship Statistics
- Matches Played: 15
- Total Goals: 43 (2.866 per game)
- Total Points: 434 (28.93 per game)
- Top Scorer: Jason Forde (5-25)

The All-Ireland Under-21 Hurling Championship 2013 was the 50th staging of the All-Ireland championship since its establishment in 1964. The draw for the 2013 fixtures took place in October 2012. The championship began 31 May 2013 and ended on 14 September 2013.

Clare were the defending champions and retained their title after defeating Antrim 2-28 to 012 in the final.

== Fixtures ==
=== Leinster Under-21 Hurling Championship ===
2 June 2013 Quarter-final	Wexford	1-15 - 1-10	Westmeath	Wexford Park
15:30	L Chin 1-0, J Guiney (2fs), G Moore (1sl), I Byrne (1 65, 2f) 0-3 each, C O'Leary, J Hobbs 0-2 each, D Wright, R Clarke 0-1 each.		N O'Brien 1-8fs, R Greville, N Leonard 0-1 each.	Referee: M Flynn (Kilkenny)

5 June 2013 Quarter-final	Laois	2-15 - 2-16	Offaly	O'Moore Park
19:30	S Maher 0-10 (6f), P J Scully 1-1, B Conroy 1-0, R King 0-2, P Keating, P Purcell 0-1 each.		S Quirke 1-9 (6f), A Hynes 1-0, S Cleary, T Craroll, P Geraghty 0-2 each, T Geraghty 0-1.	Referee: P Burke (Kilkenny)

11 June 2013 Quarter-final	Dublin	1-11 - 1-13	Carlow	Parnell Park
	A Clabby 0-4f, D Sutcliffe 0-3, E Dillon 1-0, G Whelan 0-2, J Desmond (0-1f), T Devlin 0-1 each.	Report	M Kavanagh 1-3 (0-3f), JM Nolan 0-4, J Doyle, D Dalton 0-2 each, D Roberts, J Corcoran 0-1 each.

26 June 2013 Semi-final	Carlow	0-9 - 1-12	Wexford	Dr. Cullen Park
19:30	M Kavanagh (0-5 fs), S Murphy (0-2), D Byrne (0-1), J Doyle (0-1).	Report	I Byrne (1-6, 3fs), G Moore (0-2 sls), R Clarke (0-2, 1f), B Carton (0-1), N Murphy (0-1).	Referee: G Quilty (Kilkenny)

26 June 2013 Semi-final	Offaly	1-13 - 1-19	Kilkenny	O'Connor Park
19:30	S Quirke 1-10 (1-6fs), T Geraghty 0-2, A Kealey 0-1.	Report	J Power 0-10 (6fs, 3, '65), K Kelly 0-4, M Brennan 1-1, C Buckley, R Reid, S Donnelly, G Aylward 0-1 each.	Referee: J Heffernan (Wexford)

11 July 2013 Final	Wexford	1-21 - 0-21	Kilkenny	Wexford Park
19:30	J Guiney (0-9, 9f), I Byrne (0-5, 3f, 1 '65), N Murphy (1-0), C McDonald (0-2), R Clarke (0-2), L Chin (0-1), G Moore (0-1), B Carton (0-1).	Report	J Power (0-9, 8f), K Kelly (0-7, 4f), R Reid (0-3), G Aylward (0-2).	Referee: P Murphy (carlow)

Quarter-final
Wexford	1-15
Westmeath	1-10
Dublin	1-11
Carlow	1-13
Laois	2-15
Offaly	2-16

Semi-finals
Wexford	1-12
Carlow	0-9
Kilkenny	1-19
Offaly	1-13

Leinster final
Wexford	1-21
Kilkenny	0-21

=== Munster Under-21 Hurling Championship ===
31 May 2013 Quarter-final	Tipperary	2-18 - 2-11	Limerick	Semple Stadium
	J Forde 1-8 (0-4f, 0-1 pen), A McCormack 1-3, D McCormack & B Stapleton 0-2 each, N O'Meara, B Walsh and L McGrath 0-1 each.	Report	S Dowling 0-5 (3f), S Kenny 1-1, M Ryan 1-0, D Hannon 0-2, K O'Donnell 0-2 (1f), D Reidy 0-1.	Referee: C Lyons (Cork)

17 July 2013 Semi-final	Cork	2-13 - 5-19	Tipperary	Semple Stadium
	M Sugrue (1-1); J Coughlan (0-4, three frees, one 65); C Buckley (1-0); R O’Shea (0-3); B Murray (0-2); C Joyce, C Lehane, J Wall (0-1 each).	Report	J Forde (2-8, six frees, 1-0 pen); B Walsh (2-1); N O’Meara (0-4); T Heffernan (1-0); L McGrath (0-2); J Cahill, B Stapleton, A McCormack, J McGrath (0-1 each).	Referee: S Hourigan (Limerick)

18 July 2013 Semi-final	Waterford	0-17 - 2-15	Clare	Walsh Park
	J. Dillon 0-13 (0-11 fs); D. Breathnach, C. Curran, S. Roche and P. Mahony (f) 0-1 each.	Report	C. O’Connell 0-6 (0-4 fs); A. Cunningham and S. Morey 1-0 each; A. O’Neill 0-2 (fs); D. Keane, P. Collins, S. O’Halloran, D. O’Halloran, J. Shanahan, C. Galvin, P. Duggan (sideline) 0-1 each.	Attendance: 2,288; Referee: J Ryan (Tipperary)

7 August 2013 Final	Tipperary	2-10 - 1-17	Clare	Semple Stadium
19:30	J Forde 2-7 (1-0 pen, 0-6fs, 0-1 '65'), L McGrath 0-2 (1f), N O'Meara 0-1.	Report	C O'Connell 0-8 (6fs), P Duggan 1-0, C Galvin, T Kelly, P Collins, A Cunningham 0-2 each, S O'Donnell 0-1.	Attendance: 8,296; Referee: S Hourigan (Limerick)

Quarter-final
Limerick	2-11
Tipperary	2-18

Semi-finals
Waterford	0-17
Clare	2-15
Cork	2-13
Tipperary	5-19

Munster final
Clare	1-17
Tipperary	2-10

=== Ulster Under-21 Hurling Championship ===
10 July 2013 Quarter-final	Tyrone	scr. - w/o.	Armagh

17 July 2013 Semi-final	Derry	2-13 - 1-13	Armagh	Owenbeg
19:30	T McCloskey (0-8, 0-5 frees, 0-1 65), N Ferris (1-1), J O'Dwyer (1-1), B Rodgers (0-1), A Armstrong (0-1)), T Hendry (0-1).	Report	M Lennon (1-6, 0-4 frees, 0-1 65), G McKeown (0-2), P Heaney (0-2), R Fullerton (0-1), S Gaffney (0-1).	Referee: C Cunning (Antrim)

17 July 2013 Semi-final	Antrim	1-17 - 1-14	Down	Casement Park
19:30	C Clarke (0-8), C McCann (1-0), C Johnson (0-3), S Beatty (0-2), J McGreevy (0-1), E Campbell (0-1), D McKiernan (0-1), S McAfee (0-1).	Report	D Toner (1-11), J McGrath (0-1), C Egan (0-1), M Nicholson (0-1).	Referee: B Sweeney (Cavan)

24 July 2013 Final	Antrim	6-22 - 0-6	Derry	Casement Park
19:30	S McAfee (3-1), D McKernan (1-7), C Clarke (2-1), J McGreevy (0-4), C McCann (0-3, 2f), N McKenna (0-2), C McGuinness (0-2), S Beatty (0-1), M Bradley (0-1).	Report	(0-2, 1f, 1 65), N Ferris (0-2), B Rodgers (0-1), D Mullan (0-1).	Referee: P Braniff (Down)

Quarter-final
Armagh	w/o.
Tyrone	scr.

Semi-finals
Down	1-14
Antrim	1-17
Derry	2-13
Armagh	1-13

Ulster final
Antrim	6-22
Derry	0-6

=== All-Ireland Under-21 Hurling Championship ===
24 August 2013 Semi-final	Wexford	1-16 - 2-15	Antrim	Semple Stadium
16:00	J Guiney (0-7, 6f), C McDonald (1-1), G Moore, I Byrne (2f), R Clarke (0-2 each), L Chin, B Carton (0-1 each).	Report	C Clarke (1-5, 5fs), S McAfee (1-4), J McGreevey, N McKenna (0-2 each), C Johnson, D McKernan (0-1 each).	Referee: C McAllister (Cork)

24 August 2013 Semi-final	Galway	0-7 - 1-16	Clare	Semple Stadium
18:00	C Cooney (1f); C Mannion (0-3 each); S Maloney (0-1).	Report	C O’Connell (1-6, 5fs), D O’Halloran (0-3), P Collins, C Malone (0-2 each), S O’Donnell, P Duggan, S Morey (0-1 each).	Referee: D Kirwan (Cork)

14 September 2013 Final	Antrim	0-12 - 2-28	Clare	Semple Stadium
17:00	C Clarke (0-06, 4f, 1sl), C McGuinness (0-01), J McGreevey (0-01), S McAfee (0-01), N McKenna (0-01, 1f), C McCann (0-01), M Bradley (0-01).	Report	C O'Connell (0-11, 10f), D O'Halloran (1-04), S O'Donnell (1-00), C Galvin (0-03), T Kelly (0-03), C Malone (0-02), S Morey (0-02), A O'Neill (0-01, 1f), J Colleran (0-01), E Boyce (0-01).	Attendance: 11,148; Referee: C Lyons (Cork)

== Championship statistics ==
=== Miscellaneous ===
- Wexford won the Leinster title for the first time since 2002.
- Clare retained the Munster crown for the first time in their history.
- After losing thirty-two All-Ireland semi-finals, Antrim finally triumphed and qualified for their first ever All-Ireland decider. The final saw the second ever meeting between Antrim and Clare. Clare won the game and retained the All-Ireland title for the first time in their history.

== Top scorers ==
=== Championship ===
Rank	Player	County	Tally	Total	Matches	Average
1	Jason Forde	Tipperary	5-25	40	3	13.32
2	Cathal O'Connell	Clare	1-31	34	4	8.5
3	Ciarán Clarke	Antrim	3-20	29	4	7.25
4	Stephen Quirke	Offaly	2-19	25	2	12.50
5	Stephen McAfee	Antrim	4-07	19	4	4.75
5	Ian Byrne	Wexford	1-16	19	4	4.75
5	Jack Guiney	Wexford	0-19	19	4	4.75
5	John Power	Kilkenny	0-19	19	2	9.50
9	Daniel Toner	Down	1-11	14	1	14.00
10	Jake Dillon	Waterford	0-13	13	1	13.00

=== Single game ===
Rank	Player	County	Tally	Total	Opposition
1	Jason Forde	Tipperary	2-08	14	Cork
1	Daniel Toner	Down	1-11	14	Antrim
3	Jason Forde	Tipperary	2-07	13	Clare
3	Stephen Quirke	Offaly	1-10	13	Kilkenny
3	Jake Dillon	Waterford	0-13	13	Clare
6	Stephen Quirke	Offaly	1-09	12	Laois
7	Jason Forde	Tipperary	1-08	11	Limerick
7	Niall O'Brien	Westmeath	1-08	11	Wexford
9	Stephen McAfee	Antrim	3-01	10	Derry
9	Daniel McKernan	Antrim	1-07	10	Derry
9	Stephen Maher	Laois	0-10	10	Offaly
9	John Power	Kilkenny	0-10	10	Offaly
