= Jackson McGreevy =

Irish hurler

Personal information
- Native name: Mac Siacais Mag Riabhaigh (Irish)
- Born: 21 April 1994 (age 32) Belfast, Northern Ireland
- Occupation: Student

Sport
- Sport: Hurling
- Position: Midfield
Club
- Years: Club
- St Gall's
Club titles
- Antrim titles: 0
Inter-county*
Years	County	Apps (scores)
2013-	Antrim	3 (0-5)
Inter-county titles
- Leinster titles: 0
- All-Irelands: 0
- NHL: 0
- All Stars: 0
- *Inter County team apps and scores correct as of 23:18, 15 September 2013.

Jackson McGreevy (born 21 April 1994) is an Irish hurler who plays as a midfielder for the Antrim senior team.

Born in Belfast, McGreevy first played competitive hurling whilst at school in St Mary's CBGS. He arrived on the inter-county scene at the age of seventeen when he first linked up with the Antrim minor team, before later lining out with the under-21 side. He made his senior debut in the 2013 National Hurling League. McGreevy has since gone on to be a regular member of the team, however, he has yet to claim any silverware.

At club level McGreevy plays with St Gall's.

== Honours ==
=== Team ===
St. Mary's CBGS

- O'Keeffe Cup (1): 2012

Antrim

- Ulster Under-21 Hurling Championship (1): 2013 (c)
- Ulster Minor Hurling Championship (1): 2011

Sporting positions
Preceded by Conor McCann	Antrim Under-21 Hurling Captain; 2013	Incumbent
