= Stephen Quirke (hurler) =

Irish hurler

Personal information
- Native name: Stiofán Ó Coirc (Irish)
- Born: 1992 (age 33–34) Banagher, Offaly

Sport
- Sport: Hurling
- Position: Full forward
Club
- Years: Club
- St. Rynagh's
Club titles
- Offaly titles: 2
College
- Years: College
- University College Dublin
College titles
- Fitzgibbon titles: 0
Inter-county*
Years	County	Apps (scores)
2014-2017	Offaly	3 (0-01)
Inter-county titles
- Leinster titles: 0
- All-Irelands: 0
- NHL: 0
- All Stars: 0
- *Inter County team apps and scores correct as of 20:45, 9 July 2021.

Stephen Quirke (born 1992) is an Irish hurler who plays for Offaly Senior Championship club St. Rynagh's. He is a former member of the Offaly senior hurling team, with whom he usually lined out as a forward.

== Career ==
Quirke first came to prominence at juvenile and underage levels with the St. Rynagh's club in Banagher. He eventually joined the club's senior team and has since won two County Championship titles. Quirke first appeared on the inter-county scene during a two-year stint with the Offaly minor team, before later lining out with the under-21 team. He also played with University College Dublin in the Fitzgibbon Cup. Quirke joined the Offaly senior hurling team in 2014 and continued to line out until leaving the panel in 2017.

== Honours ==
St. Rynagh's

- Offaly Senior Hurling Championship: 2016, 2019
