= Munster Senior Hurling Championship records and statistics =

This page details statistics of the Munster Senior Hurling Championship.

== General performances ==
=== Performance by county ===
County	Title(s)	Runners-up	Years won	Years runner-up
Cork	55	31	1888, 1890, 1892, 1893, 1894, 1901, 1902, 1903, 1904, 1905, 1907, 1912, 1915, 1919, 1920, 1926, 1927, 1928, 1929, 1931, 1939, 1942, 1943, 1944, 1946, 1947, 1952, 1953, 1954, 1956, 1966, 1969, 1970, 1972, 1975, 1976, 1977, 1978, 1979, 1982, 1983, 1984, 1985, 1986, 1990, 1992, 1999, 2000, 2003, 2005, 2006, 2014, 2017, 2018, 2025	1896, 1897, 1898, 1906, 1909, 1910, 1913, 1914, 1916, 1921, 1932, 1940, 1941, 1948, 1950, 1951, 1957, 1959, 1960, 1961, 1964, 1965, 1968, 1980, 1987, 1988, 1991, 2004, 2010, 2013, 2026
Tipperary	42	28	1895, 1896, 1898, 1899, 1900, 1906, 1908, 1909, 1913, 1916, 1917, 1922, 1924, 1925, 1930, 1937, 1941, 1945, 1949, 1950, 1951, 1958, 1960, 1961, 1962, 1964, 1965, 1967, 1968, 1971, 1987, 1988, 1989, 1991, 1993, 2001, 2008, 2009, 2011, 2012, 2015, 2016	1894, 1904, 1907, 1911, 1912, 1923, 1926, 1935, 1936, 1942, 1952, 1953, 1954, 1963, 1969, 1970, 1973, 1984, 1985, 1990, 1996, 1997, 2000, 2002, 2005, 2006, 2019, 2021
Limerick	26	28	1897, 1910, 1911, 1918, 1921, 1923, 1933, 1934, 1935, 1936, 1940, 1955, 1973, 1974, 1980, 1981, 1994, 1996, 2013, 2019, 2020, 2021, 2022, 2023, 2024,2026	1891, 1893, 1895, 1902, 1905, 1917, 1919, 1920, 1922, 1924, 1937, 1939, 1944, 1945, 1946, 1947, 1949, 1956, 1971, 1975, 1976, 1979, 1992, 1995, 2001, 2007, 2014, 2025,
Waterford	9	21	1938, 1948, 1957, 1959, 1963, 2002, 2004, 2007, 2010	1903, 1925, 1929, 1931, 1933, 1934, 1943, 1958, 1962, 1966, 1982, 1983, 1989, 1998, 2003, 2009, 2011, 2012, 2015, 2016, 2020
Clare	6	25	1889, 1914, 1932, 1995, 1997, 1998	1899, 1901, 1915, 1918, 1927, 1928, 1930, 1938, 1955, 1967, 1972, 1974, 1977, 1978, 1981, 1986, 1993, 1994, 1999, 2008, 2017, 2018, 2022, 2023, 2024
Kerry	1	5	1891	1889, 1890, 1900, 1892, 1908

== Counties ==
=== By Semi-Final/Top 4 Appearances (since 2015) ===
Team	No.	Years
Limerick	12	2015, 2016, 2017, 2018, 2019, 2020, 2021, 2022, 2023, 2024, 2025, 2026
Cork	11	2015, 2017, 2018, 2019, 2020, 2021, 2022, 2023, 2024, 2025, 2026
Clare	10	2016, 2017, 2018, 2019, 2021, 2022, 2023, 2024, 2025, 2026
Tipperary	8	2015, 2016, 2018, 2019, 2020, 2021, 2023, 2025
Waterford	7	2015, 2016, 2017, 2020, 2022, 2024, 2026

== Other records ==
=== By decade ===
The most successful team of each decade, judged by number of Munster Senior Hurling Championship titles, is as follows:

- 1890s: 4 each for Cork (1890-92-93-94) and Tipperary (1895-96-98-99)
- 1900s: 6 for Cork (1901-02-03-04-05-07)
- 1910s: 3 each for Limerick (1910-11-18), Cork (1912-15-19) and Tipperary (1913-16-17)
- 1920s: 5 for Cork (1920-26-27-28-29)
- 1930s: 4 for Limerick (1933-34-35-36)
- 1940s: 5 for Cork (1942-43-44-46-47)
- 1950s: 4 for Cork (1952-53-54-56)
- 1960s: 7 for Tipperary (1960-61-62-64-65-67-68)
- 1970s: 7 for Cork (1970-72-75-76-77-78-79)
- 1980s: 5 for Cork (1982-83-84-85-86)
- 1990s: 3 each for Clare (1995-97-98) and Cork (1990-92-99)
- 2000s: 4 for Cork (2000-03-05-06)
- 2010s: 4 for Tipperary (2011-12-15-16)
- 2020s: 6 for Limerick (2020-21-22-23-24-26)

=== Finishing positions ===
- Most championships
  - 56, Cork (1888, 1890, 1892, 1893, 1894, 1901, 1902, 1903, 1904, 1905, 1907, 1912, 1915, 1919, 1920, 1926, 1927, 1928, 1929, 1931, 1939, 1942, 1943, 1944, 1946, 1947, 1952, 1953, 1954, 1956, 1966, 1969, 1970, 1972, 1975, 1976, 1977, 1978, 1979, 1982, 1983, 1984, 1985, 1986, 1990, 1992, 1999, 2000, 2003, 2005, 2006, 2014, 2017, 2018, 2025, 2026)
- Most second-place finishes
  - 30, Cork (1896, 1897, 1898, 1906, 1909, 1910, 1913, 1914, 1916, 1921, 1932, 1940, 1941, 1948, 1950, 1951, 1957, 1959, 1960, 1961, 1964, 1965, 1968, 1980, 1987, 1988, 1991, 2004, 2010, 2013)
- Most third-place finishes
  - 3, Cork (2019, 2022, 2024)
- Most fourth-place finishes
  - 3, Waterford (2022, 2024, 2026)
- Most fifth-place finishes
  - 4, Waterford (2018, 2019, 2023, 2025)

=== Other records ===
==== Biggest wins ====
- The most one sided Munster finals since 1896 when goals were made equal to three points:
  - 31 points – 1918: Limerick 11-03 – 1-02 Clare
  - 31 points – 1982: Cork 5-31 – 3-06 Waterford
  - 28 points – 1893: Cork 5-13 – 0-00 Limerick
  - 27 points – 1903: Cork 5-16 – 1-01 Waterford
  - 26 points – 1905: Cork 7-12 – 1-04 Limerick
  - 23 points – 1899: Tipperary 5-16 – 0-08 Clare
  - 22 points – 1900: Tipperary 6-11 – 2-01 Kerry
  - 22 points – 1972: Cork 6-18 – 2-08 Clare
  - 21 points – 2016: Tipperary 5-19 (34) – (13 0-13 Waterford
  - 21 points – 1896: Tipperary 7-09 – 2-03 Cork
  - 21 points – 2011: Tipperary 7-19 – 0-19 Waterford
  - 20 points – 1962: Tipperary 5-14 – 2-03 Waterford
  - 19 points – 1915: Cork 8-02 – 2-01 Clare
  - 19 points – 1983: Cork 3-22 – 0-12 Waterford
  - 18 points – 1993: Tipperary 3-27 – 2-12 Clare
  - 18 points – 1965: Tipperary 4-11 – 0-05 Cork
- The most one sided games from the semi-final and quarter-final stages of the championship:
  - 42 points – 1923: Cork 13-04 – 0-01 Waterford
  - 41 points – 1904: Tipperary 8-21 – 0-04 Waterford
  - 34 points – 2000: Cork 2-32 – 0-04 Kerry
  - 34 points – 1953: Clare 10-08 – 1-01 Limerick
  - 32 points – 1960: Tipperary 10-09 – 2-01 Limerick

==== Successful defending ====
Only 4 teams of the 6 who have won the Munster championship have ever successfully defended the title. These are:

- Cork on 27 attempts out of 50 (1893, 1894, 1902, 1903, 1904, 1905, 1920, 1927, 1928, 1929, 1943, 1944, 1947, 1953, 1954, 1970, 1976, 1977, 1978, 1979, 1983, 1984, 1985, 1986, 2000, 2006, 2018)
- Tipperary on 16 attempts out of 40 (1896, 1899, 1900, 1909, 1917, 1925, 1950, 1951, 1961, 1962, 1965, 1968, 1988, 1989, 2009, 2012)
- Limerick on 11 attempts out of 24 (1911, 1934, 1935, 1936, 1974, 1981, 2020, 2021, 2022, 2023, 2024)
- Clare on 1 attempt out of 6 (1998)

The most consecutive titles is 6 in a row, achieved by just one county:

- Limerick in 2019–24

==== Gaps ====
- Top ten longest gaps between successive Munster titles:
  - 63 years: Clare (1932-1995)
  - 39 years: Waterford (1963-2002)
  - 25 years: Clare (1889-1914)
  - 18 years: Limerick (1955-1973)
  - 18 years: Clare (1914-1932)
  - 17 years: Limerick (1996-2013)
  - 16 years: Tipperary (1971-1987)
  - 15 years: Limerick (1940-1955)
  - 13 years: Limerick (1981-1994)
  - 13 years: Limerick (1897-1910)
- Top ten longest gaps between successive Munster finals:
  - 22 years: Waterford (1903-1925)
  - 18 years: Clare (1938-1955)
  - 16 years: Waterford (1966-1982)
  - 15 years: Limerick (1956-1971)
  - 13 years: Clare (1901-1914)
  - 12 years: Clare (1955-1967)
  - 11 years: Tipperary (1973-1984)
  - 11 years: Limerick (1981-1992)
  - 10 years: Clare (1889-1899)
  - 10 years: Limerick (1924-1934)

==== Active Gaps ====
- Longest active gaps since last title:
  - 135 years: Kerry (1891–)
  - 28 years: Clare (1998–)
  - 16 years: Waterford (2010–)
  - 10 years: Tipperary (2016–)
  - 2 years: Limerick (2024–)
  - 1 year: Cork (2025–)
- Longest active gaps since last championship final appearance:
  - 118 years: Kerry (1908–)
  - 6 years: Waterford (2020–)
  - 5 years: Tipperary (2021–)
  - 2 years: Clare (2024–)
- Longest active gap since last championship appearance:
  - 57 years: Galway (1969–)
  - 22 years: Kerry (2004–)

=== Munster final pairings ===
Pairing	Meetings	First meeting	Last meeting
Cork v Tipperary	34	1894	2006
Cork v Limerick	23	1893	2026
Limerick v Tipperary	17	1895	2021
Clare v Cork	14	1888	2018
Cork v Waterford	13	1903	2010
Tipperary v Waterford	9	1925	2016
Clare v Limerick	9	1918	2024
Clare v Tipperary	6	1899	2008
Limerick v Waterford	4	1933	2020
Clare v Waterford	2	1938	1998
Kerry v Cork	2	1890	1892
Kerry v Tipperary	2	1900	1908
Clare v Kerry	1	1889	
Kerry v Limerick	1	1891	

==== Longest undefeated run ====
- Cork (15 matches): Cork's run began with a 1-19 to 2-8 win against Tipperary in the quarter-final of the 1982 championship and finished with a 1-18 apiece draw with Tipperary in the Munster final of the 1987 championship. The 15-game unbeaten streak, which included just one drawn game, ended with a 4-22 to 1-22 extra-time loss to Tipperary in the replay of the 1987 Munster final.
- Limerick (15 matches): As of 11 June 2023, Limerick are currently unbeaten in 15 Munster Championship games, a run that started in the 2019 Munster Final on 30 June 2019.

== Players ==
=== Top scorers ===
==== All time ====
This is a list of players who have scored a cumulative total of 100 points or more in the Munster Championship.

As of 12 June 2024
Pos.	Name	Team	Goals	Points	Total
1	Patrick Horgan	Cork	18	320	374
2	Christy Ring	Cork	29	146	233
3	Aaron Gillane	Limerick	10	184	214
4	Eoin Kelly	Tipperary	12	177	213
5	Tony Kelly	Clare	7	167	188
6	Paul Flynn	Waterford	19	120	177
7	Jimmy Doyle	Tipperary	16	125	173
8	Jason Forde	Tipperary	8	148	172
9	Charlie McCarthy	Cork	22	103	169
10	Gary Kirby	Limerick	7	139	160
11	Mick Mackey	Limerick	30	61	151
12	Éamonn Cregan	Limerick	24	78	150
13	Séamus Callanan	Tipperary	16	97	145
14	Joe Deane	Cork	6	114	132
15	Peter Duggan	Clare	5	112	124
16	Nicky English	Tipperary	14	77	119
17	Tony O'Sullivan	Cork	1	115	118
18	John Fenton	Cork	5	102	117
19	Jimmy Smyth	Clare	20	53	113
20	Ben O'Connor	Cork	6	91	109
21	Richie Bennis	Limerick	8	84	108
22	Pat Fox	Tipperary	6	86	104
23	Michael Cleary	Tipperary	8	79	103
23	Shane Dowling	Limerick	3	94	103
25	Jimmy Kennedy	Cork	33	3	102

==== By year ====
Year	Name	Team	Score	Total
1937	Dave Clohessy	Limerick	5-02	17
1938	Locky Byrne	Waterford	3-00	9
1939	Paddy McMahon	Limerick	6-00	18
1940	Ted O'Sullivan	Cork	8-00	24
1941	Jack Lynch	Cork	3-09	18
1942	Johnny Quirke	Cork	4-01	13
1943	Ted O'Sullivan	Cork	4-00	12
1944	Dick Stokes	Limerick	3-15	24
1945	Mutt Ryan	Tipperary	2-05	11
1946	Christy Ring	Cork	0-12	12
1947	Christy Ring	Cork	3-14	23
1948	Jackie Power	Limerick	4-00	12
1949	Jimmy Kennedy	Tipperary	2-31	37
1950	Jimmy Kennedy	Tipperary	4-19	31
1951	Christy Ring	Cork	1-08	11
1952	Liam Dowling	Cork	3-03	12
1953	Jimmy Smyth	Clare	6-04	22
1954	Séamus Power	Waterford	5-03	18
1955	Dermot Kelly	Limerick	1-12	15
1956	Christy Ring	Cork	4-08	20
1957	Liam Skelly	Tipperary	4-02	14
1958	Jimmy Doyle	Tipperary	1-12	15
1959	Frankie Walsh	Waterford	2-14	20
1960	Jimmy Doyle	Tipperary	5-17	32
1961	Christy Ring	Cork	3-08	17
1962	Jimmy Doyle	Tipperary	4-20	32
1963	Phil Grimes	Waterford	1-11	14
1964	Jimmy Doyle	Tipperary	1-17	20
1965	John Bennett	Cork	1-10	13
1966	Seánie Barry	Cork	3-19	28
1967	Pat Cronin	Clare	2-18	24
1968	Charlie McCarthy	Cork	1-11	14
1969	Charlie McCarthy	Cork	5-07	22
1970	Pat Cronin	Clare	1-09	12
1971	Richie Bennis	Limerick	2-25	31
1972	Charlie McCarthy	Cork	3-25	34
1973	Francis Loughnane	Tipperary	3-19	28
1974	Richie Bennis	Limerick	3-14	23
1975	Richie Bennis	Limerick	1-21	24
1976	Éamonn Cregan	Limerick	6-02	20
1977	Colm Honan	Clare	1-14	17
1978	Colm Honan	Clare	0-15	15
1979	Éamonn Cregan	Limerick	2-17	23
1980	Éamonn Cregan	Limerick	3-11	20
1981	Joe McKenna	Limerick	7-06	27
1982	Tony O'Sullivan	Cork	0-26	26
1983	Jimmy Barry-Murphy; John Grogan	Tipperary	2-10; 1-13	16
1984	John Fenton	Cork	1-14	17
1985	John Fenton	Cork	2-11	17
1986	Cyril Lyons; Tommy Guilfoyle	Clare	0-12; 3-03	12
1987	Pat Fox	Tipperary	1-44	47
1988	Pat Horgan	Cork	2-10	16
1989	Nicky English	Tipperary	2-18	24
1990	Kevin Hennessy	Cork	4-06	18
1991	Michael Cleary	Tipperary	1-20	23
1992	Tony O'Sullivan	Cork	0-23	23
1993	Michael Cleary	Tipperary	4-06	18
1994	Gary Kirby	Limerick	3-21	30
1995	Gary Kirby	Limerick	0-18	18
1996	Gary Kirby	Limerick	1-24	27
1997	Jamesie O'Connor	Clare	0-17	17
1998	Paul Flynn	Waterford	1-22	25
1999	Tommy Dunne	Tipperary	0-24	24
2000	Joe Deane	Cork	1-18	21
2001	Paul O'Grady	Limerick	0-17	17
2002	Eoin Kelly	Tipperary	2-24	30
2003	Paul Flynn	Waterford	6-16	34
2004	Dan Shanahan	Waterford	6-04	22
2005	Eoin Kelly	Tipperary	0-27	27
2006	Eoin Kelly	Tipperary	2-30	36
2007	Andrew O'Shaughnessy	Limerick	0-21	21
2008	Eoin Kelly; Niall Gilligan	Tipperary; Clare	1-13	16
2009	Eoin Kelly	Waterford	1-22	25
2010	Eoin Kelly	Waterford	1-22	25
2011	Eoin Kelly	Tipperary	4-16	28
2012	Pa Bourke	Tipperary	1-22	25
2013	Declan Hannon	Limerick	0-17	17
2014	Patrick Horgan	Cork	2-41	47
2015	Shane Dowling	Limerick	1-18	21
2016	Séamus Callanan	Tipperary	2-25	31
2017	Patrick Horgan	Cork	0-27	27
2018	Peter Duggan	Clare	2-49	55
2019	Aaron Gillane	Limerick	2-41	47
2020	Aaron Gillane	Limerick	2-28	34
2021	Tony Kelly	Clare	2-21	27
2022	Tony Kelly	Clare	1-46	49
2023	Patrick Horgan	Cork	2-39	45
2024	Patrick Horgan	Cork	3-37	49

==== Single game ====
Year	Top scorer	Team	Score	Total
1937	Paddy McMahon	Limerick	4-00	12
1938	Jimmy Coffey	Tipperary	2-02	8
1939	Ted O'Sullivan	Cork	3-00	9
1939	Paddy McMahon	Limerick	3-00	9
1940	Ted O'Sullivan	Cork	4-00	12
1941	Jack Lynch	Cork	2-05	11
1942	Johnny Quirke	Cork	3-00	9
1943	Ted O'Sullivan	Cork	4-00	12
1944	Dick Stokes	Limerick	2-05	11
1945	Jackie Solon	Clare	2-01	7
1945	Tommy Doyle	Tipperary	1-04	7
1946	John Mackey	Limerick	2-01	7
1947	Christy Ring	Cork	2-07	13
1948	Jackie Power	Limerick	3-00	9
1948	Willie McAllister	Clare	3-00	9
1949	Jimmy Kennedy	Tipperary	0-11	11
1950	Jimmy Kennedy	Tipperary	3-06	15
1951	Jimmy Smyth	Clare	3-01	10
1952	Josie Hartnett	Cork	2-02	8
1952	Séamus Bannon	Tipperary	2-02	8
1953	Jimmy Smyth	Clare	6-04	22
1954	Séamus Power	Waterford	4-02	14
1955	Dermot Kelly	Limerick	1-12	15
1956	Mick Ryan	Cork	2-02	8
1956	Terry Kelly	Cork	2-02	8
1957	Liam Skelly	Tipperary	4-00	12
1958	Christy Ring	Cork	2-04	10
1959	Christy Ring	Cork	1-08	11
1960	Donie Nealon	Tipperary	3-04	13
1961	Christy Ring	Cork	3-04	13
1962	Jimmy Doyle	Tipperary	1-10	13
1963	Jimmy Smyth	Clare	1-07	10
1964	Richard Browne	Cork	4-00	12
1965	Frank Coffey	Galway	1-06	9
1966	Éamonn Cregan	Limerick	3-05	14
1967	Michael Keating	Tipperary	3-02	11
1968	Jimmy Doyle	Tipperary	0-07	7
1969	Jimmy Doyle	Tipperary	1-08	11
1970	Pat Cronin	Clare	1-08	11
1971	Michael Keating	Tipperary	3-04	13
1972	Charlie McCarthy	Cork	2-09	15
1973	Francis Loughnane	Tipperary	2-10	16
1974	Richie Bennis	Limerick	2-08	14
1975	Michael Keating	Tipperary	2-03	9
1975	Richie Bennis	Limerick	1-06	9
1975	Richie Bennis	Limerick	0-09	9
1976	Éamonn Cregan	Limerick	4-01	13
1977	Éamonn Cregan	Limerick	1-06	9
1978	Willie Fitzmaurice	Limerick	3-00	9
1978	Colm Honan	Clare	0-09	9
1979	Éamonn Cregan	Limerick	2-04	10
1979	Joe McKenna	Limerick	2-04	10
1980	Éamonn Cregan	Limerick	2-05	11
1981	Joe McKenna	Limerick	3-03	12
1981	John Grogan	Tipperary	2-06	12
1982	Seánie O'Leary	Cork	4-00	12
1983	John Grogan	Tipperary	1-06	9
1984	John Fenton	Cork	1-07	10
1985	Séamus Power	Tipperary	2-05	11
1986	Tommy Guilfoyle	Clare	2-02	8
1986	John Fenton	Cork	0-08	8
1987	Pat Fox	Tipperary	1-10	13
1988	Pat Horgan	Cork	1-06	9
1988	Nicky English	Tipperary	0-09	9
1989	Joe Hennessy	Kerry	3-04	13
1989	Finbarr Delaney	Cork	1-11	13
1990	Mark Foley	Cork	2-07	13
1991	Michael Cleary	Tipperary	1-07	10
1991	Gary Kirby	Limerick	0-10	10
1992	Gary Kirby	Limerick	1-08	11
1993	Michael Cleary	Tipperary	3-02	11
1994	Gary Kirby	Limerick	2-05	11
1995	Gary Kirby	Limerick	0-12	12
1996	Gary Kirby	Limerick	1-07	10
1996	Gary Kirby	Limerick	0-10	10
1997	Paul Flynn	Waterford	1-07	10
1998	Paul Flynn	Waterford	0-10	10
1999	Paul Flynn	Waterford	1-08	11
2000	Joe Deane	Cork	0-10	10
2001	Jamesie O'Connor	Clare	1-04	7
2001	Jamesie O'Connor	Clare	0-07	7
2001	Eoin Kelly	Tipperary	0-07	7
2001	Paul O'Grady	Limerick	0-07	7
2002	Paul Flynn	Waterford	0-12	12
2002	Eoin Kelly	Tipperary	0-12	12
2003	Paul Flynn	Waterford	3-03	12
2004	Eoin Kelly	Tipperary	2-08	14
2005	T. J. Ryan	Limerick	1-07	10
2006	Eoin Kelly	Tipperary	2-09	15
2007	Dan Shanahan	Waterford	3-03	12
2008	Eoin Kelly	Tipperary	1-07	10
2008	Mark Flaherty	Clare	1-07	10
2008	Dave Bennett	Waterford	0-10	10
2009	Eoin Kelly	Waterford	0-12	12
2009	Colin Ryan	Clare	0-12	12
2010	Eoin Kelly	Waterford	1-08	11
2011	Lar Corbett	Tipperary	4-04	16
2012	Pa Bourke	Tipperary	0-12	12
2013	Declan Hannon	Limerick	0-09	9
2014	Patrick Horgan	Cork	2-11	17
2015	Maurice Shanahan	Waterford	1-09	12
2016	Séamus Callanan	Tipperary	1-11	14
2017	Patrick Horgan	Cork	0-13	13
2018	Jason Forde	Tipperary	1-14	17
2019	Patrick Horgan	Cork	2-09	15
2020	Tony Kelly	Clare	0-17	17
2021	Tony Kelly	Clare	1-12	15
2022	Tony Kelly	Clare	0-16	16
2023	Patrick Horgan	Cork	1-14	17
2024	Patrick Horgan	Cork	2-10	16

==== Finals ====
Year	Top scorer	Team	Score	Total
1932	Tull Considine	Clare	3-01	10
1933	Mick Mackey	Limerick	2-01	7
1934	Mick Mackey	Limerick	1-07	10
1935	Dave Clohessy	Limerick	2-00	6
1936	Mick Mackey	Limerick	5-03	18
1937	Paddy Ryan	Tipperary	2-01	7
1938	Mick Hennessy	Clare	1-01	4
1939	Ted O'Sullivan	Cork	3-00	9
1939	Jim McCarthy	Limerick	3-00	9
1940	Paddy McMahon (D)	Limerick	3-00	9
1940	Paddy McMahon (R)	Limerick	2-00	6
1941	Bill O'Donnell	Tipperary	2-03	9
1942	Christy Ring	Cork	0-08	8
1943	Christy Ring	Cork	1-03	6
1944	Mick Mackey (D)	Limerick	2-04	10
1944	John Mackey (R)	Limerick	2-00	6
1944	Jim Morrison (R)	Cork	2-00	6
1945	Mutt Ryan	Tipperary	1-03	6
1946	Christy Ring	Cork	0-05	5
1947	Dick Stokes	Limerick	1-03	6
1948	Christy Ring	Cork	1-04	7
1949	Jimmy Kennedy	Tipperary	0-11	11
1950	Jimmy Kennedy	Tipperary	0-10	10
1951	Christy Ring	Cork	1-04	7
1953	Liam Dowling	Cork	1-03	6
1954	Christy Ring	Cork	1-08	11
1954	Christy Ring	Cork	1-05	8
1955	Dermot Kelly	Limerick	1-12	15
1956	Terry Kelly	Cork	2-02	8
1957	Phil Grimes	Waterford	0-06	6
1958	Liam Connolly	Tipperary	2-01	7
1959	John Kiely	Waterford	2-02	8
1959	Christy Ring	Cork	1-05	8
1960	Jimmy Doyle	Tipperary	1-08	11
1961	Liam Devaney	Tipperary	1-01	4
1961	Christy Ring	Cork	0-04	4
1962	Jimmy Doyle	Tipperary	1-10	13
1963	Phil Grimes	Waterford	0-08	8
1964	Jimmy Doyle	Tipperary	0-10	10
1965	Theo English	Tipperary	2-01	7
1965	Jimmy Doyle	Tipperary	0-07	7
1966	Seánie Barry	Cork	1-06	9
1967	Michael Keating	Tipperary	3-02	11
1968	Michael Keating	Tipperary	1-03	6
1969	Willie Walsh	Cork	3-00	9
1970	Francis Loughnane	Tipperary	1-04	7
1971	Michael Keating	Tipperary	3-04	13
1972	Charlie McCarthy	Cork	2-09	15
1973	Francis Loughnane	Tipperary	2-10	16
1974	Richie Bennis	Limerick	2-08	14
1975	Charlie McCarthy	Cork	1-05	8
1976	Éamonn Cregan	Limerick	4-01	13
1977	Colm Honan	Clare	1-05	8
1978	Colm Honan	Clare	0-06	6
1979	Charlie McCarthy	Cork	1-04	7
1980	Éamonn Cregan	Limerick	1-06	9
1981	Joe McKenna	Limerick	3-03	12
1982	Seánie O'Leary	Cork	4-00	12
1983	Jimmy Barry-Murphy	Cork	1-05	8
1984	Séamus Power	Tipperary	1-06	9
1985	Nicky English	Tipperary	2-03	9
1985	John Fenton	Cork	1-06	9
1986	Tommy Guilfoyle	Clare	2-02	8
1986	John Fenton	Cork	0-08	8
1987	John Fenton (D)	Cork	0-12	12
1987	John Fenton (R)	Cork	0-13	13
1988	Nicky English	Tipperary	0-09	9
1989	Nicky English	Tipperary	0-13	13
1990	Mark Foley	Cork	2-07	13
1991	Michael Cleary (D)	Tipperary	0-08	8
1991	Michael Cleary (R)	Tipperary	1-07	10
1992	Gary Kirby	Limerick	1-08	11
1993	Michael Cleary	Tipperary	1-04	7
1994	Gary Kirby	Limerick	0-09	9
1995	Gary Kirby	Limerick	0-06	6
1995	Jamesie O'Connor	Clare	0-06	6
1996	Gary Kirby (D)	Limerick	0-10	10
1996	Michael Cleary (R)	Tipperary	0-07	7
1997	Tommy Dunne	Tipperary	0-07	7
1998	Anthony Kirwan (D)	Waterford	2-01	7
1998	Jamesie O'Connor (D)	Clare	0-07	7
1998	Niall Gilligan (R)	Clare	1-01	4
1998	Seánie McMahon (R)	Clare	0-04	4
1998	Jamesie O'Connor (R)	Clare	0-04	4
1998	Paul Flynn (R)	Waterford	0-04	4
1999	Joe Deane	Cork	1-04	7
2000	Joe Deane	Cork	0-10	10
2001	Seán O'Connor	Limerick	1-03	6
2002	Paul Flynn	Waterford	1-06	9
2003	John Mullane	Waterford	3-01	10
2004	Paul Flynn	Waterford	1-07	10
2005	Paul Kelly	Tipperary	0-07	7
2006	Joe Deane	Cork	0-08	8
2007	Dan Shanahan	Waterford	3-03	12
2008	Niall Gilligan	Clare	0-08	8
2009	Eoin Kelly	Waterford	1-07	10
2010	Eoin Kelly (D)	Waterford	1-08	11
2010	Eoin Kelly (R)	Waterford	0-08	8
2010	Ben O'Connor (R)	Cork	1-05	8
2011	Lar Corbett	Tipperary	4-04	16
2012	Maurice Shanahan	Waterford	0-08	8
2013	Declan Hannon	Limerick	0-08	8
2014	Shane Dowling	Limerick	0-12	12
2015	Maurice Shanahan	Waterford	0-08	8
2016	Séamus Callanan	Tipperary	1-11	14
2017	Patrick Horgan	Cork	0-13	13
2018	Patrick Horgan	Cork	0-11	11
2019	Peter Casey	Limerick	1-05	8
2020	Stephen Bennett	Waterford	0-12	12
2021	Jason Forde	Tipperary	0-11	11
2022	Tony Kelly	Clare	0-13	13
2023	Aaron Gillane	Limerick	1-11	14
2024	Aidan McCarthy	Clare	0-08	8
2025	Aaron Gillane	Limerick	0-09	9
2026	Aidan O'Connor	Limerick	0-08	8

=== All-time appearances ===
Rank	Player	Team	Appearances	Year
1	Christy Ring	Cork	49	1940-1963

=== Munster final appearances ===
Rank	Player	Team	Appearances	Finals
1	Christy Ring	Cork	18	1940, 1940 (R), 1941, 1942, 1943, 1944, 1946, 1947, 1948, 1950, 1951, 1952, 1953, 1954, 1956, 1959, 1960, 1961
2	John Doyle	Tipperary	14	1949, 1950, 1951, 1952, 1953, 1954, 1958, 1960, 1961, 1962, 1963, 1964, 1965, 1967
3	Jimmy Doyle	Tipperary	11	1958, 1960, 1961, 1962, 1963, 1964, 1965, 1967, 1968, 1969, 1971
3	Charlie McCarthy	Cork	11	1966, 1968, 1969, 1970, 1972, 1975, 1976, 1977, 1978, 1979, 1980
3	Jimmy Barry-Murphy	Cork	11	1975, 1976, 1977, 1978, 1979, 1980, 1982, 1983, 1984, 1985, 1986

=== Munster medal winners ===
Rank	Player	Team	No.	Years
1	John Doyle	Tipperary	10	1949, 1950, 1951, 1958, 1960, 1961, 1962, 1964, 1965, 1967
1	Jimmy Barry-Murphy	Cork	10	1975, 1976, 1977, 1978, 1979, 1982, 1983, 1984, 1985, 1986
3	Christy Ring	Cork	9	1942, 1943, 1944, 1946, 1947, 1952, 1953, 1954, 1956
3	Jimmy Doyle	Tipperary	9	1958, 1960, 1961, 1962, 1964, 1965, 1967, 1968, 1971
3	Charlie McCarthy	Cork	9	1966, 1969, 1970, 1972, 1975, 1976, 1977, 1978, 1979
3	Gerald McCarthy	Cork	9	1966, 1969, 1970, 1972, 1975, 1976, 1977, 1978, 1979
3	Ray Cummins	Cork	9	1969, 1970, 1972, 1975, 1976, 1977, 1978, 1979, 1982
3	Johnny Crowley	Cork	9	1976, 1977, 1978, 1979, 1982, 1983, 1984, 1985, 1986
9	Donie Nealon	Tipperary	8	1958, 1960, 1961, 1962, 1964, 1965, 1967, 1968
9	Tom Cashman	Cork	8	1977, 1978, 1979, 1982, 1983, 1984, 1985, 1986
9	Dermot McCurtain	Cork	8	1977, 1978, 1979, 1982, 1983, 1984, 1985, 1986
9	Nickie Quaid	Limerick	8	2013, 2019, 2020, 2021, 2022, 2023, 2024, 2026
9	David Reidy	Limerick	8	2013, 2019, 2020, 2021, 2022, 2023, 2024, 2026

=== Other records ===
- Winners of Munster medals on the field of play in each of three decades:
  - Paddy Ahern of Cork: 1919, 1920, 1926, 1927, 1928, 1929, 1931
  - Tommy Doyle of Tipperary: 1937, 1942, 1945, 1949, 1950, 1951
  - Jimmy Doyle of Tipperary: 1958, 1960, 1961, 1962, 1964, 1965, 1967, 1968, 1971
  - Ray Cummins of Cork: 1969, 1970, 1972, 1975, 1976, 1977, 1978, 1979, 1982
  - Declan Ryan of Tipperary: 1988, 1989, 1991, 1993, 2001

== Matches ==
=== Attendances ===
==== Overall ====
Year	Total	Average
2010	119,630	23,926
2011	100,145	20,029
2012	93,370	23,342
2013	93,394	23,348
2014	127,765	25,553
2015	117,112	29,278
2016	100,868	25,217
2017	127,992	31,998
2018	248,809	22,619
2019	280,688	25,517
2020	–	–
2021	–	–
2022	261,755	23,796

==== Finals ====
Year	Attendance
2006	53,286
2007	48,371
2008	48,077
2009	40,330
2010	22,763
2011	36,654
2012	26,438
2013	42,730
2014	36,075
2015	43,084
2016	26,508
2017	45,558
2018	45,364
2019	44,052
2020	0
2021	7,000
2022	45,690
2023	43,756

== See also ==
- All-Ireland Senior Hurling Championship records and statistics
- Leinster Senior Hurling Championship records and statistics
