= Cork–Limerick hurling rivalry =

Irish hurling rivalry

Cork-Limerick
- Location: County Cork; County Limerick
- Teams: Cork; Limerick
- First meeting: Cork 4-8 - 0-00 Limerick; 1893 Munster final (5 November 1893)
- Latest meeting: Limerick 1-21 - 2-17 Cork; 2026 Munster Final (7th June 2026)

Statistics
- Total meetings: 75
- Most player appearances: Christy Ring (11)
- Top scorer: Patrick Horgan (5-80)
- All-time series: Championship: Cork 49-20 Limerick (4 draws)
- Largest victory: Cork 7-12 - 1-4 Limerick; 1905 Munster final (10 February 1907)

The Cork-Limerick rivalry is a hurling rivalry between Irish county teams Cork and Limerick, who first played each other in 1893. Since the turn of the century, it has come to be regarded as one of the biggest rivalries in Gaelic games. Cork's home ground is Páirc Uí Chaoimh and Limerick's home ground is the Gaelic Grounds, with fixtures alternating between the two venues.

While Cork are the standard bearers in Munster, Limerick have enjoyed success at sporadic intervals -they have won just seven All-Ireland titles since 1973 although 6 of these came recently, in 2018, 2020, 2021, 2022, 2023 and 2026. At All-Ireland level Cork are second on the all-time roll of honour with thirty titles, while Limerick rank in fourth position with thirteen All-Ireland titles. On 29 July 2018, the sides met at Croke Park for the first time in the championship in the all Ireland semi-final. The counties met on 22 August 2021 in the all Ireland final, also a first. Limerick were victorious, scoring 3-32 - an all time record.

== Statistics ==
Up to date as of 2026 Munster final

Team	All-Ireland	Provincial	National League	Total
Cork	30	55	15	100
Limerick	12	26	15	53
Combined	42	81	30	153

== Recent results ==
=== Championship ===
Cork win
Limerick win
Drawn game

No.	Date	Winners	Score	Runners-up	Venue	Stage
46	20 July 1980	Limerick (10)	2-14 - 2-10	Cork	Semple Stadium	Munster final
47	26 June 1983	Cork (34)	1-14 - 1-12	Limerick	Páirc Uí Chaoimh	Munster semi-final replay
48	3 June 1984	Cork (35)	3-15 - 2-13	Limerick	Gaelic Grounds	Munster semi-final
49	16 June 1985	Cork (36)	2-13 - 1-9	Limerick	Páirc Uí Chaoimh	Munster semi-final
50	14 June 1987	Cork	3-11 - 3-11	Limerick	Semple Stadium	Munster semi-final
51	28 June 1987	Cork (37)	3-14 - 0-10	Limerick	Semple Stadium	Munster semi-final replay
52	5 July 1992	Cork (38)	1-22 - 3-11	Limerick	Páirc Uí Chaoimh	Munster final
53	5 June 1994	Limerick (11)	4-14 - 4-11	Cork	Gaelic Grounds	Munster quarter-final
54	26 May 1996	Cork (12)	1-8 - 3-18	Limerick	Páirc Uí Chaoimh	Munster quarter-final
55	31 May 1998	Cork (39)	1-20 - 3-11	Limerick	Gaelic Grounds	Munster quarter-final
56	4 June 2000	Cork (40)	2-17 - 1-11	Limerick	Semple Stadium	Munster semi-final
57	27 May 2001	Limerick (13)	1-16 - 1-15	Cork	Páirc Uí Chaoimh	Munster quarter-final
58	29 June 2002	Cork (41)	1-16 - 1-15	Limerick	Semple Stadium	All-Ireland qualifiers
59	30 May 2004	Cork (42)	1-18 - 2-12	Limerick	Gaelic Grounds	Munster semi-final
60	22 July 2006	Cork (43)	0-19 - 0-18	Limerick	Semple Stadium	All-Ireland quarter-final
61	20 June 2010	Cork (44)	2-19 - 0-12	Limerick	Páirc Uí Chaoimh	Munster semi-final
62	14 July 2013	Limerick (14)	0-24 - 0-15	Cork	Gaelic Grounds	Munster final
63	13 July 2014	Cork (45)	2-24 - 0-24	Limerick	Páirc Uí Chaoimh	Munster Final
64	29 July 2018	Limerick (15)	3-32 - 2-31	Cork	Croke Park	All-Ireland Semi Final
65	19 May 2019	Cork (46)	1-26 - 1-19	Limerick	Gaelic Grounds	Munster round 2
66	3 July 2021	Limerick (16)	2-22 - 1-17	Cork	Semple Stadium	Munster Semi Final
67	22 August 2021	Limerick (17)	3-32 - 1-22	Cork	Croke Park	All-Ireland Final
68	17 April 2022	Limerick (18)	2-25 - 1-17	Cork	Páirc Uí Chaoimh	Munster round 1
69	28 May 2023	Limerick (19)	3-25 - 1-30	Cork	Gaelic Grounds	Munster round 5
70	11 May 2024	Cork (47)	3-28 - 3-26	Limerick	Páirc Uí Chaoimh	Munster round 3
71	7 July 2024	Cork (48)	1-28 - 0-29	Limerick	Croke Park	All-Ireland Semi Final
72	18 May 2025	Limerick (20)	3-26 - 1-16	Cork	TUS Gaelic Grounds	Munster round 4
73	7 June 2025	Cork (49)	1-30 - 2-27	Limerick	TUS Gaelic Grounds	Munster Final
74	26 April 2026	Cork (50)	2-22 - 1-23	Limerick	SuperValu Páirc Uí Chaoimh	Munster round 2
75	7 June 2026	Limerick (21)	1-21 - 2-17	Cork	SuperValu Páirc Uí Chaoimh	Munster Final

== Records ==
=== Scorelines ===
- Biggest win:
  - For Cork (26 pts):
    - Cork 7-12 - 1-4 Limerick, Munster quarter-final, Fraher Field, 10 February 1907
  - For Limerick (16pts):
    - Limerick 3-18 - 1-8 Cork, Munster quarter-final, Páirc Uí Chaoimh, 26 May 1996
    - Limerick 3-32 - 1-22 Cork, All-Ireland Final, Croke Park, 22 August 2021
- Highest aggregate (78 pts):
  - Limerick 3-32 - 2-31 Cork, All-Ireland Semi Final, Croke Park, 29 July 2018

=== Top scorers ===
Rank	Player	Team	Score	Total	Appearances
1	Patrick Horgan	Cork	5-80	95	2010, 2013, 2014, 2018, 2018, 2019, 2021, 2021, 2022, 2023
2	Aaron Gillane	Limerick	2-44	50	2018, 2018, 2019, 2021, 2021, 2022, 2023
3	John Fenton	Cork	3-35	44	1975, 1979, 1980, 1983, 1983, 1984, 1985, 1987, 1987
4	Christy Ring	Cork	5-21	36	1940, 1940, 1941, 1942, 1944, 1944, 1946, 1947, 1948, 1952, 1956
5	Éamonn Cregan	Limerick	5-19	34	1966, 1968, 1970, 1971, 1975, 1976, 1979, 1980, 1983, 1983
