= Séamus Power =

Séamus Power may refer to:

- Séamus Power (Waterford hurler) (born 1929), Irish hurler for Mount Sion and Waterford
- Séamus Power (Tipperary hurler) (born 1952), Irish hurler for Boherlahan-Dualla and Tipperary
- Séamus Power (golfer) (born 1987), Irish professional golfer
