= Mutt Ryan =

Irish hurler (1922–1997)

Personal information
- Nickname: Mutt
- Born: Matthew Ryan; 12 July 1915 Littleton; County Tipperary, Ireland
- Died: 17 August 1997 (aged 82) Littleton, County Tipperary, Ireland

Sport
- Sport: Hurling
- Position: Right wing-forward
Club
- Years: Club
- Moycarkey-Borris
Club titles
- Tipperary titles: 2
Inter-county
- Years: County
- 1939–1949: Tipperary
Inter-county titles
- Munster titles: 2
- All-Irelands: 1
- NHL: 1

Matthew Ryan (12 July 1915 – 17 August 1997), known as Mutt Ryan, was an Irish hurler. At club level he played with Moycarkey-Borris, and also lined out at inter-county level with various Tipperary teams.

== Career ==
Ryan first played hurling at club level with Moycarkey-Borris. He progressed to the club's senior team and won three Mid Tipperary SHC titles, as well as Tipperary SHC titles in 1937 and 1940.

Ryan first appeared on the inter-county scene with Tipperary as a member of the junior team in 1939. He was immediately called up to the senior team and won a Munster SHC medal in 1941. Ryan won a second provincial title four years later before claiming an All-Ireland SHC medal after a defeat of Kilkenny in the 1945 final. He added a National Hurling League medal to his collection in 1949, in what was his last game for Tipperary.

== Personal life and death ==
His brothers, Paddy and Johnny Ryan, also claimed All-Ireland SHC medals with Tipperary. Ryan died on 17 August 1997, at the age of 82.

== Honours ==
Moycarkey-Borris

- Tipperary Senior Hurling Championship: 1937, 1940
- Mid Tipperary Senior Hurling Championship: 1937, 1940, 1943

Tipperary

- All-Ireland Senior Hurling Championship: 1945
- Munster Senior Hurling Championship: 1941, 1945
- National Hurling League: 1948–49
