= 2022 All-Ireland Senior Hurling Championship =

Championship details
- Dates: 16 April — 17 July 2022
- Teams: 17

All-Ireland champions
- Winning team: Limerick (11th win)
- Captain: Declan Hannon
- Manager: John Kiely

All-Ireland Finalists
- Losing team: Kilkenny
- Captain: Richie Reid
- Manager: Brian Cody

Provincial champions
- Munster: Limerick
- Leinster: Kilkenny
- Ulster: Not Played
- Connacht: Not Played

Championship statistics
- No. matches played: 34
- Goals total: 48 (3.2 per game)
- Points total: 645 (43 per game)
- Top Scorer: T. J. Reid (2–65)
- All-Star Team: See here

The 2022 All-Ireland Senior Hurling Championship (SHC) was the 135th staging of the All-Ireland Senior Hurling Championship, the Gaelic Athletic Association's premier inter-county hurling tournament, since its establishment in 1887. The provincial fixtures were released on 27 November 2021. The competition began on 16 April 2022 and concluded on 17 July 2022.

Limerick entered the competition as defending champion, having won the two previous editions.

Westmeath, having won the 2021 Joe McDonagh Cup, returned to the Leinster SHC for the first time since the 2017 competition.

The final was played on 17 July 2022 at Croke Park in Dublin, between Limerick and Kilkenny. Defending champion Limerick won the game by 1–31 to 2–26, claiming a first three-in-a-row, as well as a fourth title in five years.

Declan Hannon of Limerick became the first captain to lift the Liam MacCarthy Cup four times.

== Format ==
=== Leinster Championship ===
Participating counties (6): Dublin, Galway, Kilkenny, Laois, Westmeath, Wexford

Group stage (15 matches): Each team plays each other once. The 1st and 2nd placed teams advance to the Leinster final and the 3rd placed team advances to the all-Ireland preliminary quarter-finals. All other teams are eliminated from the championship and the bottom placed team may face relegation to next years Joe McDonagh Cup.

Final (1 match): The top 2 teams in the group stage contest this game. The Leinster champions advance to the All-Ireland semi-finals and the Leinster runners-up advance to the All-Ireland quarter-finals.

=== Munster Championship ===
Participating counties (5): Clare, Cork, Limerick, Tipperary, Waterford

Group stage (10 matches): Each team plays each other once. The 1st and 2nd placed teams advance to the Munster final and the 3rd placed team advances to the all-Ireland preliminary quarter-finals. All other teams are eliminated from the championship and the bottom placed team may face relegation to next years Joe McDonagh Cup.

Final (1 match): The top 2 teams in the group stage contest this game. The Munster champions advance to the All-Ireland semi-finals and the Munster runners-up advance to the All-Ireland quarter-finals.

=== Joe McDonagh Cup ===
Participating counties (6): Antrim, Carlow, Down, Kerry, Meath, Offaly

Group stage (15 matches): Each team plays each other once. The 1st and 2nd placed teams advance to the Joe McDonagh Cup final. All other teams are eliminated from the championship and the bottom placed team are relegated to next years Christy Ring Cup.

Final (1 match): The top 2 teams in the group stage contest this game. The Joe McDonagh Cup champions and runners-up advance to the All-Ireland preliminary quarter-finals.

=== All-Ireland Championship ===
Preliminary quarter-finals (2 matches): The 3rd placed teams from the Leinster and Munster championships play the Joe McDonagh Cup champions and runners-up. Two teams are eliminated at this stage while the winners advance to the quarter-finals.

Quarter-finals (2 matches): The winners of the preliminary quarter-finals join the Leinster and Munster runners-up to make up the quarter-final pairings. Teams who may have already met in the provincial championships are kept apart in separate quarter-finals. Two teams are eliminated at this stage while the winners advance to the semi-finals.

Semi-finals (2 matches): The winners of the quarter-finals join the Leinster and Munster champions to make up the semi-final pairings. Teams who may have already met in the provincial championships are kept apart in separate semi-finals where possible. Two teams are eliminated at this stage while the winners advance to the final.

Final (1 match): The two winners of the semi-finals contest this game.

== Team changes ==
=== To Championship ===
Promoted from the Christy Ring Cup

- Offaly

Included in the Championship

- Carlow
- Down
- Kerry
- Meath
- Westmeath

== Teams ==
=== General information ===
Seventeen counties will compete in the All-Ireland Senior Hurling Championship: six teams in the Leinster Senior Hurling Championship, five teams in the Munster Senior Hurling Championship and six teams in the Joe McDonagh Cup.

| County | Last provincial title | Last championship title | Position in 2021 championship | Current championship |
|---|---|---|---|---|
| Antrim | – | – | Preliminary Round | Joe McDonagh Cup |
| Carlow | – | – | Group Stage (Joe McDonagh Cup) | Joe McDonagh Cup |
| Clare | 1998 | 2013 | Round 2 | Munster Senior Hurling Championship |
| Cork | 2018 | 2005 | Runners-up | Munster Senior Hurling Championship |
| Down | – | – | Group Stage (Joe McDonagh Cup) | Joe McDonagh Cup |
| Dublin | 2013 | 1938 | Quarter-finals | Leinster Senior Hurling Championship |
| Galway | 2018 | 2017 | Round 2 | Leinster Senior Hurling Championship |
| Kerry | 1891 | 1891 | Runners-up (Joe McDonagh Cup) | Joe McDonagh Cup |
| Kilkenny | 2021 | 2015 | Semi-finals | Leinster Senior Hurling Championship |
| Laois | 1949 | 1915 | Round 1 | Leinster Senior Hurling Championship |
| Limerick | 2021 | 2021 | Champions | Munster Senior Hurling Championship |
| Meath | – | – | Group Stage (Joe McDonagh Cup) | Joe McDonagh Cup |
| Offaly | 1995 | 1998 | Champions (Christy Ring Cup) | Joe McDonagh Cup |
| Tipperary | 2016 | 2019 | Quarter-finals | Munster Senior Hurling Championship |
| Waterford | 2010 | 1959 | Semi-finals | Munster Senior Hurling Championship |
| Westmeath | – | – | Champions (Joe McDonagh Cup) | Leinster Senior Hurling Championship |
| Wexford | 2019 | 1996 | Round 1 | Leinster Senior Hurling Championship |

=== Personnel and kits ===
| Team | Manager | Captain(s) | Sponsor |
|---|---|---|---|
| Antrim | Darren Gleeson | Eoghan Campbell | fona CAB |
| Carlow | Tom Mullally | | IT Carlow |
| Clare | Brian Lohan | Tony Kelly | |
| Cork | Kieran Kingston | Mark Coleman, Sean O'Donoghue (v) | |
| Down | Ronan Sheehan | | EOS IT Solutions |
| Dublin | Mattie Kenny | Eoghan O'Donnell, Cian O'Callaghan (v) | |
| Galway | Henry Shefflin | Daithí BurkeJoseph Cooney (v) | |
| Kerry | Stephen Molumphy | Paudie O'Connor | Kerry Group |
| Kilkenny | Brian Cody | Richie ReidEoin Cody (v) | |
| Laois | Séamus Plunkett | Pádraig Delaney; John Lennon | |
| Limerick | John Kiely | Declan Hannon | |
| Meath | Nick Weir | | Glenveagh Properties |
| Offaly | Michael Fennelly | | Glenisk |
| Tipperary | Colm Bonnar | Ronan Maher | |
| Waterford | Liam Cahill | Conor Prunty, Jamie Barron | |
| Westmeath | Joe Fortune | Aonghus ClarkeKillian Doyle | |
| Wexford | Darragh Egan | Lee Chin, Kevin Foley (v) | |

== Summary ==
=== Championships ===
| Level on Pyramid | Competition | Champions | Runners-up |
|---|---|---|---|
| Tier 1 | 2022 All-Ireland Senior Hurling Championship | Limerick | Kilkenny |
| Tier 1 | 2022 Leinster Senior Hurling Championship | Kilkenny | Galway |
| Tier 1 | 2022 Munster Senior Hurling Championship | Limerick | Clare |
| Tier 2 | 2022 Joe McDonagh Cup | Antrim | Kerry |
| Tier 3 | 2022 Christy Ring Cup | Kildare | Mayo |
| Tier 4 | 2022 Nicky Rackard Cup | Tyrone | Roscommon |
| Tier 5 | 2022 Lory Meagher Cup | Louth | Longford |

=== Munster Senior Hurling Championship ===
| Pos | Team | Pld | Pts |
|---|---|---|---|
| 1 | Clare | 4 | 7 |
| 2 | Limerick (C) | 4 | 7 |
| 3 | Cork | 4 | 4 |
| 4 | Waterford | 4 | 2 |
| 5 | Tipperary | 4 | 0 |

=== Leinster Senior Hurling Championship ===
| Pos | Team | Pld | Pts |
|---|---|---|---|
| 1 | Galway | 5 | 9 |
| 2 | Kilkenny (C) | 5 | 6 |
| 3 | Wexford | 5 | 6 |
| 4 | Dublin | 5 | 6 |
| 5 | Westmeath | 5 | 3 |
| 6 | Laois | 5 | 0 |

=== Joe McDonagh Cup ===
| Pos | Team | Pld | Pts |
|---|---|---|---|
| 1 | Antrim (C) | 5 | 8 |
| 2 | Kerry | 5 | 6 |
| 3 | Carlow | 5 | 6 |
| 4 | Offaly | 5 | 6 |
| 5 | Down | 5 | 4 |
| 6 | Meath | 5 | 0 |

=== Christy Ring Cup ===
| Pos | Team | Pld | Pts |
|---|---|---|---|
| 1 | Kildare (C) | 5 | 10 |
| 2 | Mayo | 5 | 8 |
| 3 | Derry | 5 | 6 |
| 4 | London | 5 | 4 |
| 5 | Sligo | 5 | 2 |
| 6 | Wicklow | 5 | 0 |

=== Nicky Rackard Cup ===
| Pos | Team | Pld | Pts |
|---|---|---|---|
| 1 | Roscommon | 5 | 9 |
| 2 | Tyrone (C) | 5 | 8 |
| 3 | Donegal | 5 | 7 |
| 4 | Armagh | 5 | 4 |
| 5 | Fermanagh | 5 | 2 |
| 6 | Warwickshire | 5 | 0 |

=== Lory Meagher Cup ===
| Pos | Team | Pld | Pts |
|---|---|---|---|
| 1 | Longford | 5 | 8 |
| 2 | Louth (C) | 5 | 6 |
| 3 | Leitrim | 5 | 6 |
| 4 | Monaghan | 5 | 4 |
| 5 | Lancashire | 5 | 2 |
| 6 | Cavan | 5 | 0 |

=== 2022 County Ranking (Championship) ===
| Pos | Team | Position | Notes |
|---|---|---|---|
| 1 | Limerick | All-Ireland Champions | Munster champions |
| 2 | Kilkenny | All-Ireland Runners-up | Leinster champions |
| 3 | Galway | Semi-Finals | Highest Ranked Connacht County |
| 4 | Clare | Semi-Finals | |
| 5 | Cork | Quarter-Finals | |
| 6 | Wexford | Quarter-Finals | |
| 7 | Dublin | 4th (Leinster) | |
| 8 | Waterford | 4th (Munster) | |
| 9 | Westmeath | 5th (Leinster) | |
| 10 | Tipperary | 5th (Munster) | |
| 11 | Laois | 6th (Leinster) | Relegated |
| 12 | Antrim | Joe McDonagh Cup champions | Highest Ranked Ulster County |
| 13 | Kerry | 2nd (Joe McDonagh) | |
| 14 | Carlow | 3rd (Joe McDonagh) | |
| 15 | Offaly | 4th (Joe McDonagh) | |
| 16 | Down | 5th (Joe McDonagh) | |
| 17 | Meath | 6th (Joe McDonagh) | Relegated |
| 18 | Kildare | Christy Ring Cup champions | |
| 19 | Mayo | 2nd (Christy Ring) | |
| 20 | Derry | 3rd (Christy Ring) | |
| 21 | London | 4th (Christy Ring) | |
| 22 | Sligo | 5th (Christy Ring) | |
| 23 | Wicklow | 6th (Christy Ring) | Relegated |
| 24 | Tyrone | Nicky Rackard Cup champions | |
| 25 | Roscommon | 2nd (Nicky Rackard) | |
| 26 | Donegal | 3rd (Nicky Rackard) | |
| 27 | Armagh | 4th (Nicky Rackard) | |
| 28 | Fermanagh | 5th (Nicky Rackard) | |
| 29 | Warwickshire | 6th (Nicky Rackard) | Relegated |
| 30 | Louth | Lory Meagher Cup champions | |
| 31 | Longford | 2nd (Lory Meagher) | |
| 32 | Leitrim | 3rd (Lory Meagher) | |
| 33 | Monaghan | 4th (Lory Meagher) | |
| 34 | Lancashire | 5th (Lory Meagher) | |
| 35 | Cavan | 6th (Lory Meagher) | |

== Leinster Senior Hurling Championship ==
=== Group Stage ===
| Pos | Team | Pld | W | D | L | SF | SA | Diff | Pts | Qualification Notes |
|---|---|---|---|---|---|---|---|---|---|---|
| 1 | Galway | 5 | 4 | 1 | 0 | 7–143 | 5–95 | +54 | 9 | Advance to Leinster SHC Final |
| 2 | Kilkenny | 5 | 3 | 0 | 2 | 14–117 | 4–96 | +51 | 6 | Advance to Leinster SHC Final |
| 3 | Wexford | 5 | 2 | 2 | 1 | 8–106 | 4–98 | +20 | 6 | Advance to All-Ireland preliminary quarter-finals |
| 4 | Dublin | 5 | 3 | 0 | 2 | 1–109 | 6–106 | −12 | 6 | |
| 5 | Westmeath | 5 | 1 | 1 | 3 | 10–91 | 9–125 | −31 | 3 | |
| 6 | Laois | 5 | 0 | 0 | 5 | 4–80 | 16–136 | −92 | 0 | Relegated to Joe McDonagh Cup |

Antrim beat Kerry in the 2022 Joe McDonagh Cup final and were promoted to the 2023 Leinster Senior Hurling Championship. Laois were relegated to the 2023 Joe McDonagh Cup as they finished last in the 2022 Leinster Senior Hurling Championship.

=== Leinster round 1 ===
| 16 April 2022 Round 1 | Wexford | 1–19 (22) – 1–19 (22) | Galway | Wexford |
| | | | | Venue: Chadwicks Wexford Park |
| | Gls: C McDonald 1. Pts: R O’Connor 6 (4f), L Chin 5 (3f, 1 ’65), C McDonald 2, O Foley 2, M Fanning 1 (pen), S Donohoe 1, C Flood 1 C Dunbar 1. | Report | Gls: B Concannon 1. Pts: C Cooney 8 (4f, 3 ’65), T Monaghan 4, C Whelan 2, J Cooney 2, D Morrissey 1, B Concannon 1, C Mannion 1. | Referee: T Walsh (Waterford); Attendance: 10,200; TV: Sky Sports |

| 16 April 2022 Round 1 | Westmeath | 1–19 (22) – 5–23 (38) | Kilkenny | Mullingar |
| | | | | Venue: TEG Cusack Park |
| | Gls: O McCabe 1. Pts: K Doyle 14 (11f), J Boyle 2, N O’Brien 1, D Glennon 1, D Egerton 1. | Report | Gls: TJ Reid 1, W Walsh 1, B Ryan 1, J Maher 1, M Carey 1. Pts: A Murphy 7 (6f), TJ Reid 4 (1 ‘65’, 2f), P Walsh 4, W Walsh 2, A Mullen 2, B Ryan 1, J Maher 1, C Kenny 1, E Cody 1 | Referee: R McGann (Clare) |

| 16 April 2022 Round 1 | Dublin | 1–20 (23) – 2–15 (21) | Laois | Dublin |
| | | | | Venue: Parnell Park |
| | Gls: A Considine 1 (f). Pts: D Burke 13 (8f), F Whitely 3, J Madden 1, C Crummey 1, P Crummey 1, R Hayes 1. | Report | Gls: E Rowland 1 (f), H Dowling 1. Pts: PJ Scully 8 (5f), E Rowland 2 (2f), J Keyes 2, R King 1, C Dwyer 1, A Corby 1 | Referee: L Gordon (Galway) |

=== Leinster round 2 ===
| 23 April 2022 Round 2 | Kilkenny | 2–34 (40) – 1–14 (17) | Laois | Kilkenny |
| | | | | Venue: Nowlan Park |
| | Gls: E Cody 1, T Phelan 1. Pts: TJ Reid 10 (7f), A Mullen 6, E Cody 5, W Walsh 4, P Walsh 4 J Donnelly 2, J Maher 2, T Phelan 1. | Report | Gls: P Purcell 1. Pts: PJ Scully 4 (4f), P Purcell 2 (1f), C Dwyer 3, J Keyes 1, A Corby 1, C McEvoy 1, R Mullaney 1, C Byrne 1. | Referee: L Gordon (Galway) |

| 23 April 2022 Round 2 | Wexford | 0–23 (23) – 0–24 (24) | Dublin | Wexford |
| | | | | Venue: Chadwicks Wexford Park |
| | Pts: L Chin 7 (6f, 1 65), R O’Connor 5 (4f), D Reck 3, M Fanning 3 (3f), C Flood 1, L O McGovern 1, C McDonald 1, S Donohoe 1, D O’Keeffe 1. | Report | Pts: D Burke 12 (8f), R Hayes 2, F Whitley 2, C Burke 2, R Burke 2, E O’Donnell 1, D Ryan 1, C Crummey 1, A Mellett 1. | Referee: F Horgan (Tipperary) |

| 23 April 2022 Round 2 | Galway | 3–36 (45) – 1–17 (20) | Westmeath | Galway |
| | | | | Venue: Pearse Stadium |
| | Gls: J Cooney 1, C Cooney 1 (pen), C Fahy 1. Pts: C Cooney 8 (5f)J Cooney 5, C Mannion 4, C Fahy 4, David Burke 3, B Concannon 2, G Lee 2, P Mannion 2, E Niland 2, T Monaghan 1, E Burke 1, F Burke 1, D Morrissey 1. | Report | Gls: D McNicholas 1. Pts: K Doyle 14 (12f, 1 ’65), K Regan 1, D Glennon, J Bermingham 1. | Referee: P Murphy (Carlow) |

=== Leinster round 3 ===
| 1 May 2022 Round 3 | Laois | 0–12 (12) – 6–21 (39) | Wexford | Portlaoise |
| | | (HT: 0-07 – 1–10) | | Venue: MW Hire O'Moore Park |
| | Pts: PJ Scully 8 (8f); B McGinley 2; E Rowland 1, R Mullaney 1. | Report | Gls: M Fanning 2 (2 pen), R O'Connor 1, D O'Keeffe 1, K Foley 1, C McDonald 1. Pts: L Chin 7 (4f, 1, ’65); R O’Connor 3; C McDonald 2; L Óg McGovern 2; M Fanning 1 (f); D O’Keeffe 1; C Devitt 1, D Reck 1, M O’Hanlon 1, J O’Connor 1, C Flood 1. | Referee: C Cunning (Antrim) |

| 1 May 2022 Round 3 | Galway | 1–24 (27) – 3–17 (26) | Kilkenny | Galway |
| | | (HT: 1–17 – 2-08) | | Venue: Pearse Stadium |
| | Gls: J Coen 1. Pts: C Cooney 6 (fs), B Concannon 4, J Cooney 4, T Monaghan 3, C Mannion 2, F Burke 2 (two line cuts), P Mannion 1, David Burke 1, C Fahy 1. | Report | Gls: E Cody 1, B Ryan 1, J Donnelly 1. Pts: A Murphy 5 (4fs), W Walsh 3, TJ Reid 3 (2fs), E Cody 2, P Walsh 2, M Carey 1, A Mullen 1. | Referee: C Lyons (Cork); Attendance: 14,034; TV: RTÉ2 |

| 1 May 2022 Round 3 | Westmeath | 1–16 (19) – 0–27 (27) | Dublin | Mullingar |
| | | | | Venue: TEG Cusack Park |
| | Gls: N O'Brien 1. Pts: K Doyle 11 (10fs), N O Brien 3, K Regan 1, T Doyle 1. | Report | Pts: D Burke 11 (7fs), R McBride 6, C Crummey 3, J Madden 2, F Whitely 2, C O’Callaghan 1, C Burke 1, D Sutcliffe 1. | Referee: S Cleere (Kilkenny) |

=== Leinster round 4 ===
| 14 May 2022 Round 4 | Laois | 0–21 (21) – 2–37 (43) | Galway | Portlaoise |
| | | (HT: 0–12 – 0–18) | | Venue: MW Hire O'Moore Park |
| | Pts: R King 4 (3fs), P Purcell 4 (1f), C Dwyer 3, R King 3 (fs), J Keyes 3, E Rowland 1 (f), J Kelly 1, S Downey 1, T Keyes 1. | Report | Gls: C Whelan 1, J Cooney 1. Pts: C Mannion 8, C Cooney 7 (5fs), T Monaghan 6, C Whelan 2, J Cooney 2, C Fahy 2, P Mannion 2, D Morrissey 2, E Murphy 1, B Concannon 1, J Grealish 1, F Burke 1, E Niland 1 (f), J Flynn 1. | Referee: S Cleere (Kilkenny) |

| 14 May 2022 Round 4 | Westmeath | 2–15 (21) – 0–21 (21) | Wexford | Mullingar |
| | | | | Venue: TEG Cusack Park |
| | Gls: D McNicholas 1, Mitchell 1. Pts: K Doyle 11 (9f, 1 ’65), A Craig 1, D Glennon 1, N O’Brien 1, K Regan 1. | Report | Pts: L Chin 9 (7f), L Óg McGovern 2, O Foley 2, S Donohoe 2, C McDonald 2, R O’Connor 2, P Morris 1, C Hearne 1. | Referee: S Hynes (Galway) |

| 14 May 2022 Round 4 | Dublin | 0–17 (17) – 3–25 (34) | Kilkenny | Dublin |
| | | (HT: 0–11 – 1–11) | | Venue: Parnell Park |
| | Pts: D Burke 9 (7f), C Burke 2, E Dillon 1, F Whitely 1, C Crummey 1, D Gray 1, R McBride 1, M Schutte 1. | Report | Gls: M Keoghan 2, TJ Reid 1. Pts: TJ Reid 7 (5f), A Mullen 5, C Kenny 4, A Murphy 3, E Cody 2, B Ryan 1, J Donnelly 1, C Buckley 1, M Keoghan 1. | Referee: T Walsh (Waterford); Attendance: 8,750; TV: Sky Sports |

=== Leinster round 5 ===
| 21 May 2022 Round 5 | Kilkenny | 1–18 (21) – 1–22 (25) | Wexford | Kilkenny |
| | | (HT: 1-08 – 1–11) | | Venue: Nowlan Park |
| | Gls: M Keoghan 1. Pts: TJ Reid 10 (8f, 1 65); M Carey 2, A Mullen 2; M Keoghan 1; W Walsh 1, B Ryan 1 (l/b), P Walsh 1. | Report | Gls: O Foley 1 Pts: L Chin 0–9 (7fs); D O’Keeffe 2, R O’Connor 2, S Donohoe 2; C McDonald 1, L Og McGovern 1, J O’Connor 1, L Ryan 1, M Dwyer 1, C Flood 1, C Dunbar 1. | Referee: F Horgan (Tipperary); Attendance: 13,565; TV: Sky Sports |

| 21 May 2022 Round 5 | Galway | 0–27 (27) – 0–21 (21) | Dublin | Galway |
| | | (HT: 0–15 – 0–11) | | Venue: Pearse Stadium |
| | Pts: C Cooney 13 (12f), C Whelan 5, C Mannion 3, J Cooney 2, F Burke 2 (1 sideline), B Concannon 1, C Fahy 1. | Report | Pts: D Burke 14 (9f), R McBride 2, C Burke 1, C Crummey 1, D Sutcliffe 1, E Dillon 1, P Crummey 1. | Referee: J Murphy (Limerick); Attendance: 10,583 |

| 21 May 2022 Round 5 | Laois | 1–18 (21) – 5–24 (39) | Westmeath | Portlaoise |
| | | (HT: 1–14 – 1–14) | | Venue: MW Hire O'Moore Park |
| | Gls: P Purcell 1. Pts: R King 7 (4fs) E Rowland 4 (4fs), J Keyes 2, B Conroy 2, C Dwyer 1, P Purcell 1, P Dunne 1 | Report | Gls: E Keyes 2, N Mitchell 2, N O'Brien 1. Pts: K Doyle 8 (4fs), J Boyle 4, N O’Brien 3, D Glennon 3, J Galvin 2, C Boyle 1, J Gillen 1, E Keyes 1, A Craig 1. | Referee: C Cunning (Antrim) |

=== Leinster final ===
| 4 June 2022 Final | Galway | 0–17 (17) – 0–22 (22) | Kilkenny | Dublin |
| 19:00 | | (HT: 0-09 – 0–11) | | Venue: Croke Park |
| | Pts: C Cooney 9 (5f, 2 65, 1 sideline), C Whelan 4, C Fahy 2, F Burke 1, P Mannion 1 (f). | Report | Pts: TJ Reid 12 (11f, 1 65), A Mullen 4, P Deegan 2, B Ryan 1, M Keoghan 1, P Walsh 1. | Referee: J Owens (Wexford); Attendance: 25,951; TV: RTÉ2 |

== Munster Senior Hurling Championship ==
=== Group Stage ===
| Pos | Team | Pld | W | D | L | SF | SA | Diff | Pts | Qualification Notes |
|---|---|---|---|---|---|---|---|---|---|---|
| 1 | Clare | 4 | 3 | 1 | 0 | 6–104 | 7–79 | +22 | 7 | Advance to Munster SHC Final |
| 2 | Limerick | 4 | 3 | 1 | 0 | 6–97 | 3–85 | +21 | 7 | Advance to Munster SHC Final |
| 3 | Cork | 4 | 2 | 0 | 2 | 8–89 | 4–96 | +5 | 4 | Advance to All-Ireland preliminary quarter-finals |
| 4 | Waterford | 4 | 1 | 0 | 3 | 7–76 | 7–103 | −27 | 2 | |
| 5 | Tipperary | 4 | 0 | 0 | 4 | 5–83 | 11–96 | −31 | 0 | |

=== Munster round 1 ===
| 17 April 2022 Round 1 | Waterford | 2–24 (30) – 2–20 (26) | Tipperary | Waterford |
| 14:00 | | (HT: 0–12 – 1–11) | | Venue: Walsh Park |
| | Gls: D Hutchinson 1, M Kiely 1. Pts: Stephen Bennett 10 (fs), P Curran 4, D Hutchinson 3, S McNulty 2, J Barron 2, A Gleeson 2, J Prendergast 1. | Report | Gls: M Kehoe 2 Pts: N McGrath 6 (2f), J Forde 4 (fs), M Breen 2, D McCormack 2, J Morris 2, B Heffernan 1, C Stakelum 1, C Bowe 1, Brian Hogan 1 (f). | Referee: J Murphy (Limerick); Attendance: 10,982; TV: RTÉ2 |

| 17 April 2022 Round 1 | Cork | 1–17 (20) – 2–25 (31) | Limerick | Cork |
| 16:00 | | (HT: 1-08 – 2-09) | | Venue: Páirc Uí Chaoimh |
| | Gls: S Kingston 1 Pts: P Horgan 9 (8f), R O'Flynn 2, S Barrett 2, C Lehane 2, D Fitzgibbon, T O'Mahony 1 | Report | Gls: K Hayes 1, A Gillane 1 Pts: D Byrnes 6 (4f), A Gillane 4 (2f), G Hegarty 3, C Lynch 2, B Nash 2, C O'Neill 2, T Morrissey 1, D Morrissey 1, D Hannon 1, P Ryan 1, D Reidy 1 | Referee: J Keenan (Wicklow); TV: RTÉ2 |

=== Munster round 2 ===
| 23 April 2022 Round 2 | Limerick | 0–30 (30) – 2–21 (27) | Waterford | Limerick |
| 19:00 | | (HT: 0–14 – 0–13) | | Venue: TUS Gaelic Grounds |
| | Pts: A Gillane 13 (7 fs); D Byrnes 6 (5fs); C O’Neill 3, G Hegarty 2, D O’Donovan 2, T Morrissey 2; P Ryan 1, D Reidy 1. | Report | Gls: Stephen Bennett 1, J Prendergast 1. Pts: Stephen Bennett 7 (6 fs, 1 65); A Gleeson 5 (3fs, 1 sl); D Hutchison 5; C Lyons 3, P Curran 1. | Referee: S Stack (Dublin); Attendance: 27,448; TV: Sky Sports |

| 24 April 2022 Round 2 | Tipperary | 2–16 (22) – 3–21 (30) | Clare | Thurles |
| 14:00 | | (HT: 0-07 – 3–11) | | Venue: Semple Stadium |
| | Gls: G Browne 1, B Heffernan 1. Pts: J Forde 7 (4f, 2 65s, 1 sl); G Browne 3; R Maher 2 (1f); C Barrett 1, N McGrath 1, M Breen 1, M Kehoe 1. | Report | Gls: T Kelly 1 (pen), I Galvin 1, P Duggan 1. Pts: T Kelly 7 (5f); I Galvin 2, P Duggan 2; R Mounsey 2, R Taylor 2, S O’Donnell 2; D Fitzgerald 1, R Hayes 1, D Ryan 1, D McInerney 1. | Referee: J Owens (Wexford); Attendance: 17,260; TV: RTÉ2 |

=== Munster round 3 ===
| 1 May 2022 Round 3 | Cork | 2–20 (26) – 0–28 (28) | Clare | Thurles |
| 14:00 | | (HT: 0–11 – 0–17) | | Venue: Semple Stadium |
| | Gls: A Connolly 1, D Fitzgibbon 1. Pts: P Horgan 10 (6fs 1 65), R O'Flynn 3, S Harnedy 2, S Kingston 2, A Connolly 1, T O'Mahony 1, C Lehane 1. | Report | Pts: T Kelly 10 (4fs 2 65s), D Fitzgerald 3, P Duggan 3, R Taylor 3, S O'Donnell 2, C Malone 2, I Galvin 2, D Ryan 1, D McInerney 1, R Mounsey 1. | Referee: P O'Dwyer (Carlow); Attendance: 20,834 |

| 8 May 2022 Round 3 | Limerick | 3–21 (30) – 0–23 (23) | Tipperary | Limerick |
| 14:00 | | (HT: 1-09 – 0–14) | | Venue: TUS Gaelic Grounds |
| | Gls: A Gillane 2, C Boylan 1. Pts: A Gillane 5 (4f), D Byrnes 3 (2f), T Morrissey 3, D O’Donovan 2, C O’Neill 2, B Nash 1, D Hannon 1, G Hegarty 1, G Mulcahy 1, S Flanagan 1, D Reidy 1. | Report | Pts: N McGrath 13 (9f, 2 ’65, 1 sideline), G Browne 3, J Morris 3, B Heffernan 1, A Flynn 1, M Kehoe 1, R Byrne 1. | Referee: L Gordon (Galway); Attendance: 27,111 |

=== Munster round 4 ===
| 15 May 2022 Round 4 | Waterford | 1–19 (22) – 2–22 (28) | Cork | Waterford |
| 14:00 | | (HT: 1–11 – 1–12) | | Venue: Walsh Park |
| | Gls: M Kiely 1 Pts: Stephen Bennett 7 (6f), A Gleeson 4 (1f), P Curran 2 (1f), N Montgomery 2, J Prendergast 1, D Hutchinson 1, Shane Bennett 1, P Hogan 1. | Report | Gls: A Connolly 2. Pts: S Harnedy 5, C Lehane 5 (2f), P Horgan 4 (fs), S Kingston 2, D Fitzgibbon 2, M Coleman 2, L Meade 1, P Collins 1. Scorers for Cork: | Referee: J Owens (Wexford); Attendance: 10,986; TV: RTÉ2 |

| 15 May 2022 Round 4 | Clare | 0–24 (24) – 1–21 (24) | Limerick | Ennis |
| 16:00 | | (HT: 0–15 – 1–12) | | Venue: Cusack Park |
| | Pts: T Kelly 16 (10 frees, 1 '65), D Fitzgerald 2, D Ryan 2, R Taylor 2, D McInerney 1, S Meehan 1. | Report | Gls: K Hayes 1 Pts: D Byrnes 9 (7fs, 1 '65), G Hegarty 4, D Reidy 4 (fs), S Flanagan 1, T Morrissey 1, O O'Reilly 1, D O'Donovan 1. | Referee: C Lyons (Cork); Attendance: 18,129; TV: RTÉ2 |

=== Munster round 5 ===
| 22 May 2022 Round 5 | Tipperary | 1–24 (27) – 3–30 (39) | Cork | Thurles |
| 16:00 | | | | Venue: Semple Stadium |
| | Gls: J Morris 1. Pts: N McGrath 13 (12f), J Forde 5, J Morris 2, R Maher 1 (1f), C Stakelum 1, D Quirke 1, P Maher 1. | Report | Gls: T O'Mahony 1, A Connolly 1, D Fitzgibbon 1. Pts: C Lehane 8 (1f), P Horgan 5 (3f, 1 ’65), S Kingston 4, M Coleman 3 (1f), R O’Flynn 3, S Harnedy 3, J O’Connor 2, T O’Mahony 1, A Connolly 1. | Referee: S Stack (Dublin); Attendance: 27,131; TV: RTÉ2 |

| 22 May 2022 Round 5 | Clare | 3–31 (40) – 2–22 (28) | Waterford | Ennis |
| 16:00 | | | | Venue: Cusack Park |
| | Gls: D Fitzgerald 2, D Reidy 1. Pts: P Duggan 8 (3f, 2’65, 1SC), S O’Donnell 5, C Malone 4, D Fitzgerald 3, D Reidy 2, D McInerney 2, R Taylor 2, R Mounsey 2, I Galvin 1, S Golden 1, S Meehan 1. | Report | Gls: D Hutchinson 1, P Curran 1. Pts: D Hutchinson 6, P Curran 4 (2f), S Bennett 5 (3f 1’65), C Lyons 2, K Bennett 2, P Hogan 1, P Mahony 1, A Gleeson 1. | Referee: P O’Dwyer (Carlow); Attendance: 16,144; TV: RTÉ One |

=== Munster final ===
| 5 June 2022 Final | Clare | 0–29 – 1–29 (a.e.t.) | Limerick | Thurles |
| 16:00 | | (HT: 0–14 – 1–11) (FT: 0–24 – 1–21) | | Venue: Semple Stadium |
| | Pts: T Kelly 13 (5f, 1 sideline), D Fitzgerald 5, P Duggan 4 (3f, 1 sideline), R Taylor 3, M Rodgers 2 (1f), I Galvin 1, S Meehan 1. | Report | Gls: G Hegarty 1. Pts: A Gillane 10 (7f), S Flanagan 8, T Morrissey 3, C O’Neill 2, D Byrnes 1 (f), D Hannon 1, D O’Donovan 1, C Boylan 1, D Reidy 1, W O'Donoghue 1. | Referee: J Keenan (Wicklow); Attendance: 43,112; TV: RTÉ2 |

== Cup competitions ==
=== Joe McDonagh Cup (Tier 2) ===
==== Group stage ====
| Pos | Team | Pld | W | D | L | SF | SA | Diff | Pts | Qualification |
|---|---|---|---|---|---|---|---|---|---|---|
| 1 | Antrim | 5 | 4 | 0 | 1 | 20–116 | 9–104 | +45 | 8 | Advance to Final and All-Ireland preliminary quarter-finals |
| 2 | Kerry | 5 | 3 | 0 | 2 | 11–121 | 7–91 | +42 | 6 | Advance to Final and All-Ireland preliminary quarter-finals |
| 3 | Carlow | 5 | 3 | 0 | 2 | 7–114 | 6–96 | +21 | 6 | |
| 4 | Offaly | 5 | 3 | 0 | 2 | 9–112 | 7–109 | +9 | 6 | |
| 5 | Down | 5 | 2 | 0 | 3 | 9–100 | 11–110 | −16 | 4 | |
| 6 | Meath | 5 | 0 | 0 | 5 | 5–81 | 21–134 | −101 | 0 | Relegated to Christy Ring Cup |

==== Final ====
| 4 June 2022 Final | Antrim | 5–22 (37) – 4–24 (36) | Kerry | Croke Park |
| 16:30 | C Cunning 1–12 (0-9f), C Clarke 2–2 (1–0 pen), J McNaughton 1–1, S Elliott 1–0, K Molloy and N McManus 0–2 each, N McKenna, D McKernan and E O’Neill 0–1 each. | Report | P Boyle 2–11 (1–0 pen, 0-7f, 1 ’65), J Conway 2–2, D Collins 0–3, M Leane and S Conway 0–2 each, F Mackessy, G Dooley, M O’Connor and P O’Connor 0–1 each. | Referee: S Stack (Dublin) |

== Bracket ==
Preliminary quarter-finals
Wexford | 3–30
Kerry | 0–18
Cork | 3–27
Antrim | 2–19

Quarter-Finals
Clare | 1–24
Wexford | 3–14
Galway | 2–19
Cork | 1–21

Semi-Finals
Kilkenny | 2–26
Clare | 0–20
Limerick | 0–27
Galway | 1–21

All-Ireland Final
Kilkenny | 2–26
Limerick | 1–31

== Preliminary quarter-finals ==
| 11 June 2022 Preliminary QF | Antrim | 2–19 (25) – 3–27 (36) | Cork | Belfast |
| 14:00 | | (HT: 2–11 – 2–10) | | Venue: Corrigan Park |
| | Gls: J McNaughton 1, K Molloy 1. Pts: J McNaughton 9 (6f), K Molloy 3, C Cunning 2 (fs), N McManus 1 (sideline), S Elliott 1, C Johnston 1, D Kearney 1, P Burke 1. | Report | Gls: C Lehane 1 (pen), D Fitzgibbon 1, S Harnedy 1. Pts: C Lehane 9 (2f, 1 65), R O’Flynn 6, S Harnedy 3, D Fitzgibbon 3, A Connolly 2, P Horgan 2, M Coleman 1 (f), C Cahalane 1. | Referee: L Gordon (Galway); TV: GAAGO |

| 11 June 2022 Preliminary QF | Kerry | 0–18 (18) – 3–30 (39) | Wexford | Tralee |
| 14:00 | | (HT: 0-08 – 0–16) | | Venue: Austin Stack Park |
| | Pts: P Boyle 7 (5fs); J Conway 5 (3fs, 1 65); E Ross 3 (1sl); P O’Connor 1, S Weir 1, F Mackessy 1. | Report | Gls: C McDonald 1, R O'Connor 1, C Hearne 1. Pts: L Chin 14 (10fs, 1 65); C McDonald 3; R O’Connor 4 (1f); O Foley 2; L Og McGovern 2; M Dwyer 1, D Reck 1, M O’Hanlon 1, L Ryan 1, C Devitt 1. | Referee: J Murphy (Limerick); Attendance: 2,700; TV: GAAGO |

== Quarter-finals ==
| 18 June 2022 QF1 | Galway | 2–19 (25) – 1–21 (24) | Cork | Thurles |
| 13:45 | | (HT: 1-06 – 0-07) | | Venue: Semple Stadium |
| | Gls: C Whelan 1, J Grealish 1 Pts: C Mannion 4, C Cooney 4 (3f, 1 65), C Whelan 2, J Cooney 2, D Burke 2, R Glennon 1, T Monaghan 1, J Coen 1, B Concannon 1, J Flynn 1 | Report | Gls: S Kingston 1 Pts: P Horgan 4 (2f, 1 65), D Fitzgibbon 3, A Cadogan 3, M Coleman 3 (2f, 1 sideline), R O’Flynn 3, S Kingston 2 (1f), L Meade 1, D Cahalane 1, C Lehane 1 (1f) | Referee: Paud O'Dwyer; Attendance: 34,640; TV: RTÉ |

| 18 June 2022 QF2 | Clare | 1–24 (27) – 3–14 (23) | Wexford | Thurles |
| 15:45 | | (HT: 0–10 – 1-07) | | Venue: Semple Stadium |
| | Gls: A Shanagher 1 Pts: P Duggan 6 (6f), T Kelly 4, D Ryan 3, A Shanagher 2, I Galvin 2, D Reidy 2, S O’Donnell 2, S Meehan 2, D Fitzgerald 1, R Taylor 1 | Report | Gls: L Chin 1, M Fanning 1 (1f), J O’Connor 1 Pts: L Chin 8 (6f), O Foley 2, D Reck 1, K Foley 1, R O’Connor 1, M Dwyer 1, D O’Keeffe 1 | Referee: Colm Lyons; Attendance: 34,640; TV: RTÉ |

== Semi-finals ==
| 2 July 2022 SF1 | Kilkenny | 2–26 (32) – 0–20 (20) | Clare | Dublin |
| | | (HT: 1–17 (20) – 0-06 (6)) | | Venue: Croke Park |
| | Gls: Cian Kenny 1, Martin Keoghan 1 Pts: TJ Reid 10 (7f), Adrian Mullen 5, Cian Kenny 2, Eoin Cody 3, Pádraig Walsh 2, Billy Ryan 2, Conor Browne 1, Walter Walsh 1 | Report | Pts: Shane O’Donnell 4, Tony Kelly 4 (3f, 1 ’65), Diarmuid Ryan 3, David Fitzgerald 3, Mark Rodgers 2, David McInerney 1, Peter Duggan 1 (1f), Ryan Taylor 1, Rory Hayes 1 each | Referee: Fergal Horgan (Tipperary); Attendance: 39,626; TV: RTÉ and Sky Sports |

| 3 July 2022 SF2 | Limerick | 0–27 (27) – 1–21 (24) | Galway | Dublin |
| | | (HT: 0–16 – 0–12) | | Venue: Croke Park |
| | Pts: Aaron Gillane 8 (2f), Diarmaid Byrnes 6 (6f), Kyle Hayes 3, David Reidy 3, Séamus Flanagan 2, Barry Nash 1, Declan Hannon 1, William O’Donoghue 1, Tom Morrissey 1, Gearóid Hegarty 1 | Report | Gls: Brian Concannon 1 Pts: Conor Cooney 5 (4f), Cathal Mannion 4, Tom Monaghan 4, Conor Whelan 2, Padraic Mannion 2 (1f), Ronan Glennon 2, Fintan Burke 1, Joseph Cooney 1 | Referee: Thomas Walsh (Waterford); Attendance: 52,215; TV: RTÉ and Sky Sports |

== Final ==
RTÉ
Sky Sports

17 July 2022
15:30
Final

Report

| Kilkenny | 2–26 (32) – (34) 1–31 | Limerick |
|---|---|---|
(HT: 0–16 (16) – (20) 1–17)
| Gls: Martin Keoghan 1, Billy Ryan 1 Pts: TJ Reid 9 (9f), Martin Keoghan 1, Adrian Mullen 3, Paddy Deegan 2, Padraig Walsh 2, Eoin Cody 1, Tommy Walsh 1, Mikey Carey 1, Richie Reid 1, David Blanchfield 1, Alan Murphy 1, Walter Walsh 1, John Donnelly 1, Richie Hogan 1 | | Gls: Gearoid Hegarty 1 Pts: Gearoid Hegarty 5, Aaron Gillane 6 (4f), Diarmaid Byrnes 5 (3f, 1 '65), Kyle Hayes 4, Tom Morrissey 4, Séamus Flanagan 2, Declan Hannon 1, Dan Morrissey 1, Conor Boylan 1, Cathal O'Neill 1 |

Croke Park, Dublin
Referee: Colm Lyons (Cork)
Attendance: ~82,000

== Stadia and locations ==
| County | Location | Province | Stadium | Capacity |
|---|---|---|---|---|
| Antrim | Belfast | Ulster | Corrigan Park | |
| Carlow | Carlow | Leinster | Dr Cullen Park | |
| Clare | Ennis | Munster | Cusack Park | |
| Cork | Cork | Munster | Páirc Uí Chaoimh | |
| Down | Newry | Ulster | Páirc Esler | |
| Dublin | Donnycarney | Leinster | Parnell Park | |
| Galway | Galway | Connacht | Pearse Stadium | |
| Kerry | Tralee | Munster | Austin Stack Park | |
| Kilkenny | Kilkenny | Leinster | Nowlan Park | |
| Laois | Portlaoise | Leinster | O'Moore Park | |
| Limerick | Limerick | Munster | Gaelic Grounds | |
| Meath | Navan | Leinster | Páirc Tailteann | |
| Offaly | Tullamore | Leinster | O'Connor Park | |
| Tipperary | Thurles | Munster | Semple Stadium | |
| Waterford | Waterford | Munster | Walsh Park | |
| Westmeath | Mullingar | Leinster | Cusack Park | |
| Wexford | Wexford | Leinster | Chadwicks Wexford Park | |

== Statistics ==
=== Top scorers ===
Top scorer overall

| Rank | Player | County | Tally | Total | Matches | Average |
|---|---|---|---|---|---|---|
| 1 | T. J. Reid | Kilkenny | 2–65 | 71 | 8 | 8.87 |
| 2 | Conor Cooney | Galway | 1–60 | 63 | 8 | 7.87 |
| 3 | Lee Chin | Wexford | 1–59 | 62 | 7 | 8.85 |
| 4 | Tony Kelly | Clare | 1–58 | 61 | 7 | 8.71 |
| 5 | Donal Burke | Dublin | 0–59 | 59 | 5 | 11.80 |
| 6 | Killian Doyle | Westmeath | 0–58 | 58 | 5 | 11.60 |
| 7 | Aaron Gillane | Limerick | 3–47 | 56 | 6 | 9.33 |
| 8 | Diarmaid Byrnes | Limerick | 0–36 | 36 | 7 | 5.14 |
| 9 | Patrick Horgan | Cork | 0–34 | 34 | 6 | 5.66 |
| 10 | Noel McGrath | Tipperary | 0–33 | 33 | 4 | 8.25 |

In a single game

| Rank | Player | County | Tally | Total | Opposition |
|---|---|---|---|---|---|
| 1 | Tony Kelly | Clare | 0–16 | 16 | Limerick |
| 2 | Lee Chin | Wexford | 0–14 | 14 | Kerry |
| 2 | Killian Doyle | Westmeath | 0–14 | 14 | Galway |
| 2 | Killian Doyle | Westmeath | 0–14 | 14 | Kilkenny |
| 2 | Donal Burke | Dublin | 0–14 | 14 | Galway |
| 6 | Donal Burke | Dublin | 0–13 | 13 | Laois |
| 6 | Noel McGrath | Tipperary | 0–13 | 13 | Cork |
| 6 | Conor Cooney | Galway | 0–13 | 13 | Dublin |
| 6 | Aaron Gillane | Limerick | 0–13 | 13 | Waterford |
| 6 | Noel McGrath | Tipperary | 0–13 | 13 | Limerick |
| 6 | Tony Kelly | Clare | 0–13 | 13 | Limerick |

== Miscellaneous ==
- Cork's Patrick Horgan surpassed Joe Canning to become the championship's all-time top scorer.
- Cork's seventeenth year in a row without an All-Ireland senior title, their longest dry spell since the founding of the championship.
- It was the first championship meeting between Cork and Antrim since 2010.
- It was the first championship meeting between Wexford and Kerry since the 1891 All-Ireland Senior Hurling Championship Final.
- This was the first year Down competed in the championship since 2004.
- It was the first All-Ireland final between Kilkenny and Limerick since 2007.
- It was the first Munster final between Clare and Limerick since 1995.
- It was the first Leinster final between Galway and Kilkenny since 2020.
- It was the first Joe McDonagh Cup final between Antrim and Kerry since 2020.
- This was Kilkenny's seventh season in a row without a title, their worst streak since 1984–1991 (which was eight years in a row). The last time Kilkenny lost three All Ireland finals per appearance was in 1940, 1945 and 1946 to Limerick, Tipperary and Cork respectively.
- Limerick join an elite group of hurling teams to have won 3 All Ireland's in a row. Kilkenny achieved this feat in 2008, previous to that Cork won it in 1978 and Tipperary last completed it in 1951.

== Live television coverage ==
RTÉ, the national broadcaster in Ireland, provided the majority of the live television coverage of the hurling championship with 17 games shown. Sky Sports also broadcast a number of matches and had exclusive rights to some games.

== Awards ==
Sunday Game Team of the Year

The Sunday Game team of the year was picked 17 July on the night of the final. The panel consisting of Jackie Tyrrell, Brendan Cummins, Donal Óg Cusack, Davy Fitzgerald, Shane Dowling, and Ursula Jacob chose Diarmaid Byrnes as the Sunday game player of the year from a list that also contained TJ Reid and Barry Nash.

1. Nickie Quaid (Limerick)
2. Sean Finn (Limerick)
3. Huw Lawlor (Kilkenny)
4. Barry Nash (Limerick)
5. Diarmuid Byrnes (Limerick)
6. Declan Hannon (Limerick)
7. Pádraic Mannion (Galway)
8. Adrian Mullen (Kilkenny)
9. David Fitzgerald (Clare)
10. Gearoid Hegarty (Limerick)
11. Kyle Hayes (Limerick)
12. Shane O'Donnell (Clare)
13. Aaron Gillane (Limerick)
14. TJ Reid (Kilkenny)
15. Tony Kelly (Clare)

All Star Team of the Year

On 28 October, the All-Star winners were presented at a black-tie ceremony at the Convention Centre in Dublin. Diarmaid Byrnes was named as the All Stars Hurler of the Year with Mikey Butler named the All Stars Young Hurler of the Year.

| Pos. | Player | Team | Appearances |
|---|---|---|---|
| GK | Nickie Quaid | Limerick | 2 |
| RCB | Mikey Butler^{YHOTY} | Kilkenny | 1 |
| FB | Huw Lawlor | Kilkenny | 1 |
| LCB | Barry Nash | Limerick | 2 |
| RWB | Diarmaid Byrnes^{HOTY} | Limerick | 3 |
| CB | Declan Hannon | Limerick | 3 |
| LWB | Pádraic Mannion | Galway | 3 |
| MD | David Fitzgerald | Clare | 1 |
| MD | Adrian Mullen | Kilkenny | 1 |
| RWF | Gearóid Hegarty | Limerick | 2 |
| CF | Kyle Hayes | Limerick | 3 |
| LWF | Shane O'Donnell | Clare | 1 |
| RCF | Aaron Gillane | Limerick | 3 |
| FF | T. J. Reid | Kilkenny | 6 |
| LCF | Tony Kelly | Clare | 4 |

== See also ==
- 2022 Leinster Senior Hurling Championship
- 2022 Munster Senior Hurling Championship
- 2022 Joe McDonagh Cup (Tier 2)
- 2022 Christy Ring Cup (Tier 3)
- 2022 Nicky Rackard Cup (Tier 4)
- 2022 Lory Meagher Cup (Tier 5)
