= 1958 Limerick Senior Hurling Championship =

Annual hurling competition season

- Champions: Claughaun (7th title); Seán O'Connor (captain)
- Runners-up: Cappamore

The 1958 Limerick Senior Hurling Championship was the 64th staging of the Limerick Senior Hurling Championship since its establishment by the Limerick County Board in 1887.

Claughaun were the defending champions.

On 14 September 1958, Claughaun won the championship after a 2–09 to 1–04 defeat of Cappamore in the final. It was their seventh championship title overall and their second championship title in succession.

== Results ==
=== Final ===
14 September 1958 Final	Claughaun	2–09 – 1–04	Cappamore	Gaelic Grounds, Limerick
