= Dermot Kelly (hurler) =

Irish hurler (1932–2023)

Personal information
- Native name: Diarmuid Ó Ceallaig (Irish)
- Nickname: The singing bank manager
- Born: 25 December 1932 Limerick, Ireland
- Died: 22 February 2023 (aged 90) Limerick, Ireland
- Occupation: Bank manager
- Height: 5 ft 10 in (178 cm)

Sport
- Sport: Hurling
- Position: Centre-forward
Club
- Years: Club
- Claughaun
Club titles
	Football	Hurling
Limerick titles	2	3
Inter-county
- Years: County
- 1951–1959: Limerick
Inter-county titles
- Munster titles: 1
- All-Irelands: 0
- NHL: 0

Dermot Noel Kelly (25 December 1932 – 22 February 2023) was an Irish hurler. He lined out at club level with Claughaun and also played at inter-county level with Limerick.

== Career ==
Kelly first played hurling as a schoolboy with CBS Sexton Street in the Harty Cup. He later lined out as a dual player with the Claughaun club and won three Limerick SHC medals and two Limerick SFC medals.

Kelly first appeared on the inter-county scene with Limerick during a two-year stint with the minor team in 1949 and 1950. He immediately progressed on the senior team in 1951. Kelly enjoyed his greatest success with Limerick when he scored 1–12 to beat Clare in the 1955 Munster final. He continued to line out with Limerick until 1959. Kelly also earned selection to the Munster team and won four Railway Cup medals in six seasons.

== Personal life and death ==
As well as his sporting career, Kelly was also known as a songwriter and performer. He was also a member of the College Players Limerick in the 1950s and was a member of Conradh na Gaeilge. Kelly worked with the Bank of Ireland. His nephew, Stephen Lucey, was a dual player with Limerick.

Kelly was a renowned Irish ballad songwriter and composed many notable tunes including The Ballad Of Joseph McHugh about the famous Publican from Liscannor, County Clare. He was a past Captain and President of Lahinch Golf Club.

Kelly died on 22 February 2023, at the age of 90.

== Honours ==
Claughaun

- Limerick Senior Football Championship: 1955, 1959
- Limerick Senior Hurling Championship: 1957, 1958, 1968

Limerick

- Munster Senior Hurling Championship: 1955

Munster

- Railway Cup: 1955, 1957, 1958, 1960
