= 2022 Leinster Senior Hurling Championship =

2022 hurling championship

Leinster Senior Hurling Championship
Tournament details
- Province: Leinster
- Year: 2022
- Trophy: Bob O'Keeffe Cup
- Date: 16 April – 4 June 2022
- Teams: 6
- Defending champions: Kilkenny

Winners
- Champions: Kilkenny (74th win)
- Manager: Brian Cody
- Captain: Richie Reid
- Qualify for: All-Ireland SHC

Runners-up
- Runners-up: Galway
- Manager: Henry Shefflin
- Captain: Daithí Burke

Other
- Matches played: 16
- Website: Leinster GAA

The 2022 Leinster Senior Hurling Championship was the 2022 installment of the annual Leinster Senior Hurling Championship organised by Leinster GAA. Kilkenny were the defending champions having defeated Dublin in the 2021 final.

== Team changes ==
=== To Championship ===
Promoted from the Joe McDonagh Cup

- Westmeath

=== From Championship ===
Relegated to the Joe McDonagh Cup

- Antrim

== Teams ==
The Leinster championship was contested by five counties from the Irish province of Leinster, as well as one county from the province of Connacht, where the sport is only capable of supporting one county team at this level.

Team	Stadium	Location	Capacity
—	Croke Park	Jones' Road	82,300
Dublin	Parnell Park	Donnycarney	8,500
Galway	Pearse Stadium	Salthill	26,197
Kilkenny	UPMC Nowlan Park	O'Loughlin Road	27,000
Laois	O'Moore Park	Portlaoise	22,000
Westmeath	Cusack Park	Friars Mill Road	11,500
Wexford	Innovate Wexford Park	Clonard Road	18,000

== Personnel and general information ==
Team	Colours	Manager	Captain	Vice-captain	Sponsor	Most recent success		
Team	Colours	Manager	Captain	Vice-captain	Sponsor	All-Ireland	Provincial	League
Dublin		Mattie Kenny	Danny Sutcliffe		AIG	1938	2013	2011
Galway		Shane O'Neill	Pádraic Mannion	Conor Whelan	Supermacs	2017	2018	2017
Kilkenny		Brian Cody	Adrian Mullen	Joey Holden	Glanbia	2015	2021	2018
Laois		Eddie Brennan	Enda Rowland	Willie Dunphy	MW Hire Group	1915	1949	
Westmeath		Shane O'Brien						
Wexford					Gain	1996	2019	1972-73

== Group stage ==
=== Table ===
Pos	Team	Pld	W	D	L	SF	SA	Diff	Pts	Qualification Notes
1	Galway	5	4	1	0	7-143	5-95	+54	9	Advance to Leinster SHC Final
2	Kilkenny	5	3	0	2	14-117	4-96	+51	6	Advance to Leinster SHC Final
3	Wexford	5	2	2	1	8-106	4-98	+20	6	Advance to All-Ireland preliminary quarter-finals
4	Dublin	5	3	0	2	1-109	6-106	-12	6	
5	Westmeath	5	1	1	3	10-91	9-125	-31	3	
6	Laois	5	0	0	5	4-80	16-136	-92	0	Relegated to Joe McDonagh Cup

Antrim beat Kerry in the 2022 Joe McDonagh Cup final and were promoted to the 2023 Leinster Senior Hurling Championship. Laois were relegated to the 2023 Joe McDonagh Cup as they finished last in the 2022 Leinster Senior Hurling Championship.

== Group matches ==
=== Leinster round 1 ===
Sky Sports

16 April 2022
Round 1

Report

Wexford	1-19 – 1-19	Galway
Gls: C McDonald 1. Pts: R O’Connor 6 (4f), L Chin 5 (3f, 1 ’65), C McDonald 2, O Foley 2, M Fanning 1 (pen), S Donohoe 1, C Flood 1 C Dunbar 1.		Gls: B Concannon 1. Pts: C Cooney 8 (4f, 3 ’65), T Monaghan 4, C Whelan 2, J Cooney 2, D Morrissey 1, B Concannon 1, C Mannion 1.

Chadwicks Wexford Park, Wexford
Referee: T Walsh (Waterford)
Attendance: 10,200

16 April 2022
Round 1

Report

Westmeath	1-19 – 5-23	Kilkenny
Gls: O McCabe 1. Pts: K Doyle 14 (11f), J Boyle 2, N O’Brien 1, D Glennon 1, D Egerton 1.		Gls: TJ Reid 1, W Walsh 1, B Ryan 1, J Maher 1, M Carey 1. Pts: A Murphy 7 (6f), TJ Reid 4 (1 ‘65’, 2f), P Walsh 4, W Walsh 2, A Mullen 2, B Ryan 1, J Maher 1, C Kenny 1, E Cody 1

TEG Cusack Park, Mullingar
Referee: R McGann (Clare)

16 April 2022
Round 1

Report

Dublin	1-20 – 2-15	Laois
Gls: A Considine 1 (f). Pts: D Burke 13 (8f), F Whitely 3, J Madden 1, C Crummey 1, P Crummey 1, R Hayes 1.		Gls: E Rowland 1 (f), H Dowling 1. Pts: PJ Scully 8 (5f), E Rowland 2 (2f), J Keyes 2, R King 1, C Dwyer 1, A Corby 1

Parnell Park, Dublin
Referee: L Gordon (Galway)

=== Leinster round 2 ===
23 April 2022
Round 2

Report

Kilkenny	2-34 – 1-14	Laois
Gls: E Cody 1, T Phelan 1. Pts: TJ Reid 10 (7f), A Mullen 6, E Cody 5, W Walsh 4, P Walsh 4 J Donnelly 2, J Maher 2, T Phelan 1.		Gls: P Purcell 1. Pts: PJ Scully 4 (4f), P Purcell 2 (1f), C Dwyer 3, J Keyes 1, A Corby 1, C McEvoy 1, R Mullaney 1, C Byrne 1.

Nowlan Park, Kilkenny
Referee: L Gordon (Galway)

23 April 2022
Round 2

Report

Wexford	0-23 – 0-24	Dublin
Pts: L Chin 7 (6f, 1 65), R O’Connor 5 (4f), D Reck 3, M Fanning 3 (3f), C Flood 1, L O McGovern 1, C McDonald 1, S Donohoe 1, D O’Keeffe 1.		Pts: D Burke 12 (8f), R Hayes 2, F Whitley 2, C Burke 2, R Burke 2, E O’Donnell 1, D Ryan 1, C Crummey 1, A Mellett 1.

Chadwicks Wexford Park, Wexford
Referee: F Horgan (Tipperary)

23 April 2022
Round 2

Report

Galway	3-36 – 1-17	Westmeath
Gls: J Cooney 1, C Cooney 1 (pen), C Fahy 1. Pts: C Cooney 8 (5f) J Cooney 5, C Mannion 4, C Fahy 4, David Burke 3, B Concannon 2, G Lee 2, P Mannion 2, E Niland 2, T Monaghan 1, E Burke 1, F Burke 1, D Morrissey 1.		Gls: D McNicholas 1. Pts: K Doyle 14 (12f, 1 ’65), K Regan 1, D Glennon, J Bermingham 1.

Pearse Stadium, Galway
Referee: P Murphy (Carlow)

=== Leinster round 3 ===
1 May 2022
Round 3

Report

Laois	0-12 – 6-21	Wexford
(HT: 0-07 - 1-10)
Pts: PJ Scully 8 (8f); B McGinley 2; E Rowland 1, R Mullaney 1.		Gls: M Fanning 2 (2 pen), R O'Connor 1, D O'Keeffe 1, K Foley 1, C McDonald 1. Pts: L Chin 7 (4f, 1, ’65); R O’Connor 3; C McDonald 2; L Óg McGovern 2; M Fanning 1 (f); D O’Keeffe 1; C Devitt 1, D Reck 1, M O’Hanlon 1, J O’Connor 1, C Flood 1.

MW Hire O'Moore Park, Portlaoise
Referee: C Cunning (Antrim)

RTÉ2

1 May 2022
Round 3

Report

Galway	1-24 – 3-17	Kilkenny
(HT: 1-17 - 2-08)
Gls: J Coen 1. Pts: C Cooney 6 (fs), B Concannon 4, J Cooney 4, T Monaghan 3, C Mannion 2, F Burke 2 (two line cuts), P Mannion 1, David Burke 1, C Fahy 1.		Gls: E Cody 1, B Ryan 1, J Donnelly 1. Pts: A Murphy 5 (4fs), W Walsh 3, TJ Reid 3 (2fs), E Cody 2, P Walsh 2, M Carey 1, A Mullen 1.

Pearse Stadium, Galway
Referee: C Lyons (Cork)
Attendance: 14,034

1 May 2022
Round 3

Report

Westmeath	1-16 – 0-27	Dublin
Gls: N O'Brien 1. Pts: K Doyle 11 (10fs), N O Brien 3, K Regan 1, T Doyle 1.		Pts: D Burke 11 (7fs), R McBride 6, C Crummey 3, J Madden 2, F Whitely 2, C O’Callaghan 1, C Burke 1, D Sutcliffe 1.

TEG Cusack Park, Mullingar
Referee: S Cleere (Kilkenny)

=== Leinster round 4 ===
14 May 2022
Round 4

Report

Laois	0-21 – 2-37	Galway
(HT: 0-12 - 0-18)
Pts: R King 4 (3fs), P Purcell 4 (1f), C Dwyer 3, R King 3 (fs), J Keyes 3, E Rowland 1 (f), J Kelly 1, S Downey 1, T Keyes 1.		Gls: C Whelan 1, J Cooney 1. Pts: C Mannion 8, C Cooney 7 (5fs), T Monaghan 6, C Whelan 2, J Cooney 2, C Fahy 2, P Mannion 2, D Morrissey 2, E Murphy 1, B Concannon 1, J Grealish 1, F Burke 1, E Niland 1 (f), J Flynn 1.

MW Hire O'Moore Park, Portlaoise
Referee: S Cleere (Kilkenny)

14 May 2022
Round 4

Report

Westmeath	2-15 – 0-21	Wexford
Gls: D McNicholas 1, Mitchell 1. Pts: K Doyle 11 (9f, 1 ’65), A Craig 1, D Glennon 1, N O’Brien 1, K Regan 1.		Pts: L Chin 9 (7f), L Óg McGovern 2, O Foley 2, S Donohoe 2, C McDonald 2, R O’Connor 2, P Morris 1, C Hearne 1.

TEG Cusack Park, Mullingar
Referee: S Hynes (Galway)

Sky Sports

14 May 2022
Round 4

Report

Dublin	0-17 – 3-25	Kilkenny
(HT: 0-11 - 1-11)
Pts: D Burke 9 (7f), C Burke 2, E Dillon 1, F Whitely 1, C Crummey 1, D Gray 1, R McBride 1, M Schutte 1.		Gls: M Keoghan 2, TJ Reid 1. Pts: TJ Reid 7 (5f), A Mullen 5, C Kenny 4, A Murphy 3, E Cody 2, B Ryan 1, J Donnelly 1, C Buckley 1, M Keoghan 1.

Parnell Park, Dublin
Referee: T Walsh (Waterford)
Attendance: 8,750

=== Leinster round 5 ===
Sky Sports

21 May 2022
Round 5

Report

Kilkenny	1-18 – 1-22	Wexford
(HT: 1-08 - 1-11)
Gls: M Keoghan 1. Pts: TJ Reid 10 (8f, 1 65); M Carey 2, A Mullen 2; M Keoghan 1; W Walsh 1, B Ryan 1 (l/b), P Walsh 1.		Gls: O Foley 1 Pts: L Chin 0-9 (7fs); D O’Keeffe 2, R O’Connor 2, S Donohoe 2; C McDonald 1, L Og McGovern 1, J O’Connor 1, L Ryan 1, M Dwyer 1, C Flood 1, C Dunbar 1.

Nowlan Park, Kilkenny
Referee: F Horgan (Tipperary)
Attendance: 13,565

21 May 2022
Round 5

Report

Galway	0-27 – 0-21	Dublin
(HT: 0-15 - 0-11)
Pts: C Cooney 13 (12f), C Whelan 5, C Mannion 3, J Cooney 2, F Burke 2 (1 sideline), B Concannon 1, C Fahy 1.		Pts: D Burke 14 (9f), R McBride 2, C Burke 1, C Crummey 1, D Sutcliffe 1, E Dillon 1, P Crummey 1.

Pearse Stadium, Galway
Referee: J Murphy (Limerick)
Attendance: 10,583

21 May 2022
Round 5

Report

Laois	1-18 – 5-24	Westmeath
(HT: 1-14 - 1-14)
Gls: P Purcell 1. Pts: R King 7 (4fs) E Rowland 4 (4fs), J Keyes 2, B Conroy 2, C Dwyer 1, P Purcell 1, P Dunne 1		Gls: E Keyes 2, N Mitchell 2, N O'Brien 1. Pts: K Doyle 8 (4fs), J Boyle 4, N O’Brien 3, D Glennon 3, J Galvin 2, C Boyle 1, J Gillen 1, E Keyes 1, A Craig 1.

MW Hire O'Moore Park, Portlaoise
Referee: C Cunning (Antrim)

== Leinster Final ==
RTÉ 2

4 June 2022
19:00
Final

Report

Galway	0-17 – 0-22	Kilkenny
(HT: 0-09 - 0-11)
Pts: C Cooney 9 (5f, 2 65, 1 sideline), C Whelan 4, C Fahy 2, F Burke 1, P Mannion 1 (1f)		Pts: TJ Reid 12 (11f, 1 65), A Mullen 4, P Deegan 2, B Ryan 1, M Keoghan 1, P Walsh 1

Croke Park, Dublin
Referee: J Owens (Wexford)
Attendance: 25,951

Kilkenny advanced to the 2022 All-Ireland SHC Semi-Finals, while Galway advanced to the 2022 All-Ireland SHC Quarter-Finals.

== See also ==
- 2022 All-Ireland Senior Hurling Championship
- 2022 Munster Senior Hurling Championship
- 2022 Joe McDonagh Cup
- Leinster Senior Hurling Championship
