= 1984 Munster Senior Hurling Championship final =

1984 Munster Senior Hurling Final
- Event: 1984 Munster Senior Hurling Championship
Cork	Tipperary
4-15	3-14
- Date: 15 July 1984
- Venue: Semple Stadium, Thurles
- Referee: J. Moore (Waterford)
- Attendance: 50,093

The 1984 Munster Senior Hurling Championship final was a hurling match played on Sunday 15 July 1984 at Semple Stadium. It was contested by Cork and Tipperary. Cork, captained by John Fenton, claimed the title, beating Tipperary on a scoreline of 4–15 to 3–14.

== Match ==
=== Summary ===
Regarded at the time as the 'best ever', the 1984 Munster final was a fitting game to celebrate the centenary year of the GAA. The game was a classic encounter, however, the final seven minutes have entered Munster folklore. Cork trailed Tipp by four points with seven minutes left and the game looked lost. John Fenton launched the comeback with a point before Tony O'Sullivan sent the sliotar crashing into the net for an equalizing goal. A draw seemed likely, however, a Tipp attack was halted and turned into a Cork one. O'Sullivan tried for the winning point, however, his shot was stopped by the goalkeeper only to fall to the hurley of Seánie O'Leary who scored the winning goal. John Fenton tacked on an insurance point to give Cork the centenary year Munster title.

=== Details ===
15 July
Final
3:45 pm

Tipperary	3–14 – 4–15	Cork
S. Power (1–6), D. O'Connell (1–2), N. English (1–0), N. O'Dwyer (0–2), P. Kennedy (0–2), P. Dooley (0–1), L. Maher (0–1).		J. Fenton (0–7), J. Barry-Murphy (2–0), S. O'Leary (1–1), T. O'Sullivan (1–0), P. Horgan (0–3), K. Hennessy (0–3), P. Hartnett (0–1).

Semple Stadium, Thurles
Attendance: 50,093
Referee: J. Moore (Waterford)
