= 2022 Leinster Senior Hurling Championship final =

Hurling match

2022 Leinster Senior Hurling final
- Event: 2022 Leinster Senior Hurling Championship
Galway	Kilkenny
0–17	0–22
- Date: 4 June 2022
- Venue: Croke Park, Dublin
- Man of the Match: Mikey Butler
- Referee: James Owens (Wexford)
- Weather: Sunny

The 2022 Leinster Senior Hurling Championship final was the deciding game of the 2022 Leinster Senior Hurling Championship, a hurling match that was played on 4 June at Croke Park, Dublin. It was contested by defending champions Kilkenny and Galway. Kilkenny captained by Richie Reid won their 74th Leinster title running out winners 0–22 to 0–17.

== Details ==
RTÉ 2

4 June 2022
19:00
Final

Report

Galway	0–17 – 0–22	Kilkenny
(HT: 0-09 – 0–11)
Pts: C Cooney 9 (5f, 2 65, 1 sideline), C Whelan 4, C Fahy 2, F Burke 1, P Mannion 1 (1f)		Pts: TJ Reid 12 (11f, 1 65), A Mullen 4, P Deegan 2, B Ryan 1, M Keoghan 1, P Walsh 1

Croke Park, Dublin
Referee: J Owens (Wexford)
Attendance: 25,951
