= Dick Stokes (hurler) =

Irish hurler

Personal information
- Native name: Risteard Stóc (Irish)
- Born: 12 March 1920 Oola, County Limerick, Ireland
- Died: 17 November 2005 (aged 85) Nenagh, County Tipperary, Ireland
- Occupation: Doctor
- Height: 5 ft 10 in (178 cm)

Sport
- Sport: Hurling
- Position: Left wing-forward
Clubs
- Years: Club
- Pallasgreen; UCD
Club titles
	Football	Hurling
Dublin titles	1	2
Inter-county
- Years: County
- 1940–1953: Limerick
Inter-county titles
- Munster titles: 1
- All-Irelands: 1
- NHL: 1

Richard Stokes (12 March 1920 – 17 November 2005) was an Irish hurler who played as a left wing-forward for the Limerick senior team.

Born in Oola, County Limerick, Stokes first played competitive hurling whilst at school in Doon CBS. He arrived on the inter-county scene as a dual player with the Limerick minor hurling and football teams. He made his senior hurling debut in the 1940 championship. Stokes went on to win one All-Ireland SHC medal, one Munster SHC medal and one National Hurling League medal while playing for Limerick.

As a member of the Munster inter-provincial team at various times throughout his career, Stokes won five Railway Cup medals. At club level he won two hurling championship medals and one football championship medal with University College Dublin.

His retirement came following the conclusion of the 1953 championship.

In retirement from playing, Stokes became involved in team management and coaching. As selector to the Limerick senior team, he helped guide the team to the All-Ireland SHC title in 1973.

== Playing career ==
=== Colleges ===
Stokes first played in goal for the Doon CBS secondary school team in the Dr Harty Cup.

In 1938 he was moved to midfield and was a reserve on the Munster colleges team.

The following year Stokes partnered Vin Baston at midfield in the All-Ireland colleges decider and played a key part in bringing the title back to Munster.

=== University ===
During his studies at University College Dublin, Stokes played on both the university's hurling and football teams.

He first experienced success on the hurling field in 1941. A 2-8 to 2-4 defeat of University College Galway and a 7-10 to 3-1 win over University College Cork gave Stokes his first Fitzgibbon Cup medal. Three years later in 1944, UCD made a clean sweep of the series once again, giving Stokes, who was now captain of the team, a second Fitzgibbon Cup medal.

In 1945, Stokes was named at full-forward on the UCD football team. A 3-8 to 0-2 defeat of UCC gave him a Sigerson Cup medal.

=== Club ===
Stokes began his playing career with Pallasgreen; however, it was as a dual player with University College Dublin in the Dublin county championships that he experienced his greatest successes.

In 1943, UCD's senior football team reached the final of the county club championship. A 1-8 to 1-6 defeat of Seán McDermott's gave Stokes a Dublin Senior Football Championship medal.

Four years later in 1947, Stokes was on the UCD hurling team lined out against Faughs in the county decider. A 6-12 to 4-9 of the hurling kingpins of Dublin, gave Stokes a championship medal in the small ball code. UC retained the title the following year.

=== Inter-county ===
Stokes first appeared on the inter-county scene as a dual player at minor level; however, he experienced little success.

In 1940, Stokes made his debut for the Limerick senior hurling team in a tournament game against Cork. He was subsequently included on the Limerick championship team, and made his debut in a drawn Munster semi-final against Waterford. It took two late goals from Jackie Power and a storming display by Mick Mackey to level the game. Another late rally gave Limerick a victory in the subsequent replay. Stokes's side put in another excellent performance in the Munster final to draw the game with Cork. At half-time in the replay Limerick looked like a spent force. Held scoreless for the entire thirty minutes, team captain Mick Mackey got the recovery underway in the second-half with a point from a seventy. He later moved back to the defence where Cork were running riot with goals. A pitch invasion scuppered the game for ten minutes, however, Limerick held on to win by 3-3 to 2-4 and Stoke collected a Munster SHC medal. The subsequent All-Ireland SHC decider on 1 September 1940 brought Kilkenny and Limerick together for the last great game between the two outstanding teams of the decade. Early in the second-half Kilkenny took a four-point lead; however, once Mick Mackey was deployed at midfield he proceeded to dominate the game. Limerick hung on to win the game on a score line of 3-7 to 1-7. The win gave Stokes an All-Ireland SHC medal.

Limerick took a back seat to Cork and Tipperary in the Munster series of games for the next few years.

In 1947, Stokes won a National Hurling League medal as Limerick defeated Kilkenny by 3-8 to 1-7 following an earlier drawn game.

Stokes also lined out with the Limerick junior football team. In 1950, he won a Munster JFC medal following a 3-6 to 1-6 defeat of Cork.
