= Mikey Butler =

Irish hurler

Personal information
- Native name: Mícheál de Buitléir (Irish)
- Born: 4 February 2000 (age 26) Kilkenny, Ireland
- Occupation: Farm manager
- Height: 5 ft 6 in (168 cm)

Sport
- Sport: Hurling
- Position: Right corner-back
Club
- Years: Club
- O'Loughlin Gaels
Club titles
- Kilkenny titles: 0
College
- Years: College
- Waterford Institute of Technology
College titles
- Fitzgibbon titles: 0
Inter-county*
Years	County	Apps (scores)
2022-	Kilkenny	3 (0-00)
Inter-county titles
- Leinster titles: 2
- All-Irelands: 0
- NHL: 0
- All Stars: 2
- *Inter County team apps and scores correct as of 22:28, 25 March 2022.

Michael Butler (born 4 February 2000) is an Irish hurler who plays for Kilkenny Senior Championship club O'Loughlin Gaels and at inter-county level with the Kilkenny senior hurling team. He usually lines out as a right corner-back.

== Career ==
Butler played hurling at juvenile and underage levels with the O'Loughlin Gaels club, while simultaneously lining out as a schoolboy with CBS Kilkenny. After securing minor and under-21 titles, he eventually progressed on the club's senior team and lined out in the 2021 Kilkenny SHC final defeat by Ballyhale Shamrocks. Butler first appeared on the inter-county scene as a member of the Kilkenny minor hurling team that won the Leinster MHC title in 2017, before subsequently winning a Leinster U20 title in 2019. He made his Kilkenny senior hurling team debut during the 2022 National Hurling League.

== Career statistics ==
As of 20 March 2022.

Team	Year	National League			Leinster		All-Ireland		Total	
Team	Year	Division	Apps	Score	Apps	Score	Apps	Score	Apps	Score
Kilkenny	2022	Division 1B	5	0-00	0	0-00	0	0-00	5	0-00
Career total			5	0-00	0	0-00	0	0-00	5	0-00

== Honours ==
O'Loughlin Gaels

- Kilkenny Under-21 Hurling Championship: 2019
- Kilkenny Minor Hurling Championship: 2017

Kilkenny

- Leinster Senior Hurling Championship: 2022
- Leinster Under-20 Hurling Championship: 2019
- Leinster Minor Hurling Championship: 2017

Awards

- All-Star Award (2): 2022, 2023
- GAA-GPA Young Hurler of the Year (1): 2022
