= 1957 Limerick Senior Hurling Championship =

Annual hurling competition season

- Champions: Claughaun (6th title); Dermot Kelly (captain)
- Runners-up: St. Patrick's

The 1957 Limerick Senior Hurling Championship was the 63rd staging of the Limerick Senior Hurling Championship since its establishment by the Limerick County Board in 1887.

Cappamore were the defending champions, however, they were defeated by St. Patrick's.

On 29 September 1957, Claughaun won the championship after a 7–07 to 3–02 defeat of St Patrick's in the final. It was their sixth championship title overall and their first championship title since 1926.

== Results ==
=== Final ===
29 September 1957 Final	Claughaun	7–07 – 3–02	St. Patrick's	Gaelic Grounds, Limerick
