= 1984 All-Ireland Senior Hurling Championship =

Championship details
- Dates: 27 May – 2 September 1984
- Teams: 13

All-Ireland champions
- Winning team: Cork (25th win)
- Captain: John Fenton
- Manager: Fr. Michael O'Brien; Justin McCarthy

All-Ireland Finalists
- Losing team: Offaly
- Captain: Pat Fleury
- Manager: Dermot Healy

Provincial champions
- Munster: Cork
- Leinster: Offaly
- Ulster: Not Played
- Connacht: Not Played

Championship statistics
- No. matches played: 12
- Goals total: 50 (4.16 per game)
- Points total: 317 (26.41 per game)
- Top Scorer: John Fenton (1–33)
- Player of the Year: John Fenton
- All-Star Team: See here

The All-Ireland Senior Hurling Championship 1984 was the 98th series of the All-Ireland Senior Hurling Championship, Ireland's premier hurling knock-out competition. Cork won the championship, beating Offaly 3–16 to 1–12 in the centenary year final at Semple Stadium, Thurles.

== Centenary year ==
1984 was a special year in the annals of Gaelic games as it was the centenary of the foundation of the Gaelic Athletic Association. Because of this a series of events celebrating the occasion were planned to take place throughout the year. The festivities were officially launched on 18 March at the Michael Cusack cottage in Carron, County Clare. Ash trees were planted to mark the occasion and a plaque was also unveiled in memory of the founder of the association. The Railway Cup finals were later played in Cusack Park, Ennis.

A £100,000 film was also commissioned by the centenary committee. Made by Louis Marcus the film was designed to be a portrait rather than a chronological history of the GAA.

One of the biggest events during the centenary celebrations was the staging of the All-Ireland final in Semple Stadium, Thurles. It was the first time since 1937 that the championship decider did not take place in Croke Park. The staging of the game in Thurles was a gesture to the cradle-town of the GAA and to the county regarded as 'the home of hurling'.

== Pre-championship ==
Prior to the opening of the championship Kilkenny were installed as the favourites to retain the All-Ireland title for a third consecutive year. The last time they achieved this was in 1913, however, no final took place that year and Kilkenny were awarded the title as Limerick refused to play. Since then they failed to capture the 'three-in-a-row', in spite of having the opportunity in 1933 and again in 1976. Cork, the defeated All-Ireland finalists in 1982 and 1983, were regarded as the biggest threat to Kilkenny's ambitions. 1984 also provided Cork with the dubious honour of becoming the first team to lose three All-Ireland finals in-a-row. National League champions Limerick and newcomers Offaly were also regarded as teams that would make life difficult for the reigning champions.

== Team changes ==
=== To Championship ===
Promoted from the All-Ireland Senior B Hurling Championship

- None

=== From Championship ===
Relegated to the All-Ireland Senior B Hurling Championship

- Kerry

Note: Westmeath regraded to Senior B championship but won the championship and re-qualified for the All-Ireland championship.

== Teams ==
A total of thirteen teams contested the championship, a reduction of one team from the 1983 championship and one new entrant.

The Leinster championship was reduced to five teams as Westmeath declined to take part and instead decided to field a team in the All-Ireland Senior B Hurling Championship. 'The Lakelanders' went on to win that championship and qualified for the All-Ireland quarter-final.

Once again the five traditional hurling teams contested the Munster championship.

Antrim and Galway, two teams who faced no competition in their respective provinces, entered the championship at the All-Ireland semi-final stage.

=== General information ===
Thirteen counties will compete in the All-Ireland Senior Hurling Championship: one team from the Connacht Senior Hurling Championship, five teams in the Leinster Senior Hurling Championship, five teams in the Munster Senior Hurling Championship, one team from the Ulster Senior Hurling Championship and one team from the All-Ireland Senior B Hurling Championship.

County	Last provincial title	Last championship title	Position in 1983 Championship	Current championship
Antrim	1946	—		Ulster Senior Hurling Championship
Clare	1932	1914		Munster Senior Hurling Championship
Cork	1983	1978		Munster Senior Hurling Championship
Dublin	1961	1938		Leinster Senior Hurling Championship
Galway	1922	1980		Connacht Senior Hurling Championship
Kilkenny	1983	1983		Leinster Senior Hurling Championship
Laois	1949	1915		Leinster Senior Hurling Championship
Limerick	1981	1973		Munster Senior Hurling Championship
Offaly	1981	1981		Leinster Senior Hurling Championship
Tipperary	1971	1971		Munster Senior Hurling Championship
Waterford	1963	1959		Munster Senior Hurling Championship
Westmeath	—	—		All-Ireland Senior B Hurling Championship
Wexford	1977	1968		Leinster Senior Hurling Championship

=== Stadia and locations ===
Team	Grounds		
Team	Grounds	Antrim	Casement Park
Clare	Cusack Park		
Cork	Cork Athletic Grounds		
Dublin	Parnell Park		
Galway	Pearse Stadium		
Kilkenny	Nowlan Park		
Laois	O'Moore Park		
Limerick	Gaelic Grounds		
Offaly	St. Brendan's Park		
Tipperary	Semple Stadium		
Waterford	Walsh Park		
Westmeath	Cusack Park		
Wexford	Wexford Park		

== Format ==
Munster Championship

Quarter-final: (1 match) This was a lone match between the first two teams drawn from the province of Munster. One team was eliminated at this stage, while the winners advanced to the semi-finals.

Semi-finals: (2 matches) The winners of the lone quarter-final joined the other three Munster teams to make up the semi-final pairings. Two teams were eliminated at this stage, while two teams advanced to the final.

Final: (1 match) The winners of the two semi-finals contested this game. One team was eliminated at this stage, while the winners advanced to the All-Ireland semi-final.

Leinster Championship

Quarter-final: (1 match) This was a lone match between the first two teams drawn from the province of Leinster. One team was eliminated at this stage, while the winners advanced to the semi-finals.

Semi-finals: (2 matches) The winners of the lone quarter-final joined the other three Leinster teams to make up the semi-final pairings. Two teams were eliminated at this stage, while two teams advanced to the final.

Final: (1 match) The winner of the two semi-finals contested this game. One team was eliminated at this stage, while the winners advanced to the All-Ireland semi-final.

All-Ireland Championship

Quarter-final: (1 match) This was a lone match between Galway and the All-Ireland 'B' champions. One team was eliminated at this stage, while the winners advanced to the All-Ireland semi-final where they played the Leinster champions.

Semi-finals: (2 matches) The winners of the lone quarter-final joined the Leinster and Munster champions and Antrim to make up the semi-final pairings. The Munster and Leinster champions were on opposite sides of the draw. Two teams were eliminated at this stage, while two teams advanced to the final.

Final: (1 match) The two semi-final winners contested the final.

== Provincial championships ==
=== Leinster Senior Hurling Championship ===
Quarter-final
Kilkenny	4–15
Laois	1–16

Semi-finals
Offaly	2–11
Dublin	1–11
Wexford	3–10
Kilkenny	1–13

Leinster final
Offaly	1–15
Wexford	2–11

27 May 1984
Quarter-Final
3:30 pm

Kilkenny	4–15 – 1–16	Laois
B. Fitzpatrick (1–6), L. Fenelly (2–0), C. Heffernan (1–1), H. Ryan (0–3), R. Power (0–2), D. Carroll (0–1), G. Fennelly (0–1), K. Brennan (0–1).		B. Bohane (0–12), P. O'Brien (1–1), M. Walsh (0–1), P. J. Cuddy (0–1), M. Cuddy (0–1).

Dr. Cullen Park, Carlow
Attendance: 15,000
Referee: N. O'Donoghue (Dublin)

17 June 1984
Semi-Final
1:45 pm

Offaly	2–11 – 1–11	Dublin
B. Bermingham (1–1), P. Kirwan (1–0), P. Corrigan (0–3), J. Kelly (0–3), D. Fogarty (0–1), P. Carroll (0–1), A. Fogarty (0–1), T. Conneely (0–1).		J. Towell (1–1), L. Walsh (0–4), J. Twomey (0–2), E. O'Shea (0–2), G. Hogarty (0–1), V. Holden (0–1).

Croke Park, Dublin
Attendance: 33,061
Referee: P. Delaney (Laois)

17 June 1984
Semi-Final
3:30 pm

Wexford	3–10 – 1–13	Kilkenny
M. Fitzhenry (2–3), T. Doran (1–2), T. Harrington (0–2), S. Kinsella (0–1), J. Conran (0–1), J. Houlihan (0–1).		B. Fitzpatrick (0–5), C. Heffernan (1–1), K. Brennan (0–3), H. Ryan (0–2), R. Heffernan (0–1), R. Power (0–1).

Croke Park, Dublin
Attendance: 33,061
Referee: G. Kirwan (Offaly)

8 July 1984
Final
3:30 pm

Offaly	1–15 – 2–11	Wexford
P. Horan (1–1), T. Conneely (0–3), P. Corrigan (0–3), J. Dooley (0–2), P. Carroll (0–2), M. Corrigan (0–1), B. Keeshan (0–1), D. Fogarty (0–1), A. Fogarty (0–1).		B. Byrne (1–1), J. Murphy (1–0), S. Kinsella (0–2), G. O'Connor (0–2), T. Harrington (0–1), P. Courtney (0–1), J. McDonald (0–1), M. Quigley (0–1), M. Fitzhenry (0–1), T. Doran (0–1).

Croke Park, Dublin
Attendance: 30,016
Referee: P. Long (Kilkenny)

=== Munster Senior Hurling Championship ===
Quarter-final
Clare	0–15
Waterford	2–8

Semi-finals
Cork	3–15
Limerick	2–13
Tipperary	1–15
Clare	2–11

Munster final
Cork	4–15
Tipperary	3–14

27 May 1984
Quarter-Final
3:45 pm

Clare	0–15 – 2–8	Waterford
C. Lyons (0–8), T. Guilfoyle (0–3), J. Callinan (0–3), G. McInerney (0–1).		E. Rockett (2–0), P. Curran (0–2), P. Ryan (0–2), M. Walsh (0–1), C. Curley (0–1), S. Aherne (0–1), M. Walsh (0–1).

Semple Stadium, Thurles
Attendance: 5,200
Referee: W. Horgan (Cork)

3 June 1984
Semi-Final
3:45 pm

Limerick	2–13 – 3–15	Cork
P. Kelly (0–6), J. McKenna (1–1), M. Rea (1–1), O. O'Connor (0–2), M. Carroll (0–1), A. Garvey (0–1), D. Fitzgerald (0–1).		J. Fenton (1–7), J. Barry-Murphy (1–2), S. O'Leary (1–1), P. Hartnett (0–2), D. Walsh (0–1), T. Crowley (0–1), K. Hennessy (0–1).

Gaelic Grounds, Limerick
Attendance: 32,343
Referee: J. J. Landers (Waterford)

17 June 1984
Semi-Final
3:45 pm

Tipperary	1–15 – 2–11	Clare
S. Power (0–5), L. Maher (1–1), N. English (0–4), N. O'Dwyer (0–2), P. Fitzelle (0–2), D. O'Connell (0–1).		G. McInerney (2–0), C. Lyons (0–5), J. Callinan (0–3), E. O'Connor (0–1), C. Honan (0–1), J. Shanahan (0–1).

Semple Stadium, Thurles
Attendance: 18,105
Referee: N. Duggan (Limerick)

15 July 1984
Final
3:45 pm

Tipperary	3–14 – 4–15	Cork
S. Power (1–6), D. O'Connell (1–2), N. English (1–0), N. O'Dwyer (0–2), P. Kennedy (0–2), P. Dooley (0–1), L. Maher (0–1).		J. Fenton (0–7), J. Barry-Murphy (2–0), S. O'Leary (1–1), T. O'Sullivan (1–0), P. Horgan (0–3), K. Hennessy (0–3), P. Hartnett (0–1).

Semple Stadium, Thurles
Attendance: 50,093
Referee: J. Moore (Waterford)

== All-Ireland Senior Hurling Championship ==
Quarter-final
Galway	2–17
Westmeath	2–8

Semi-finals
Cork	3–26
Antrim	2–5
Offaly	4–15
Galway	1–10

All-Ireland final
Cork	3–16
Offaly	1–12

=== All-Ireland quarter-finals ===
22 July
Quarter-Final
3:30 pm

Galway	2–17 – 2–8	Westmeath
M. McGrath (1–4), J. Connolly (0–5), P. J. Molloy (1–1), F. Gantley (0–2), N. Lane (0–2), J. Boland (0–1), A. Staunton (0–1), J. Ryan (0–1).		D. Kilcoyne (2–2), E. Gallagher (0–2), D. McCormack (0–2), M. Cosgrave (0–1), M. Kilcoyne (0–1).

St. Brendan's Park, Birr
Attendance: 4,559
Referee: N. Duggan (Limerick)

=== All-Ireland semi-finals ===
5 August
Semi-Final
3:30 pm

Cork	3–26 – 2–5	Antrim
J. Fenton (0–12), K. Hennessy (1–2), T. Crowley (1–2), J. Crowley (1–0), T. O'Sullivan (0–3), D. Walsh (0–3), P. Hartnett (0–2), J. Buckley (0–1), J. Barry-Murphy (0–1).		D. McNaughton (1–2), C. Donnelly (1–0), B. Donnelly (0–3).

Croke Park, Dublin
Attendance: 2,343
Referee: P. Long (Kilkenny)

5 August
Semi-Final
3:45 pm

Offaly	4–15 – 1–10	Galway
J. Dooley (2–3), P. Horan (2–2), P. Corrigan (0–3), M. Corrigan (0–2), P. Carroll (0–2), B. Bermingham (0–1), P. Delaney (0–1), T. Conneeley (0–1).		S. Mahon (1–0), M. McGrath (0–3), P. J. Molloy (0–3), J. Ryan (0–1), N. Lane (0–1), S. Silke (0–1), M. Connolly (0–1).

Semple Stadium, Thurles
Attendance: 18,708
Referee: J. J. Landers (Waterford)

=== All-Ireland Final ===
2 September
Final
3:30 pm

Cork	3–16 – 1–12	Offaly
S. O’Leary (2–1), J. Fenton (0–7), T. O’Sullivan (0–6), K. Hennessy (1–0), T. Mulcahy (0–1), P. Hartnett (0–1)		M. Corrigan (1–2), P. Carroll (0–4), P. Delaney (0–4), P. Horan (0–2)

Semple Stadium, Thurles
Attendance: 59,814
Referee: P. Long (Kilkenny)

== Championship statistics ==
=== Scoring ===
- Widest winning margin: 24 points
  - Cork 3–16 : Antrim 2–5 (All-Ireland-final, 5 August 1984)
- Most goals in a match: 7
  - Cork 4–15 : Tipperary 3–14 (Munster final, 15 July 1984)
- Most points in a match: 31
  - Kilkenny 4–15 : Laois 1–16 (Leinster quarter-final, 27 May 1984)
  - Cork 3–16 : Antrim 2–5 (All-Ireland-final, 5 August 1984)

=== Top scorers ===
Overall

Rank	Player	County	Tally	Total	Matches	Average
1	John Fenton	Cork	1–33	36	4	9.00
2	Seánie O'Leary	Cork	4–3	15	3	5.00
3	Pádraig Horan	Offaly	3–5	14	4	3.50
3	Séamus Power	Tipperary	1–11	14	2	7.00
3	Billy Fitzpatrick	Kilkenny	1–11	14	2	7.00
6	Cyril Lyons	Clare	0-13	13	2	6.50
7	Jimmy Barry-Murphy	Cork	3-3	12	4	3.00
7	Kevin Hennessy	Cork	2-6	12	4	3.00
7	Tony O'Sullivan	Cork	1-9	12	3	4.00
7	Billy Bohane	Laois	0-12	12	1	12.00

Single game

Rank	Player	County	Tally	Total	Opposition
1	John Fenton	Cork	0–12	12	Antrim
1	Billy Bohane	Laois	0–12	12	Kilkenny
3	John Fenton	Cork	1–7	10	Limerick
4	Billy Fitzpatrick	Kilkenny	1–6	9	Laois
4	Séamus Power	Tipperary	1–6	9	Cork
4	Martin Fitzhenry	Wexford	2–3	9	Kilkenny
4	Joe Dooley	Offaly	2–3	9	Galway
8	Cyril Lyons	Clare	0–8	8	Waterford
8	David Kilcoyne	Westmeath	2–2	8	Galway
8	Pádraig Horan	Offaly	2–2	8	Galway

== Broadcasting ==
The following matches were broadcast live on television in Ireland on RTÉ.

Round	RTÉ
All-Ireland semi-final	Offaly vs Galway
All-Ireland final	Offaly vs Cork

== Sources ==
- Corry, Eoghan, The GAA Book of Lists (Hodder Headline Ireland, 2005).
- Donegan, Des, The Complete Handbook of Gaelic Games (DBA Publications Limited, 2005).
- Nolan, Pat, Flashbacks: A Half Century of Cork Hurling (The Collins Press, 2000).
