= 2022 Munster Senior Hurling Championship final =

- Event: 2022 Munster Senior Hurling Championship
| Limerick | Clare |
| 1–29 | 0–29 |
- Date: 5 June 2022
- Venue: Semple Stadium, Thurles
- Man of the Match: Séamus Flanagan
- Referee: J Keenan (Wicklow)
- Attendance: 43,112
- Weather: Rain with dry spells

The 2022 Munster Senior Hurling Championship final was a hurling match that was played on 5 June at Semple Stadium in Thurles. It was contested by defending champions Limerick and Clare.

The game was televised live on RTÉ 2 as part of The Sunday Game, presented by Joanne Cantwell. Commentary on the game was provided by Marty Morrissey alongside Michael Duignan.

Limerick, captained by Declan Hannon, retained the title for the fourth year in a row after a 1-19 to 0-29 win after extra-time. The teams had been level on 14 occasions during the ninety minutes.

== Build-up ==
The winning team were the first winners of the new Mick Mackey Cup. The two teams were meeting in the Munster final for the first time since 1995.

Limerick were bidding to win the Munster title for a fourth successive year with Clare looking for a first Munster title since 1998. This was the 60th championship game between the two counties, Limerick had 37 wins to Clare’s 20 with two draws, from the previous 59.

On 26 May, the Munster Council confirmed that the final was a sell-out after 11,000 Terrace Tickets sold out in 11 minutes.

== Match ==
=== Details ===
RTÉ2

5 June 2022
16:00
Final

Report

| Clare | 0–29 – 1–29 (a.e.t.) | Limerick |
|---|---|---|
(HT: 0–14 - 1–11) (FT: 0–24 - 1–21)
| Pts: T Kelly 13 (5f, 1 sideline), D Fitzgerald 5, P Duggan 4 (3f, 1 sideline), R Taylor 3, M Rodgers 2 (1f), I Galvin 1, S Meehan 1. | | Gls: G Hegarty 1. Pts: A Gillane 10 (7f), S Flanagan 8, T Morrissey 3, C O’Neill 2, D Byrnes 1 (f), D Hannon 1, D O’Donovan 1, C Boylan 1, D Reidy 1, W O'Donoghue 1. |

Semple Stadium, Thurles
Referee: J Keenan (Wicklow)
Attendance: 43,112
