= John Grogan (hurler) =

Irish hurler

Personal information
- Native name: Seán Ó Gruagáin (Irish)
- Born: 1956 (age 69–70) Cashel, County Tipperary, Ireland

Sport
- Sport: Hurling
- Position: Full-forward
Clubs
- Years: Club
- Cashel King Cormacs; Ballyhea
Club titles
- Tipperary titles: 1
- Munster titles: 1
- All-Ireland Titles: 0
Inter-county
Years	County	Apps (scores)
1976-1983	Tipperary	6 (4-29)
Inter-county titles
- Munster titles: 0
- All-Irelands: 0
- NHL: 0
- All Stars: 0

John Grogan (born 1956 in Cashel, County Tipperary, Ireland) is an Irish retired hurler who played as a full-forward for the Tipperary senior team.

A dual player in the minor and under-21 grades, Grogan made his first appearance for the Tipperary senior team in the 1976 championship. He was a semi-regular member of the team over much of the next decade. During that time he failed to land any honours as his inter-county career coincided with a sharp downturn in Tipperary's fortunes.

At club level Grogan is a Munster and county club championship medalist with Cashel King Cormac's. He also played with Ballyhea in Cork.
