= Paddy Ryan (hurler) =

Irish hurler (1912–1991)

Paddy "Sweeper" Ryan
Personal information
- Native name: Pádraig Ó Riain (Irish)
- Nickname: Sweeper
- Born: 1 April 1912 Two-Mile-Borris, County Tipperary
- Died: 31 December 1991 (aged 79) Littleton, County Tipperary

Sport
- Sport: Hurling
- Position: Left corner-forward
Club
- Years: Club
- Moycarkey–Borris
Club titles
- Tipperary titles: 5
Inter-county
- Years: County
- 1934-1945: Tipperary
Inter-county titles
- Munster titles: 2
- All-Irelands: 1
- NHL: 0

Paddy "Sweeper" Ryan (1 April 1912 – 31 December 1991) was an Irish hurler who played as a left corner-forward for the Tipperary senior team.

Ryan made his first appearance for the team during the 1934 championship and was a regular member of the starting fifteen until his retirement after the 1945 championship. During that time he won two All-Ireland medals and one Munster medal.

At club level Ryan was a five-time county championship medalist with Moycarkey–Borris.
