= 2022 Munster Senior Hurling Championship =

Hurling Championship

Munster Senior Hurling Championship
Tournament details
- Year: 2022
- Trophy: The Mick Mackey Cup
- Date: 17 April – 5 June 2022
- Teams: 5
- Defending champions: Limerick

Winners
- Champions: Limerick (23rd win)
- Manager: John Kiely
- Captain: Declan Hannon
- Qualify for: Munster SHC Final; All-Ireland SHC

Runners-up
- Runners-up: Clare
- Captain: Tony Kelly

Other
- Matches played: 11
- Website: https://munster.gaa.ie/

The 2022 Munster Senior Hurling Championship was the 2022 installment of the annual Munster Senior Hurling Championship organised by Munster GAA. Limerick entered the competition as defending champions and won their 4th Munster Championship title in succession.

== Group stage ==
=== Table ===
Pos	Team	Pld	W	D	L	SF	SA	Diff	Pts	Qualification Notes
1	Clare	4	3	1	0	6-104	7-79	+22	7	Advance to Munster SHC Final
2	Limerick	4	3	1	0	6-97	3-85	+21	7	Advance to Munster SHC Final
3	Cork	4	2	0	2	8-89	4-96	+5	4	Advance to All-Ireland preliminary quarter-finals
4	Waterford	4	1	0	3	7-86	7-103	-17	2	
5	Tipperary	4	0	0	4	5-83	11-96	-31	0	

=== Munster round 1 ===
17 April 2022 Round 1	Waterford	2-24 – 2-20	Tipperary	Waterford
14:00		(HT: 0-12 - 1-11)		Venue: Walsh Park
	Gls: D Hutchinson 1, M Kiely 1. Pts: Stephen Bennett 10 (fs), P Curran 4, D Hutchinson 3, S McNulty 2, J Barron 2, A Gleeson 2, J Prendergast 1.	Report	Gls: M Kehoe 2 Pts: N McGrath 6 (2f), J Forde 4 (fs), M Breen 2, D McCormack 2, J Morris 2, B Heffernan 1, C Stakelum 1, C Bowe 1, Brian Hogan 1 (f).	Referee: J Murphy (Limerick); Attendance: 10,982; TV: RTÉ2

17 April 2022 Round 1	Cork	1-17 – 2-25	Limerick	Cork
16:00		(HT: 1-08 - 2-09)		Venue: Páirc Uí Chaoimh
	Gls: S Kingston 1 Pts: P Horgan 9 (8f), R O'Flynn 2, S Barrett 2, C Lehane 2, D Fitzgibbon, T O'Mahony 1	Report	Gls: K Hayes 1, A Gillane 1 Pts: D Byrnes 6 (4f), A Gillane 4 (2f), G Hegarty 3, C Lynch 2, B Nash 2, C O'Neill 2, T Morrissey 1, D Morrissey 1, D Hannon 1, P Ryan 1, D Reidy 1	Referee: J Keenan (Wicklow); Attendance: 40,751; TV: RTÉ2

=== Munster round 2 ===
23 April 2022 Round 2	Limerick	0-30 – 2-21	Waterford	Limerick
19:00		(HT: 0-14 - 0-13)		Venue: TUS Gaelic Grounds
	Pts: A Gillane 13 (7 fs); D Byrnes 6 (5fs); C O’Neill 3, G Hegarty 2, D O’Donovan 2, T Morrissey 2; P Ryan 1, D Reidy 1.	Report	Gls: Stephen Bennett 1, J Prendergast 1. Pts: Stephen Bennett 7 (6 fs, 1 65); A Gleeson 5 (3fs, 1 sl); D Hutchison 5; C Lyons 3, P Curran 1.	Referee: S Stack (Dublin); Attendance: 27,488; TV: Sky Sports

24 April 2022 Round 2	Tipperary	2-16 – 3-21	Clare	Thurles
14:00		(HT: 0-07 - 3-11)		Venue: Semple Stadium
	Gls: G Browne 1, B Heffernan 1. Pts: J Forde 7 (4f, 2 65s, 1 sl); G Browne 3; R Maher 2 (1f); C Barrett 1, N McGrath 1, M Breen 1, M Kehoe 1.	Report	Gls: T Kelly 1 (pen), I Galvin 1, P Duggan 1. Pts: T Kelly 7 (5f); I Galvin 2, P Duggan 2; R Mounsey 2, R Taylor 2, S O’Donnell 2; D Fitzgerald 1, R Hayes 1, D Ryan 1, D McInerney 1.	Referee: J Owens (Wexford); Attendance: 17,260; TV: RTÉ2

=== Munster round 3 ===
1 May 2022 Round 3	Cork	2-20 – 0-28	Clare	Thurles
14:00		(HT: 0-11 - 0-17)		Venue: Semple Stadium
	Gls: A Connolly 1, D Fitzgibbon 1. Pts: P Horgan 10 (6fs 1 65), R O'Flynn 3, S Harnedy 2, S Kingston 2, A Connolly 1, T O'Mahony 1, C Lehane 1.	Report	Pts: T Kelly 10 (4fs 2 65s), D Fitzgerald 3, P Duggan 3, R Taylor 3, S O'Donnell 2, C Malone 2, I Galvin 2, D Ryan 1, D McInerney 1, R Mounsey 1.	Referee: P O'Dwyer (Carlow); Attendance: 20,834

8 May 2022 Round 3	Limerick	3-21 – 0-23	Tipperary	Limerick
14:00		(HT: 1-09 - 0-14)		Venue: TUS Gaelic Grounds
	Gls: A Gillane 2, C Boylan 1. Pts: A Gillane 5 (4f), D Byrnes 3 (2f), T Morrissey 3, D O’Donovan 2, C O’Neill 2, B Nash 1, D Hannon 1, G Hegarty 1, G Mulcahy 1, S Flanagan 1, D Reidy 1.	Report	Pts: N McGrath 13 (9f, 2 ’65, 1 sideline), G Browne 3, J Morris 3, B Heffernan 1, A Flynn 1, M Kehoe 1, R Byrne 1.	Referee: L Gordon (Galway); Attendance: 27,111

=== Munster round 4 ===
15 May 2022 Round 4	Waterford	1-19 – 2-22	Cork	Waterford
14:00				Venue: Walsh Park
	Gls: M Kiely; Pts: Stephen Bennett 7 (6f), A Gleeson 4 (1f), P Curran 3 (1f), N Montgomery 2, J Prendergast 1, P Hogan 1, Shane Bennett 1,	Report	Gls: A Connolly 2 Pts: C Lehane 5 (2f), S Harnedy 5, P Horgan 4 (4f), M Coleman 2, D Fitzgibbon 2, P Collins 1, L Meade 1, A Connolly 1, S Kingdton 1	Referee: James Owens (Wexford); Attendance: 10,986; TV: RTÉ2

15 May 2022 Round 4	Clare	0-24 – 1-21	Limerick	Ennis
16:00		(HT: 0-15 - 1-12)		Venue: Cusack Park
	Pts: T Kelly 16 (10f) (1 65), D Fitzgerald 2, R Taylor 2, D Ryan 2, D McInerney, S Meehan	Report	Gls: K Hayes; Pts: D Byrnes 9 (7f) (1 65), G Hegarty 4, D Reidy 4 (4f), S Flanagan 1, T Morrissey 1, O O'Reilly 1, D O'Donovan 1	Referee: Colm Lyons (Cork); Attendance: 18,129; TV: RTÉ2

=== Munster round 5 ===
22 May 2022 Round 5	Tipperary	1-24 – 3-30	Cork	Thurles
16:00				Venue: Semple Stadium
	Gls: J Morris 1 Pts: N McGrath 13 (12f), J Forde 5, J Morris 2, C Stakelum 1, D Quirke 1, R Maher 1 (1f), P Maher 1(1f)		Gls: T O'Mahony 1, A Connolly, D Fitzgibbon 1 Pts: C Lehane 8 (1f), P Horgan 5 (3f) 1 65), S Kingston 4, R O'Flynn 3, M Coleman 3 (1f), S Harnedy 3, J O'Connor 2, A Connolly 1, T O'Mahony 1	Referee: S Stack (Dublin); Attendance: 27,131; TV: RTÉ2

22 May 2022 Round 5	Clare	3-31 – 2-22	Waterford	Ennis
16:00				Venue: Cusack Park
	Gls: D Fitzgerald 2, D Reidy; Pts: P Duggan 9 (5f), (2 65), S O'Donnell 5, C Malone 4, D Fitzgerald 3, D Reidy 2, D McInerney 2, R Mounsey 2, S Golden 1, I Galvin 1, R Taylor 1, S Meehan 1		Gls: D Hutchison 1, P Curran 1 Pts: D Hutchinson 6, P Curran 5 (4f), S Bennett 5 (3f), C Lyons 2 (1f), P Hogan 1, A Gleeson 1, P Mahony 1, K Bennett 1	Referee: P O’Dwyer (Carlow); Attendance: 16,144; TV: RTÉ One

== Munster Final ==
5 June 2022 Final	Clare	0-29 – 1-29 (a.e.t.)	Limerick	Thurles
16:00		(HT: 0-14 - 1-11) (FT: 0-24 - 1-21)		Venue: Semple Stadium
	Pts: T Kelly 13 (5f) (1 sideline), D Fitzgerald 5, P Duggan 4 (3f) (1 sideline), R Taylor 3, M Rogers 2 (1f), I Galvin 1, S Meehan 1		Gls: G Hegarty 1 Pts: A Gillane 10 (7f), S Flanagan 8, T Morrisey 3, C O'Neil 2, D Byrnes 1, D O'Donovan 1, D Hannon 1, C Boylan 1, D Reidy 1, W. Donoghue 1	Referee: J Keenan (Wicklow); Attendance: 43,112; TV: RTÉ

Limerick advance to the All-Ireland Semi-finals and Clare advance to the All-Ireland Quarter-finals.

== See also ==
- 2022 All-Ireland Senior Hurling Championship
- 2022 Leinster Senior Hurling Championship
