= Séamus Power (Tipperary hurler) =

Irish hurler

Personal information
- Native name: Séamus de Paor (Irish)
- Born: 1952 (age 73–74) Boherlahan, County Tipperary

Sport
- Sport: Hurling
- Position: Full-forward
Club
- Years: Club
- 1960s–1980s: Boherlahan–Dualla
Club titles
- Tipperary titles: 0
Inter-county*
Years	County	Apps (scores)
1971–1986	Tipperary	10 (3–24)
Inter-county titles
- Munster titles: 0
- All-Irelands: 0
- NHL: 1
- All Stars: 0
- *Inter County team apps and scores correct as of 15:18, 6 July 2011.

Séamus Power (born 1952 in Boherlahan, County Tipperary, Ireland) is an Irish former hurler who played for his local club Boherlahan–Dualla and at senior level for the Tipperary county team from 1971 until 1986.
