= 2023 All-Ireland Senior Hurling Championship final =

- Event: 2023 All-Ireland Senior Hurling Championship
Limerick	Kilkenny
0–30	2–15
- Date: 23 July 2023
- Venue: Croke Park, Dublin
- Man of the Match: Peter Casey
- Referee: John Keenan (Wicklow)
- Attendance: 82,300
- Weather: Cloudy with a moderate to fresh northerly breeze 17 °C (63 °F)

The 2023 All-Ireland Senior Hurling Championship final was a hurling match played at Croke Park in Dublin on 23 July 2023 between Kilkenny and Limerick, the culmination of the 2023 All-Ireland Senior Hurling Championship. It was the 136th final of that sport's primary competition, the All-Ireland Senior Hurling Championship.

Reigning title holder Limerick won the game by 0–30 to 2–15 to claim their four-in-a-row and their fifth title in six years.

The match was televised live on RTÉ2 as part of The Sunday Game, presented by Joanne Cantwell from the Croke Park studio with analysis by Anthony Daly, Dónal Óg Cusack and Liam Sheedy. Commentary on the game was provided by Marty Morrissey alongside Michael Duignan. BBC Northern Ireland covered the final for the first time as part of the Championship, previously BBC just covered football and not Hurling. Their coverage was presented by Thomas Niblock with commentary is by Oisin Langan, with pitch-side updates from Sarah Mulkerrins.

The match drew a peak audience of more than 1 million on RTÉ. The TV audience for The Sunday Game coverage peaked at 1,125,000 by the end of the final, the highest since 2019.

== Background ==
- Limerick were aiming to complete a four-in-a-row, having won the All-Ireland Senior Hurling Championships of 2020, 2021 and 2022. This had only been done twice before in the championship's history, by Cork in 1941–44 and Kilkenny in 2006–09.
- Kilkenny were aiming to win their first All-Ireland since 2015.
- This was to be the tenth Kilkenny–Limerick final; Limerick had won five of these (1897, 1936, 1940, 1973, 2022) and Kilkenny four (1933, 1935, 1974, 2007).

== Paths to the final ==
=== Kilkenny ===
22 April 2023 Leinster round-robin	Kilkenny	0-29 - 0-07	Westmeath	Kilkenny
	TJ Reid 0-9 (3fs, 2 65), Adrian Mullen 0-6, John Donnelly 0-4, Eoin Cody, Martin Keoghan 0-2 each, David Blanchfield, Padraig Walsh, Darragh Corcoran, Timmy Clifford, Billy Ryan, Niall Brennan 0-1 each.		Ciaran Doyle 0-4 (3fs), Joseph Boyle, Darragh Clinton, Derek McNicholas 0-1 each.	Stadium: UPMC Nowlan Park; Referee: Chris Mooney (Dublin).

30 April 2023 Leinster round-robin	Kilkenny	0-28 - 1-25	Galway	Kilkenny
	TJ Reid 0-9 (8fs), Eoin Cody 0-6, Darragh Corcoran, Adrian Mullen, John Donnelly, Billy Ryan, and Martin Keoghan 0-2 each, Mikey Butler, Timmy Clifford, and David Blanchfield 0-1 each.	Report	Brian Concannon 1-5, Evan Niland 0-7 (6fs), Conor Whelan 0-2, Padraic Mannion, Daithi Burke, Joseph Cooney, Cianan Fahy, Ronan Glennon, Cathal Mannion, Kevin Cooney, Conor Cooney, Jason Flynn, Liam Collins, and Declan McLoughlin 0-1 each.	Stadium: UPMC Nowlan Park; Attendance: 11,550; Referee: J Murphy (Limerick).

7 May 2023 Leinster round-robin	Antrim	3-20 - 5-31	Kilkenny	Belfast
	Conal Cunning 0-8 (6 frees, 1 65), Keelan Molloy 1-2, Niall McKenna 0-4, Neil McManus 1-1, Conor Johnston 1-0, Paul Boyle 0-2, James McNaughton 0-2, Gerard Walsh 0-1.	Report	TJ Reid 2-10 (0-6 frees, 0-2 65s), Martin Keoghan 3-3, Billy Ryan 0-4, Adrian Mullen 0-2, Alan Murphy 0-3, Eoin Cody 0-2, Walter Walsh 0-2, Richie Reid 0-1, David Blanchfield 0-1, Tom Phelan 0-1, Cillian Buckley 0-1, Eoin Murphy 0-1 (free).	Stadium: Corrigan Park; Referee: Shane Hayes (Galway).

20 May 2023 Leinster round-robin	Kilkenny	0-27 - 0-21	Dublin	Kilkenny
	TJ Reid 0-10 (10fs), Paddy Deegan, Tom Phelan 0-3 each, Adrian Mullen, Martin Keoghan, Eoin Cody 0-2 each, Mikey Butler, David Blanchfield, Richie Reid, Billy Ryan, and Billy Drennan (f) 0-1 each.		Donal Burke 0-10 (8fs), Danny Sutcliffe, Mark Grogan, Dara Purcell 0-2 each, Eoghan O’Donnell, Conor Donohoe, Daire Gray, Cian Boland, Sean Currie 0-1 each.	Stadium: UPMC Nowlan Park

28 May 2023 Leinster round-robin	Wexford	4-23 - 5-18	Kilkenny	Wexford
	Lee Chin 1-10 (0-6 frees, 0-1 ‘65), Liam Óg McGovern 2-1, Kevin Foley 1-1, Rory O’Connor 0-4, Oisín Foley, Cathal Dunbar (one line-ball) 0-2 each, Conor McDonald, Diarmuid O’Keeffe, Liam Ryan 0-1 each.	Report	Eoin Cody 3-1, Tom Phelan 1-4, TJ Reid 0-7 (4 frees, 1 ‘65), Martin Keoghan 1-0, Adrian Mullen, Walter Walsh, Billy Ryan, Pádraig Walsh, Alan Murphy, Conor Delaney 0-1 each.	Stadium: Chadwicks Wexford Park; Attendance: 9,725; Referee: Colm Lyons (Cork).

Kilkenny finished second in the Leinster round-robin and so advanced to the Leinster Final.

11 June 2023 Leinster Final	Kilkenny	4-21 - 2-26	Galway	Dublin
	TJ Reid 0-9 (6f), Walter Walsh 1-2, Mikey Butler 1-0, Martin Keoghan 1-0, Cillian Buckley 1-0, Eoin Cody 0-3, Cian Kenny 0-2, John Donnelly 0-2 David Blanchfield 0-1, Padraig Walsh 0-1, Billy Drennan 0-1	Report	Evan Niland 0-12 (8f), Conor Whelan 1-6, Jason Flynn 1-0, Brian Concannon 0-3, Kevin Cooney 0-3, Cathal Mannion 0-1, Joseph Cooney 0-1	Stadium: Croke Park; Attendance: 24,483; Referee: Seán Stack (Dublin); Man of the match: Conor Whelan (Galway)

As Leinster champions, Kilkenny advanced to the All-Ireland semi-final.

9 July 2023	Kilkenny	1-25 (28) – (25) 1-22	Clare	Dublin
16:00 IST (UTC+01:00)		(HT: 0-10 – 0-15)		Venue: Croke Park
		Report		Referee: Colm Lyons (Cork); Attendance: 59,739; TV: RTÉ 2

=== Limerick ===
23 April 2023 Munster round-robin	Waterford	0-19 - 1-18	Limerick	Thurles
	Stephen Bennett 0-13 (10fs), Austin Gleeson, Dessie Hutchinson 0-2 each, Jamie Barron, Conor Gleeson 0-1 each.	Report	Aaron Gillane 0-7 (5fs), Seamus Flanagan 1-1, Diarmuid Byrnes 0-3 (0-2 frees), Peter Casey and Tom Morrissey 0-2 each, Barry Nash, Gearoid Hegarty, 0-1.	Stadium: Semple Stadium; Attendance: 20,267

29 April 2023 Munster round-robin	Limerick	2-20 - 1-24	Clare	Limerick
	Aaron Gillane 0-7 (0-6 frees); Seamus Flanagan 2-1; Diarmaid Byrnes 0-5 (0-5 frees); Tom Morrissey 0-4 (0-1 free); Cathal O’Neill 0-2; Cian Lynch 0-1.	Report	Aidan McCarthy 0-7 (0-4 frees, 0-1 ’65); Tony Kelly 0-4; Peter Duggan 1-1, Mark Rodgers 0-3 (0-1 sideline); David McInerney, David Fitzgerald, Shane O’Donnell, Aron Shanagher 0-2 each; Ryan Taylor 0-1.	Stadium: TUS Gaelic Grounds; Attendance: 30,460; Referee: Colm Lyons (Cork).

21 May 2023 Munster round-robin	Tipperary	0-25 - 0-25	Limerick	Thurles
	Gearoid O’Connor 0-10 (9fs), Jake Morris 0-4, Mark Kehoe 0-3, Conor Bowe 0-3, Noel McGrath 0-2, Seamus Callanan, Rhys Shelly, John McGrath 0-1 each.	Report	Aaron Gillane 0-6 (3fs) Cathal O’Neill 0-5, Diarmuid Byrnes 0-4 (3fs), Tom Morrissey 0-4, Seamus Flanagan, Graeme Mulcahy 0-2 each, Peter Casey, Declan Hannon 0-1 each.	Stadium: Semple Stadium; Attendance: 37,459; Referee: Sean Stack (Dublin).

28 May 2023 Munster round-robin	Limerick	3-25 - 1-30	Cork	Limerick
	Diarmaid Byrnes 1-4 (1-0 pen, 0-1 ’65), Seamus Flanagan 1-3, Aaron Gillane 0-5 (0-2 frees), Cathal O’Neill 1-0, Gearoid Hegarty, Darragh O’Donovan 0-3 each, Tom Morrissey 0-2; Peter Casey, William O’Donoghue, Barry Nash, Declan Hannon, Barry Nash 0-1 each.	Report	Patrick Horgan 1-14 (0-11 frees), Darragh Fitzgibbon, Seamus Harnedy 0-4 each, Declan Dalton 0-3 (0-2 frees), Shane Kingston 0-2; Tim O’Mahony; Luke Meade, Rob Downey 0-1 each.	Stadium: TUS Gaelic Grounds; Attendance: 40,847; Referee: James Owens (Wexford).

Limerick finished second in the Munster round-robin and so advanced to the Munster Final.

11 June 2023 Munster Final	Clare	1-22 - 1-23	Limerick	Limerick
	T Kelly (0-6, 2 frees); M Rodgers (1-2); A McCarthy (0-4, 3 frees); S O’Donnell, D Fitzgerald, I Galvin (0-2 each); R Taylor, D Ryan, C Malone, A Shanagher (0-1 each).	Report	A Gillane (1-11, 0-8 frees); T Morrissey, D Reidy (0-3 each); C O’Neill (0-2); D O’Donovan, G Hegarty, K Hayes, A English (0-1 each).	Stadium: TUS Gaelic Grounds; Attendance: 43,756; Referee: Liam Gordon (Galway); Man of the Match: Aaron Gillane (Limerick)

As Munster champions, Limerick advanced to the All-Ireland semi-final.

8 July 2023 All-Ireland semi-final	Limerick	2-24 (30) – (21) 1-18	Galway	Dublin
18:00 IST (UTC+01:00)				Venue: Croke Park
		Report		Referee: James Owens (Wexford); TV: RTÉ 2

== Pre-match ==
=== Officials ===
On 13 July, the GAA named Wicklow's John Keenan as the referee for the final, his first All-Ireland final. He previously refereed the 2016 All-Ireland minor final, the 2018 All-Ireland Under-21 final, the 2019 Leinster hurling final and the 2022 Munster hurling final. His umpires were Tommy Redmond (Tinahely), Eddie Leonard (St Patrick's), Paul Reville (Turin) and David Clune (Delvin). His linemen were Galway's Liam Gordon and Wexford's James Owens, with Gordon also the standby referee. The sideline official was Shane Hynes from Galway.

=== Build-up ===
Both teams confirmed that they would return home to their respective counties straight after the match and not remain in Dublin overnight. Limerick would return to Fitzgerald's Woodlands House Hotel and Spa in Adare while Kilkenny would go to the River Court Hotel in Kilkenny.

The final was shown on a big screen on Pery Square in Limerick where an all ticket crowd watched the match.

=== Jubilee teams ===
The Offaly team that won the 1998 All-Ireland Final was presented to the crowd before the match.

== Match ==
=== Summary ===
Paddy Deegan opened the scoring for Kilkenny in the opening minute of the game, a lead which was held for a further five minutes before Limerick could equalise through Cian Lynch, this would be the only time the sides were level until deep into the second half. Limerick would for a brief moment, take the lead of the game when Diarmaid Byrnes knocked over Limerick's second point of the afternoon. However, Limerick's bright start was negated when, in the 10th minute, Eoin Cody picked up a loose ball in the Limerick box, and tucked it low into the bottom-right of the Limerick net, giving Kilkenny a two point advantage. By the 14th minute, two of Limerick's half-back line, William O'Donoghue and Diarmaid Byrnes received yellow cards for foul play. Kilkenny would go on to dominate much of the first half proceedings, leading by as much as six points by the 27th minute. At the end of the first half, Kilkenny led by three points on a 1-09 to 0-09 scoreline.

Limerick started the second half intensely, rejuvenating their hopes of a fourth successive championship, bringing the scores to within a point by the 40th minute. Yet the afternoon was about to take another turn when a piece of individual brilliance saw Deegan scored a goal for Kilkenny, breaking the right side-netting of the Limerick goal. This saw Kilkenny extend their lead to five points in the 42nd minute. Limerick would bravely respond to this turn of events, aggressively seeking possession and scoring five successive points to bring the scores level for only the second time in the contest with 13 minutes remaining in normal time. From this point onwards, Limerick took control of proceedings, taking the lead for the first time since the sixth minute, when Darragh O'Donovan made it 0-18 to 2-11 in the 58th minute. In total, Limerick outscored Kilkenny 0-21 to 1-06 in the second half, completing a stellar comeback and running out comfortable winners. The game finished Kilkenny 2-15 (21 points), Limerick 0-30 (30 points). This fourth consecutive championship meant Limerick became only the third county, since the competition began in 1887, to win four All-Ireland hurling titles in a row.

While David Blanchfield was named on the Kilkenny squad to start at right wing back, he was unable to due to injury. Walter Walsh started in the position instead wearing the number 24 jersey. While starting in the half back line, Walsh operated across the half forward line, with Conor Fogarty dropping back to cover the number 5 position, and John Donnelly occupying the midfield area.

=== Details ===
RTÉ

23 July 2023
15:30 IST (UTC+01:00)
Final

Rep

Limerick	0-30 (30) – (21) 2-15	Kilkenny
(HT: 0-09 (9) – (12) 1-09)
Pts: Diarmaid Byrnes 8 (7f), Peter Casey 5, Aaron Gillane 5 (3f), Cian Lynch 2, Gearóid Hegarty 2, David Reidy 2, Cathal O'Neill 2, Barry Nash 1, Kyle Hayes 1, Darragh O'Donovan 1, Tom Morrissey 1		Gls: Paddy Deegan 1, Eoin Cody 1 Pts: TJ Reid 7 (6f, 1 '65), Paddy Deegan 1, Tom Phelan 3, Eoin Murphy 1 (1f), Richie Reid 1, John Donnelly 1, Adrian Mullen 1

Croke Park, Dublin
Referee: John Keenan (Wicklow)
Attendance: 82,300

Limerick	Kilkenny

GK	1	Nickie Quaid
B	2	Mike Casey	(substituted off) 73'
B	3	Dan Morrissey
B	4	Barry Nash
HB	5	Diarmaid Byrnes
HB	6	William O'Donoghue
HB	7	Kyle Hayes
MF	8	Darragh O'Donovan	(substituted off) 71'
MF	9	Cian Lynch (c)
FW	10	Gearóid Hegarty	(substituted off) 68'
FW	11	David Reidy
FW	12	Tom Morrissey	(substituted off) 55'
FW	13	Aaron Gillane
FW	14	Séamus Flanagan	(substituted off) 62'
FW	15	Peter Casey	(substituted off) 73'
Substitutes:
	16	Cathal O'Neill	(substituted on) 55'
	17	Graeme Mulcahy	(substituted on) 62'
	18	Conor Boylan	(substituted on) 68'
	19	Barry Murphy	(substituted on) 71'
	20	Aaron Costello	(substituted on) 73'
Manager:
John Kiely

GK	1	Eoin Murphy
B	2	Mikey Butler
B	3	Huw Lawlor
B	4	Tommy Walsh
HB	24	Walter Walsh	(substituted off) 48'
HB	6	Richie Reid
HB	7	Paddy Deegan
MF	8	Conor Fogarty	(substituted off) 35'
MF	9	Adrian Mullen
FW	10	Tom Phelan	(substituted off) 65'
FW	11	Martin Keoghan
FW	12	John Donnelly	(substituted off) 68'
FW	13	Billy Ryan	(substituted off) 54'
FW	14	T.J. Reid
FW	15	Eoin Cody (c)
Substitutes:
	16	Pádraig Walsh	(substituted on) 35'
	17	Alan Murphy	(substituted on) 48'
	18	Cian Kenny	(substituted on) 54'
	19	Richie Hogan	(substituted on) 65'
	20	Cillian Buckley	(substituted on) 68'
Manager:
Derek Lyng

=== Trophy presentation ===
Stand-in captain Cian Lynch accepted the Liam MacCarthy Cup from GAA president Larry McCarthy in the Hogan Stand alongside the injured Declan Hannon.

=== Reaction ===
Diarmaid Byrnes speaking to RTÉ after the match said "it needed a big half-time talk" to inspire Limerick's second period demolition of Kilkenny.

Limerick manager John Kiely credited his team for both their resolve and their ability to stick to the process in the white heat of battle.

Kilkenny manager Derek Lyng speaking to RTÉ after the match admitted Limerick were relentless in the way they ground down his side as the 70 minutes elapsed.

Highlights of the final were shown on The Sunday Game programme which aired at 9:30pm that night on RTÉ2 and was presented by Jacqui Hurley.

=== Celebrations ===
The Limerick team returned home straight after the final where a private event was held at the Fitzgerald Woodlands House Hotel in Adare. An estimated 20,000 people turned out to welcome home the team at a public homecoming event at Pery Square in the city centre from 5pm the next day, where a list of live acts and music entertained the crowds in advance of the team's appearance.
