= 2023 All-Ireland Senior Hurling Championship =

Championship details
- Dates: 22 April – 23 July 2023
- Teams: 11

All-Ireland champions
- Winning team: Limerick (12th win)
- Captain: Declan Hannon; Cian Lynch (final)
- Manager: John Kiely

All-Ireland Finalists
- Losing team: Kilkenny
- Captain: Eoin Cody
- Manager: Derek Lyng

Provincial champions
- Munster: Limerick
- Leinster: Kilkenny
- Ulster: Not Played
- Connacht: Not Played

Championship statistics
- Top Scorer: T. J. Reid (2–73)
- All-Star Team: See here

The 2023 All-Ireland Senior Hurling Championship (SHC) was the 136th staging of the All-Ireland Senior Hurling Championship, the Gaelic Athletic Association's premier inter-county hurling tournament, since its establishment in 1887. The competition began in April 2023 and ended on 23 July 2023.

Limerick entered the competition as defending champion, having won its previous three editions.

The final was played on 23 July 2023 at Croke Park in Dublin, between Limerick and Kilkenny. Defending champion Limerick won the game by 0–30 to 2–15 to claim a four-in-a-row, as well as a fifth title in six years.

== Format ==
=== Leinster Championship ===
==== Participating counties (6) ====
Antrim, Dublin, Galway, Kilkenny, Westmeath, Wexford

==== Group stage (15 matches) ====
Each team plays each other once. The 1st and 2nd placed teams advance to the Leinster final and the 3rd placed team advances to the all-Ireland preliminary quarter-finals. All other teams are eliminated from the championship and the bottom placed team may face relegation to next years Joe McDonagh Cup.

==== Final (1 match) ====
The top 2 teams in the group stage contest this game. The Leinster champions advance to the All-Ireland semi-finals and the Leinster runners-up advance to the All-Ireland quarter-finals.

=== Munster Championship ===
==== Participating counties (5) ====
Clare, Cork, Limerick, Tipperary, Waterford

==== Group stage (10 matches) ====
Each team plays each other once. The 1st and 2nd placed teams advance to the Munster final and the 3rd placed team advances to the all-Ireland preliminary quarter-finals. All other teams are eliminated from the championship and the bottom placed team may face relegation to next years Joe McDonagh Cup.

==== Final (1 match) ====
The top 2 teams in the group stage contest this game. The Munster champions advance to the All-Ireland semi-finals and the Munster runners-up advance to the All-Ireland quarter-finals.

=== Joe McDonagh Cup ===
==== Participating counties (6) ====
Carlow, Down, Kerry, Kildare, Laois, Offaly

==== Group stage (15 matches) ====
Each team plays each other once. The 1st and 2nd placed teams advance to the Joe McDonagh Cup final. All other teams are eliminated from the championship and the bottom placed team are relegated to next years Christy Ring Cup.

==== Final (1 match) ====
The top 2 teams in the group stage contest this game. The Joe McDonagh Cup champions and runners-up advance to the All-Ireland preliminary quarter-finals.

=== All-Ireland Championship ===
==== Preliminary quarter-finals (2 matches) ====
The 3rd placed teams from the Leinster and Munster championships play the Joe McDonagh Cup champions and runners-up. Two teams are eliminated at this stage while the winners advance to the quarter-finals.

==== Quarter-finals (2 matches) ====
The winners of the preliminary quarter-finals join the Leinster and Munster runners-up to make up the quarter-final pairings. Teams who may have already met in the provincial championships are kept apart in separate quarter-finals. Two teams are eliminated at this stage while the winners advance to the semi-finals.

==== Semi-finals (2 matches) ====
The winners of the quarter-finals join the Leinster and Munster champions to make up the semi-final pairings. Teams who may have already met in the provincial championships are kept apart in separate semi-finals where possible. Two teams are eliminated at this stage while the winners advance to the final.

==== Final (1 match) ====
The two winners of the semi-finals contest this game.

== Team changes ==
=== To Championship ===
Promoted from the Christy Ring Cup

- Kildare

=== From Championship ===
Relegated to the Christy Ring Cup

- Meath

== Teams ==
=== General information ===
Seventeen counties will compete in the All-Ireland Senior Hurling Championship: six teams in the Leinster Senior Hurling Championship, five teams in the Munster Senior Hurling Championship and six teams in the Joe McDonagh Cup.

County	Last provincial title	Last championship title	Position in 2022 Championship	Current championship
Antrim	2017	—	Preliminary quarter-finals	Leinster Senior Hurling Championship
Carlow	—	—	3rd (Joe McDonagh Cup)	Joe McDonagh Cup
Clare	1998	2013	Semi-finals	Munster Senior Hurling Championship
Cork	2018	2005	Quarter-finals	Munster Senior Hurling Championship
Down	—	—	5th (Joe McDonagh Cup)	Joe McDonagh Cup
Dublin	2013	1938	4th (Leinster Senior Hurling Championship)	Leinster Senior Hurling Championship
Galway	2018	2017	Semi-finals	Leinster Senior Hurling Championship
Kerry	1891	1891	Preliminary quarter-finals	Joe McDonagh Cup
Kildare	—	—	1st (Christy Ring Cup)	Joe McDonagh Cup
Kilkenny	2022	2015	Runners-up	Leinster Senior Hurling Championship
Laois	1949	1915	6th (Leinster Senior Hurling Championship)	Joe McDonagh Cup
Limerick	2022	2022	Champions	Munster Senior Hurling Championship
Offaly	1995	1998	4th (Joe McDonagh Cup)	Joe McDonagh Cup
Tipperary	2016	2019	5th (Munster Senior Hurling Championship)	Munster Senior Hurling Championship
Waterford	2010	1959	4th (Munster Senior Hurling Championship)	Munster Senior Hurling Championship
Westmeath	—	—	5th (Leinster Senior Hurling Championship)	Leinster Senior Hurling Championship
Wexford	2019	1996	Quarter-finals	Leinster Senior Hurling Championship

=== Personnel and kits ===
County	Manager	Captain(s)	Sponsor
Antrim	Darren Gleeson	Conor McCann	Fibrus
Carlow	Tom Mullally	Paul Doyle	SETU
Clare	Brian Lohan	Tony Kelly	Pat O'Donnell
Cork	Pat Ryan	Sean O'Donoghue	Sports Direct
Down	Ronan Sheehan	TBD	EOS IT Solutions
Dublin	Micheál Donoghue	Eoghan O'Donnell and Cian O'Callaghan	AIG
Galway	Henry Shefflin	Daithí Burke and Joseph Cooney	Supermac's
Kerry	Stephen Molumphy	Gavin Dooley	Kerry Group
Kildare	David Herity	James Burke	Brady Family Ham
Kilkenny	Derek Lyng	Richie Reid and Eoin Cody	Avonmore
Laois	Willie Maher	Enda Rowland	Laois Hire
Limerick	John Kiely	Declan Hannon	JP McManus
Offaly	Johnny Kelly	Jason Sampson	Glenisk
Tipperary	Liam Cahill	Noel McGrath	Fiserv
Waterford	Davy Fitzgerald	Jamie Barron and Stephen Bennett	Cognizant
Westmeath	Joe Fortune	Aonghus Clarke and Killian Doyle	Renault
Wexford	Darragh Egan	Lee Chin and Kevin Foley	Zurich Insurance Group

=== Teams by province ===
The participating teams, listed by province, with numbers in parentheses indicating final positions in the 2023 National Hurling League before the championship were:

Connacht (1)

- Galway (5)

Leinster (8)

- Carlow (16)
- Dublin (8)
- Kildare (14)
- Kilkenny (2)
- Laois (13)
- Offaly (12)
- Westmeath (11)
- Wexford (10)

Munster (6)

- Clare (7)
- Cork (4)
- Kerry (15)
- Limerick (1) (title-holders)
- Tipperary (3)
- Waterford (6)

Ulster (2)

- Antrim (9)
- Down (17)

== Summary ==
=== Championships ===
Competition	Year	Champions	Title	Runners-up	Level on pyramid
All-Ireland Senior Hurling Championship	2023	Limerick	12th	Kilkenny	1
Leinster Senior Hurling Championship	2023	Kilkenny	75th	Galway	1
Munster Senior Hurling Championship	2023	Limerick	24th	Clare	1
Joe McDonagh Cup	2023	Carlow	2nd	Offaly	2
Christy Ring Cup	2023	Meath	3rd	Derry	3
Nicky Rackard Cup	2023	Wicklow	1st	Donegal	4
Lory Meagher Cup	2023	Monaghan	1st	Lancashire	5

== Leinster Senior Hurling Championship ==
=== Group Stage ===
Pos	Team	Pld	W	D	L	SF	SA	Diff	Pts	Qualification
1	Galway	5	3	2	0	175	116	+59	8	Advance to Leinster Final
2	Kilkenny	5	3	1	1	163	120	+43	7	Advance to Leinster Final
3	Dublin	5	2	2	1	125	117	+8	6	Advance to All-Ireland preliminary quarter-finals
4	Wexford	5	2	0	3	137	141	−4	4	
5	Antrim	5	1	1	3	141	167	−26	3	
6	Westmeath (R)	5	1	0	4	93	173	−80	2	Relegation to Joe McDonagh Cup

==== Round 1 ====
22 April 2023 Round 1	Antrim	1–19 – 1–19	Dublin	Belfast
	Conal Cunning 0–9 (6f), Gerard Walsh 0–3 (3f), Conor Johnston 1–0, Seán Elliott 0–2 (1 sideline), Michael Bradley 0–2, Keelan Molloy 0–1, Paddy Burke 0–1, Paul Boyle 0–1.	Report	Dónal Burke 1–9 (0-6f, 0–2 65), Cian O'Sullivan 0–6 (1 sideline), Cian Boland 0–1, Paul Crummey 0–1, Daire Gray 0–1, Alex Considine 0–1.	Stadium: Corrigan Park; Referee: John Keenan (Wicklow).

22 April 2023 Round 1	Galway	0–24 – 2–12	Wexford	Galway
	Evan Niland 0–13 (5fs, 165), Brian Concannon, Conor Whelan, and Conor Cooney 0–2 each, TJ Brennan, Cathal Mannion, Liam Collins, Ronan Glennon, and Kevin Cooney 0–1 each.		Rory O'Connor 0–5 (5fs), Liam Óg McGovern 1–2, Conor McDonald 1–0, Cathal Dunbar 0–2, Matthew O'Hanlon, Conor Hearne, and Jack O'Connor 0–1 each.	Stadium: Pearse Stadium; Attendance: 6,460; Referee: Seán Stack (Dublin).

22 April 2023 Round 1	Kilkenny	0–29 – 0–07	Westmeath	Kilkenny
	TJ Reid 0–9 (3fs, 2 65), Adrian Mullen 0–6, John Donnelly 0–4, Eoin Cody, Martin Keoghan 0–2 each, David Blanchfield, Padraig Walsh, Darragh Corcoran, Timmy Clifford, Billy Ryan, Niall Brennan 0–1 each.		Ciaran Doyle 0–4 (3fs), Joseph Boyle, Darragh Clinton, Derek McNicholas 0–1 each.	Stadium: UPMC Nowlan Park; Referee: Chris Mooney (Dublin).

==== Round 2 ====
29 April 2023 Round 2	Wexford	1–30 – 1–26	Antrim	Wexford
	Lee Chin 0–8 (4 frees, 1 ‘65), Rory O’Connor 0–7, Cathal Dunbar 1–2, Jack O’Connor 0–5, Oisín Foley 0–4, Liam Óg McGovern 0–2, Simon Donohoe, Richie Lawlor 0–1 each.	Report	Conal Cunning 0–13 (10 frees, 2 ‘65s), James McNaughton 1–1, Neil McManus (1 free), Rian McMullan 0–2 each, Seaan Elliott, Gerard Walsh (free), Michael Bradley, Keelan Molloy, Conor Johnston, Niall O’Connor, Paul Boyle, Séamie McAuley 0–1 each.	Stadium: Chadwicks Wexford Park; Attendance: 4,200; Referee: Michael Kennedy (Tipperary).

29 April 2023 Round 2	Dublin	2–23 – 1–14	Westmeath	Dublin
	Donal Burke 1–9 (0-9f), Cian Boland 1–2, Paul Crummey 0–2, Conor Burke 0–2, Danny Sutcliffe 0–2, Alex Considine 0–2, Mark Grogan 0–1, Chris O'Leary 0–1, Conor Donohoe 0–1, Daire Gray 0–1.	Report	Ciaran Doyle 0–9 (0-5f), Niall Mitchell 1–0, Eoin Keyes 0–2, Kevin Regan 0–1, Davy Glennon 0–1, Johnny Bermingham 0–1.	Stadium: Parnell Park; Referee: Shane Hynes (Galway).

30 April 2023 Round 2	Kilkenny	0–28 – 1–25	Galway	Kilkenny
	TJ Reid 0–9 (8fs), Eoin Cody 0–6, Darragh Corcoran, Adrian Mullen, John Donnelly, Billy Ryan, and Martin Keoghan 0–2 each, Mikey Butler, Timmy Clifford, and David Blanchfield 0–1 each.	Report	Brian Concannon 1–5, Evan Niland 0–7 (6fs), Conor Whelan 0–2, Padraic Mannion, Daithi Burke, Joseph Cooney, Cianan Fahy, Ronan Glennon, Cathal Mannion, Kevin Cooney, Conor Cooney, Jason Flynn, Liam Collins, and Declan McLoughlin 0–1 each.	Stadium: UPMC Nowlan Park; Attendance: 11,550; Referee: J Murphy (Limerick).

==== Round 3 ====
6 May 2023 Round 3	Dublin	1–22 – 0–23	Wexford	Dublin
	Donal Burke 0–13 (0-10f), Cian O'Sullivan 1–1, Paul Crummey 0–2, Paddy Doyle 0–1, Danny Sutcliffe 0–1, Chris O'Leary 0–1, Mark Grogan 0–1, Conor Burke 0–1, Sean Currie 0–1.	Report	Lee Chin 0–8 (0-6f), Rory O'Connor 0–5 (0-3f), Cathal Dunbar 0–2, Oisin Foley 0–2, Conor McDonald 0–2, Conor Devitt 0–1, Richie Lawlor 0–1, Jack O'Connor 0–1, Simon Donohoe 0–1.	Stadium: Croke Park; Attendance: 9,125; Referee: Thomas Walsh (Waterford).

6 May 2023 Round 3	Westmeath	0–17 – 6–33	Galway	Mullingar
	N O’Brien 0–10 (9f), D Glennon 0–2, J Boyle, R Greville, D McNicholas, C Doyle, G Greville 0–1 each.	Report	C Whelan 3–1, E Niland 0–10 (6f 1 65), B Concannon 1–3, K Cooney, D McLaughlin 1–2 each, L Collins, C Mannion 0–4 each, D Burke 0–2, P Mannion, C Fahy, S Linnane, J Ryan, M McManus 0–1 each.	Stadium: TEG Cusack Park; Referee: K Jordan (Tipperary)

7 May 2023 Round 3	Antrim	3–20 – 5–31	Kilkenny	Belfast
	Conal Cunning 0–8 (6 frees, 1 65), Keelan Molloy 1–2, Niall McKenna 0–4, Neil McManus 1–1, Conor Johnston 1–0, Paul Boyle 0–2, James McNaughton 0–2, Gerard Walsh 0–1.	Report	TJ Reid 2–10 (0–6 frees, 0–2 65s), Martin Keoghan 3–3, Billy Ryan 0–4, Adrian Mullen 0–2, Alan Murphy 0–3, Eoin Cody 0–2, Walter Walsh 0–2, Richie Reid 0–1, David Blanchfield 0–1, Tom Phelan 0–1, Cillian Buckley 0–1, Eoin Murphy 0–1 (free).	Stadium: Corrigan Park; Referee: Shane Hayes (Galway).

==== Round 4 ====
20 May 2023 Round 4	Kilkenny	0–27 – 0–21	Dublin	Kilkenny
	TJ Reid 0–10 (10fs), Paddy Deegan, Tom Phelan 0–3 each, Adrian Mullen, Martin Keoghan, Eoin Cody 0–2 each, Mikey Butler, David Blanchfield, Richie Reid, Billy Ryan, and Billy Drennan (f) 0–1 each.		Donal Burke 0–10 (8fs), Danny Sutcliffe, Mark Grogan, Dara Purcell 0–2 each, Eoghan O’Donnell, Conor Donohoe, Daire Gray, Cian Boland, Sean Currie 0–1 each.	Stadium: UPMC Nowlan Park; Attendance: 5,308

21 May 2023 Round 4	Galway	5–29 – 1–22	Antrim	Galway
	Evan Niland 0–8 (3fs, 165), Conor Cooney 0–7, Conor Whelan 2–0, Kevin Cooney and Tom Monaghan 1–2 each, Declan McLoughlin 0–4, Liam Collins 1–0, Pádraic Mannion and Joseph Cooney 0–2 each, Adrian Tuohey and TJ Brennan 0–1 each.		Conal Cunning 1–3 (1–0 pen, 2fs), James McNaughton 0–5 (1f, 165), Paddy Burke and Conor Johnston 0–3 each, Daniel McKernan 0–2, Joe Maskey, Enda Óg McGarry, Domhnall Nugent, Niall McKenna, Keelan Molloy, and Eoin O'Neill 0–1 each.	Stadium: Pearse Stadium

21 May 2023 Round 4	Wexford	2–22 – 4–18	Westmeath	Wexford
	Conor McDonald 2–2, Lee Chin 0–6 (4fs), Jack O’Connor 0–4 (2 sideline cuts), Rory O’Connor 0–3, Oisín Foley, Conor Hearne 0–2 each, Mikie Dwyer, Ian Carty, Cathal Dunbar 0–1 each.	Report	Ciarán Doyle 0–11 (10fs), Niall O’Brien 2–3 (1f), Niall Mitchell 2–0, Peter Clarke, Joseph Boyle, Derek McNicholas, Eoin Keyes 0–1 each.	Stadium: Chadwicks Wexford Park; Referee: Chris Mooney (Dublin).

==== Round 5 ====
28 May 2023 Round 4	Westmeath	1–19 – 4–24	Antrim	Mullingar
	C Doyle 0–7 (4fs, 2‘65’s), D Glennon 0–4, O McCabe 1–0, N O’Brien 0–3 (1f), J Boyle, J Galvin (1 sideline) 0–2 each, J Bermingham 0–1.	Report	C Cunning 1–9 (0–7 fs), J McNaughton 1–3, C Johnston, E O’Neill 1–1 each, N McKenna 0–3, N McManus, S Elliott, N O’Connor 0–2 each, K Molloy 0–1.	Stadium: TEG Cusack Park; Referee: K Jordan (Tipperary).

28 May 2023 Round 4	Dublin	2–22 – 1–25	Galway	Dublin
	Donal Burke 0–10 (0-6f, 0–1 65), Danny Sutcliffe 1–2, Cian O'Sullivan 1–1, Cian Boland 0–3, Eoghan O'Donnell 0–2, Mark Grogan 0–1, Daire Gray 0–1, Conor Donohoe 0–1, Conor Burke 0–1.	Report	Evan Niland 0–10 (0-6f), Joseph Cooney 0–5, Daithi Burke 1–0, Kevin Cooney 0–3, Tom Monaghan 0–3, Ronan Glennon 0–1, Fintan Burke 0–1, Eanna Murphy 0–1 (0-1f), Jason Flynn 0–1.	Stadium: Croke Park; Attendance: 30,802; Referee: Paud O'Dwyer (Carlow).

28 May 2023 Round 4	Wexford	4–23 – 5–18	Kilkenny	Wexford
	Lee Chin 1–10 (0–6 frees, 0–1 ‘65), Liam Óg McGovern 2–1, Kevin Foley 1–1, Rory O’Connor 0–4, Oisín Foley, Cathal Dunbar (one line-ball) 0–2 each, Conor McDonald, Diarmuid O’Keeffe, Liam Ryan 0–1 each.	Report	Eoin Cody 3–1, Tom Phelan 1–4, TJ Reid 0–7 (4 frees, 1 ‘65), Martin Keoghan 1–0, Adrian Mullen, Walter Walsh, Billy Ryan, Pádraig Walsh, Alan Murphy, Conor Delaney 0–1 each.	Stadium: Chadwicks Wexford Park; Attendance: 9,725; Referee: Colm Lyons (Cork).

=== Final ===
11 June 2023
Final

Kilkenny	4–21 – 2–26	Galway
TJ Reid 0–9 (6f), Walter Walsh 1–2, Mikey Butler 1–0, Martin Keoghan 1–0, Cillian Buckley 1–0, Eoin Cody 0–3, Cian Kenny 0–2, John Donnelly 0–2 David Blanchfield 0–1, Padraig Walsh 0–1, Billy Drennan 0–1	Report	Evan Niland 0–12 (8f), Conor Whelan 1–6, Jason Flynn 1–0, Brian Concannon 0–3, Kevin Cooney 0–3, Cathal Mannion 0–1, Joseph Cooney 0–1

Croke Park
Attendance: 24,483
Referee: Seán Stack (Dublin)
Man of the match: Conor Whelan (Galway)

== Munster Senior Hurling Championship ==
=== Group Stage ===
Pos	Team	Pld	W	D	L	SF	SA	Diff	Pts	Qualification
1	Clare	4	3	0	1	8–91	10–76	+9	6	Advance to Munster Final
2	Limerick	4	2	1	1	6–88	2–98	+2	5	Advance to Munster Final
3	Tipperary	4	1	2	1	7–93	8–91	−1	4	Advance to All-Ireland preliminary quarter-finals
4	Cork	4	1	1	2	8–94	7–90	+7	3	
5	Waterford	4	1	0	3	1–77	3–88	−17	2	

==== Round 1 ====
23 April 2023 Round 1	Waterford	0–19 – 1–18	Limerick	Thurles
	Stephen Bennett 0–13 (10fs), Austin Gleeson, Dessie Hutchinson 0–2 each, Jamie Barron, Conor Gleeson 0–1 each.	Report	Aaron Gillane 0–7 (5fs), Seamus Flanagan 1–1, Diarmuid Byrnes 0–3 (0–2 frees), Peter Casey and Tom Morrissey 0–2 each, Barry Nash, Gearoid Hegarty, 0–1.	Stadium: Semple Stadium; Attendance: 20,267

23 April 2023 Round 1	Clare	3–23 – 5–22	Tipperary	Ennis
	Aidan McCarthy 1–13 (7fs, 2’65), Mark Rodgers 2–0), Ryan Taylor, Ian Galvin, Shane Meehan 0–2 each, Diarmuid Ryan, Tony Kelly, John Conlon, Robin Mounsey 0–1 each.	Report	Jason Forde 2–6 (1–0 Pen, 5fs, 1–1 sideline), Jake Morris 2–4, Sean Ryan 1–1, Noel McGrath 0–3, Gearoid O’Connor 0–2, Brian McGrath, Alan Tynan, John McGrath, Mark Kehoe, Seamus Kennedy, Conor Bowe 0–1 each.	Stadium: Cusack Park; Attendance: 17,971

==== Round 2 ====
29 April 2023 Round 2	Limerick	2–20 – 1–24	Clare	Limerick
	Aaron Gillane 0–7 (0–6 frees); Seamus Flanagan 2–1; Diarmaid Byrnes 0–5 (0–5 frees); Tom Morrissey 0–4 (0–1 free); Cathal O’Neill 0–2; Cian Lynch 0–1.	Report	Aidan McCarthy 0–7 (0–4 frees, 0–1 ’65); Tony Kelly 0–4; Peter Duggan 1–1, Mark Rodgers 0–3 (0–1 sideline); David McInerney, David Fitzgerald, Shane O’Donnell, Aron Shanagher 0–2 each; Ryan Taylor 0–1.	Stadium: TUS Gaelic Grounds; Attendance: 30,460; Referee: Colm Lyons (Cork).

30 April 2023 Round 2	Cork	0–27 – 0–18	Waterford	Cork
	Patrick Horgan 0–8 (6f), Darragh Fitzgibbon 0–4, Declan Dalton (2f), Séamus Harnedy 0–3 each, Robert Downey, Conor Lehane, Robbie O'Flynn 0–2 each, Brian Roche, Shane Barrett, Luke Meade 0–1 each.	Report	Stephen Bennett 0–9 (7fs, 1 65), Calum Lyons, Pádraig Fitzgerald 0–2 each, Jamie Barron, Neil Montgomery, Dessie Hutchinson, Austin Gleeson, Patrick Fitzgerald 0–1 each.	Stadium: Páirc Uí Chaoimh; Attendance: 29,104; Referee: James Owens (Wexford)

==== Round 3 ====
6 May 2023 Round 3	Cork	4–19 – 2–25	Tipperary	Cork
	Patrick Horgan 0–8 (5f, 2 65); Declan Dalton 1–2 (0-2f); Darragh Fitzgibbon 1–1; Robbie O'Flynn, Brian Hayes 1–0 each; Séamus Harnedy, Shane Kingston 0–3 each; Conor Lehane, Tim O’Mahony 0–1 each.	Report	Mark Kehoe 1–4; Gearóid O’Connor 1–3 (0-3f); Alan Tynan, Jason Forde (3f) 0–4 each; Séamus Kennedy, Jake Morris 0–3 each; Conor Stakelum, Noel McGrath, Seán Ryan, Séamus Callanan 0–1 each.	Stadium: Páirc Uí Chaoimh; Attendance: 36,765; Referee: Paud O'Dwyer (Carlow).

13 May 2023 Round 3	Waterford	0–16 – 2–22	Clare	Thurles
	S Bennett 0–7 (7fs); A Gleeson 0–3 (2fs); D Hutchinson, P Curran 0–2 each; J Barron, P Hogan 0–1 each.	Report	T Kelly 0–13 (8fs, 1 65); I Galvin, C Malone 1–1 each; D Ryan, S O’Donnell 0–2 each; R Taylor, S Meehan, R Mounsey 0–1 each.	Stadium: Semple Stadium; Attendance: 14,320; Referee: J Keenan (Wicklow).

==== Round 4 ====
21 May 2023 Round 4	Clare	2–22 – 3–18	Cork	Ennis
	Tony Kelly 2–4 (1–0 pen), Aidan McCarthy (2f), David Fitzgerald, Diarmuid Ryan ,0–3 each, Ryan Taylor, Shane O’Donnell, David McInerney 0–2 each, Peter Duggan, Mark Rodgers, Seadna Morey 0–1 each.	Report	Patrick Horgan 1–9 (6fs), Declan Dalton 1–1 (1f), Conor Cahalane 1–0, Seamus Harnedy, Darragh Fitzgibbon, Brian Roche 0–2 each, Damien Cahalane, Shane Kingston 0–1 each.	Stadium: Cusack Park; Attendance: 18,659

21 May 2023 Round 4	Tipperary	0–25 – 0–25	Limerick	Thurles
	Gearoid O’Connor 0–10 (9fs), Jake Morris 0–4, Mark Kehoe 0–3, Conor Bowe 0–3, Noel McGrath 0–2, Seamus Callanan, Rhys Shelly, John McGrath 0–1 each.	Report	Aaron Gillane 0–6 (3fs) Cathal O’Neill 0–5, Diarmuid Byrnes 0–4 (3fs), Tom Morrissey 0–4, Seamus Flanagan, Graeme Mulcahy 0–2 each, Peter Casey, Declan Hannon 0–1 each.	Stadium: Semple Stadium; Attendance: 37,459; Referee: Sean Stack (Dublin).

==== Round 5 ====
28 May 2023 Round 5	Tipperary	0–21 – 1–24	Waterford	Thurles
	Noel McGrath 0–7 (all frees); Seamus Callanan 0–3, Gearoid O’Connor 0–4 (0–3 frees); Ronan Maher 0–2, Brian McGrath 0–1, Alan Tynan 0–1, Mark Kehoe 0–1, Conor Bowe 0–1, Seamus Kennedy 0–1.		Stephen Bennett 0–8 (0–7 frees); Dessie Hutchinson 1–4, Jack Fagan 0–4, Neil Montgomery 0–2, Patrick Fitzgerald 0–2, Billy Nolan 0–1, Darragh Lyons 0–1, Peter Hogan 0–1, Patrick Curran 0–1.	Stadium: Semple Stadium; Attendance: 20,832; Referee: John Keenan (Wicklow).

28 May 2023 Round 5	Limerick	3–25 – 1–30	Cork	Limerick
	Diarmaid Byrnes 1–4 (1–0 pen, 0–1 ’65), Seamus Flanagan 1–3, Aaron Gillane 0–5 (0–2 frees), Cathal O’Neill 1–0, Gearoid Hegarty, Darragh O’Donovan 0–3 each, Tom Morrissey 0–2; Peter Casey, William O’Donoghue, Barry Nash, Declan Hannon, Barry Nash 0–1 each.	Report	Patrick Horgan 1–14 (0–11 frees), Darragh Fitzgibbon, Seamus Harnedy 0–4 each, Declan Dalton 0–3 (0–2 frees), Shane Kingston 0–2; Tim O’Mahony; Luke Meade, Rob Downey 0–1 each.	Stadium: TUS Gaelic Grounds; Attendance: 40,847; Referee: James Owens (Wexford).

=== Final ===
11 June 2023
Final

Clare	1–22 – 1–23	Limerick
T Kelly (0–6, 2 frees); M Rodgers (1–2); A McCarthy (0–4, 3 frees); S O’Donnell, D Fitzgerald, I Galvin (0–2 each); R Taylor, D Ryan, C Malone, A Shanagher (0–1 each).	Report	A Gillane (1–11, 0–8 frees); T Morrissey, D Reidy (0–3 each); C O’Neill (0–2); D O’Donovan, G Hegarty, K Hayes, A English (0–1 each).

TUS Gaelic Grounds
Attendance: 43,756
Referee: Liam Gordon (Galway)
Man of the Match: Aaron Gillane (Limerick)

== Cup competitions ==
=== Joe McDonagh Cup ===
==== Group Stage ====
Pos	Team	Pld	W	D	L	SF	SA	Diff	Pts	Qualification
1	Carlow (C)	5	3	2	0	13–118	1–104	+50	8	Advance to Final and All-Ireland preliminary quarter-finals
2	Offaly	5	4	0	1	7–105	6–93	+15	8	Advance to Final and All-Ireland preliminary quarter-finals
3	Laois	5	3	1	1	14–114	4–87	+57	7	
4	Kerry	5	2	1	2	2–101	6–96	−7	5	
5	Down	5	1	0	4	3–88	18–112	−59	2	
6	Kildare (R)	5	0	0	5	6–68	10–112	−56	0	Relegated to Christy Ring Cup

==== Final ====
27 May 2023 Final	Offaly	1–31 – 2–29 (a.e.t.)	Carlow	Dublin
	Eoghan Cahill 0–8 (3f), Cillian Kiely 0–6 (2f), David Nally 0–5 (1 65, 1 sideline, 1 free), Charlie Mitchell 1–1, Adrian Cleary 0–3, Eimhin Kelly 0–2, Paddy Clancy 0–2, Jason Sampson 0–1, Killian Sampson 0–1, Sam Bourke 0–1, Joey Keenaghan 0–1.	Report	Martin Kavanagh 1–8 (5f, 1 65), Paddy Boland 1–4, Chris Nolan 0–4, James Doyle 0–3, Jon Nolan 0–3, John Michael Nolan 0–2, Conor Kehoe 0–2, Jack Kavanagh 0–2, Diarmuid Byrne 0–1, Kevin McDonald 0–1 (f).	Stadium: Croke Park; Referee: Thomas Walsh (Waterford).

Carlow will be promoted to the 2024 Leinster Senior Hurling Championship.

=== Christy Ring Cup (Tier 3) ===
==== Group stage ====
Pos	Team	Pld	W	D	L	SF	SA	Diff	Pts	Qualification
1	Meath	5	4	0	1	4–117	5–98	+16	8	Advance to Knockout Stage
2	Derry	5	3	1	1	8–126	10–84	+36	7	Advance to Knockout Stage
3	Sligo	5	3	0	2	6–97	7–110	−16	6	
4	London	5	3	0	2	13–106	8–112	+9	6	
5	Tyrone	5	1	1	3	9–95	5–113	−6	3	
6	Mayo	5	0	0	5	3–99	8–120	−39	0	Relegated to Nicky Rackard Cup

==== Final ====
3 June 2023 Final	Meath	1–23 – 1–21	Derry	Dublin
	James Regan 0–14 (0-11f), Nicky Potterton 1–1, Éamon Ó Donnchadha 0–3, Martin Healy 0–1, Pa Ryan 0–1, Simon Ennis 0–1, James Kelly 0–1, Seanie Geraghty 0–1.	Report	Cormac O’Doherty 1–14 (1-14f), John Mullan 0–2, Corey O’Reilly 0–2, Seán Kelly 0–1, Pádhraig Nelis 0–1, Ségdae Melaugh 0–1.	Stadium: Croke Park, Dublin; Referee: Kevin Jordan (Tipperary)

=== Nicky Rackard Cup (Tier 4) ===
==== Group stage ====
Pos	Team	Pld	W	D	L	SF	SA	Diff	Pts	Qualification
1	Wicklow	5	5	0	0	15–107	7–62	+69	10	Advance to Knockout Stage
2	Donegal	5	4	0	1	9–103	9–74	+29	8	Advance to Knockout Stage
3	Armagh	5	2	0	3	11–80	8–110	−21	4	
4	Roscommon	5	2	0	3	11–70	11–107	−37	4	
5	Louth	5	1	1	3	8–81	17–83	−29	3	
6	Fermanagh	5	0	1	4	7–82	9–87	−11	1	Relegation to Lory Meagher Cup

==== Final ====
3 June 2023 Final	Wicklow	1–20 – 3–12	Donegal	Croke Park, Dublin
	C Moorehouse 0–9 (5f), A O’Brien 1–1, D Staunton (sl), S Germaine and L Evans 0–2 each,, P Doyle, E McCormack, D Maloney and M Boland 0–1 each	Report	L White 1–2 (1-1f, 1’65) R McDermott 0–3, L McKinney 1–1, R Hilferty 1–0, J O’Loughlin, B McIntyre, R Campbell, D Cullen, G Gilmore (sl) and C McDermott 0–1 each

=== Lory Meagher Cup (Tier 5) ===
==== Group stage ====
Pos	Team	Pld	W	D	L	SF	SA	Diff	Pts	Qualification
1	Monaghan	5	3	1	1	10–98	9–67	+34	7	Advance to Knockout Stage
2	Lancashire	5	3	0	2	20–76	14–97	−3	6	Advance to Knockout Stage
3	Cavan	5	2	1	2	7–106	12–77	+14	5	
4	Longford	5	2	1	2	6–84	6–75	+9	5	
5	Leitrim	5	2	1	2	8–73	9–78	−10	5	
6	Warwickshire	5	1	0	4	10–60	11–101	−44	2	

==== Final ====
3 June 2023 Final	Monaghan	3–22 – 3–20	Lancashire	Dublin
	Niall Arthur 0–10 (0-6f), Niall Garland 2–3, Thomas Hughes 1–2, Ethan Flynn, Stephen Lambe and Conor Gernon 0–2 each, Declan Hughes 0–1.	Report	Robin Spencer 1–6 (0-5f), Conor Madden 0–7 (0-3f, 0–2 65s, 0–1 s/l), Simon Holland 1–1, Darragh Carroll 1–0, Shane Madden 0–2, Eoghan Clifford, Conor Kennedy, Phil Shine and Cormac Kenny 0–1 each.	Stadium: Croke Park; Referee: Tarlach Conway (Derry)

== Bracket ==
Preliminary Quarter-Finals
Dublin	2–25
Carlow	0–21
Tipperary	7–38
Offaly	3–18

Quarter-Finals
Clare	5–26
Dublin	2–17
Galway	1–20
Tipperary	1–18

Semi-Finals
Kilkenny	2–22
Clare	1–22
Limerick	2–24
Galway	1–18

All-Ireland Final
Kilkenny	2–15
Limerick	0–30

=== Preliminary quarter-finals ===
17 June 2023 Preliminary Quarter-final	Offaly	3–18 (27) – 7–38 (59)	Tipperary	Tullamore
16:00 IST (UTC+01:00)		(HT: 1–10 – 3–25)		Venue: Glenisk O'Connor Park
	Gls: Eoghan Cahill 1 (pen), Cillian Kiely 1 (1f), Charlie Mitchell 1 Pts: Eoghan Cahill 7 (5f), Cillian Kiely 3 (1f), Jason Sampson 2, Charlie Mitchell 1, Paddy Clancy 1, Brian Duignan 1, John Murphy 1, Liam Langton 1, Paddy Delaney 1	Report	Gls: Mark Kehoe 3, Jason Forde 2, John McGrath 1, Seamus Callanan 1 Pts: Jason Forde 11 (4f, 3 65'), Jake Morris 7, Conor Stakelum 6, Mark Kehoe 3, Alan Tynan 3, Noel McGrath 2, John McGrath 1, Dan McCormack 1, Seamus Kennedy 1, Eoghan Connolly 1, Bryan O'Mara 1, John Campion 1	Referee: J Murphy (Limerick); Attendance: 9,962; TV: GAAGO

17 June 2023 Preliminary Quarter-final	Carlow	0–21 (21) – 2–25 (31)	Dublin	Carlow
17:00 IST (UTC+01:00)		(HT: 0–13 – 0–12)		Venue: Netwatch Cullen Park
	Pts: Martin Kavanagh 12 (11f), Chris Nolan 3, James Doyle 2, Jack McCullagh 1, Kevin McDonald 1, Richard Coady 1, John Michael Nolan 1	Report	Gls: Cian O'Sullivan 1, Mark Grogan 1 Pts: Donal Burke 8 (8f), Cian O'Sullivan 3 (1f), Chris O'Leary 3, Danny Sutcliffe 3, Mark Grogan 2, Conor Burke 2, Fergal Whitely 2, Darragh Power 1, Paul Crummey 1	Referee: J Owens (Wexford); TV: GAAGO

== Quarter-finals ==
24 June 2023	Clare	5–26 (41) – 2–17 (23)	Dublin	Limerick
16:00 IST (UTC+01:00)				Venue: Gaelic Grounds
	Gls: Tony Kelly 3, Mark Rodgers 1, Shane O'Donnell 1 Pts: Tony Kelly 4, Mark Rodgers 11 (5fs), Shane O’Donnell 2, David Fitzgerald 4, Aron Shanagher, Ian Galvin 2 each, Cathal Malone 1.		Gls: Darragh Power 1, Alex Considine 1 Pts: Cian O’Sullivan 11 (9fs, 1'65), Paul Crummey 3, Fergal Whitley, Danny Sutcliffe, Daire Gray 1 each.	Attendance: 34,180; TV: RTÉ

24 June 2023	Galway	1–20 (23) – 1–18 (21)	Tipperary	Limerick
18:15 IST (UTC+01:00)				Venue: Gaelic Grounds
	Gls: Conor Whelan 1 Pts: Evan Niland 8 (7fs), Conor Whelan 4, Tom Monaghan 3, Cianan Fahy 2, Daithí Burke, Joseph Cooney, Ronan Glennon 1 each.		Gls: John McGrath 1 Pts: Jason Forde 10 (8fs), Alan Tynan, Séamus Kennedy 2 each, Michael Breen, Ronan Maher, Gearóid O’Connor, Johnny Ryan 1 each.	Attendance: 34,180; TV: RTE

== Semi-finals ==
8 July 2023	Limerick	2–24 (30) – (21) 1–18	Galway	Dublin
18:00 IST (UTC+01:00)		(HT: 1–12 – 1–13)		Venue: Croke Park
	Gls: Aaron Gillane 2 Pts: Aaron Gillane 6 (5f), Diarmaid Byrnes 3 (3f), Kyle Hayes, Gearóid Hegarty, Tom Morrissey, Peter Casey, Seamus Flanagan 2 each, Darragh O’Donovan, Graeme Mulcahy, Cathal O’Neill, David Reidy, Cian Lynch 1 each	Report	Gls: Cathal Mannion 1 Pts: Evan Niland 0–9 (9f), Conor Whelan, Brian Concannon 3 each, Cathal Mannion, Kevin Cooney, Tom Monaghan 1 each	Referee: James Owens (Wexford); Attendance: 59,739; TV: RTÉ 2

9 July 2023	Kilkenny	1–25 (28) – (25) 1–22	Clare	Dublin
16:00 IST (UTC+01:00)		(HT: 0–15 – 0–10)		Venue: Croke Park
	Gls: Eoin Cody 1 Pts: TJ Reid 12 (10f, 1 sideline, 1 ’65), Eoin Cody 5, Adrian Mullen 2, Huw Lawlor, Paddy Deegan, Tom Phelan, Billy Ryan, Padraig Walsh, Cian Kenny 1 each.	Report	Gls: Shane O'Donnell 1 Pts: Mark Rodgers 10 (6f, 3 ’65), David Fitzgerald 3, Shane O'Donnell, Diarmuid Ryan, David McInerney, Cathal Malone, Peter Duggan, Tony Kelly, Ryan Taylor, Ian Galvin, David Reidy 1 each.	Referee: Colm Lyons (Cork); Attendance: 48,360; TV: RTÉ 2

== Final ==
RTÉ

23 July 2023
Final

Report

Limerick	0–30 (30) – (21) 2–15	Kilkenny
(HT: 0-09 (9) – (12) 1-09)
Pts: Diarmaid Byrnes 8 (7f), Peter Casey 5, Aaron Gillane 4 (3f), Darragh O'Donovan 2, Cian Lynch 2, Gearóid Hegarty 2, David Reidy 2, Cathal O'Neill 2, Barry Nash 1, Kyle Hayes 1, Tom Morrissey 1		Gls: Paddy Deegan 1, Eoin Cody 1 Pts: TJ Reid 7 (6f, 1 '65), Paddy Deegan 1, Tom Phelan 3, Eoin Murphy 1 (1f), Richie Reid 1, John Donnelly 1, Adrian Mullen 1

Croke Park, Dublin
Referee: John Keenan (Wicklow)
Attendance: 82,300

== Stadia and locations ==
Locations of the 2023 All-Ireland SHC teams.
Red: Munster SHC; Green: Leinster SHC; Blue: Joe McDonagh Cup.

County	Location	Province	Stadium	Capacity
Antrim	Belfast	Ulster	Corrigan Park	3,700
Carlow	Carlow	Leinster	Dr Cullen Park	11,000
Clare	Ennis	Munster	Cusack Park	19,000
Cork	Cork	Munster	Páirc Uí Chaoimh	45,000
Down	Rubane	Ulster	McKenna Park	5,000
Dublin	Dublin	Leinster	Croke Park	82,300
Galway	Galway	Connacht	Pearse Stadium	26,197
Kerry	Tralee	Munster	Austin Stack Park	12,000
Kildare	Newbridge	Leinster	Hawkfield Centre of Excellence	1,300
Kilkenny	Kilkenny	Leinster	Nowlan Park	27,000
Laois	Portlaoise	Leinster	O'Moore Park	22,000
Limerick	Limerick	Munster	Gaelic Grounds	44,023
Offaly	Tullamore	Leinster	O'Connor Park	18,000
Tipperary	Thurles	Munster	Semple Stadium	45,690
Waterford	Thurles	Munster	Semple Stadium (Note: Waterford's usual home ground at Walsh Park is under redevelopment, so their home games were played at a neutral venue.)	45,690
Westmeath	Mullingar	Leinster	Cusack Park	11,500
Wexford	Wexford	Leinster	Chadwicks Wexford Park	18,000

== Statistics ==
=== Top scorers ===
==== Top scorer overall ====
Rank	Player	County	Tally	Total	Matches	Average
1	T. J. Reid	Kilkenny	2–73	79	8	9.87
2	Evan Niland	Galway	0–77	77	8	9.62
3	Donal Burke	Dublin	2–59	65	6	10.83
4	Aaron Gillane	Limerick	3–47	56	7	8.00
5	Tony Kelly	Clare	5–33	48	7	6.85
6	Conal Cunning	Antrim	2–42	48	5	9.60
7	Patrick Horgan	Cork	2–39	45	4	11.25
8	Jason Forde	Tipperary	4–31	43	4	10.75
9	Conor Whelan	Galway	7–18	39	8	4.87
10	Mark Rodgers	Clare	4–27	39	6	6.50
11	Stephen Bennett	Waterford	0–37	37	4	9.25
12	Eoin Cody	Kilkenny	5–21	36	8	4.50
13	Lee Chin	Wexford	1–32	35	5	7.00
14	Aidan McCarthy	Clare	1–27	30	5	6.00
15	Martin Keoghan	Kilkenny	5-09	24	6	4.00
16	Jake Morris	Tipperary	2–18	24	5	4.80

==== In a single game ====
Rank	Player	County	Tally	Total	Opposition
1	Patrick Horgan	Cork	1–14	17	Limerick
2	Jason Forde	Tipperary	2–11	17	Offaly
3	Aidan McCarthy	Clare	1–13	16	Tipperary
4	T. J. Reid	Kilkenny	2–10	16	Antrim
5	Aaron Gillane	Limerick	1–11	14	Clare
6	Tony Kelly	Clare	0–13	13	Waterford
7	Stephen Bennett	Waterford	0–13	13	Limerick
8	Evan Niland	Galway	0–12	12	Kilkenny
9	Martin Keoghan	Kilkenny	3-03	12	Antrim
10	Jason Forde	Tipperary	2-06	12	Clare
11	Patrick Horgan	Cork	1-09	12	Clare

=== Scoring events ===
- Widest winning margin: 34 points
  - Galway 6–33 – 0–17 Westmeath (Leinster SHC)
- Most goals in a match: 10
  - Offaly 3–18 – 7–38 Tipperary (preliminary quarter-final)
- Most points in a match: 56
  - Wexford 1–30 – 1–26 Antrim (Leinster SHC)
  - Offaly 3–18 – 7–38 Tipperary (preliminary quarter-final)
- Most goals by one team in a match: 7
  - Offaly 3–18 – 7–38 Tipperary (preliminary quarter-final)
- Most points by one team in a match: 38
  - Offaly 3–18 – 7–38 Tipperary (preliminary quarter-final)
- Highest aggregate score: 86 points
  - Offaly 3–18 – 7–38 Tipperary (preliminary quarter-final)
- Lowest aggregate score: 36 points
  - Kilkenny 0–29 – 0-07 Westmeath (Leinster SHC)

== Miscellaneous ==
- Limerick win their fourth All-Ireland in a row and their 12th in total
- Limerick extended their unbeaten streak to 17 games, 16 wins and 1 draw, after defeating Waterford in the first round Munster championship. The streak began in the Munster quarter final clash versus Clare in October 2020, and ended with a defeat to Clare in the 2023 Munster SHC. Kilkenny are the only other county with a longer unbeaten streak, 21 games unbeaten from 2006 to 2010.
- Tipperary scored 5 goals in a championship match for the first time since 2017 when they scored 5 against Clare in the Munster Championship. They went on to score 7 against Offaly in the All Ireland preliminary quarter-final.
- The 7–38 scored by Tipperary against Offaly, equivalent to 59 points, is the highest score ever recorded in a SHC game. The aggregate score, 86 points in total, is also an all-time record.
- Conor Whelan (Galway) became the first player to score an All-Ireland SHC hat-trick since 2019 with three goals against Westmeath.
- Kilkenny's T. J. Reid becomes the first player to reach 600 points total while playing against Dublin on the 20th May 2023 in Round 4 of the Leinster Championship. While doing so, he also became the highest scoring player in the history of the All-Ireland competition, he over took this position from Cork's Patrick Horgan who is now just fourteen points behind T. J. Reid's top score.
- This was the first year Kildare competed in the championship since 2004.
- Offaly qualify for the All-Ireland knockout stage for the first time since 2003. (Does not include qualifiers)
- Westmeath defeated Wexford in the championship for the first time since 1940.
- Cork's 18th year in a row without an All-Ireland senior title, their longest dry spell since the founding of the championship.
- This was Kilkenny's eighth season in a row without a title, equalling their losing streak of 1984–91.
- Kilkenny's first time losing two All Ireland senior finals in a row to the same opposition.
- It was the first championship meeting between Offaly and Tipperary since 2010. Tipperary went on to defeat Offaly in the preliminary quarter final of the All Ireland series by 7–38 to 3–18 setting a new record for the highest team score in the history of the championship.
- It was the first championship meeting between Clare and Dublin since 2012.
- Limerick win their fifth Munster SHC in a row, the only time a county other than Cork has achieved this.
- Nickie Quaid, Declan Hannon, Graeme Mulcahy and David Reidy became the first Limerick players to win six Munster Championship medals.

== Live television coverage ==
RTÉ, the national broadcaster in Ireland, provided the majority of the live television coverage of the hurling championship with 17 games shown.

For the first time GAAGO also broadcast 9 matches in Ireland as part of a deal that will run to 2027 and had exclusive rights to some games. After the GAA's broadcasting contract with Sky Sports expired in October 2022 and they did not seek contracts with producers on free-to-air channels such as Virgin Media Sport, GAAGO was the only place to watch certain games of the 2023 Munster Senior Hurling Championship. This was criticised by some including Tánaiste Micheál Martin.

After suspicion the service was operating beyond its clearance given by the Competition and Consumer Protection Commission in 2017, the commission opened an inquiry in May 2023 into the service's adherence to competition law. RTÉ told the Irish Examiner that they believed that "CCPC approval was not needed".

On 12 July 2023, senior GAA officials appeared before the Oireachtas Sport and Media Committee to defend the controversial GAAGO coverage of All-Ireland championships, saying broadcasting every championship match on TV was "not realistic" and not in the GAA's "interest".

== Awards ==
Sunday Game Team of the Year

The Sunday Game team of the year was picked 23 July on the night of the final. The panel consisting of Jackie Tyrrell, Brendan Cummins, Donal Óg Cusack, Joe Canning, Shane Dowling, and Ursula Jacob also chose Kyle Hayes as the Sunday game player of the year.

- 1 Eoin Murphy
- 2 Mikey Butler
- 3 Huw Lawlor
- 4 Dan Morrissey
- 5 Diarmaid Byrnes
- 6 Will O'Donoghue
- 7 Kyle Hayes
- 8 Darragh O'Donovan
- 9 David Fitzgerald
- 10 Tom Morrissey
- 11 TJ Reid
- 12 Shane O'Donnell
- 13 Conor Whelan
- 14 Aaron Gillane
- 15 Eoin Cody

All Star Team of the Year

On 16 November, the All-Star winners were announced. The awards ceremony was held at the RDS on 17 November. Aaron Gillane was named as the GAA/GPA Hurler of the Year with Mark Rodgers named as the GAA/GPA Young Hurler of the Year.

Pos.	Player	Team	Appearances
GK	Eoin Murphy	Kilkenny	4
RCB	Mikey Butler	Kilkenny	2
FB	Huw Lawlor	Kilkenny	2
LCB	Dan Morrissey	Limerick	3
RWB	Diarmaid Byrnes	Limerick	4
CB	John Conlon	Clare	2
LWB	Kyle Hayes	Limerick	4
MD	Darragh O'Donovan	Limerick	2
MD	William O'Donoghue	Limerick	2
RWF	Shane O'Donnell	Clare	2
CF	T. J. Reid	Kilkenny	7
LWF	Tom Morrissey	Limerick	3
RCF	Conor Whelan	Galway	2
FF	Aaron Gillane	Limerick	4
LCF	Eoin Cody	Kilkenny	1

== See also ==
- 2023 Leinster Senior Hurling Championship
- 2023 Munster Senior Hurling Championship
- 2023 Joe McDonagh Cup (Tier 2)
- 2023 Christy Ring Cup (Tier 3)
- 2023 Nicky Rackard Cup (Tier 4)
- 2023 Lory Meagher Cup (Tier 5)
