= 2023 Munster Senior Hurling Championship =

Hurling Championship

Munster Senior Hurling Championship
Tournament details
- Province: Munster
- Year: 2023
- Trophy: The Mick Mackey Cup
- Date: April - June 2023
- Teams: 5
- Defending champions: Limerick

Winners
- Champions: Limerick (24th win)
- Manager: John Kiely
- Captain: Declan Hannon
- Qualify for: Munster SHC Final; All-Ireland SHC

Runners-up
- Runners-up: Clare

Other
- Matches played: 11
- Website: https://munster.gaa.ie/

The 2023 Munster Senior Hurling Championship was the 2023 installment of the annual Munster Senior Hurling Championship organised by Munster GAA.

The competition began on Sunday, 23 April 2023.

Limerick, who entered the competition as four times defending champions, retained their title after defeating Clare in the final, thus becoming only the 2nd county, after Cork, to win five Munster senior hurling championships in a row.

== Teams ==
=== General information ===
Five counties contested the 2023 Munster Senior Hurling Championship:

County	Last Provincial Title	Last Championship Title	Position in 2022 Championship
Clare	1998	2013	Runners-up
Cork	2018	2005	3rd
Limerick	2022	2022	Champions
Tipperary	2016	2019	5th
Waterford	2010	1959	4th

=== Personnel and kits ===
County	Manager	Captain(s)	Sponsor
Clare	Brian Lohan	Tony Kelly	Pat O'Donnell
Cork	Pat Ryan	Sean O'Donoghue	Sports Direct
Limerick	John Kiely	Declan Hannon	JP McManus
Tipperary	Liam Cahill	Noel McGrath	Fiserv
Waterford	Davy Fitzgerald	Jamie Barron and Stephen Bennett	Cognizant

== Group stage ==
=== Table ===
Pos	Team	Pld	W	D	L	SF	SA	Diff	Pts	Qualification
1	Clare	4	3	0	1	8-91	10-76	+9	6	Advance to Munster Final
2	Limerick	4	2	1	1	6-88	2-98	+2	5	Advance to Munster Final
3	Tipperary	4	1	2	1	7-93	8-91	-1	4	Advance to All-Ireland preliminary quarter-finals
4	Cork	4	1	1	2	8-94	7-90	+7	3	
5	Waterford	4	1	0	3	1-77	3-88	-17	2	

=== Round 1 ===
23 April 2023 Round 1	Waterford	0-19 - 1-18	Limerick	Semple Stadium
	Stephen Bennett 0-13 (10fs), Austin Gleeson, Dessie Hutchinson 0-2 each, Jamie Barron, Conor Gleeson 0-1 each.	Report	Aaron Gillane 0-7 (5fs), Seamus Flanagan 1-1, Diarmuid Byrnes 0-3 (0-2 frees), Peter Casey and Tom Morrissey 0-2 each, Barry Nash, Gearoid Hegarty, 0-1.	Attendance: 20,267

23 April 2023 Round 1	Clare	3-23 - 5-22	Tipperary	Cusack Park
	Aidan McCarthy 1-13 (7fs, 2’65), Mark Rodgers 2-0), Ryan Taylor, Ian Galvin, Shane Meehan 0-2 each, Diarmuid Ryan, Tony Kelly, John Conlon, Robin Mounsey 0-1 each.	Report	Jason Forde 2-6 (1-0 Pen, 5fs, 1-1 sideline), Jake Morris 2-4, Sean Ryan 1-1, Noel McGrath 0-3, Gearoid O’Connor 0-2, Brian McGrath, Alan Tynan, John McGrath, Mark Kehoe, Seamus Kennedy, Conor Bowe 0-1 each.	Attendance: 17,971

=== Round 2 ===
29 April 2023 Round 2	Limerick	2-20 - 1-24	Clare	TUS Gaelic Grounds
	Aaron Gillane 0-7 (6fs), Seamus Flanagan 2-1, Diarmuid Byrnes 0-5 (5fs), Tom Morrissey 0-4 (1f), Cathal O'Neill 0-2, Cian Lynch 0-1	Report	Aidan McCarthy 0-7 (4fs, 1 65'), Tony Kelly 0-4, Peter Duggan 1-1, Mark Rodgers 0-3 (1 sideline), David McInerney, David Fitzgerald, Shane O'Donnell, Aron Shanagher 0-2 each, Ryan Taylor 0-1	Attendance: 30,460; Referee: Colm Lyons (Cork)

30 April 2023 Round 2	Cork	0-27 - 0-18	Waterford	Pairc Ui Chaoimh
	Patrick Horgan 0-8 (6fs), Darragh Fitzgibbon 0-4, Declan Dalton (2f), Seamus Harnedy 0-3 each, Robert Downey, Conor Lehane, Robbie O'Flynn 0-2 each, Brian Roche, Shane Barrett, Luke Meade 0-1 each	Report	Stephen Bennett 0-9 (7fs, 1 65'), Callum Lyons, Padraig Fitzgerald 0-2 each, Jamie Barron, Neil Montgomery, Dessie Hutchinson, Austin Gleeson, Patrick Fitzgerald 0-1 each	Attendance: 29,104; Referee: James Owens (Wexford)

=== Round 3 ===
6 May 2023 Round 3	Cork	4-19 - 2-25	Tipperary	Cork
	Patrick Horgan 0-8 (5f, 2 65); Declan Dalton 1-2 (0-2f); Darragh Fitzgibbon 1-1; Robbie O'Flynn, Brian Hayes 1-0 each; Séamus Harnedy, Shane Kingston 0-3 each; Conor Lehane, Tim O’Mahony 0-1 each.	Report	Mark Kehoe 1-4; Gearóid O’Connor 1-3 (0-3f); Alan Tynan, Jason Forde (3f) 0-4 each; Séamus Kennedy, Jake Morris 0-3 each; Conor Stakelum, Noel McGrath, Seán Ryan, Séamus Callanan 0-1 each.	Stadium: Pairc Ui Chaoimh; Attendance: 36,765; Referee: Paud O'Dwyer (Carlow).

13 May 2023 Round 3	Waterford	0-16 - 2-22	Clare	Thurles
	S Bennett 0-7 (7fs); A Gleeson 0-3 (2fs); D Hutchinson, P Curran 0-2 each; J Barron, P Hogan 0-1 each.	Report	T Kelly 0-13 (8fs, 1 65); I Galvin, C Malone 1-1 each; D Ryan, S O’Donnell 0-2 each; R Taylor, S Meehan, R Mounsey 0-1 each.	Stadium: Semple Stadium; Attendance: 14,320; Referee: J Keenan (Wicklow).

=== Round 4 ===
21 May 2023 Round 4	Tipperary	0-25 - 0-25	Limerick	Semple Stadium
	Gearoid O’Connor 0-10 (9fs), Jake Morris 0-4, Mark Kehoe 0-3, Conor Bowe 0-3, Noel McGrath 0-2, Seamus Callanan, Rhys Shelly, John McGrath 0-1 each	Report	Aaron Gillane 0-6 (3fs) Cathal O’Neill 0-5, Diarmuid Byrnes 0-4 (3fs), Tom Morrissey 0-4, Seamus Flanagan, Graeme Mulcahy 0-2 each, Peter Casey, Declan Hannon 0-1 each	Attendance: 37,459; Referee: Sean Stack (Dublin)

21 May 2023 Round 4	Clare	2-22 - 3-18	Cork	Cusack Park
	Tony Kelly 2-4 (1-0 pen), Aidan McCarthy (2f), David Fitzgerald, Diarmuid Ryan ,0-3 each, Ryan Taylor, Shane O’Donnell, David McInerney 0-2 each, Peter Duggan, Mark Rodgers, Seadna Morey 0-1 each	Report	Patrick Horgan 1-9 (6fs), Declan Dalton 1-1 (1f), Conor Cahalane 1-0, Seamus Harnedy, Darragh Fitzgibbon, Brian Roche 0-2 each, Damien Cahalane, Shane Kingston 0-1 each	Attendance: 18,659; Referee: Johnny Murphy (Limerick)

=== Round 5 ===
28 May 2023 Round 5	Tipperary	0-21 - 1-24	Waterford	Semple Stadium
	Noel McGrath 0-7 (7f), Gearoid O'Connor 0-4 (3f), Seamus Callanan 0-3, Ronan Maher 0-2, Brian McGrath, Alan Tynan, Mark Kehoe, Conor Bowe, Seamus Kennedy 0-1 each	Report	Stephen Bennett 0-8 (7f), Dessie Hutchinson 1-4, Jack Fagan 0-4, Neil Montgomery, Patrick Fitzgerald 0-2 each, Billy Nolan, Darragh Lyons, Peter Hogan, Patrick Curran 0-1 each	Referee: John Keenan (Wicklow)

28 May 2023 Round 5	Limerick	3-25 - 1-30	Cork	TUS Gaelic Grounds
	Diarmaid Byrnes 1-4 (1-0 pen, 0-1 65'), Seamus Flanagan 1-3, Aaron Gillane 0-5 (2f), Cathal O'Neill 1-0, Gearoid Hegarty, Darragh O’Donovan 0-3 each, Tom Morrissey 0-2, Peter Casey, William O’Donoghue, Kyle Hayes, Declan Hannon, Barry Nash 0-1 each	Report	Patrick Horgan 1-14 (11f), Darragh Fitzgibbon, Seamus Harnedy 0-4 each, Declan Dalton 0-3 (2f), Shane Kingston 0-2, Tim O’Mahony, Luke Meade, Rob Downey 0-1 each.	Attendance: 40,847; Referee: James Owens (Wexford)

== Final ==
11 June 2023 Final	Clare	1-22 - 1-23	Limerick	TUS Gaelic Grounds
	Tony Kelly 0-6 (0-2 frees); Mark Rodgers 1-2; Aidan McCarthy 0-4 (0-3 frees); Shane O’Donnell, David Fitzgerald, Ian Galvin 0-2 each; Cathal Malone, Diarmuid Ryan, Ryan Taylor, Aron Shanagher 0-1 each	Report	Aaron Gillane 1-11 (0-8 frees); Tom Morrissey, David Reidy 0-3 each; Cathal O’Neill 0-2; Darragh O’Donovan, Gearoid Hegarty, Kyle Hayes, Adam English 0-1 each	Attendance: 43,756; Referee: Liam Gordon (Galway); Man of the Match: Aaron Gillane (Limerick)

== Stadia and locations ==
Locations of the 2023 Munster SHC teams

County	Location	Province	Stadium	Capacity
Clare	Ennis	Munster	Cusack Park	19,000
Cork	Cork	Munster	Páirc Uí Chaoimh	45,000
Limerick	Limerick	Munster	Gaelic Grounds	44,023
Tipperary	Thurles	Munster	Semple Stadium	45,690
Waterford	Waterford	Munster	Fraher Field	15,000

== Championship statistics ==
=== Top scorers ===
==== Top scorer overall ====
Rank	Player	County	Tally	Total	Matches	Average
1	Patrick Horgan	Cork	2-39	45	4	11.25
2	Aaron Gillane	Limerick	1-36	39	5	7.80
3	Stephen Bennett	Waterford	0-37	37	4	9.25
4	Tony Kelly	Clare	2-28	34	5	6.80
5	Aidan McCarthy	Clare	1-27	30	4	7.50
6	Gearóid O'Connor	Tipperary	1-19	22	4	5.50
7	Séamus Flanagan	Limerick	4-07	19	5	3.80
7	Diarmaid Byrnes	Limerick	1-16	19	5	3.80
9	Jake Morris	Tipperary	2-11	17	3	5.67
10	Jason Forde	Tipperary	2-10	16	2	8.00

==== In a single game ====
Rank	Player	County	Tally	Total	Opposition
1	Patrick Horgan	Cork	1-14	17	Limerick
2	Aaron Gillane	Limerick	1-11	14	Clare
3	Aidan McCarthy	Clare	1-13	16	Tipperary
4	Stephen Bennett	Waterford	0-13	13	Limerick
4	Tony Kelly	Clare	0-13	13	Waterford
6	Jason Forde	Tipperary	2-06	12	Clare
6	Patrick Horgan	Cork	1-09	12	Clare
8	Jake Morris	Tipperary	2-04	10	Clare
8	Tony Kelly	Clare	2-04	10	Cork
8	Gearóid O'Connor	Tipperary	0-10	10	Limerick

== Miscellaneous ==
- Limerick won their fifth munster championship in a row
- Tipperary ended five match losing streak in the Munster Senior Hurling Championship by beating Clare in the opening round.
- Limerick lost their first Munster Senior Hurling Championship match since 2019 with Clare defeating them in round 2

== See also ==
- 2023 All-Ireland Senior Hurling Championship
- 2023 Leinster Senior Hurling Championship
- 2023 Joe McDonagh Cup (Tier 2)
- 2023 Christy Ring Cup (Tier 3)
- 2023 Nicky Rackard Cup (Tier 4)
- 2023 Lory Meagher Cup (Tier 5)
