= 2023 Leinster Senior Hurling Championship final =

Hurling match

2023 Leinster Senior Hurling final
- Event: 2023 Leinster Senior Hurling Championship
Kilkenny	Galway
4–21	2–26
- Date: 11 June 2023
- Venue: Croke Park, Dublin
- Man of the Match: Conor Whelan
- Referee: Seán Stack (Dublin)
- Attendance: 24,483
- Weather: Sunny

The 2023 Leinster Senior Hurling Championship final was the deciding game of the 2023 Leinster Senior Hurling Championship, a hurling match that was played on 11 June at Croke Park, Dublin. It was contested by defending champions Kilkenny and 2022 Leinster finalists Galway. The game was televised live on RTÉ2 as part of the Sunday Game presented by Joanne Cantwell with analysis from Anthony Daly, Joe Canning and Shane Dowling. Commentary on the game was provided by Ger Canning alongside Michael Duignan.

Kilkenny managed by Derek Lyng in his first year and captained by Eoin Cody won their 75th Leinster title running out winners 4–21 to 2–26, with a dramatic injury time goal from Cillian Buckley, with Kilkenny having blown an 8 point lead with 20 minutes to play.

== Details ==
RTÉ2

11 June 2023
16:00
Final

Report

Kilkenny	4–21 – 2–26	Galway
(HT: 2–09 – 1–12)
Gls: W Walsh 1, M Butler 1, M Keoghan 1, C Buckley 1 Pts: TJ Reid 9 (6f), W Walsh 2, E Cody 3, C Kenny 2, J Donnelly 2, D Blanchfield 1, P Walsh 1, B Drennan 1		Gls: C Whelan 1, J Flynn 1 Pts: E Niland 12 (8f), C Whelan 6, B Concannon 3, K Cooney 3, C Mannion 1, J Cooney 1

Croke Park, Dublin
Referee: Seán Stack (Dublin)
Attendance: 24,483
