= 2023 Leinster Senior Hurling Championship =

2022 hurling championship

Leinster Senior Hurling Championship
Tournament details
- Province: Leinster
- Year: 2023
- Trophy: Bob O'Keeffe Cup
- Date: 22 April – 11 June 2022
- Teams: 6
- Defending champions: Kilkenny

Winners
- Champions: Kilkenny (75th win)
- Manager: Derek Lyng
- Captain: Eoin Cody
- Qualify for: All-Ireland SHC

Runners-up
- Runners-up: Galway

Other
- Matches played: 16
- Website: Leinster GAA

The 2023 Leinster Senior Hurling Championship was the 2023 installment of the annual Leinster Senior Hurling Championship organised by Leinster GAA. Kilkenny were the defending champions having defeated Galway in the 2022 final.

== Format ==
=== Group stage (15 matches) ===
Each team plays each other once. The 1st and 2nd placed teams advance to the Leinster final and the 3rd placed team advances to the all-Ireland preliminary quarter-finals. All other teams are eliminated from the championship and the bottom placed team may face relegation to next years Joe McDonagh Cup.

=== Final (1 match) ===
The top 2 teams in the group stage contest this game. The Leinster champions advance to the All-Ireland semi-finals and the Leinster runners-up advance to the All-Ireland quarter-finals.

== Team changes ==
=== To Championship ===
Promoted from the Joe McDonagh Cup

- Antrim

=== From Championship ===
Relegated to the Joe McDonagh Cup

- Laois

== Teams ==
=== General Information ===
Six counties will compete in the Leinster Senior Hurling Championship:

County	Last Championship Title	Last All-Ireland Title	Position in 2022 Championship
Antrim	—	—	Champions (Joe McDonagh Cup)
Dublin	2013	1938	4th
Galway	2018	2017	Runners-up
Kilkenny	2022	2015	Champions
Westmeath	—	—	5th
Wexford	2019	1996	3rd

=== Personnel and kits ===
County	Manager	Captain(s)	Sponsor
Antrim	Darren Gleeson	Conor McCann	Fibrus
Dublin	Micheál Donoghue	Eoghan O'Donnell and Cian O'Callaghan	AIG
Galway	Henry Shefflin	Daithí Burke and Joseph Cooney	Supermac's
Kilkenny	Derek Lyng	Richie Reid and Eoin Cody	Avonmore
Westmeath	Joe Fortune	Aonghus Clarke and Killian Doyle	Renault
Wexford	Darragh Egan	Lee Chin	Zurich Insurance Group

== Group stage ==
=== Table ===
Pos	Team	Pld	W	D	L	SF	SA	Diff	Pts	Qualification
1	Galway	5	3	2	0	175	116	+59	8	Advance to Leinster Final
2	Kilkenny	5	3	1	1	163	120	+43	7	Advance to Leinster Final
3	Dublin	5	2	2	1	125	117	+8	6	Advance to All-Ireland preliminary quarter-finals
4	Wexford	5	2	0	3	137	141	-4	4	
5	Antrim	5	1	1	3	141	167	-26	3	
6	Westmeath (R)	5	1	0	4	93	173	-80	2	Relegation to Joe McDonagh Cup

=== Matches ===
==== Round 1 ====
22 April 2023 Round 1	Antrim	1-19 - 1-19	Dublin	Belfast
	Conal Cunning 0-9 (6f), Gerard Walsh 0-3 (3f), Conor Johnston 1-0, Seán Elliott 0-2 (1 sideline), Michael Bradley 0-2, Keelan Molloy 0-1, Paddy Burke 0-1, Paul Boyle 0-1.	Report	Dónal Burke 1-9 (0-6f, 0-2 65), Cian O'Sullivan 0-6 (1 sideline), Cian Boland 0-1, Paul Crummey 0-1, Daire Gray 0-1, Alex Considine 0-1.	Stadium: Corrigan Park; Referee: John Keenan (Wicklow).

22 April 2023 Round 1	Galway	0-24 - 2-12	Wexford	Pearse Stadium
	Evan Niland 0-13 (5fs, 165), Brian Concannon, Conor Whelan, and Conor Cooney 0-2 each, TJ Brennan, Cathal Mannion, Liam Collins, Ronan Glennon, and Kevin Cooney 0-1 each.		Rory O'Connor 0-5 (5fs), Liam Óg McGovern 1-2, Conor McDonald 1-0, Cathal Dunbar 0-2, Matthew O'Hanlon, Conor Hearne, and Jack O'Connor 0-1 each.	Attendance: 6,460

22 April 2023 Round 1	Kilkenny	0-29 - 0-07	Westmeath	UPMC Nowlan Park
	TJ Reid 0-9 (3fs, 2 65), Adrian Mullen 0-6, John Donnelly 0-4, Eoin Cody, Martin Keoghan 0-2 each, David Blanchfield, Padraig Walsh, Darragh Corcoran, Timmy Clifford, Billy Ryan, Niall Brennan 0-1 each.		Ciaran Doyle 0-4 (3fs), Joseph Boyle, Darragh Clinton, Derek McNicholas 0-1 each.

==== Round 2 ====
29 April 2023 Round 2	Wexford	1-30 - 1-26	Antrim	Wexford
	Lee Chin 0-8 (4 frees, 1 ‘65), Rory O’Connor 0-7, Cathal Dunbar 1-2, Jack O’Connor 0-5, Oisín Foley 0-4, Liam Óg McGovern 0-2, Simon Donohoe, Richie Lawlor 0-1 each.	Report	Conal Cunning 0-13 (10 frees, 2 ‘65s), James McNaughton 1-1, Neil McManus (1 free), Rian McMullan 0-2 each, Seaan Elliott, Gerard Walsh (free), Michael Bradley, Keelan Molloy, Conor Johnston, Niall O’Connor, Paul Boyle, Séamie McAuley 0-1 each.	Stadium: Chadwicks Wexford Park; Attendance: 4,200; Referee: Michael Kennedy (Tipperary).

29 April 2023 Round 2	Dublin	2-23 - 1-14	Westmeath	Dublin
	Donal Burke 1-9 (0-9f), Cian Boland 1-2, Paul Crummey 0-2, Conor Burke 0-2, Danny Sutcliffe 0-2, Alex Considine 0-2, Mark Grogan 0-1, Chris O'Leary 0-1, Conor Donohoe 0-1, Daire Gray 0-1.	Report	Ciaran Doyle 0-9 (0-5f), Niall Mitchell 1-0, Eoin Keyes 0-2, Kevin Regan 0-1, Davy Glennon 0-1, Johnny Bermingham 0-1.	Stadium: Parnell Park; Referee: Shane Hynes (Galway).

30 April 2023 Round 2	Kilkenny	0-28 - 1-25	Galway	Kilkenny
	TJ Reid 0-9 (8fs), Eoin Cody 0-6, Darragh Corcoran, Adrian Mullen, John Donnelly, Billy Ryan, and Martin Keoghan 0-2 each, Mikey Butler, Timmy Clifford, and David Blanchfield 0-1 each.	Report	Brian Concannon 1-5, Evan Niland 0-7 (6fs), Conor Whelan 0-2, Padraic Mannion, Daithi Burke, Joseph Cooney, Cianan Fahy, Ronan Glennon, Cathal Mannion, Kevin Cooney, Conor Cooney, Jason Flynn, Liam Collins, and Declan McLoughlin 0-1 each.	Stadium: UPMC Nowlan Park; Attendance: 11,550; Referee: J Murphy (Limerick).

==== Round 3 ====
6 May 2023 Round 3	Dublin	1-22 - 0-23	Wexford	Dublin
	Donal Burke 0-13 (0-10f), Cian O'Sullivan 1-1, Paul Crummey 0-2, Paddy Doyle 0-1, Danny Sutcliffe 0-1, Chris O'Leary 0-1, Mark Grogan 0-1, Conor Burke 0-1, Sean Currie 0-1.	Report	Lee Chin 0-8 (0-6f), Rory O'Connor 0-5 (0-3f), Cathal Dunbar 0-2, Oisin Foley 0-2, Conor McDonald 0-2, Conor Devitt 0-1, Richie Lawlor 0-1, Jack O'Connor 0-1, Simon Donohoe 0-1.	Stadium: Croke Park; Attendance: 9,125; Referee: Thomas Walsh (Waterford).

6 May 2023 Round 3	Westmeath	0-17 - 6-33	Galway	Mullingar
	N O’Brien 0-10 (9f), D Glennon 0-2, J Boyle, R Greville, D McNicholas, C Doyle, G Greville 0-1 each.	Report	C Whelan 3-1, E Niland 0-10 (6f 1 65), B Concannon 1-3, K Cooney, D McLaughlin 1-2 each, L Collins, C Mannion 0-4 each, D Burke 0-2, P Mannion, C Fahy, S Linnane, J Ryan, M McManus 0-1 each.	Stadium: TEG Cusack Park; Referee: K Jordan (Tipperary)

7 May 2023 Round 3	Antrim	3-20 - 5-31	Kilkenny	Belfast
	Conal Cunning 0-8 (6 frees, 1 65), Keelan Molloy 1-2, Niall McKenna 0-4, Neil McManus 1-1, Conor Johnston 1-0, Paul Boyle 0-2, James McNaughton 0-2, Gerard Walsh 0-1.	Report	TJ Reid 2-10 (0-6 frees, 0-2 65s), Martin Keoghan 3-3, Billy Ryan 0-4, Adrian Mullen 0-2, Alan Murphy 0-3, Eoin Cody 0-2, Walter Walsh 0-2, Richie Reid 0-1, David Blanchfield 0-1, Tom Phelan 0-1, Cillian Buckley 0-1, Eoin Murphy 0-1 (free).	Stadium: Corrigan Park; Referee: Shane Hayes (Galway).

==== Round 4 ====
20 May 2023 Round 4	Kilkenny	0-27 - 0-21	Dublin	UPMC Nowlan Park
	TJ Reid 0-10 (10fs), Paddy Deegan, Tom Phelan 0-3 each, Adrian Mullen, Martin Keoghan, Eoin Cody 0-2 each, Mikey Butler, David Blanchfield, Richie Reid, Billy Ryan, and Billy Drennan (f) 0-1 each	Report	Donal Burke 0-10 (8fs), Danny Sutcliffe, Mark Grogan, Dara Purcell 0-2 each, Eoghan O’Donnell, Conor Donohoe, Daire Gray, Cian Boland, Sean Currie 0-1 each	Attendance: 5,308; Referee: Liam Gordon (Galway)

21 May 2023 Round 4	Galway	5-29 - 1-22	Antrim	Pearse Stadium
	Evan Niland 0-8 (3fs, 165), Conor Cooney 0-7, Conor Whelan 2-0, Kevin Cooney and Tom Monaghan 1-2 each, Declan McLoughlin 0-4, Liam Collins 1-0, Pádraic Mannion and Joseph Cooney 0-2 each, Adrian Tuohey and TJ Brennan 0-1 each	Report	Conal Cunning 1-3 (1-0 pen, 2fs), James McNaughton 0-5 (1f, 165), Paddy Burke and Conor Johnston 0-3 each, Daniel McKernan 0-2, Joe Maskey, Enda Óg McGarry, Domhnall Nugent, Niall McKenna, Keelan Molloy, and Eoin O'Neill 0-1 each

21 May 2023 Round 4	Wexford	2-22 - 4-18	Westmeath	Chadwicks Wexford Park
	Conor McDonald 2-2, Lee Chin 0-6 (4fs), Jack O’Connor 0-4 (2 sideline cuts), Rory O’Connor 0-3, Oisín Foley, Conor Hearne 0-2 each, Mikie Dwyer, Ian Carty, Cathal Dunbar 0-1 each	Report	Ciarán Doyle 0-11 (10fs), Niall O’Brien 2-3 (1f), Niall Mitchell 2-0, Peter Clarke, Joseph Boyle, Derek McNicholas, Eoin Keyes 0-1 each

==== Round 5 ====
28 May 2023 Round 5	Westmeath	1-19 - 4-24	Antrim	TEG Cusack Park
	C Doyle 0-7 (4fs, 2‘65’s), D Glennon 0-4, O McCabe 1-0, N O’Brien 0-3 (1f), J Boyle, J Galvin (1 sideline) 0-2 each, J Bermingham 0-1	Report	C Cunning 1-9 (0-7 fs), J McNaughton 1-3, C Johnston, E O’Neill 1-1 each, N McKenna 0-3, N McManus, S Elliott, N O’Connor 0-2 each, K Molloy 0-1

28 May 2023 Round 5	Dublin	2-22 - 1-25	Galway	Croke Park
	Donal Burke 0-10 (0-6f, 0-1 65), Danny Sutcliffe 1-2, Cian O'Sullivan 1-1, Cian Boland 0-3, Eoghan O'Donnell 0-2, Mark Grogan 0-1, Daire Gray 0-1, Conor Donohoe 0-1, Conor Burke 0-1	Report	Evan Niland 0-10 (0-6f), Joseph Cooney 0-5, Daithi Burke 1-0, Kevin Cooney 0-3, Tom Monaghan 0-3, Ronan Glennon 0-1, Fintan Burke 0-1, Eanna Murphy 0-1 (0-1f), Jason Flynn 0-1	Attendance: 30,802

28 May 2023 Round 5	Wexford	4-23 - 5-18	Kilkenny	Chadwicks Wexford Park
	Lee Chin 1-10 (0-6 frees, 0-1 ‘65), Liam Óg McGovern 2-1, Kevin Foley 1-1, Rory O’Connor 0-4, Oisín Foley, Cathal Dunbar (one line-ball) 0-2 each, Conor McDonald, Diarmuid O’Keeffe, Liam Ryan 0-1 each	Report	Eoin Cody 3-1, Tom Phelan 1-4, TJ Reid 0-7 (4 frees, 1 ‘65), Martin Keoghan 1-0, Adrian Mullen, Walter Walsh, Billy Ryan, Pádraig Walsh, Alan Murphy, Conor Delaney 0-1 each	Attendance: 9,725

== Leinster Final ==
11 June 2023
Leinster Final

Kilkenny	4-21 – 2-26	Galway
	Report

Croke Park
Attendance: 24,483
Referee: Seán Stack (Dublin)
Man of the match: Conor Whelan (Galway)

== Stadia and locations ==
Locations of the 2023 Leinster SHC teams.

County	Location	Province	Stadium	Capacity
Neutral venue	Dublin	Leinster	Croke Park	82,300
Antrim	Belfast	Ulster	Corrigan Park	3,700
Dublin	Donnycarney	Leinster	Parnell Park	7,300
Galway	Galway	Connacht	Pearse Stadium	26,197
Kilkenny	Kilkenny	Leinster	Nowlan Park	27,000
Westmeath	Mullingar	Leinster	Cusack Park	11,500
Wexford	Wexford	Leinster	Chadwicks Wexford Park	18,000

== Championship statistics ==
=== Scoring events ===
- Widest winning margin: 34 points
  - Galway 6-33 - 0-17 Westmeath (Round 3)
- Most goals in a match: 9
  - Wexford 4-23 - 5-18 Kilkenny (Round 5)
- Most points in a match: 56
  - Wexford 1-30 - 1-26 Antrim (Round 2)
- Most goals by one team in a match: 6
  - Galway 6-33 - 0-17 Westmeath (Round 3)
- Most points by one team in a match: 33
  - Galway 6-33 - 0-17 Westmeath (Round 3)
- Highest aggregate score: 75 points
  - Antrim 3-20 - 5-31 Kilkenny (Round 3)
- Lowest aggregate score: 36 points
  - Kilkenny 0-29 - 0-07 Westmeath (Round 1)

== Miscellaneous ==
- Kilkenny won the championship for a fourth year in a row
- Westmeath defeated Wexford in the championship for the first time since 1940.

== See also ==
- 2023 All-Ireland Senior Hurling Championship
- 2023 Munster Senior Hurling Championship
- 2023 Joe McDonagh Cup (Tier 2)
- 2023 Christy Ring Cup (Tier 3)
- 2023 Nicky Rackard Cup (Tier 4)
- 2023 Lory Meagher Cup (Tier 5)
