= 2023 Lory Meagher Cup =

Gaelic sport (hurling) competition

- Dates: 15 April – 3 June 2023
- Teams: 6
- Champions: Monaghan (1st title)
- Runners-up: Lancashire

Tournament statistics
- Matches played: 16

The 2023 Lory Meagher Cup is the fifteenth edition of the Lory Meagher Cup since its establishment by the Gaelic Athletic Association in 2009 and is the fifth-tier of Hurling for senior county teams (the All-Ireland Senior Hurling Championship is the first-tier trophy). It is contested by six GAA county teams ranked 30–35 in the 2023 All-Ireland Senior Hurling Championship. The cup fixtures were made in 2022.

Monaghan were the winners, defeating Lancashire in the final.

== Team changes ==
=== To Championship ===
Relegated from the Nicky Rackard Cup

- Warwickshire

=== From Championship ===
Promoted to the Nicky Rackard Cup

- Louth

== Teams ==
=== General Information ===
County	Last Cup Title	Last Provincial Title	Last All-Ireland Title	Position in 2022 Championship	Appearance
Cavan	—	—	—	6th	9th
Lancashire	—	—	—	5th	7th
Leitrim	2019	—	—	3rd	12th
Longford	2014	—	—	Runners-up	9th
Monaghan	—	1915	—	4th	3rd
Warwickshire	2017	—	—	6th (Nicky Rackard Cup)	10th

=== Personnel and kits ===
County	Manager	Captain(s)	Sponsor
Cavan			
Lancashire			
Leitrim			
Longford			
Monaghan			
Warwickshire			

== Format ==
=== Cup format ===
The 6 teams will play each other once in the Group Stage. The top 2 teams in the group will advance to the final.

==== Promotion ====
The winner of the final will be promoted to the Nicky Rackard Cup.

=== Teams by province ===
The participating teams, listed by province, with numbers in parentheses indicating final positions in the 2023 National Hurling League before the championship were:

Britain (2)

- Lancashire (34)
- Warwickshire (35)

Connacht (1)

- Leitrim (32)

Leinster (1)

- Longford (33)

Munster (0)

- None participated

Ulster (2)

- Cavan (30)
- Monaghan (27)

== Group Stage ==
=== Table ===
Pos	Team	Pld	W	D	L	SF	SA	Diff	Pts	Qualification
1	Monaghan	5	3	1	1	10-98	9-67	+34	7	Advance to Knockout Stage
2	Lancashire	5	3	0	2	20-76	14-97	-3	6	Advance to Knockout Stage
3	Cavan	5	2	1	2	7-106	12-77	+14	5	
4	Longford	5	2	1	2	6-84	6-75	+9	5	
5	Leitrim	5	2	1	2	8-73	9-78	-10	5	
6	Warwickshire	5	1	0	4	10-60	11-101	-44	2	

=== Round 1 ===
15 April 2023 Round 1	Lancashire	3-21 – 2-17	Longford	Birmingham
		(HT: 2-10 - 0-09)		Venue: Páirc na hÉireann
	Gls: D Carroll 2, R McCormack 1. Pts: R Spencer 4, E Clifford 4, S Madden 3, D Carroll 3, F Henry 2, S Nugent 1, E Kearns 1, C Madden 1, E Kelly 1, C Kenny 1.		Gls: D Crossan 1, R Murray 1. Pts: C Mullane 9, L Browne 3, P Lynam 3, D Buckley 2.	Referee: K Brady (Louth)

16 April 2023 Round 1	Warwickshire	3-15 – 0-22	Cavan	Birmingham
				Venue: Páirc na hÉireann
	Gls: J Grealish 2, L Hands 1. Pts: J Grealish 7, L Hands 5, K Murphy 2, N Eames 1.		Pts: C Maher 12, T Leonard 4, S Keating 2, M Moffett 1, C Sheanon 1, D Mulligan 1, D Carney 1.	Referee: C Daly

16 April 2023 Round 1	Monaghan	1-18 – 3-12	Leitrim	Clontibret
				Venue: Páirc Uí Néill
	Gls: C Merrick 1. Pts: N Arthur 8, T Hughes 3, N Garland 2, D Hughes 2, F Rafter 2, S Lambe 1.		Gls: C Beirne 2, M Feeney 1. Pts: G O'Hagan 5, M Feeney 3, T Brannigan 1, S Goldrick 1, D McGovern 1, C Beirne 1.	Referee: T Conway

=== Round 2 ===
22 April 2023 Round 2	Leitrim	1-15 – 4-15	Lancashire	Drumshanbo
				Venue: Shane McGettigan Memorial Park
	Gls: J Murray 1. Pts: J Murray 4, J McNabola 4, M Feeney 3, C Beirne 2, E Moreton 1, S Keane 1.		Gls: R McCormack 2, E Kelly 1, C Kennedy 1 Pts: R Spencer 10, S Madden 2, C Madden 2, D Burke 1.

22 April 2023 Round 2	Cavan	2-16 – 0-19	Monaghan	Cavan
				Venue: Kingspan Breffni Park
	Gls: D Carney 1, S Keating 1. Pts: C Maher 5, C Sheanon 4, M Moffett 3, S Keating 2, E Shalvey 1, D Mulligan 1.		Pts: N Arthur 13, T Hughes 2, K Cawley 1, D Hughes 1, N Garland 1, C McHugh 1.

23 April 2023 Round 2	Longford	2-23 – 1-09	Warwickshire	Longford
				Venue: Pearse Park
	Gls: P Lynam 1, R Murray 1. Pts: R Murray 5, C Mullane 5, D Buckley 4, E Tully 3, P Lynam 2, R Sheehan 1, K Murray 1, A Quinn 1, C Flynn 1.		Gls: N Eames 1. Pts: L Hands 2, J Grealish 2, N Eames 1, B O'Sullivan 1, O Coffey 1, A Hanley 1, A Hands 1.

=== Round 3 ===
29 April 2023 Round 3	Cavan	3-29 – 5-09	Lancashire	Kingspan Breffni Park
14:00				Venue: Cavan
	Gls: N Kenny 1, M Moffett 1, S Keating 1. Pts: C Maher 11, N Kenny 9, M Moffett 4, T Leonard 2, S Keating 1, R Delaney 1, D Mulligan 1.		Gls: C Kennedy 2, C Madden 1, R McCormack 1, D Carroll 1. Pts: C Madden 4, S Madden 2, C Kennedy 1, C O'Shea 1, R Spencer 1.

30 April 2023 Round 3	Monaghan	2-26 – 1-04	Warwickshire	Cloghan
				Venue: Cloghan COE
	Gls: E Flynn 1, T Hughes 1. Pts: N Arthur 11, E Flynn 5, T Hughes 4, N Garland 3, S Lambe 2, D Hughes 1.		Gls: R Murray 1. Pts: N Eames 2, J Grealish 1, L Hand 1.

30 April 2023 Round 3	Leitrim	0-08 – 0-12	Longford	Drumshambo
14:00				Venue: Shane McGeittigan Memorial Park
	Pts: J Murray 6, S Markham 1, G O'Hagan 1.		Pts: C Mullane 5, D Buckley 3, P Lynam 3, R Murray 1.

=== Round 4 ===
13 May 2023 Round 4	Longford	2-15 – 0-21	Cavan	Longford
				Venue: Pearse Park
	Gls: D Buckley 1, J Mulhern 1. Pts: C Mullane 9, P Lynam 4, D Buckley 1, R Murray 1.	Report	Pts: C Maher 12, N Kenny 5, S Keating 1, T Leonard 1, M Moffett 1, D Carney 1.

14 May 2023 Round 4	Warwickshire	2-15 – 2-17	Leitrim	Birmingham
12:00				Venue: Páirc na hÉireann
	Gls: J Collins 1, O Coffey 1. Pts: L Hands 3; P Crehan 3; E McWilliams 2; J Collins 2; O Coffey 1; K Murphy 1, N Eames 1, D King 1, A Hands 1.	Report	Gls: J Murray 1, B Delaney 1. Pts: J Murray 13, G O’Hagan 2; P Poniard 1, S Markham 1.

14 May 2023 Round 4	Lancashire	3-18 – 5-19	Monaghan	Birmingham
14:00				Venue: Páirc na hÉireann
	Gls: R Spencer 2, R McCormack 1. Pts: R Spencer 6; R McCormack 6; C Kennedy 2, C Madden 2; E Clifford 1, D Carroll 1.	Report	Gls: T Hughes 2, F Rafter 2, N Arthur 1, Pts: N Arthur 8; T Hughes 3, C Gernon 3, E Flynn 3; N Garland 1, C Merrick 1.

=== Round 5 ===
20 May 2023 Round 5	Cavan	2-18 – 2-19	Leitrim

20 May 2023 Round 5	Monaghan	2-16 – 0-17	Longford

20 May 2023 Round 5	Warwickshire	3-17 – 5-13	Lancashire

== Knockout stage ==
=== Final ===
3 June 2023 Final	Monaghan	3-22 - 3-20	Lancashire	Dublin
	Niall Arthur 0-10 (0-6f), Niall Garland 2-3, Thomas Hughes 1-2, Ethan Flynn, Stephen Lambe and Conor Gernon 0-2 each, Declan Hughes 0-1.	Report	Robin Spencer 1-6 (0-5f), Conor Madden 0-7 (0-3f, 0-2 65s, 0-1 s/l), Simon Holland 1-1, Darragh Carroll 1-0, Shane Madden 0-2, Eoghan Clifford, Conor Kennedy, Phil Shine and Cormac Kenny 0-1 each.	Stadium: Croke Park; Referee: Tarlach Conway (Derry)

- Monaghan are promoted to the 2024 Nicky Rackard Cup.

== Stadia and locations ==
County	Location	Province	Stadium	Capacity
Cavan	Cavan	Ulster	Breffni Park	32,000
Lancashire	East Didsbury	Britain	Old Bedians	
Leitrim	Carrick-on-Shannon	Connacht	Páirc Seán Mac Diarmada	9,331
Longford	Longford	Leinster	Pearse Park	6,000
Monaghan	Clones	Ulster	St Tiernach's Park	36,000
Warwickshire	Solihull	Britain	Páirc na hÉireann	4,500

== Statistics ==
=== Top scorers ===
==== Overall ====
Rank	Player	Team	Tally	Total	Matches	Average
1	Niall Arthur	Monaghan	1-40	43	4	10.75
2	Canice Maher	Cavan	0-40	40	4	10.00

==== In a single game ====
Rank	Player	Team	Tally	Total	Opposition
1	Joe Murray	Leitrim	1-13	16	Warwickshire
2	Jack Grealish	Warwickshire	2-07	13	Cavan
2	Niall Arthur	Monaghan	0-13	13	Cavan

=== Scoring events ===
- Widest winning margin: 25 points
  - Monaghan 2-26 - 1-04 Warwickshire (Round 3)
- Most goals in a match: 8
  - Cavan 3-29 - 5-09 Lancashire (Round 3)
  - Lancashire 3-18 - 5-19 Monaghan (Round 4)
  - Warwickshire 3-17 - 5-13 Lancashire (Round 5)
- Most points in a match: 42
  - Monaghan 3-22 - 3-20 Lancashire (Final)
- Most goals by one team in a match: 5
  - Cavan 3-29 - 5-09 Lancashire (Round 3)
  - Lancashire 3-18 - 5-19 Monaghan (Round 4)
  - Warwickshire 3-17 - 5-13 Lancashire (Round 5)
- Most points by one team in a match: 29
  - Cavan 3-29 - 5-09 Lancashire (Round 3)
- Highest aggregate score: 62 points
  - Cavan 3-29 - 5-09 Lancashire (Round 3)
- Lowest aggregate score: 20 points
  - Leitrim 0-08 - 0-12 Longford (Round 3)

== Miscellaneous ==
- Monaghan won their 1st championship in 25 years, last winning the 1998 Ulster Junior Hurling Championship.
- It was also Monaghans first ever national championship victory and the first time the senior team ever played in Croke Park.

== See also ==
- 2023 All-Ireland Senior Hurling Championship
- 2023 Leinster Senior Hurling Championship
- 2023 Munster Senior Hurling Championship
- 2023 Joe McDonagh Cup (Tier 2)
- 2023 Christy Ring Cup (Tier 3)
- 2023 Nicky Rackard Cup (Tier 4)
