= 2023 Christy Ring Cup =

Hurling competition

- Dates: April 16, 2023 – June 4, 2023
- Teams: 6
- Champions: Meath (3rd title)
- Runners-up: Derry
- Relegated: Mayo

Tournament statistics
- Matches played: 12
- Goals scored: 36 (3 per match)
- Points scored: 509 (42.42 per match)

The 2023 Christy Ring Cup was the 19th staging of the Christy Ring Cup since its establishment by the Gaelic Athletic Association in 2005. The competition began on 16 April 2023 and ended in June 2023.

The 2023 Christy Ring Cup was played on a round-robin basis with the top two counties qualifying for the final and the final winner being promoted to the 2nd tier 2024 Joe McDonagh Cup. This was Meath, resulting in an immediate return to the 2nd tier for them following their relegation from the Joe McDonagh in 2022.

The bottom placed team, Mayo, was relegated to the 2024 Nicky Rackard Cup.

Tyrone made their debut in this year's Christy Ring Cup. following their promotion from the Nicky Rackard Cup in 2022.

== Team changes ==
=== To Championship ===
Relegated from the Joe McDonagh Cup

- Meath

Promoted from the Nicky Rackard Cup

- Tyrone

=== From Championship ===
Promoted to the Joe McDonagh Cup

- Kildare

Relegated to the Nicky Rackard Cup

- Wicklow

== Format ==
=== Format ===
The 2023 Christy Ring Cup employs a round-robin system, contested within a single group of 6 county teams. At the completion of the round-robin, the top two teams proceed to contest the Christy Ring Cup final.

Aside from the trophy itself, the reward for victory in the cup is promotion to the 2024 Joe McDonagh Cup, with their place in the 2024 Christy Ring Cup taken by the bottom-placed team in that year's Joe McDonagh Cup.

There is no direct entry route to the 2023 All-Ireland Senior Hurling Championship for 2023 Christy Ring Cup teams.

The bottom team in the group stage are relegated to the 2024 Nicky Rackard Cup, being replaced by the champions of the 2023 Nicky Rackard Cup.

=== Teams by province ===
The participating teams, listed by province, with numbers in parentheses indicating final positions in the 2023 National Hurling League before the championship were:

Britain (1)

- London (23)

Connacht (2)

- Mayo (28)
- Sligo (25)

Leinster (1)

- Meath (18)

Munster (0)

- None participated

Ulster (2)

- Derry (19)
- Tyrone (22) (debut)

== Teams ==
=== General Information ===
County	Last Cup Title	Last Provincial title	Last All-Ireland title	Position in 2022 Championship	Appearance
Derry	—	2001	—	3rd	17th
Mayo	—	1909	—	Runners-up	15th
Meath	2019	—	—	6th (Joe McDonagh Cup)	13th
London	2012	—	1901	4th	11th
Sligo	—	—	—	5th	4th
Tyrone	—	—	—	Champions (Nicky Rackard Cup)	1st

=== Personnel and kits ===
County	Manager	Captain(s)	Sponsor
Derry	Johnny McGarvey	Cormac O'Doherty	Errigal Group
London	Kevin McMullan	Jack Goulding	Clayton Hotels
Mayo	Dave McConn/Tom Phillips	David Kenny	Intersport Elverys
Meath	Seoirse Bulfin	Charlie Ennis/Jack Regan	Glenveagh
Sligo	Padraig Mannion	Kevin O'Kennedy	Clayton Hotels
Tyrone	Michael McShane	Lorcan Devlin	McAleer & Rushe

== Group stage ==
=== Table ===
Pos	Team	Pld	W	D	L	SF	SA	Diff	Pts	Qualification
1	Meath	5	4	0	1	4-117	5-98	+16	8	Advance to Knockout Stage
2	Derry	5	3	1	1	8-126	10-84	+36	7	Advance to Knockout Stage
3	Sligo	5	3	0	2	6-97	7-110	-16	6	
4	London	5	3	0	2	13-106	8-112	+9	6	
5	Tyrone	5	1	1	3	9-95	5-113	-6	3	
6	Mayo	5	0	0	5	3-99	8-120	-39	0	Relegated to Nicky Rackard Cup

=== Round 1 ===
16 April 2023 Round 1	Sligo	2-20 - 1-20	London	Markievicz Park
	A Kilcullen 0-14 (12f); D Hanniffy 1-2; J McHugh 1-0; C Hanniffy 0-3; E O’Donoghue 0-1.	Report	R Crowley 0-10 (9f); D Barron 1-0; D Dawson, F O’Keeffe, J Goulding 0-2 each; C McCormack, N Broderick, C O’Carroll, A Cunney 0-1 each.	Referee: J Connors (Donegal)

16 April 2023 Round 1	Tyrone	2-20 - 2-20	Derry	O'Neill's Healy Park
	L Devlin, S Óg Grogan 1-2 each; D Begley 0-7 (6f); S Duffin 0-4 (2f); A Kelly 0-2; C Grogan, F Devlin, R Slane 0-1 each.	Report	J Mullan 1-8; C O’Doherty 1-3 (1-0 pen, 0-2f); D McGilligan, R Mullan 0-2 each; J Friel, P Kelly, E Conway, M Craig, P Neilis 0-1 each.	Referee: J Clarke (Cavan)

16 April 2023 Round 1	Meath	2-20 - 0-24	Mayo	Páirc Tailteann
	J Regan 1-11 (6f, 1’65); E O Donnchadha 1-2; P O’Hanrahan, J Kelly 0-2 each; M Cole, S Geraghty, S Ennis 0-1 each.	Report	C Phillips 0-13 (11f); J McManus 0-3; E Delaney, M Farrell, F Boland 0-2 each; A Phillips, J Coyne 0-1 each.	Referee: C Flynn (Westmeath)

=== Round 2 ===
22 April 2023 Round 2	Mayo	1-17 - 2-22	Tyrone	Hastings Insurance MacHale Park
	C Phillips (0-6, 5f), E Delaney (0-4); J McManus (1-0), J Mooney (0-3), J Coyne (0-2), F Boland (0-1), M Farrell (0-1).	Report	D Begley (0-7, 6f), S Duffin (1-3, 2f), L Devlin (1-2), C Grogan (0-4), A Kelly (0-3); R Slane (0-1); S Grogan (0-1), R Weir (0-1).	Referee: B Keon (Galway)

23 April 2023 Round 2	London	4-17 - 1-24	Meath	McGovern Park
	R Crowley 0-12 seven frees; D Dawson 1-1; N Broderick 1-0; C O'Carroll 1-0; F O'Keeffe 1-0; J Goulding 0-3 one sideline; S Glynn 0-1.	Report	J Regan 0-9 two frees; J Kelly 1-3; E O Donnchadha 0-3; N Potterton 0-3; D Healy 0-2; J Toher 0-1; M Healy 0-1; P O'Hanrahan 0-1; M Cole 0-1;	Referee: T Conway (Derry)

23 April 2023 Round 2	Derry	4-27 - 2-13	Sligo	Owenbeg COE
	C O'Doherty (1-12, 11f), J Mullan (1-5), J Friel (1-1), R Mac Somhaile (1-0), D McGilligan (0-4), E Conway (0-2), P Cleary (0-1), S Melaugh (0-1), R Mullan (0-1).	Report	E O'Donaghue (2-0), A Kilcullen (0-10, 7f), R McHugh (0-1), T Cawley (0-1), J McHugh (0-1).	Referee: C McDonald (Antrim)

=== Round 3 ===
29 April 2023 Round 3	Derry	1-19 - 1-21	Meath	Owenbeg COE

30 April 2023 Round 3	Mayo	0-21 - 2-22	London	Hastings Insurance MacHale Park

30 April 2023 Round 3	Tyrone	1-16 - 0-20	Sligo	Páirc Colmcille

=== Round 4 ===
13 May 2023 Round 4	Sligo	2-26 - 1-23	Mayo	Markievicz Park

13 May 2023 Round 4	Meath	0-28 - 0-20	Tyrone	Páirc Tailteann

14 May 2023 Round 4	London	4-19 - 1-30	Derry	Ruislip

=== Round 5 ===
20 May 2023 Round 5	Tyrone	4-17 - 2-28	London	Páirc Colmcille, Carrickmore

20 May 2023 Round 5	Derry	0-30 - 1-11	Mayo	Owenbeg

20 May 2023 Round 5	Sligo	0-18 - 0-24	Meath	Markievicz Park

== Knockout stage ==
=== Final ===
3 June 2023 Final	Meath	1-23 - 1-21	Derry	Dublin
	James Regan 0-14 (0-11f), Nicky Potterton 1-1, Éamon Ó Donnchadha 0-3, Martin Healy 0-1, Pa Ryan 0-1, Simon Ennis 0-1, James Kelly 0-1, Seanie Geraghty 0-1.	Report	Cormac O’Doherty 1-14 (1-14f), John Mullan 0-2, Corey O’Reilly 0-2, Seán Kelly 0-1, Pádhraig Nelis 0-1, Ségdae Melaugh 0-1.	Stadium: Croke Park, Dublin; Referee: Kevin Jordan (Tipperary)

Meath are promoted to the 2024 Joe McDonagh Cup.

== Stadia and locations ==
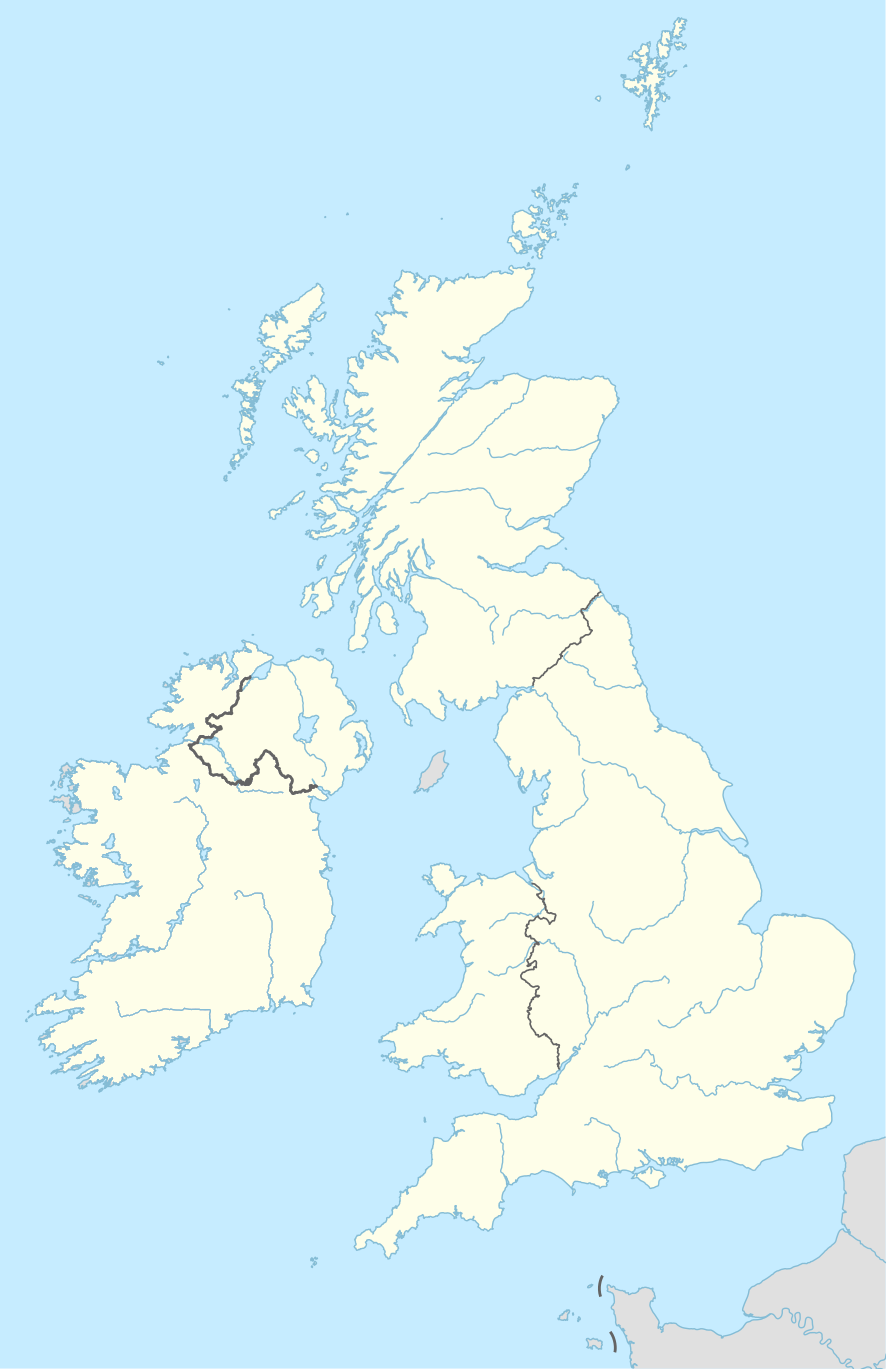
Locations of the 2023 Christy Ring Cup counties.

County	Location	Province	Stadium	Capacity
Derry	Derry	Ulster	Celtic Park	22,000
London	South Ruislip	Britain	McGovern Park	3,000
Mayo	Castlebar	Connacht	MacHale Park	25,369
Meath	Navan	Leinster	Páirc Tailteann	11,000
Sligo	Sligo	Connacht	Markievicz Park	18,558
Tyrone	Omagh	Ulster	Healy Park	17,636

== Statistics ==
=== Top scorers ===
==== Overall ====
Rank	Player	Club	Tally	Total	Matches	Average
1	Ronan Crowley	London	2-45	51	4	12.75
2	Andrew Kilcullen	Sligo	2-40	46	4	11.50
3	Cormac O'Doherty	Derry	3-32	41	4	10.25
4	Jack Regan	Meath	1-36	39	4	9.75
5	Cormac Philips	Mayo	0-28	28	4	7.00
6	Sean Duffin	Tyrone	1-23	26	4	6.50
7	John Mullan	Derry	2-14	22	4	5.50

=== Scoring events ===
- Widest winning margin: 20 points
  - Derry 4-27 - 2-13 Sligo (Round 2)
- Most goals in a match: 6
  - Derry 4-27 - 2-13 Sligo (Round 2)
  - Tyrone 4-17 - 2-28 London (Round 5)
- Most points in a match: 49
  - Sligo 2-26 - 1-23 Mayo (Round 4)
  - London 4-19 - 1-30 Derry (Round 4)
- Most goals by one team in a match: 4
  - London 4-17 - 1-24 Meath (Round 2)
  - Derry 4-27 - 2-13 Sligo (Round 2)
  - London 4-19 - 1-30 Derry (Round 4)
  - Tyrone 4-17 - 2-28 London (Round 5)
- Most points by one team in a match: 30
  - London 4-19 - 1-30 Derry (Round 4)
  - Derry 0-30 - 1-11 Mayo (Round 5)
- Highest aggregate score: 64 points
  - London 4-19 - 1-30 Derry (Round 4)
- Lowest aggregate score: 39 points
  - Tyrone 1-16 - 0-20 Sligo (Round 3)

== Miscellaneous ==
- Meath won their 1st championship in 4 years, last winning the 2019 Christy Ring Cup.
- Tyrone made their debut in the Christy Ring Cup.
- First-time Christy Ring Cup meetings:
  - Tyrone v Derry (Round 1)
  - Mayo v Tyrone (Round 2)
  - Tyrone v Sligo (Round 3)
  - Meath v Tyrone (Round 4)
  - Tyrone v London (Round 5)
  - Sligo v Meath (Round 5)

== See also ==
- 2023 All-Ireland Senior Hurling Championship
- 2023 Leinster Senior Hurling Championship
- 2023 Munster Senior Hurling Championship
- 2023 Joe McDonagh Cup (Tier 2)
- 2023 Nicky Rackard Cup (Tier 4)
- 2023 Lory Meagher Cup (Tier 5)
