= Cian O'Callaghan (hurler) =

Irish hurler

Personal information
- Native name: Cian Ó Ceallacháin (Irish)
- Born: 1994 (age 31–32) Dalkey, County Dublin, Ireland
- Occupation: Analyst

Sport
- Sport: Hurling
- Position: Left corner back
Club
- Years: Club
- Cuala
Club titles
- Dublin titles: 5
- Leinster titles: 2
- All-Ireland Titles: 2
College
- Years: College
- University College Dublin
College titles
- Fitzgibbon titles: 0
Inter-county
- Years: County
- 2015–2022: Dublin

Cian O'Callaghan (born 1994) is an Irish hurler who plays for Dublin Senior Championship club Cuala and formerly at inter-county level with the Dublin senior hurling team. He currently lines out as a left corner-back.

== Honours ==
Cuala

- All-Ireland Senior Club Hurling Championship: 2017, 2018
- Leinster Senior Club Hurling Championship: 2016, 2017
- Dublin Senior Hurling Championship: 2015, 2016, 2017, 2019, 2020

Dublin

- Leinster Minor Hurling Championship: 2011, 2012
