= 2023 Munster Senior Hurling Championship final =

- Event: 2023 Munster Senior Hurling Championship
Clare	Limerick
1–22	1–23
- Date: 11 June 2023
- Venue: Gaelic Grounds, Limerick
- Man of the Match: Aaron Gillane (Limerick)
- Referee: Liam Gordon (Galway)
- Attendance: 43,756
- Weather: Sunny

The 2023 Munster Senior Hurling Championship final was a hurling match that was played on 11 June at the Gaelic Grounds in Limerick. It was contested by defending champions Limerick and Clare.

The game was televised live on RTÉ 2 as part of The Sunday Game, presented by Joanne Cantwell, with analysis from Anthony Daly, Joe Canning and Shane Dowling. Commentary on the game was provided by Marty Morrissey alongside Brendan Cummins.

== Overview ==
The two teams were meeting in the Munster final for the second year in a row with Limerick winning the final in 2022 by 1–29 to 0-29 after extra-time. Limerick were bidding to win the Munster title for a fifth successive year and for the 24th time overall with Clare looking for a first Munster title since 1998 and seventh title. This was the 62nd championship game between the two counties, Limerick having 38 wins to Clare's 21 with two draws, from the previous 61.

General sale terrace tickets for the match went on sale on 1 June and sold out within 23 minutes. All other tickets were allocated to the county boards of the two counties for distribution to the clubs.

== Match ==
=== Details ===
RTÉ2

11 June 2023
13:45
Final

Report

Clare	1–22 – 1–23	Limerick

Gaelic Grounds, Limerick
Referee: Liam Gordon (Galway)
Man of the Match: Aaron Gillane (Limerick)
Attendance: 43,756
