= Diarmaid Byrnes =

Irish hurler

Personal information
- Native name: Diarmaid Ó Broin (Irish)
- Born: 24 February 1994 (age 32) Patrickswell, County Limerick, Ireland
- Occupation: DHL Global Forwarding Executive
- Height: 6 ft 4 in (193 cm)

Sport
- Sport: Hurling
- Position: Right wing-back
Club
- Years: Club
- Patrickswell
Club titles
- Limerick titles: 2
College
- Years: College
- Limerick Institute of Technology
Inter-county*
Years	County	Apps (scores)
2016-present	Limerick	58 (6-155)
Inter-county titles
- Munster titles: 7
- All-Irelands: 6
- NHL: 4
- All Stars: 5
- *Inter County team apps and scores correct as of 23:08, 30 October 2026.

Diarmaid Byrnes (born 24 February 1994) is an Irish hurler who plays as a right wing-back for club side Patrickswell and at inter-county level with the Limerick senior hurling team. Outside of hurling, he works at DHL.

== Playing career ==
=== School ===
Diarmuid Byrnes attended secondary school at Sexton Street CBS in Limerick city where he has subsequently returned to give motivational talks to students.

=== University ===
During his studies at Limerick Institute of Technology, Byrnes was selected for the college's senior hurling team for the Fitzgibbon Cup. Byrnes went on to study Supply Chain Management at the University of Limerick in 2022.

=== GAA ===
Byrnes joined Patrickswell GAA club at a young age and played in all grades at juvenile and underage levels.

On 23 October 2016, Byrnes won a Limerick Hurling Championship medal after scoring six points from centre-back in Patrickswell's 1–26 to 1–07 defeat of Ballybrown in the final.

Byrnes lined out in a second Limerick Championship final on 6 October 2019. Playing at centre-back, he scored two points, including a long-range free, and collected a second winners' medal following the 1–17 to 0–15 defeat of Na Piarsaigh.

=== Inter-county ===
==== Minor and under-21 ====
Byrnes first played for Limerick at minor level in 2012, in a season which ended with a defeat by Clare in the Munster Championship semi-final.

Byrnes subsequently joined the Limerick under-21 hurling team. He made his first appearance on 4 June 2014, however, he was sent off after receiving two yellow cards in a 2–20 to 1–14 defeat by Clare.

In his second season with the team Byrnes won a Munster Championship medal after a 0–22 to 0–19 win over Clare in the final. On 12 September 2015, Byrnes was at right wing-back when Limerick defeated Wexford by0-26 to 1–07 in the All-Ireland final. He ended the season by being named on the Bord Gáis Energy Team of the Year.

==== Senior ====
Byrnes made his first appearance for the Limerick senior hurling team on 13 February 2016 in a 2–23 to 0–15 defeat of Wexford in the National Hurling League. Later that season he made his first championship appearance in a 3–12 to 1–16 defeat by Tipperary in the Munster Championship.

In April 2017, Byrnes sustained a knee injury which rules him out of the championship.

On 19 August 2018, Byrnes scored a point from right wing-back when Limerick won their first All-Ireland title in 45 years after a 3–16 to 2–18 defeat of Galway in the final. Later that day he was named on The Sunday Game Team of the Year. Byrnes ended the season by being nominated for an All-Star Award.

On 31 March 2019, Byrnes was selected at left wing-back for Limerick's National League final meeting with Waterford at Croke Park. He collected a winners' medal following the 1–24 to 0–19 victory. On 30 June 2019, Byrnes won a Munster Championship medal after scoring three long-range frees from right wing-back in Limerick's 2–26 to 2–14 defeat of Tipperary in the final.

== Career statistics ==
As of match played 19 July 2026.

Team	Year	National League			Munster		All-Ireland		Total	
Team	Year	Division	Apps	Score	Apps	Score	Apps	Score	Apps	Score
Limerick	2016	Division 1B	7	0-16	1	0-00	2	0-03	10	0-19
Limerick	2017	Division 1B	6	0-03	0	0-00	0	0-00	6	0-03
Limerick	2018	Division 1B	7	1-13	4	0-06	4	1-04	15	2-23
Limerick	2019	Division 1A	8	0-20	4	0-09	1	0-02	13	0-31
Limerick	2020	Division 1A	5	0-06	3	0-08	2	0-04	10	0-18
Limerick	2021	Division 1A	3	0-05	2	0-07	2	0-07	7	0-19
	2022	Division 1A	5	0-15	5	0-25	2	0-11	12	0-51
	2023		4	0-17	5	1-16	2	0-11	11	1-45
	2024		6	0-11	5	1-11	1	0-03	12	1-25
	2025		4	0-13	5	0-10	1	0-00	9	0-23
	2026		7	0-11	5	3-11	2	0-07	14	3-29
Career total			62	1-130	39	5-103	19	1-52	120	7-287

== Honours ==
Patrickswell

- Limerick Senior Hurling Championship: 2016, 2019

Limerick

- All-Ireland Senior Hurling Championship: 2018, 2020, 2021, 2022, 2023, 2026
- Munster Senior Hurling Championship: 2019, 2020, 2021, 2022, 2023, 2024, 2026
- National Hurling League: 2019, 2020, 2023
- All-Ireland Under-21 Hurling Championship: 2015 (c)
- Munster Under-21 Hurling Championship: 2015 (c)

Awards

- The Sunday Game Team of the Year (5): 2018, 2020, 2021, 2022, 2023
- The Sunday Game Hurler of the Year: 2022
- All-Star Award (5): 2020, 2021, 2022, 2023, 2026
- GAA-GPA All-Star Hurler of the Year (1): 2022

Achievements
Preceded by Tony Kelly	All-Ireland Under-21 Hurling Final winning captain 2015	Succeeded by Patrick Curran
