= Derek Lyng =

Kilkenny hurler, manager, selector (born 1978)

Personal information
- Native name: Deiric Ó Loinn (Irish)
- Born: 4 July 1978 (age 48) Urlingford, County Kilkenny, Ireland
- Occupation: Account lead
- Height: 6 ft 0 in (183 cm)

Sport
- Sport: Hurling
- Position: Midfield
Club
- Years: Club
- 1995–2014: Emeralds
Club titles
- Kilkenny titles: 1 (Junior)
College
- Years: College
- Waterford Institute of Technology
College titles
- Fitzgibbon titles: 1
Inter-county*
Years	County	Apps (scores)
2001–2010	Kilkenny	39 (0–36)
Inter-county titles
- Leinster titles: 9
- All-Irelands: 6
- NHL: 5
- All Stars: 2
- *Inter County team apps and scores correct as of 17:56, 15 January 2015.

Derek Thomas Lyng (born 4 July 1978) is an Irish hurling manager and former player. He was also the manager of the Kilkenny senior hurling team from 2022 until 2026.

== Playing career ==
=== Waterford Institute of Technology ===
As a student at the Waterford Institute of Technology, Lyng joined the senior hurling team during his second year but found it difficult to break onto the starting fifteen. On 28 February 1999, he won a Fitzgibbon Cup medal after coming on as a substitute in the 4–15 to 3–12 defeat of University College Cork in the final.

=== Emeralds ===
Lyng joined the Emeralds club in Urlingford at a young age and played in all grades at juvenile and underage levels. He enjoyed championship success in the minor grade before eventually joining the club's top adult team in the Kilkenny Junior Championship.

On 31 October 1999, Lyng was selected at right wing-back when Emeralds qualified to play Carrickshock in the Kilkenny Junior Championship final. He ended the game on the losing side after a 1–06 to 0–08 defeat.

On 7 October 2001, Lyng lined out at midfield when Emeralds qualified for a second Kilkenny Junior Championship final in two seasons. He ended the game with a winner's medal following the 3–11 to 1–11 defeat of Windgap.

After more than a decade in the Kilkenny Intermediate Championship, Emeralds qualified for the final on 20 October 2013. Lyng was selected at right wing-forward and was held scoreless in the 2–12 to 2–11 defeat by Rower-Inistioge.

=== Kilkenny ===
==== Under-21 ====
Having never played at minor level, Lyng first lined out for Kilkenny as a member of the under-21 team during the 1999 Leinster Championship. On 17 July 1999, he was an unused substitute when Kilkenny defeated Offaly by 1–17 to 1–06 to win the Leinster Championship. On 19 September 1999, Lyng won an All-Ireland medal as an unused substitute following Kilkenny's 1–13 to 0–14 defeat of Galway in the final.

==== Intermediate ====
Lyng was drafted onto the Kilkenny intermediate team in advance of the 1999 Leinster Championship. On 17 July 1999, he won a Leinster Championship medal following Kilkenny's 2–15 to 0–09 defeat of Laois in the final. On 25 September 1999, Lyng lined out at right wing-back when Kilkenny faced Galway in the All-Ireland final. He ended the game on the losing side after a 3–13 to 2–10 defeat.

==== Senior ====
Lyng joined the Kilkenny senior team prior to the start of the 2001 National League. He made his first appearance for the team on 11 February 2001 when he came on as a substitute for Peter Barry at left wing-back in a 3–16 to 0–11 defeat of Laois. Lyng made his Leinster Championship debut on 10 June 2001 when he again came on as a substitute for Peter Barry in a 3–21 to 0–18 defeat of Offaly in the semi-final. On 8 July 2001, he won a Leinster Championship medal as an unused substitute in Kilkenny's 2–19 to 0–12 defeat of Wexford.

On 5 May 2002, Lyng lined out at midfield when Kilkenny faced Cork in the National League final. He scored a point from play and collected a winners' medal following the 2–15 to 2–14 victory. Lyng was again at midfield when Kilkenny faced Wexford in the Leinster final on 7 July 2002. He scored two points from play and won a second successive Leinster Championship - his first on the field of play - after a 0–19 to 0–17 victory. On 8 September 2002, Lyng lined out at midfield when Kilkenny qualified to play Clare in the All-Ireland final. He ended the game with a first All-Ireland medal following the 2–20 to 0–19 victory. Lyng ended the season by winning a first All-Star award.

On 5 May 2003, Lyng won a second successive National League medal after lining out at midfield in Kilkenny's 5–14 to 5–13 defeat of Tipperary in the final. On 6 July 2003, he won his third consecutive Leinster Championship medal after scoring three points from play in the 2–23 to 2–12 defeat of Wexford in the final. On 7 September 2003, Lyng again lined out at midfield when Kilkenny faced Cork in the All-Ireland final. He scored a point from play and collected a second successive winners' medal following the 1–14 to 1–11 victory. Lyng ended the season by winning a second All-Star award.

On 12 September 2004, Lyng made his third successive All-Ireland final appearance when he lined out at midfield against Cork. He scored a point from play, however, Kilkenny suffered a 0–17 to 0–09 defeat.

On 2 May 2005, Lyng won a third National League medal after scoring a point from midfield in Kilkenny's 3–20 to 0–15 defeat of Clare in the final. On 7 July 2005, he won a fourth Leinster Championship medal following Kilkenny's 0–22 to 1–16 defeat of Wexford in the final.

On 30 April 2006, Lyng won his fourth National League medal after lining out at midfield in Kilkenny's 3–11 to 0–14 victory over Limerick. He won a fifth Leinster Championship medal on 2 July 2006 after scoring a point in a 1–23 to 1–12 defeat of Wexford in the final. On 3 September 2006, Lyng was again at midfield when Kilkenny qualified to play Cork in the All-Ireland final. He scored a point from play and claimed his third winners' medal after the 1–16 to 1–13 victory.

On 29 April 2007, lined out in his fifth National League final. He scored a point from midfield in the 0–20 to 0–18 defeat by Waterford. Lyng was sidelined due to a groin injury when Kilkenny faced Wexford in the Leinster final on 1 July 2007. In spite of this, he claimed a sixth winners' medal as a non-playing substitute following the 2–24 to 1–12 victory. On 2 September 2007, Lyng was back on the starting fifteen and lined out at midfield in the All-Ireland final against Limerick. He ended the game with a fourth All-Ireland medal following the 2–19 to 1–15 victory.

On 6 July 2008, Lyng won a seventh Leinster Championship medal after scoring a point from midfield in the 5–21 to 0–17 defeat of Wexford. On 8 September 2008, he was again at midfield when Kilkenny faced Waterford in a first All-Ireland final since 1963. Lyng scored three points from play and claimed a fifth All-Ireland medal following a 3–30 to 1–13 victory.

Lyng collected a fifth National League medal on 3 May 2009 when he lined out as a substitute in Kilkenny's 2–26 to 4-17 extra-time defeat of Tipperary in the final. On 5 July 2009, he was back on the starting fifteen in his usual position of midfield when Kilkenny faced Dublin in the Leinster final. Lyng ended the game with an eighth winners' medal following the 2–18 to 0–18 victory. He retained his position at midfield when Kilkenny faced Tipperary in the All-Ireland final on 6 September 2009. Lyng collected his sixth All-Ireland medal as Kilkenny became only the second team ever to win four All-Ireland titles in-a-row following the 2–22 to 0–23 victory.

Lyng failed to command a place on the starting fifteen during the 2010 Leinster Championship. In spite of this he won a ninth Leinster Championship medal as an unused substitute on 4 July 2010 following Kilkenny's 1–19 to 1–12 defeat of Galway. On 5 September 2010, he was selected on the substitutes' bench when Kilkenny faced Tipperary in the All-Ireland final. Lyng was introduced as a substitute for Cha Fitzpatrick at midfield and scored a point in the 4–17 to 1–18 defeat.

Lyng announced his retirement from inter-county hurling on 1 December 2010. In a statement he said: "There is never an ideal time to do something like this, but the time is right for me now. I had a great innings. I played with and against some of the greatest hurlers who ever lived and I picked up a few honours along the way."

=== Leinster ===
Lyng was first selected for the Leinster inter-provincial team during the 2002 Railway Cup. He made his first appearance for the team on 2 November 2002 when he scored a point from midfield in Leinster's 3–18 to 2–13 defeat of Connacht. On 3 November 2002, Lyng won a Railway Cup medal after scoring a point from midfield in the 4–15 to 3–17 defeat of Munster in the final.

After being selected for the team again in 2003, Lyng lined out in a second successive Railway Cup final on 8 November 2003. He scored a point from midfield and collected a second successive winners' medal following the 4–09 to 2–12 defeat of Connacht.

On 28 October 2006, Lyng was at midfield when he lined out in his third Railway Cup final. He was held scoreless throughout the game but collected a third winners' medal following the 1–23 to 0–17 defeat of Connacht.

=== Ireland ===
Lyng was selected for Ireland team for the Shinty–Hurling International Series in 2008. He made his only appearance for the team on 18 October 2008 when Ireland suffered a 1–10 to 1–09 defeat to Scotland.

== Coaching career ==
=== Leinster ===
Lyng joined Johnny Dooley's management team with Leinster in advance of the 2012 Railway Cup. On 4 March 2012, he was on the sideline when Leinster defeated Connacht by 2–19 to 1–15 to win the Railway Cup.

=== Kilkenny ===
==== Senior ====
On 9 December 2013, Lyng was appointed as a selector with the Kilkenny senior team under Brian Cody. He captured his first silverware as a selector on 4 May 2014 when Kilkenny defeated Tipperary by 2–25 to 1–27 to win the National League title. On 6 July 2014, Lyng was on the sideline when Kilkenny won the Leinster Championship following a 0–24 to 1–09 defeat of Dublin in the Leinster final. Following a 3–22 to 1–28 draw with Tipperary in the All-Ireland final on 7 September 2014, Lyng's side went on to win the title after a 2–17 to 2–14 victory in the replay on 27 September 2014.

Lyng won a second successive Leinster Championship as a selector on 5 July 2015 following Kilkenny's 1–25 to 2–15 defeat of Galway in the final. On 6 September 2015, he was again on the sideline for the All-Ireland final against Galway. Lyng ended the game with a second All-Ireland title as a selector following the 1–22 to 1–18 victory.

Lyng helped guide Kilkennny to a third successive Leinster Championship on 3 July 2016 following a 1–26 to 0–22 defeat of Galway in the final. On 4 September 2016, he saw his side suffer a 2–29 to 2–20 defeat by Tipperary in the All-Ireland final.

On 8 April 2018, Lyng secured his second National League title as a selector following Kilkenny's 2–23 to 2–17 defeat of Tipperary in the final. His side failed to retain the Leinster Championship for the fourth successive year following a 1–28 to 3–15 defeat by Galway in a final replay.

On 30 June 2019, Lyng was on the sideline when Kilkenny suffered a 1–23 to 0–23 defeat by Wexford in the Leinster final.

On 4 August 2022, Lyng was appointed manager of the Kilkenny senior hurling team.

David Herity endorsed Lyng's appointment as Brian Cody's successor, telling Off the Ball AM that Lyng would be a different type of manager: "Derek would be nothing like Brian... Derek was always seen as one of the lads in the dressing room Brian approached before a match and gave a dig to and said, 'right get these lads going'. He was that kind of lad, along with a Noel Hickey or Henry [Shefflin]. He would have ticked a few boxes in what Brian Cody would look for in a player and leader. When Derek came in [as a selector], he was slightly the yin to the yang. James McGarry and Brian Cody would be similar enough in personality, stand-offish. They wouldn't show a massive amount of emotion or talk to players in that sense. Derek Lyng would've been the more friendly type".

On 3 June 2026, Lyng stepped down as Kilkenny senior hurling manager after four years in charge.

==== Under-20 ====
After stepping down as a selector with the Kilkenny senior team, Lyng was ratified as D. J. Carey's successor as manager of the Kilkenny under-20 hurling team on 14 October 2019.

Lyng got his team off to a great start in 2022 winning the Leinster Under 20 Championship over Wexford by one point. Lyng, followed this with All Ireland success as Kilkenny won the Under 20 Championship with a win over Limerick for the first time since 2008.

=== Senior ===
On 4 August 2022, Lyng stepped down as under-20 manager as he returned to the Kilkenny senior team as manager.

== Career statistics ==
Team	Year	National League			Leinster		All-Ireland		Total	
Team	Year	Division	Apps	Score	Apps	Score	Apps	Score	Apps	Score
Kilkenny	2001	Division 1B	5	0-01	1	0-00	0	0-00	6	0-01
Kilkenny	2002	Division 1A	7	0-04	2	0-03	2	0-03	11	0-10
Kilkenny	2003	Division 1A	7	0-05	2	0-03	2	0-03	11	0-11
Kilkenny	2004	Division 1A	8	0-01	1	0-00	6	0-03	15	0-04
Kilkenny	2005	Division 1	5	0-08	2	0-02	2	0-01	9	0-11
Kilkenny	2006	Division 1	6	0-03	2	0-02	3	0-03	11	0-08
Kilkenny	2007	Division 1	8	1-10	1	0-01	3	0-02	12	1-13
Kilkenny	2008	Division 1	1	0-00	1	0-01	2	0-04	4	0-05
Kilkenny	2009	Division 1	0	0-00	2	0-03	2	0-01	4	0-04
Kilkenny	2010	Division 1	3	0-02	1	0-00	2	0-01	6	0-03
Career total			50	1-34	15	0-15	24	0-21	89	1-70

== Honours ==
=== As a player ===
Emeralds

- Kilkenny Junior Hurling Championship (1): 2001

Kilkenny

- All-Ireland Senior Hurling Championship (6): 2002, 2003, 2006, 2007, 2008, 2009
- Leinster Senior Hurling Championship (9): 2001, 2002, 2003, 2005, 2006, 2007, 2008, 2009, 2010
- National Hurling League (5): 2002, 2003, 2005, 2006, 2009
- All-Ireland Under-21 Hurling Championship (1): 1999
- Leinster Under-21 Hurling Championship (1): 1999
- Leinster Intermediate Hurling Championship (1): 1999

Leinster

- Railway Cup (3): 2002, 2003, 2006

Awards

- All-Stars (2): 2002, 2003

=== As a manager ===
Kilkenny

- Leinster Senior Hurling Championship (3): 2023, 2024, 2025

=== As a selector ===
Kilkenny

- All-Ireland Senior Hurling Championship (2): 2014, 2015
- Leinster Senior Hurling Championship (3): 2014, 2015, 2016
- National Hurling League (2): 2014, 2018

Leinster

- Railway Cup (1): 2012

Sporting positions
Preceded by D. J. Carey	Kilkenny Under-20 Hurling Manager; 2019–	Succeeded by Incumbent
